= Just for One Day (musical) =

2023 musical

- The Live Aid Musical
- West End production poster
- Music: Various
- Lyrics: Various
- Book: John O'Farrell
- Basis: Live Aid
- Premiere: 13 February 2024: The Old Vic, London
- Productions: 2024 London; 2025 Toronto

Just for One Day is a jukebox musical with a book by John O'Farrell. Told through a modern-day perspective, Just for One Day retells the events leading up to Live Aid, the 1985 benefit concert organized by Bob Geldof and Midge Ure to raise awareness and funds for the famine in Ethiopia. While the primary events leading to the concert are based on real events, the musical's narrative incorporates fictionalized sub-plots. The title of the musical is named after a line in "Heroes", a song by David Bowie that he performed at the event.

The musical premiered at The Old Vic in January 2024, and made its North American premiere at the Ed Mirvish Theatre in January 2025.

== Background ==
In 2021, Luke Sheppard and producer Jamie Wilson began creating the concept for a musical based around the real-life events leading up to Live Aid. In particular, they wanted to focus on the joy people experienced being at the event as well as the people who worked hard behind the scenes to put on the show. In addition, Sheppard and O'Farrell wanted to make sure the musical was not a tribute show of the musicians who performed at Live Aid; rather, they wanted the songs to be reinterpreted and capture the essence of the original performers.

Geldof was unimpressed with an early script of the musical, since he felt it focused too much on himself and not the underlying reasons for creating Live Aid. The script underwent multiple rewrites, which included adding a younger questioning perspective of what Live Aid was for. There was also a new focus on making the show about the ordinary people who helped put on Live Aid feel like heroes. After attending a workshop, Geldof said he was "blown away" and agreed to collaborate in the development of the musical. Pete Townshend attended a subsequent workshop, supported the musical, and gave clearance for his songs to be used. David Bowie's estate was the first to give clearance. Queen founding members Brian May and Roger Taylor initially declined permission, but quickly changed their mind after Geldof wrote them a letter and showed them footage of the actors performing the songs at a workshop.

== Synopsis ==
=== Act I ===
In the present-day, several people gather to reflect on their memories and experiences at Live Aid, including Suzanne, Marsha, Jim, and Amara, and how it made them feel like they could change the world ("Heroes"). Bob Geldof criticizes their idealized image of what Live Aid was, and says the event was a nightmare that he's had to live with. Jemma, a young student studying Live Aid in her history class, challenges Bob and argues her generation needs to know what happened so they can learn from it to actually make a change in the world. Bob reluctantly lets them continue. The group, led by John, performs Status Quo's opening number from Live Aid ("Rockin' All Over the World"). After, Jemma insists on learning the real story of how Live Aid happened.

In 1984, Suzanne and Tim in a record shop talking about famous musicians, while Suzanne is oblivious to Tim's flirting. Back in the present-day, Suzanne remembers the first record she ever bought was of The Boomtown Rats, where she goads Bob into mockingly performing their first hit ("Rat Trap"). As punk music's popularity declines, Bob enters a midlife crisis until he learns about the famine in Ethiopia ("Drive"). Bob and Jemma begin to bond over their anger at injustices in the world, with Bob sharing that he knew he needed to turn to music to create a response that people would listen to. In 1984, Bob approaches Midge Ure with the idea of creating a charity record to fundraise to raise money for the famine ("Dancing with Tears in My Eyes"). With the help of Marsha and Jim, they form Band Aid, a group of musicians who will record the charity record ("True / Every Breath You Take"). At the studio, Bob and Midge are initially forced to record the song themselves, however the other musicians eventually arrive ("Do They Know It's Christmas?"). Jemma questions some of the lyrics, but Bob insists he needed to write and record it as fast as possible. Bob's wife listens to the song, and encourages him to submit the song to the radio stations. BBC executives are reluctant, but they eventually agree to let Bob promote the song on the radio ("Radio Ga Ga").

Margaret Thatcher refuses to waive the government tax (VAT) on sales of the record. She claims everyone would like to keep the tax they pay and that people should not rely on charity ("Stop Your Sobbing"). Meanwhile, Amara is furious that wealthy celebrities released a song pretending to care about the famine in Ethiopia. She explains her heartbreak not having enough food to feed the hundreds of starving children. At the record shop, Suzanne and Tim debate buying the records and not knowing where the funds are going. Tim is dismissive of their ability to make change, leaving Suzanne heartbroken and determined to sell as many copies of the record as she can by herself ("We Are the Champions"). Suzanne and Tim later reconcile.

Bob is angered by the media focusing on him and not on the famine in Ethiopia, while Jemma laments the media is missing the point about what Bob is trying to achieve. Bob learns American musicians are recording their own charity record ("We Are the World"). At a party, Bob meets Suzanne and Tim who convince him he needs to go to Ethiopia to see how the money is being used ("You're the Best Thing"). He also meets John Kennedy, who encourages him to establish a charitable trust. Bob finally demands to meet Margaret, who still refuses to waive the tax ("I'm Still Standing").

Bob travels to Ethiopia, where Amara explains the harsh reality of famine. Bob is brought to tears by the devastation ("Bad"). As Amara explains the cartel and government dictatorship keep the money and food, Bob becomes more determined to mobilize efforts and raise even more money to deliver directly to the aid workers ("Message in a Bottle").

=== Act II ===
Suzanne explains to Jemma that Harvey Goldsmith was Britain's biggest concert promoter ("Pinball Wizard"). Even though Bob and Harvey both refuse to compromise, they agree to work together. At the press conference, the media are still critical of Bob's motivations and question if any musicians will actually participate. Bob takes control by announcing Mick Jagger and David Bowie are recording a song together, and dismisses Harvey and John's concerns about who is paying for everything and being able to get all the famous musicians to actually participate. Harvey complains about Bob's elaborate vision for Live Aid and his controlling nature, until John shocks everyone when he reveals Paul McCartney has agreed to participate ("Dancing in the Street"). After skipping out on her exam, Suzanne is heartbroken Live Aid tickets are sold out until Tim arrives with tickets ("Summer of '69"). Meanwhile, Amara listens to the radio promote Live Aid, and she prays this will actually work ("Blowin' in the Wind").

In a tense meeting, Harvey storms off after another fight with Bob. Marsha scolds Bob saying that she, John, and Tim have been working tirelessly to bring his dream to life and he cannot give up. Back in the present-day, Suzanne marvels at the impressive lineup on the Live Aid poster, while Jemma questions the lack of racial diversity. Back in 1985, Margaret requests to meet with Bob and tries to convince him to understand her perspective ("Reach Out and Touch"). Bob threatens to convince everyone to vote against her, which leads to Margaret agreeing to make a donation equal to the amount of the taxes received from the record sales. The night before Live Aid, Bob is unable to sleep because of fear and self-doubt ("In the Air Tonight / Why Can't We Live Together").

In the present-day, Suzanne gives her ticket to Jemma as Live Aid begins ("We Will Rock You / King of Rock"). As Midge Ure performs, Harvey begins to stress about keeping the event running on time ("Vienna"). Harvey and Suzanne encourage a nervous Bob to go on stage and perform ("I Don't Like Mondays"). Marsha and Jim run off to have sex ("All You Need Is Love"), and Suzanne and Tim share their first kiss ("Against All Odds"). With a lack of donations coming in, Bob goes on national television and swears as he asks people to give their money to the cause. John and Midge are ecstatic with the donations suddenly flowing in, as the concert continues ("Rebel Rebel / Don't You (Forget About Me) / Into the Groove"). Marsha and Jim marvel at the event that they helped pull off ("Bohemian Rhapsody").

Back in the present-day, Jemma realizes why Suzanne loved Live Aid and wishes they could bottle that spirit. Bob reflects that music cannot make a change, but it can bring people together. Suzanne and Bob also explain how twenty years later Live 8 was held to combat global poverty, and that the same problems still exist another twenty years later in 2024. Bob and Suzanne encourage Jemma to keep asking question and to not stop fighting for change ("My Generation").

Live Aid comes to a close: Bob thanks everyone for their hard work, Amara is grateful for the supplies they received, while Bob realizes that younger generations are rising up and challenging the injustices they see in the world ("Let It Be").

== Production history ==
=== The Old Vic, London (2024) ===
Just for One Day received its world premiere at The Old Vic in London, and was directed by Luke Shepard, choreography by Ebony Molina, and set design by Soutra Gilmour. Performances began on 26 January 2024, in previews, with an official opening night on 13 February 2024. The production closed on 30 March 2024. The musical was the Old Vic's fastest-selling production and was sold out during the show's nine-week run.

The musical was produced by Bob Geldof and Band Aid's permission.

=== Toronto (2025) ===
The show had its North American premiere at the Ed Mirvish Theatre, in Toronto. The musical began performances on 28 January 2025 and closed on the 16 March 2025.

=== West End (2025) ===
On 15 September 2024, it was announced that the musical would transfer to the West End. Performances began on 15 May 2025 at the Shaftesbury Theatre. It was also announced that a special gala performance would be held on 13 July 2025, to celebrate the 40th anniversary of Live Aid. The West End production will close on 7 February 2026 following a 9 month run.

=== UK and Ireland tour (2027) ===
Following the West End run, the musical will begin a UK and Ireland tour at the Curve, Leicester on 31 March 2027.

== Musical numbers ==
All of the songs in the musical were also songs performed by artists at Live Aid. Many of the songs are performed by ensemble members of the cast as the events of the musical occur.

Act I

- "Heroes" – Company
- "Rat Trap" – Bob and Company
- "Drive" – Amara and Company
- "Dancing with Tears in My Eyes" – Midge and Company
- "Everytime You Go Away" / "True" / "Every Breath You Take" – Midge, Jim, Marsha and Company
- "Do They Know It's Christmas?" – Bob, Midge, and Company
- "Radio Ga Ga" – Company
- "We Are the Champions" – Suzanne and Company
- "Stop Your Sobbing" – Margaret
- "You're the Best Thing" – Company
- "I'm Still Standing" – Margaret, Bob, and Company
- "We Are the World" – Company
- "Bad" – Company
- "Message in a Bottle" – Company

Act II

- "Pinball Wizard" – Harvey and Company
- "Dancing in the Street" – Marsha, Jim, and Company
- "Summer of '69" – Company
- "Blowin' in the Wind" – Amara and Company
- "Reach Out and Touch" – Margaret
- "In the Air Tonight" / "Why Can't We Live Together" – Company
- "We Will Rock You" / "King of Rock" – John and Company
- "Rockin' All Over the World" – Harvey and Company
- "Vienna" – Midge
- "I Don't Like Mondays" – Bob and Company
- "All You Need Is Love" – Company
- "Against All Odds" – John and Company
- "Rebel Rebel" / "Don't You (Forget About Me)" / "Into the Groove" – Company
- "Bohemian Rhapsody" – Company
- "My Generation" – Jemma and Company
- "Let It Be" / "Tears Are Not Enough" – Company*

*Added in the Toronto/West End production

- “Last Christmas” was added into “Radio Ga Ga” when referencing the opposing Christmas single to “Do We Know It’s Christmas” in 1984.
- "Tears Are Not Enough", the 1985 charity single recorded by a supergroup of Canadian artists, was added as a medley to "Let It Be" in the Toronto production.

=== Cast recording ===
In March 2024, it was confirmed that there will be a cast recording of the musical. This announcement was accompanied by the release of Naomi Katiyo's version of "My Generation". On May 1st 2025, it was announced at the launch event for its run in London that the Just for One Day - The Live Aid Musical (Original Cast Recording) will be released on July 11th 2025.

== Principal cast and characters ==
Just for One Day is an ensemble show with a large supporting cast, who play various roles such as real-life people, various staff at Live Aid, and audience members. Below are the characters who are most prominently featured in the musical.

=== Cast ===
Character	London	Toronto	West End
Character	2024	2025	
Bob Geldof	Craige Els	Craige Els	Craige Els
Suzanne	Jackie Clune	Melissa Jacques	Melissa Jacques
Young Suzanne	Hope Kenna	Hope Kenna	Hope Kenna
Jemma	Naomi Katiyo	Fayth Ifil	Fayth Ifil
Midge Ure	Jack Shalloo	George Ure	George Ure
Amara	Abiona Omonua	Rhianne-Louise McCaulsky	Rhianne-Louise McCaulsky
Margaret Thatcher	Julie Atherton	Julie Atherton	Julie Atherton
Tim	Joe Edgar	Jack Michael Stacey	Jack Michael Stacey
Marsha	Danielle Steers	Kelly Agbowu	Kelly Agbowu
Jim	Ashley Campbell	Ashley Samuels	Ashley Samuels
Harvey Goldsmith and others	Joel Montague	Tim Mahendran	Tim Mahendran
John Kennedy and others	Olly Dobson	Jake Small	Jake Small

=== Characters ===
- Bob Geldof: a musician turned political activist, who is motivated to raise awareness and money for the famine in Ethiopia
- Suzanne: a superfan who attended Live Aid; Suzanne (2024) narrates and reflects on her experiences, as portrayed by Suzanne (1985)
- Jemma: a Generation Z teenager learning about Live Aid in class, and interested in learning about Live Aid so her generation can learn from their mistakes
- Midge Ure: a musician and co-organizer of Live Aid
- Amara: an aid worker in Ethiopia
- Margaret Thatcher: the Prime Minister of the United Kingdom during Live Aid
- Tim: a friend of Suzanne who also attended Live Aid
- Marsha: produced Band Aid's charity single and helped plan Live Aid
- Jim: worked as a sound technician at Live Aid
- Harvey Goldsmith: a British concert promoter
- John Kennedy: a British entertainment lawyer who helps Bob organize Live Aid and set up the charitable fund

== Critical reception ==
The original production at The Old Vic received mixed reviews.

In a positive review, Dominic Cavendish of The Daily Telegraph called it a "rip-roaring, nostalgia-stirring new juke-box musical". Cavendish also praised the cast, the handling of the music, and its powerful call-to-action. David Benedict of Variety similarly praised the musical's good intentions and the strength of the cast, but was critical of the awkward writing. In a mixed review, Clive Davis of The Sunday Times praised the show's live band but criticized the script and felt the show was too celebratory about Live Aid. Alice Saville of The Independent also gave a mixed review, saying that the show was powerful but sometimes felt like Bob Geldof's "tribute to himself". Meanwhile, the Evening Standard's Farah Najib praised the strong cast performances and felt the musical had sincere intentions but was too "sanitised" and came across as "white saviourism". Arif Akbar of The Guardian was more negative, praising the "sonic spectacle" of the musical and Els' portrayal of Bob Geldof, but was critical about the poor character development and lack of focus on the ethics of celebrity charity.

== Awards and nominations ==
=== London production ===
Year	Award	Category	Nominee	Result
2024	Laurence Olivier Award	Outstanding Musical Contribution (Musical Supervision, Arrangements & Orchestrations)	Matt Brind	Nominated
