= Olly Dobson =

English actor and singer

- Education: Arts Educational Schools (BA)
- Occupations: Actor, singer

Olly Dobson is an English singer and actor, best known for his work in musical theatre. He originated the role of Marty McFly in the musical adaptation of Back to the Future, for which he was nominated for an Olivier Award for Best Actor in a Musical. Dobson has also appeared in the original productions of Bat Out of Hell and Just for One Day.

== Personal life ==
Dobson graduated from Arts Educational Schools in 2014, where he received an honours Bachelor's degree in musical theatre.

== Career ==
Dobson's first professional stage role was in a production of Carrie, where he played Freddy. The musical played at the Southwark Playhouse between 1 May and 30 May 2015. Later that year, Dobson made his West End debut when he began playing Michael Wormwood in Matilda the Musical.

In 2017, Dobson appeared in Bat Out of Hell, where he was part of the ensemble and understudied the roles of Jagwire and Ledoux. The musical premiered at the Manchester Opera House, where it played between 17 February and 8 April 2017. He continued with the role when it played on the West End at the London Coliseum for a limited engagement between 20 June 2017 and 22 July 2017. Dobson also reprised his roles in theToronto production of Bat out of Hell, which played at the Ed Mirvish Theatre between 25 October 2017 and 7 January 2018.

Dobson then played the dual role of Ben/Hail in The Selfish Giant. The musical premiered at the Royal Theatre in Northampton in April 2018, before playing a limited engagement at the Vaudeville Theatre in the West End between 10 and 13 April 2018.

Dobson starred as Marty McFly in the original production of Back to the Future, which premiered at the Manchester Opera House; it began performances on 20 February 2020 before closing on 16 March 2020 due to the COVID-19 pandemic. Dobson also played the role in the original West End production, when it began performances at the Adelphi Theatre on 13 September 2021. At the 2022 Laurence Olivier Awards, Dobson was nominated for the Olivier Award for Best Actor in a Musical. He left the show in August 2022.

In 2024, Dobson played John and others in Just for One Day. The original production played at The Old Vic between 26 January 2024 and 30 March 2024. From 2 September 2024 until 9 November 2024, Dobson played the role of Mel Miller in the original production of A Face in the Crowd at the Young Vic.

== Theatre credits ==
Year	Production	Role	Location	Category	Ref.
2015	Carrie	Freddy	Southwark Playhouse		
2015–2016	Matilda the Musical	Michael Wormwood	Cambridge Theatre	West End	
2017	Bat Out of Hell	Ensemble, u/s Jagwire, Ledoux	Manchester Opera House	Original	
2017	Bat Out of Hell	Ensemble, u/s Jagwire, Ledoux	London Coliseum	West End	
2017–2018	Bat Out of Hell	Ensemble, u/s Jagwire, Ledoux	Ed Mirvish Theatre	Toronto	
2018	The Selfish Giant	Ben/Hail	Royal Theatre	Original	
2018	The Selfish Giant	Ben/Hail	Vaudeville Theatre	West End	
2020	Back to the Future	Marty McFly	Manchester Opera House	Original	
2021–2022	Back to the Future	Marty McFly	Adelphi Theatre	West End	
2022	Emojiland	Skull	Garrick Theatre	West End: Concert staging	
2024	Just for One Day	John and others	The Old Vic	Original	
2024	A Face in the Crowd	Mel Miller	The Old Vic	Original	

== Awards and nominations ==
Year	Award	Category	Nominated work	Result	Ref.
2021	BroadwayWorld UK Awards	Best Leading Performer in a Musical	Back to the Future	Won	
2022	Olivier Awards	Best Actor in a Musical	Back to the Future	Nominated	
2022	WhatsOnStage Awards	Best Actor in a Musical	Back to the Future	Nominated	
