= Babies (musical) =

Musical written by Jack Godfrey and Martha Geelan

Babies is a pop musical by Jack Godfrey (creator of 42 Balloons and Hot Mess) and Martha Geelan. It tells the story of a class of Year 11 school children being assigned to look after animatronic babies to learn about parenting, and deter them from teenage pregnancy.

At first, the class of teenagers seem to fit some of the classic stereotypes: the driven high achiever, the popular girl, the loner who does not want to mix, the one who is desperate to be part of the popular crowd. As the musical develops, more is revealed about the complexities of their lives and their hidden depths.

== Songs ==
The story is told through a series of mostly pop-style songs, including:

- Baby Baby Baby
- Hot Dad
- Without Saying Goodbye
- Jasmine's Soliloquy
- Someone Else

== Performances ==
- 2021 – New Wolsey Theatre, Ipswich – British Youth Music Theatre
- 2023 – Lyric Theatre. Staged Concert Performances
- 2024 – The Other Palace, London West End

== Reviews ==
- London Theatre Reviews called it "an exhilarating new British musical in what is an increasingly exciting scene", and gave it 4 stars.
- London Theatre gave it 4 stars, calling it "sweetly affecting", but pointing out that teenage parents do not have the option to give up on their babies, but the kids do realise they are not ready to grow up.
- Musicals Magazine called it "jam-packed with catchy tunes, endearing characters, pathos and humour."

== Awards ==
- BYMT New Music Theatre Award 2021
