= Bradley Dean =

American stage and screen actor

- Born: Bradley Dean; June 18, 1970 (age 56); Pottsville, Pennsylvania, U.S.
- Education: Carnegie Mellon University
- Occupations: Actor, singer
- Years active: 1991–present
- Website: www.bradleydean.net

Bradley Dean (born June 18, 1970) is an American stage and screen actor.

== Early life ==
Dean is originally from Pottsville, Pennsylvania. He is a graduate of Carnegie Mellon University.

== Career ==
=== Theatre ===
==== Broadway theatre ====
Dean made his Broadway debut as a swing in Jane Eyre in 2000. Additional Broadway credits include Man of La Mancha, Company, and The Story of My Life. On March 25, 2008, Dean succeeded Christopher Sieber in the role of Sir Galahad in the musical comedy Spamalot on Broadway. From December 2009 until January 2011, Dean starred in the revival of A Little Night Music, first as Frid, and then later as Count Carl-Magnus opposite Bernadette Peters.

Dean has also had roles in the Broadway productions of the 2012 Evita revival, Sting's The Last Ship, and Doctor Zhivago, where he stepped in as the lead for several performances during previews while principal lead Tam Mutu was ill. He was also a standby for the role of Larry Murphy in Dear Evan Hansen in 2016.

On September 11, 2019, Dean assumed the role of opera manager Monsieur Gilles Andre in The Phantom of the Opera on Broadway. He is the 8th man to play the role in the Broadway production. He played Molokov in the 2022 Broadway concert of Chess and reprised the role in the 2025 fully staged revival. He also appeared in the Idina Menzel-led Redwood.

==== Other theatre ====
Dean began his professional career in 1991 performing in a number of musicals at the Pittsburgh Civic Light Opera, including Camelot, No, No, Nanette, Evita, South Pacific, and The Pirates of Penzance.

Dean toured internationally in Europe as Frank-n-Furter in 1998 and 1999. He donned the mask as title character Erik in Maury Yeston & Arthur Kopit's Phantom in 2003 at the Gateway Playhouse in Bellport, NY. In 2004–2005, he played Che in the national tour of Evita. He also appeared as Sir Galahad in the first national tour of Spamalot in 2006. He originated the role of Manuel in the off-Broadway musical Walmartopia in 2007. In 2011, Dean appeared in the world premiere of the new musical Little Miss Sunshine at La Jolla Playhouse.

Dean has appeared in two musicals at New York City Center Encores!: Giuseppe in The Most Happy Fella in 2014 and Dr. Jafar in A New Brain in 2015.

In early 2016, Dean played Archibald Craven in an Off-Broadway benefit staging of The Secret Garden opposite Max von Essen as his brother Neville and Rebecca Luker reprising her role of Lily from the original Broadway cast. Later that year, he toured Korea in the world tour of Jekyll & Hyde, in which he split the portrayal of the title roles with Kyle Dean Massey at certain performances.

Dean was the final person to play El Gallo in The Fantasticks, which closed off-Broadway in 2017 after 57 years in New York.

In February 2018, Dean played Alexander Molokov in the Kennedy Center production of Chess. 2018 also saw him as the title roles in Jekyll & Hyde at Casa Mañana in Texas and as Mr. Andrews in Titanic at the Pittsburgh Civic Light Opera.

In October 2018, Dean played Falco in the North American touring production of Jim Steinman's Bat Out of Hell. On November 1, 2018, the tour was unexpectedly cancelled by its producers and only played through its initial run in Toronto at the Ed Mirvish Theatre. Dean reprised his role as Falco for the New York City Center production of the show, which ran from August 1 to September 8, 2019.

=== Television ===
Screen credits include roles in Person of Interest, All My Children, One Life to Live, and Guiding Light.
