= Chris Jenkins (actor) =

Welsh actor (born 1987)

- Born: Christopher Robert Jenkins; 6 December 1987 (age 38); Wales
- Occupations: Actor, singer
- Years active: 2008 – present

Chris Jenkins (born Christopher Robert Jenkins; 6 December 1987) is a Welsh actor. He grew up in Penarth, Vale of Glamorgan, Wales attending Stanwell School. He received his theatre training at Guildford School of Acting graduating in 2009.

He has been in a relationship with actor Daniel Boys, since 2014.

== Credits ==
Theatre
Year	Title	Role	Theatre	Location
2009	A Midsummer Night's Dream	Demetrius/Fight Director	Welsh Tour	Wales
2009	Super Alice Smith	Callum	Trafalgar Studios	West End
2010	The Cradle Will Rock	Larry Foreman	Arcola Theatre	London
2011	The Umbrellas Of Cherbourg	Swing (u/s Guy/Cassard)	Gielgud Theatre	West End
2011	South Pacific	Swing/Assistant Dance Captain	UK Tour	UK
2012-2014	Spamalot	Ensemble (u/s Galahad/Bedevere/Lancelot)	Playhouse Theatre	West End
2014	Billy Elliot	Ensemble (u/s Tony)	Victoria Palace Theatre	West End
2016	Jeff Wayne's The War Of The Worlds	NASA/Ensemble (u/s Voice of Humanity/Artilleryman)	Dominion Theatre	West End
2016	The Burnt Part Boys	Jake	Park Theatre	London
2017	tick, tick...BOOM!	Jonathan	Park Theatre	London
2018	Candide	Maximillian	Iford Arts	UK
2018	The Arcadians	Bobbie	Wilton's Music Hall	London
2018	The Return Of The Soldier	Christopher Baldry	Hope Mill Theatre	Manchester
2019	Titanic The Musical	Charles Lightoller	Chinese Tour	China
2021	All That	Riley	Kings Head	London
2022	Jack Absolute Flies Again	Ensemble (u/s Bob Acres/Dudley Scunthorpe)	Olivier, National Theatre	London
2022	Hex	Prince/Ensemble (u/s Bruiser)	Olivier, National Theatre	London
2023	Groundhog Day	Gus	The Old Vic	London
2024	A Face in the Crowd	Ensemble	Young Vic	London
2026	Pride	Gethin	Sherman Theatre and National Theatre	Cardiff and London

Television & Film
Year	Title	Role	Type
2010	Loose Ends	Iwan	Short Film
2016	Settled	Tim	Short Film
2019	Sanditon	Regency Dancer	TV Series
2020	It's A Sin	Welsh PC	TV Series
2022	Kingslayer	Mercenary Crossbowman	Feature
2022	Mab Hudel	Enys	Short Film

Recordings
Year	Title	Role	Venue	Type
2008	Chess in Concert	Chorus	Royal Albert Hall	DVD/CD
2010	Simon Boccanegra	Boccanegra's Guard	Royal Opera House	Live Recording/PBS
2014	Billy Elliot the Musical Live	Ensemble	Victoria Palace Theatre	DVD
2022	Jack Absolute Flies Again	Ensemble	Olivier, National Theatre	NT Live/NT At Home
2023	Hex	Prince/Ensemble	Olivier, National Theatre	NT At Home
