= Emma Portner =

Canadian dancer, choreographer and musician (born 1994)

- Born: November 26, 1994 (age 31); Ottawa, Ontario, Canada
- Occupations: Choreographer, dancer
- Years active: 2015–present
- Spouse: Elliot Page (m. 2018; div. 2021)

Emma Portner (born November 26, 1994) is a Canadian professional dancer and choreographer.

== Early life ==
Portner was born in Ottawa, Ontario and began dancing when she was three years old. She started dancing at a competitive studio in Ottawa before spending her summers with The National Ballet of Canada. While in Ottawa, she also attended Canterbury High School's specialized arts program in the dance stream. When she was 17, she moved from Ottawa, Ontario to New York City to train at The Ailey School. She dropped out after 5 months to begin her professional career.

== Career ==
Portner created some of the choreography for Jim Steinman's Bat Out of Hell: The Musical. In 2015, she choreographed and starred in Justin Bieber's music video for his song "Life is Worth Living". She also created choreography for Bieber's Purpose World Tour.

In 2019, she was nominated for Arena Dance Competition's "Best Female Dancer" of the year. Paper magazine also listed Portner in "PAPER Predictions; 100 people to watch in 2019". Portner has appeared on the covers of the magazines Dance Spirit and Dance Magazine.

As of 2020, her work has been displayed in a variety of environments including Apple, Netflix, Vogue, Sony Pictures, late night television and in professional ballet. She has movement directed indie music stars such as Blood Orange, Maggie Rogers, Half Alive and BANKS and performed at prestigious venues like the Guggenheim Museum, Jacob's Pillow, the Oslo Opera House, New York City Center and Theater Champs-Élysées.

In 2021, Portner's first ballet and acclaimed work "Islands" for the Norwegian National Ballet was selected to tour with culture shaping choreographers Crystal Pite, Jiri Kylian, and Ohad Naharin. At 26 years old, she received a glowing review stating that "Emma Portner shines extra bright in Dialogues Star Parade" and "in an evening bursting with movement, one of the least known choreographers stood out".

In 2021, Portner portrayed Gozer the Gozerian in Ghostbusters: Afterlife, a role shared with an uncredited Olivia Wilde and vocally with Shohreh Aghdashloo.

She is the lead vocalist of Bunk Buddy, an indie music duo composed of her and producer Noah Rubin.

== Personal life ==
Portner has declined to speak publicly about her own gender identity and sexual orientation, but had previously identified as a lesbian.

In January 2018, actor Elliot Page announced his marriage to Portner on an unspecified date. The couple met after Page noticed Portner on Instagram. In December 2020, Page publicly came out as a trans man. Portner expressed support for his coming out that same day on her Instagram account, saying she was "so proud" of him Page filed for divorce in January 2021, and the divorce was finalized in early 2021.
