= A Face in the Crowd (musical) =

Musical based on the film of the same name

- Music: Elvis Costello
- Lyrics: Elvis Costello
- Book: Sarah Ruhl
- Basis: A Face in the Crowd by Budd Schulberg
- Premiere: 12 September 2024: Young Vic, London
- Productions: 2024 London

A Face in the Crowd is a musical with music and lyrics by Elvis Costello, book by Sarah Ruhl, based on the short story and 1957 film of the same name by Budd Schulberg.

== Production history ==
=== World premiere: London (2024) ===
The musical had its world premiere at the Young Vic, London beginning previews on 12 September 2024, running until 9 November. It is directed by Kwame Kwei-Armah (in his final show as artistic director of the Young Vic), designed by Anna Fleischle and choreographed by Lizzi Gee with a cast including Ramin Karimloo as Lonesome Rhodes and Anoushka Lucas as Marcia Jeffries.

== Cast and characters ==
Character	London
Character	2024
Swing and Assistant Choreographer	Jasmin Colangelo
Ensemble	Andrew Coshan
Joey De Palma	Stavros Demetraki
Mel Miller	Olly Dobson
Sheriff Hosmer / Ensemble	Howard Gossington
Ensemble	Chris Jenkins
Lonesome Rhodes	Ramin Karimloo
Marcia Jeffries	Anoushka Lucas
Ensemble	Sadie-Jean Shirley
Ensemble	Durone Stokes
Ensemble	Vicki Lee Taylor
Ensemble	Annie Wensak
Swing	Bobby Windebank
