= The Selfish Giant (folk opera) =

Folk opera by Guy Chambers

- Cover of the soundtrack
- Music: Guy Chambers
- Lyrics: Guy Chambers
- Book: Guy Chambers
- Basis: The Selfish Giant by Oscar Wilde
- Premiere: 4 April 2018: Royal Theatre, Northampton
- Productions: 2018 Northampton; 2018 London

The Selfish Giant is a folk opera composed and adapted by English songwriter Guy Chambers, based on the short story by Oscar Wilde (as part of The Happy Prince and Other Tales).

== Production ==
The folk opera was produced by Classic Spring (Dominic Dromgoole's production company) as part of their Oscar Wilde season in a concert staging directed by Bill Buckhurst, designed by Simon Kenny and choreographed by Imogen Knight. It opened at the Royal Theatre, Northampton from 4 to 7 April 2018, followed by a run in London's West End at the Vaudeville Theatre from 10 to 14 April 2018.

Chambers' recording studio released the accompanying soundtrack to the folk opera Sleeper Sounds on 5 April 2018 on CD and digital.

== Cast and characters ==
Character	Cast
Girl/Narrator	Natasha Cottrial
Ben/Hail	Olly Dobson
Boy	Jacob Fisher
Girl/Narrator	Izuka Hoyle
The Giant	Jeff Nicholson
Girl/Little Boy	Rose Shalloo
Girl/Narrator	Laura Sillett
Boy	Scott Sutcliffe
Charlie	Laila Zaidi

== Track list ==
All tracks are written by Guy Chambers.

No.	Title	Length
1.	"Overture"	0:43
2.	"There Will Be Sun"	2:01
3.	"Giant's Garden"	4:30
4.	"Fruit Picking Song"	3:02
5.	"One Day the Giant Came Back"	0:30
6.	"The Angry Giant"	2:12
7.	"Trespassers Will Be Prosecuted"	1:48
8.	"Building A Wall"	1:48
9.	"We Don't Know Why"	1:56
10.	"Winter Has Come"	2:24
11.	"Then the Spring Came"	3:54
12.	"Where There's a Will There's a Way"	2:04
13.	"The Elements"	3:02
14.	"He Likes to Turn the Rain to Ice"	2:33
15.	"Selfish Giant"	3:56
16.	"I Believe the Spring Has Come at Last"	3:01
17.	"The Children Have Returned"	2:27
18.	"How Selfish I Have Been"	1:57
19.	"Climb Little Boy"	2:27
20.	"It's Your Garden Now"	2:21
21.	"Where Is The Boy"	3:25
22.	"Wounds of Love"	7:03
23.	"Epilogue"	0:43
24.	"Bells at 12 Reprise"	3:01
25.	"Magical Love"	3:01
Total length:		75:00
