= Bat Out of Hell: The Musical =

Rock musical by Jim Steinman

Bat Out of Hell
- The Musical
- Music: Jim Steinman
- Lyrics: Jim Steinman
- Book: Jim Steinman
- Basis: Bat Out of Hell by Meat Loaf
- Premiere: February 17, 2017: Manchester Opera House, Manchester
- Productions: 2017 Manchester; 2017 West End; 2017 Toronto; 2018 North American Tour; 2018 West End revival; 2018 Oberhausen; 2019 New York City; 2020 International Tour; 2025 UK Tour

Bat Out of Hell: The Musical (promoted as Jim Steinman's Bat Out of Hell: The Musical) is a rock musical with music, lyrics and book by Jim Steinman, partly based on the Bat Out of Hell album by Meat Loaf. Steinman wrote all of the songs, most of which are on the Bat Out of Hell trilogy of albums (Bat Out of Hell, Bat Out of Hell II: Back into Hell, and Bat Out of Hell III: The Monster Is Loose). The musical is a loose retelling of Peter Pan, set in post-apocalyptic Manhattan (now named 'Obsidian'), and follows Strat, the forever young leader of 'The Lost' who has fallen in love with Raven, daughter of Falco, the tyrannical ruler of Obsidian. Steinman has said in interviews that a version of the Peter Pan story inspired some of the songs on the 1977 album Bat Out of Hell, and that is the connection between this musical and the 1977 album. Before the album Bat Out of Hell was released, Steinman worked on a musical of that storyline that was then called "Neverland".

The musical premiered at the Manchester Opera House in Manchester, England, on February 17, 2017, and ran there until April 29, 2017. The production was directed by Jay Scheib and choreographed by Emma Portner. It was produced by David Sonenberg, Michael Cohl, Randy Lennox and Tony Smith. The show originally starred Andrew Polec as Strat and Christina Bennington as Raven, with Rob Fowler as Falco and Sharon Sexton as Sloane.

The show opened at the London Coliseum on June 5, 2017, and ran there until August 22, 2017, before moving to Toronto, from October 14, to January 7, 2018. The musical returned to London and to the Dominion Theatre on April 2, 2018. An original cast recording album was released by BOOH Label on October 20, 2017. In 2023 the show was taken on an international tour (UK, Ireland, Germany and Australia) returning to the Peacock Theatre in London in 2023. In 2025 the show returned for a UK tour, returning to the Peacock Theatre in May/June, before going on to other UK cities.

== Background ==
In 1968, while at Amherst College, Jim Steinman wrote a newspaper article about the contemporary issues of the time, then decided to turn that into a rock musical called The Dream Engine, working with fellow student Barry Keating, who became the show's director. The Dream Engine starred Steinman as Baal, the charismatic 19-year-old leader of a tribe of semi-feral youths in California, and showed Baal's interactions with tribe members and recruits (inductions involving pain rituals) and various adult authority figures (the chief of police, a draft board representative, a psychiatrist, and killer nuns). Staging was very much influenced by Bertolt Brecht and The Living Theatre. It also contained the song "Who Needs The Young" and the "Hot Summer Nights" speech, which are in Bat Out Of Hell: The Musical.

Rights to The Dream Engine were bought by Joseph Papp of the New York Shakespeare Festival in April 1969, and upon his graduation that summer, Steinman was recruited to refine his work for larger productions, but these productions never took shape. By 1973, Papp moved Steinman from The Dream Engine and put him to work on the rock musical More Than You Deserve, where Steinman met the actor and singer Meat Loaf.

In August 1974, Steinman wrote to Papp to say he had rewritten much of The Dream Engine and it was now a musical called Neverland. Steinman was unable to secure the rights from the J. M. Barrie estate to put on the musical as it was.

Throughout 1975, Meat Loaf, Steinman, Ellen Foley, and others worked on the National Lampoon Road Show, substituting for John Belushi and Gilda Radner who had left to work on Saturday Night Live. During this time, Steinman wrote most of the songs for the album Bat Out of Hell and began to rehearse and record them with Meat Loaf and Foley.

In early 1977, Steinman went to Washington, D.C. to work on a workshop production of Neverland, which had many of the core elements of The Dream Engine, but was now a futuristic sci-fi interpretation of Peter Pan. Foley starred as Wendy. In September 1977, the Bat Out of Hell album was released.

In the late 1990s, Neverland was rewritten into a film script called Bat Out of Hell 2100, including earlier songs by Steinman such as "Who Needs The Young", "All Revved Up With No Place To Go", and the song "Bat Out Of Hell", "It's All Coming Back to Me Now", "Objects In The Rear View Mirror", and "I'd Do Anything For Love". It draws more from the Peter Pan story, with characters including Peter, Wendy, Police Chief Captain Hook, Doctor Darling, and Mother Superior.

In 2008, Bat Out Of Hell: The Musical was announced. In 2015 a developmental lab for the show took place in New York, and in late 2016 a cast was assembled for the first public production, in the U.K, which premiered in Manchester UK in February 2017.

== Plot ==
=== Act One ===
In the dystopian city of Obsidian, Strat recalls his first encounter with rock and roll ("Love and Death and an American Guitar (Strat's Soliloquy)") before his DNA froze, causing him to remain eighteen forever. (In later UK productions, this scene is performed by Raven.)

Strat is the leader of a group of teens who are all frozen in eternal youth - Tink, Zahara, Jagwire, Ledoux, and Valkyrie, among others - and who call themselves 'the Lost'. Strat and the Lost march in the square outside Falco Towers, home of the city's tyrannical leader of the same name, which leads to a scuffle ("All Revved Up with No Place to Go" / "Wasted Youth"). Falco's teenage daughter Raven, who has been forbidden from leaving Falco Towers, sneaks into the fray and is drawn to Strat's discarded shirt. Picking it up, her eyes meet Strat's, but she is immediately rushed back inside by her mother Sloane. Falco himself joins the fight, injuring Strat's best friend Tink; he suffers a facial injury when Ledoux breaks a bottle over his head, but manages to drive the Lost away.

At Falco Towers, Falco dismisses a resentful Raven and shares his latest political plans with Sloane: he intends to propose a housing project which will revive Obsidian, but destroy the disused tunnels and subways where masses of unhoused people live, including the Lost. They lament their long-gone youth and dismiss the Lost as unimportant ("Who Needs the Young?"). Meanwhile, Raven and Strat have a brief encounter; as she dons his shirt, he briefly climbs into her room and steals a magazine with her picture on the cover. He startles her, but he ducks out as her mother enters. When Raven inquires about the origins of the Lost, Sloane explains that during a period of chemical warfare 25 years prior, the teenagers were stuck in an earthquake and exposed to a poison that froze their aging. She then gives Raven an early 18th birthday present - Falco's old biker jacket - and encourages her to be free and fall in love.

The following day, 'The Lost' are gathered in their hideaway, 'the Deep End,' located in a disused subway near the 81st Street–Museum of Natural History station. Tink crashes his bicycle, then challenges Jagwire, to a fight, but is stopped by Strat, who tends Tink's wounds and tussles with him. Tink and Zahara both flirt with Strat and attempt to kiss him; he gently rebuffs Tink and asks Zahara, 'On a hot summer night, would you offer your throat to the wolf with the red roses?', unsettling her. As Strat ignores Zahara's departing advice to forget about Raven, the Lost briefly discuss kidnapping her for ransom and encourage Strat to pursue her romantically ("Out of the Frying Pan And Into the Fire"). Meanwhile, outside of Falco Towers, Jagwire attempts to reestablish a prior romantic relationship with Zahara, but she cannot get over her first love and gently rejects him ("Two Out of Three Ain't Bad").

At Falco Towers, Falco and Sloane throw a party for Raven to celebrate her eighteenth birthday, much to her chagrin. Raven asks again for the freedom to explore the subways and meet the Lost, which Falco bluntly and firmly refuses. Sloane attempts to brighten the atmosphere, but is quickly pulled into a reverie of her youthful trysts with Falco, causing Raven to flee in frustration and disgust ("Paradise by the Dashboard Light"). Zahara appears in Raven's bedroom, dressed a nurse, and administers 'dream suppressant' medication to her; Falco and Sloane enter as well, to apologize and put her to bed. Strat sneaks in through the window, startling a sleeping Raven; he asks her the same question he posed to Zahara, but she is too distracted to notice it. After Raven stops a disappointed Strat from leaving, they have a heart-to-heart talk and Strat invites her to go out with him for one night ("Making Love Out of Nothing at All"). Just as they are about to give in to their desires, a frantic Zahara interrupts to warn them that Falco is coming and has already invaded the Deep End. Strat and Raven escape through her bedroom window.

Strat and Raven rendezvous with Jagwire, who is quickly apprehended by Falco's militia. On Strat's motorbike, Raven has second thoughts about going with him ("Bat Out of Hell"). Halfway through the ride, Raven's fear of her father's retribution prompts her to jump off the bike and run away. After a moment of devastated reflection, Strat remounts his motorbike and zooms ahead at full speed off the Atlantic Ocean cliffs, when he 'misses' a sudden curve. His motorbike shatters and crushes him, seemingly killing him.

=== Act Two ===
At the start of Act Two, Falco has invaded the Deep End, captured several members of the Lost, and confined them in the prison basement of Falco Towers. As Falco gleefully tortures Jagwire, Zahara appears in her nurse outfit, holding Strat's bloodied shirt. She grimly informs Falco, Sloane, Raven, and the Lost that Strat has died; Raven breaks down and is taken away by Zahara and Sloane, leaving Falco and his militia to torture the Lost ("In the Land of the Pig, the Butcher Is King"). Raven mourns Strat's death ("Heaven Can Wait"). Below, the Lost express their shock, prompting Jagwire, Blake and Ledoux to share their pasts ("Objects in the Rear View Mirror May Appear Closer Than They Are"). Fed up with Falco's tyrannical behavior, Sloane sneaks into the basement and frees the Lost.

(In the 2021-2022 and 2025 UK Tours, "In The Land of the Pig..." is cut. Instead, Raven accuses Falco of murdering Strat and flees; Falco is deliberately vague with Sloane when she asks him whether he was truly responsible. "Heaven Can Wait" is then sung by Raven. "Objects..." is then sung in the Deep End between Jagwire, Valkyrie, and Ledoux.)

After drawing a pint of blood from Raven, Zahara revives her and convinces her to leave together; a hitherto unseen Tink emerges from hiding and destroys Raven's belongings. Zahara takes Raven to a safe area where she and Tink have been secretly looking after Strat, who has miraculously survived. She transfuses Raven's blood into Strat, enabling him to become mobile again, and he stumbles down from the rocks reciting poetry ("Teenager In Love"). Raven is shocked and overjoyed to see Strat and attempts to thank Tink for saving him, but he rebuffs her. Zahara leaves with a reluctant Tink in tow, while Strat and Raven have a heartfelt reunion ("For Crying Out Loud").

The next day, Zahara returns to Falco Towers for Raven's belongings; she is confronted by Falco, who demands that she reveal Raven's location. She denies knowing where Raven is, but Falco reveals that he knows that she is actually one of the Lost. Sloane's attempts to defend Zahara provoke a confrontation in which Falco shoves and almost strikes Sloane, but Zahara fires two warning shots with her gun; Sloane declares that she is ending their marriage, and she leaves with Zahara.

At the museum, Strat once again asks Raven, 'On a hot summer's night, would you offer your throat to the wolf with the red roses?' Raven responds to his words and happily agrees to become his, as the Lost joyously welcome him 'back from the dead' ("You Took the Words Right Out Of My Mouth (Hot Summer Night)"). A mock-wedding is held, where the Lost dress Strat in a ruffled shirt with a sparkly silver jacket, and Raven in a white dress with a bouquet. Sloane accepts Strat as Raven's partner. Raven throws the bouquet over her shoulder - this is caught by Zahara, who is overwhelmed, so she throws it again - where it is caught by a woman of the Lost, who gets down on one knee and proposes to Sloane.

After the 'wedding', Strat and Raven go to the Dunes, where Raven reveals she is now able to dream for the first time, and they attempt to consummate their relationship. They are soon interrupted by a jealous Tink, who urges Strat to send Raven back to Falco. After a heated argument, Tink vows to get rid of Raven and laments his unrequited love for Strat ("Not Allowed to Love"). At Falco Towers, Falco unsuccessfully tries to dissuade Sloane from leaving him, and he is left alone to reflect on his actions ("What Part of My Body Hurts the Most"). He is later visited by Tink, who offers him a deal: he will take him to where Raven is, in exchange that no one gets hurt and that he will leave the Lost alone after he gets Raven back. Falco becomes convinced and he agrees to the deal while amused by Tink's betrayal.

In the Deep End, the Lost celebrate the union between Strat and Raven while Jagwire serenades Zahara ("Dead Ringer For Love"). Their celebration is interrupted when Falco bursts in through the wall with his militia and Tink. He orders the Lost to return Raven to him in exchange for peace. Everyone resists and a scuffle ensues, which abruptly ends when Falco accidentally shoots Tink. Overwhelmed with shock and anger, Strat dismisses Raven, prompting her to flee in heartbreak. Weak from blood loss, Tink apologizes and Strat forgives him, telling him that he will always be his best friend and soulmate. Tink dies in Strat's arms and the Lost hold a funeral for him ("Rock and Roll Dreams Come Through"). Meanwhile, Raven is left with no choice but to return home to Falco Towers, where she furiously blames her father for ruining everything. (In the 2021-2022 and 2025 UK Tours, Tink survives his injuries.)

Six months later, Sloane is wandering through the city, rhapsodizing about her failures to recapture her youth. In Falco Towers, Strat finds Raven, who has been secluding herself in her room. He apologizes for spurning her; they reaffirm their love for one another as Sloane makes her return to Falco ("It's All Coming Back to Me Now"). Raven suddenly has second thoughts about their relationship; she worries about the fact that she will age normally while he stays young forever. Strat tells Raven that she will always be eighteen in his eyes, and he will always love her no matter what.

Strat and Raven, Falco and Sloane, and Zahara and Jagwire vow love and fidelity to their respective partners ("I'd Do Anything For Love (But I Won't Do That)"). Falco is forced at gunpoint into a lake by Zahara, where he emerges several seconds later, in a different outfit to symbolize his baptism and rebirth.

Note: In the 2021-2022 and 2025 UK Tours, Tink comes back for the finale.

== Major characters ==
- Strat: the eccentric and forever eighteen-year-old leader of 'The Lost', a group of teenagers whose DNA froze at eighteen causing them to remain young forever. He falls in love with Falco's daughter, Raven. He and 'The Lost' live in abandoned subway tunnels below the city of Obsidian.
- Raven: Falco's only daughter, who turns eighteen during the course of the story. She lives with her parents in a skyscraper in Obsidian called Falco Towers. She is an heiress to Falco's fortune but resents her family, particularly her father for forbidding her from ever going outside. She falls in love with Strat. However, since her DNA is not frozen, she will age normally.
- Falco: a powerful tyrant and CEO of Falco Industries, and the father of Raven. He has his own private militia, which he often sends out to battle 'The Lost'. He is very protective of Raven to the extent where he forbids her from ever going outside. He particularly despises Strat, seeing him as a threat for wanting to approach his daughter.
- Sloane: Falco's wife and the mother of Raven. She harbours a lot of regret in her life and spends much of the story pushing herself to break free from Falco as he becomes increasingly tyrannical and violent. Projecting her feelings about her own situation towards her daughter, she wants Raven to be free and to be able to fall in love.
- Tink: Strat's best friend and a fellow member of 'The Lost'. He is romantically in love with Strat, but cannot act upon this because his DNA is frozen at a younger developmental age than the rest of 'The Lost' and as such is considered a child by his peers. He resents Raven; the romance between Strat and Raven is interpreted by Tink as Raven taking Strat away from himself and 'The Lost', rather than as Strat taking Raven from her family.
- Zahara: Strat's friend and Jagwire's love interest who leads a double life; working as a nurse at Falco Towers and being part of 'The Lost'. She resents Falco but feels protective towards Raven and Sloane.
- Jagwire: Strat's close friend and second in command of 'The Lost'. Jagwire is suspected to have had history with Zahara, and is still in love with her.
- Ledoux: Strat's friend and a fellow member of 'The Lost' who is a close friend of Tink.
- Blake: Strat's friend and a fellow member of 'The Lost' who is a close friend of Ledoux. For the 2018 North American tour and onward, this character was retired from the show.
- Valkyrie: another member of The Lost - up until the 2018 tour version of the show, she was a background ensemble character closely associated with Blake, but in more recent versions of the show, she has become a more prominent character; flirting with Zahara, singing Blake's verse in "Objects In The Rear View Mirror...", and spontaneously proposing marriage to Sloane during "You Took The Words Right Out Of My Mouth".

== Casts ==
Character	NYC Developmental Lab (2015)	Manchester (2017)	London (2017)	Toronto (2017–18)	London (2018–19)	US Tour (2018–19)	Oberhausen (2018–19)	New York City (2019)	International Tour (2020)	UK Tour (2021)	Las Vegas Residency (2022)	UK & Australian Tour, incl. West End (2023)	UK Tour (2025)	North American Tour (2026)
Strat	Andrew Polec	Andrew Polec	Andrew Polec	Andrew Polec	Andrew Polec	Andrew Polec	Robin Reitsma	Andrew Polec	Glenn Adamson	Glenn Adamson	Travis Cormier	Glenn Adamson	Glenn Adamson	Travis Cormier
Raven	Sheridan Mouawad	Christina Bennington	Christina Bennington	Christina Bennington	Christina Bennington	Emily Schultheis	Sarah Kornfeld	Christina Bennington	Martha Kirby	Martha Kirby	Alize Cruz	Kelly Gnauck	Katie Tonkinson	Carly Burns
Falco	Bradley Dean	Rob Fowler	Rob Fowler	Rob Fowler	Rob Fowler	Bradley Dean	Alex Melcher	Bradley Dean	Alex Melcher (US/Aus)	Rob Fowler (UK)	Travis Cloer	Rob Fowler	Rob Fowler	Travis Cloer
Sloane	Julia Murney / Jackie Burns	Sharon Sexton	Sharon Sexton	Sharon Sexton	Sharon Sexton	Lulu Lloyd	Willemijn Verkaik	Lena Hall	Tamsin Dowsett (US/Aus)	Sharon Sexton (UK) / Franziska Schuster (maternity cover)	Anne Martinez	Sharon Sexton	Sharon Sexton	Tori Kocher
Tink	Charlie Franklin	Aran MacRae	Aran MacRae	Aran MacRae	Alex Thomas-Smith	Avionce Hoyles	Tom van der Ven	Avionce Hoyles	Killian Thomas Lefevre	Killian Thomas Lefevre	Freddy Leakoula Pomee	Matteo Johnson	Carla Bertran	Trevor Groce
Zahara	Christina Sajous	Danielle Steers	Danielle Steers	Danielle Steers	Danielle Steers	Harper Miles	Aisata Blackman	Danielle Steers	Jordan Frazier	Joelle Moses	Mecca Hicks	Jayme-Lee Zanoncelli	Georgia Bradshaw	Tamara Denecia Daly
Jagwire	Billy Lewis Jr	Dom Hartley-Harris	Dom Hartley-Harris	Billy Lewis Jr	Wayne Robinson	Tyrick Wiltez Jones	Benet Monteiro	Tyrick Wiltez Jones	Johnny Bishop	James Chisholm	Je’Shaun Jackson	James Chisholm	Ryan Carter	Kris Bona
Ledoux	Justin Sargent	Giovanni Spanó	Giovanni Spanó	Giovanni Spanó	Giovanni Spanó	Will Branner	Michael Moore	Will Branner	Alex Lodge	Danny Whelan	Jared Svoboda	Danny Whelan	Luke Street	Conor Crowley
Blake	Lance Bordelon	Patrick Sullivan	Patrick Sullivan	Patrick Sullivan	Patrick Sullivan	N/A	Lorenzo Di Girolamo	N/A	N/A	N/A	N/A	N/A	N/A	N/A
Valkyrie	N/A	Georgia Carling	Georgia Carling	Georgia Carling	Georgia Carling	Samantha Pauly	Maureen Mac Gillavry	Jessica Jaunich	Kellie Gnauck	Kellie Gnauck	Mikayla Agrella	Katie Tonkinson	Carly Burns	Paige Anne Mills

=== Major cast replacements ===
==== Dominion Theatre, London (2018–19) ====
- Strat: Jordan Luke Gage took over the role from Andrew Polec on September 4, 2018, after previously covering it as Alternate, while also appearing in the ensemble as Hoffman. Gage was replaced as both Hoffman and as second cover Strat by Barney Wilkinson.
- Ledoux: Giovanni Spanó took a break from the production on September 29, 2018, to compete on the 2018 series of The X Factor, then did not return until December 26 due to suffering from Special Bronchitis. During this time, the role of Ledoux was covered by Sam Toland (1st cover), Eric Hallengren (2nd cover), and Olly Dobson (emergency cover, who previously covered the role as part of the 2017 cast). Toland also played Ledoux for the final performance of this production on the evening of January 5, 2019.

==== Metronom Theater, Oberhausen (2018–19) ====
- Sloane: Franziska Schuster, previously the walk-in-cover for the role took over from Willemijn Verkaik on April 3, 2019.

==== New York City Center (2019) ====
- Ledoux: On July 17, 2019, 15 days before opening, Billy Lewis Jr. announced that he was joining the New York cast as Ledoux. He had previously played the role of Jagwire during various runs in US, UK and Canada. Until August 19, 2019, Will Branner played Ledoux and cover Strat, but Branner left the cast to join the tour of Mean Girls, so Lewis took over the role of Ledoux for the remainder of the run.

== Creative team ==
The Manchester and London productions retained the same creative team.

Creative Team
Role	Name
Book, Music, Lyrics	Jim Steinman
Director	Jay Scheib
Associate Director	Andrea Ferran
Choreographer	Emma Portner
Musical Supervisor	Michael Reed
Orchestration	Steve Sidwell
Musical Director	Robert Emery
Set Design	Jon Bausor
Costumer Design	Meentje Nielsen
Lighting Design	Patrick Woodroffe
Sound Design	Gareth Owen
Video Design	Finn Ross

== Musical numbers ==
Act I

- "Love and Death and an American Guitar" – Strat
- "All Revved Up with No Place to Go" / "Wasted Youth" – Strat, Falco, Ledoux, Jagwire and Company
- "Out of the Frying Pan And Into the Fire" – Strat, Ledoux, Valkyrie, Tink and Company
- "Two Out of Three Ain't Bad" – Zahara and Jagwire
- "Paradise by the Dashboard Light" – Falco, Sloane and Company
- "Making Love Out of Nothing at All" – Strat and Raven
- "Bat Out of Hell" – Strat, Raven and Company

Act II

- "Heaven Can Wait" – Raven
- "Objects in the Rear View Mirror May Appear Closer Than They Are" - Jagwire, Valkyrie, Ledoux and Company
- "For Crying Out Loud" – Strat and Raven
- "You Took the Words Right Out of My Mouth (Hot Summer Night)" – Strat, Raven, Ledoux, Liebeswoosh, Valkyrie, Mordema, Jagwire and Company
- "What Part of My Body Hurts the Most" – Falco and Sloane
- "Dead Ringer for Love" – Jagwire, Zahara and Company
- "Rock and Roll Dreams Come Through" – Strat, Tink, Jagwire, Ledoux, Valkyrie, Zahara and Company
- "It's All Coming Back to Me Now" – Raven, Sloane, Falco and Strat
- "I'd Do Anything for Love (But I Won't Do That)" – Strat, Raven, Jagwire, Falco, Sloane, Zahara, Valkyrie, Ledoux, Liebeswoosh and Company
- "Bat Out of Hell (Reprise / Curtain Call)" – Company

An excerpt from the Meat Loaf recording of "Life Is A Lemon And I Want My Money Back" can be heard at the beginning of the scene in Raven's bedroom between "Who Needs the Young?" and "Out of the Frying Pan (And Into the Fire)". Lines from the title track of the album Bad for Good are used frequently in dialogue spoken by Raven, with one line also being sung as part of Sloane's monologue towards the end of act two.

"Teenager In Love" is the name of the monologue Strat recites immediately before he and Raven sing "For Crying Out Loud". Performed by Steinman, a shorter version of this piece was first released as "Shadows On The Freeway" in 1979, then as "Nocturnal Pleasure" on the 1981 album Dead Ringer. This full length version - titled "Teenager In Love" - was initially only the prologue to the music video for "It's All Coming Back to Me Now" by Pandora's Box (1989) but was later released as a stand-alone audio track on the digital-only special 19-track version of the album, which includes promotional tracks and single edits.

=== Changes ===
- Versions of "Life Is A Lemon And I Want My Money Back" and "Lost Boys and Golden Girls" were rehearsed, but never made it into a staged production.
- "Good Girls Go to Heaven (Bad Girls Go Everywhere)" (sung by Zahara, Sloane, Raven and Company) was included in the first few nights of previews in Manchester, but was cut and replaced with "Out of the Frying Pan (And Into the Fire). However, it was included on the original cast recording, and used as an encore during the 2021 UK tour.
- Following the retirement of the character Blake, the character Valkyrie now sings all of the parts he had. Blake is still heard on the original cast recording.
- "It Just Won't Quit" (sung by Raven, Strat and Company) was in the show until near the end of the London Coliseum run. As with "Good Girls Go to Heaven", it was still included on the original cast recording.
- "In the Land of the Pig, the Butcher Is King" (sung by Falco and Company), and the scene it is included in, were omitted from the US Tour. As of the 2021 UK tour this song has been removed entirely.
- “Love, Death and an American Guitar” was originally performed by Strat. This was later changed to being performed by Raven instead.
- “Who Needs the Young?” (sung by Falco and Sloane) and “Not Allowed to Love” (sung by Tink) were sung in the show until the end of 2022. Neither were performed during the Australian/NZ run in 2023 or at the London Peacock Theatre in 2023.

== Productions ==
=== Manchester ===
Bat Out of Hell began previews at the Manchester Opera House on February 17, 2017, ahead of an official opening on March 14. It closed on April 29.

Dianne Bourne of the Manchester Evening News gave the show a 5-star review, calling it 'a truly staggering piece of musical theatre, which breaks new boundaries in its staging, choreography and concept on an epic scale'. Paul Downham of North West End said, "this show has literally changed the way musicals are staged forever."

=== West End 2017: London Coliseum ===
Bat Out of Hell began previews at the London Coliseum on June 5, 2017, ahead of an official opening on June 20, 2017, and ran until August 22, 2017. On its final performance, the cast announced a return to London at the Dominion Theatre in 2018.

The London Coliseum production was nominated for a 2018 Olivier Award for Best Sound Design, by Gareth Owen.

=== Toronto ===
Bat Out of Hell made its North American premiere at the Ed Mirvish Theatre on October 14, 2017, and ran until January 7, 2018.

=== West End 2018 return: Dominion Theatre ===
After the production completed its run in Toronto, Bat Out Of Hell's return engagement in London began previews on April 2, 2018, before opening at the Dominion Theatre on April 19, 2018. After originally being scheduled to run until July 28, 2018, the Dominion production was first extended until October 27, 2018, and subsequently extended again to January 5, 2019. The show broke box office records at the Dominion, selling £350,000 worth of tickets in its first day of sale.

In August 2018, one of the show's producers David Sonenberg was quoted in Forbes magazine as saying the show was "unbelievably profitable", and that more than 500,000 people had seen the show to that point.

=== North American Tour ===
The North American tour of Bat Out of Hell was originally scheduled to run from October 2018 through Summer 2019. The tour opened October 16, 2018 in Toronto at the Ed Mirvish Theatre, and was first scheduled to end July 7, 2019 in Dallas at the AT&T Performing Arts Center, then - after the Toronto run had begun - further dates were announced in Las Vegas and an 8-week run in New York (off-Broadway) from July 30, 2019, to September 22, 2019.

On November 1, 2018, the North American tour was postponed by producers and concluded with the scheduled end of the Toronto run on November 3, 2018. No reason for the postponing was given, and this decision was criticized by many of the tour's cast, who voiced their displeasure with the news on social media.

On November 5, 2018, an official announcement was made on social media and the show's website to say that the tour will relaunch in 2019, "ahead of a previously announced season at New York City Center." No explanation was given for the postponement. Several cast members contacted prominent theatre news website "BroadwayWorld" to say that their contracts have been terminated and they have not been approached about the 2019 tour.

=== Germany ===
Bat Out Of Hell began previews in Oberhausen at the Metronom Theater on November 2, 2018 ahead of an official opening on November 8, 2018. It closed on September 19, 2019, and was replaced by Tanz Der Vampire in October 2019.

=== New York ===
Bat Out Of Hell made its US debut off-Broadway at the New York City Center theater from August 1, 2019 to September 8, 2019. Tickets went on sale on May 15, 2019, and large billboards were seen on Times Square to promote the show. The cast announced for this run include Andrew Polec, Christina Bennington and Danielle Steers - who originated their characters for the UK productions of the show - and Bradley Dean, Avionce Hoyles, Tyrick Wiltez Jones, Harper Miles and several ensemble actors rejoin the show from the previously aborted 2018 'US Tour'. There were changes to the creative team - Randy Lennox is no longer listed as one of the producers, with Bob Broderick and Lorne Gertner joining the list of producers. Choreography is now credited to both Emma Portner and Xena Gusthart. Ryan Cantwell is named as musical director. On June 4, 2019, they announced Lena Hall for the role of Sloane.

=== Las Vegas ===
A Las Vegas production of the musical was announced in May 2022, with the performances all taking place in the Paris Las Vegas hotel theatre. The production would premiere on September 27, 2022, with Las Vegas entertainment company BASE Entertainment managing the production.

On December 23, 2022, an internal memo was sent to members of the Las Vegas production that the musical would close on January 1, 2023, due to extreme financial troubles. The production was cancelled mid-run into its schedule, with the production only lasting 12 weeks. According to the Las Vegas Review-Journal, the show had seen "chronically low" ticket sales despite being promoted on online-seat filling sites, continuing a streak of productions that had also seen low ticket sales at the Paris Las Vegas hotel. During its production run, the production had seen mixed reviews, with reviews skewing towards negatively-worded reviews. Vital Vegas, a Las Vegas news site, gave a negative review of the musical itself, describing it as a "trainwreck," predicting that the musical production would last only three weeks before shutting down.

=== 2020 international tours ===
==== US Hard Rock Hotels mini-tour ====
The show had been announced for a series of short runs in venues under the Hard Rock Hotels & Casinos group; three US hotels with dates ranging from March to April 2020. It was stated on each press release that this was due to a new partnership between the named hotel and Nederlander Worldwide Entertainment. These shows were all postponed due to the COVID-19 pandemic.

==== Australian arena tour ====
On November 25, 2019, announcements were made of an Arena Tour version of the show for June 2020, stopping at Sydney, Brisbane, Melbourne, Adelaide, and Perth. The production has been re-branded as Jim Steinman's Bat Out Of Hell: The Rock Musical and an 'Arena Experience'. Venues and promotion are being run by Australian entertainment company TEG Dainty with the long-time promoter and company CEO Paul Dainty being quoted on press releases. These shows were initially postponed until May 2021, and later postponed again until January/February 2023. The production also had plans to tour New Zealand, but plans were later cancelled due to the COVID-19 pandemic.

==== UK 2021/22 tour ====
On December 5, 2019, a UK tour in Q3-Q4 2020 and 2021 was announced to open in Manchester on 10 September 2020 but was rescheduled due to the COVID-19 pandemic. On 21 June 2021, producers confirmed the new tour dates from September 2021. The show opened at the Manchester Opera House on 11 September 2021 before visiting Oxford, Glasgow, Birmingham, Wimbledon, Stockton, Edinburgh, Aberdeen, Stoke-on-Trent, Sheffield, Eastbourne, Milton Keynes, Southampton, Plymouth, Newcastle, Bristol, Belfast, Dublin, Hull, Cardiff, Liverpool and Woking.

The cast for US / Australia / UK 2020 was revealed on 27 February 2020, simultaneously on WhatsOnStage.com and on the official website. Returning cast were Rob Fowler and Sharon Sexton as Falco and Sloane in the UK tour, and Alex Melcher as Falco in the US and Australia. Glenn Adamson would play Strat in the US and UK, and Martha Kirby would be playing Raven in all territories. As with the North American tour and NYCC versions of the show, no one is listed in the role of Blake. There were then only 10 members of the ensemble cast - to compare, there were 26 members of the ensemble cast for the show's West End run at the Dominion Theatre.

==== UK 2025 tour ====
The show returned to the Peacock theatre in May 2025 before moving on to other theatres across the UK.

Glenn Adamson reprised the role of Strat, with Rob Fowler returning as Falco and Sharon Sexton as Sloane. Katie Tonkinson took on the role of Raven.

== Awards and nominations ==
Year	Award	Category	Nominee	Result
2017	Evening Standard Theatre Award	Best Musical		Won
2017	Evening Standard Theatre Award	Best Design	Jon Bausor	Nominated
2017	BroadwayWorld UK Award	Best Actor in a New Production of a Musical	Andrew Polec	Nominated
2017	BroadwayWorld UK Award	Best Actress in a New Production of a Musical	Christina Bennington	Nominated
2017	BroadwayWorld UK Award	Best Sound Design of a New Production of a Play or Musical	Gareth Owen	Won
2017	BroadwayWorld UK Award	Best New Production of a Musical		Nominated
2017	The Stage Debut Award	The Joe Allen Best West End Debut Award	Andrew Polec	Won
2017	West End Wilma Award	Rising Star	Andrew Polec	Nominated
2018	Laurence Olivier Award	Best Sound Design	Gareth Owen	Nominated
2018	AV Technology Europe Award	Best Use Of Audio Solutions	Gareth Owen	Won
2018	WhatsOnStage Award	Best Actor in a Musical	Andrew Polec	Nominated
2018	WhatsOnStage Award	Best Actress in a Musical	Christina Bennington	Nominated
2018	WhatsOnStage Award	Best Supporting Actor in a Musical	Rob Fowler	Nominated
2018	WhatsOnStage Award	Best Supporting Actress in a Musical	Danielle Steers	Nominated
2018	WhatsOnStage Award	Best New Musical		Nominated
2018	WhatsOnStage Award	Best Direction	Jay Scheib	Nominated
2018	WhatsOnStage Award	Best Set Design	Jon Bausor	Nominated
2018	WhatsOnStage Award	Best Lighting Design	Patrick Woodroffe	Won
2018	West End Wilma Award	Best West End Show		Nominated
2018	West End Wilma Award	Best Performer In A West End Show	Sharon Sexton	Won
2018	West End Wilma Award	Best Supporting Cast Member in a West End Show	Danielle Steers	Won
2018	West End Wilma Award	Best Understudy	Rhianne-Louise McCaulsky	Nominated
2019	WhatsOnStage Award	Best Original Cast Recording		Nominated
2019	WhatsOnStage Award	Best West End Show		Nominated

== See also ==
- & Juliet - jukebox musical with book by David West Read based on a loose retelling of Romeo and Juliet that features the songs of songwriter Max Martin.
