= Laila Zaidi =

English actress (born 1993)

- Born: October 1993 (age 32–33); King's Lynn, Norfolk, England
- Education: ArtsEd
- Years active: 2016–present
- Spouse: Adam Gillen (m. 2026)

Laila Zaidi (born October 1993) is a British actress. On television, she is known for her roles in the tenth series of Benidorm (2018) on ITV, the fifth series of the Channel 4 comedy-drama Ackley Bridge (2022) and for her role as Maria Jaziri on the BBC soap opera Doctors (2024).

== Early life ==
Zaidi was born in King's Lynn, Norfolk to a Pakistani father from Karachi and an English-Welsh mother, and grew up in Washington, Tyne and Wear. She has an older brother and a younger sister. Zaidi attended Newcastle High School for Girls. She went on to graduate in 2016 from the Arts Educational School (ArtsEd) in West London with a Bachelor of Arts (BA).

== Career ==
Upon graduating from ArtsEd in 2016, Zaidi made her professional stage debut starring as Maria in the Kilworth House production of West Side Story. She also appeared in The Season Ticket at the Northern Stage. In 2017, she workshopped Andrew Lloyd Webber's Starlight Express at The Other Palace in London and made her television debut with a guest appearance in an episode of the BBC medical soap Doctors.

In 2018, Zaidi joined the cast of the long-running ITV sitcom Benidorm for its tenth series as Cyd. She took part in the original cast of the folk opera The Selfish Giant, which premiered at the Royal & Derngate in Northampton and then had a run at London's Vaudeville Theatre for the venue's Oscar Wilde season, marking Zaidi's West End debut. In 2019, she starred as Jess Bhamra in the Canadian production and North American premiere of Bend It Like Beckham: The Musical at the St. Lawrence Centre for the Arts in Toronto.

Zaidi joined the main cast of the Channel 4 school-set comedy drama Ackley Bridge for its fifth and final series as the teacher Asma Farooqi, which aired in 2022. In 2023, she appeared in the Live Theatre production of Three Acts of Love in Newcastle. She then went on the Rifco tour of Frankie Goes to Bollywood as the titular character. In 2024, she appeared in the BBC soap opera Doctors as Maria Jaziri.

== Personal life ==
In 2023, Zaidi became engaged to fellow Benidorm star Adam Gillen; their relationship had been initially reported on in 2018. The couple married at Hackney Town Hall in February 2026 and then had a second celebration in Seville in April.

== Filmography ==
Year	Title	Role	Notes
2017	Doctors	Samika Ramaswamy	1 episode
2018	Benidorm	Cyd	Main role
2018	Amigo de Aluguel	Hannah	1 episode
2020	Hayley Alien	Artist	Short film
2020	Holby City	Christie O'Connor	1 episode
2021	The Everlasting Club		Short film
2022	Mood	Zara	1 episode
2022	Ackley Bridge	Asma Farooqi	Main role
2024	Doctors	Maria Jaziri	Recurring role
TBA	Dog Days	Hope	

== Stage ==
Year	Title	Role	Notes
2016	West Side Story	Maria	Kilworth House, Leicestershire
2016	The Season Ticket	Clare / Gemma	Northern Stage, Newcastle
2017	Starlight Express	Tassita	The Other Palace, London
2018	The Selfish Giant	Charlie / Hail	Royal & Derngate, Northampton / Vaudeville Theatre, London
2019	The Boy Friend	Polly Browne	Menier Chocolate Factory, London / Princess of Wales Theatre, Toronto
2019	Bend It Like Beckham: The Musical	Jasminder "Jess" Bhamra	St. Lawrence Centre for the Arts, Toronto
2023	Three Acts of Love	Clara	Live Theatre, Newcastle
2024	Frankie Goes to Bollywood	Frankie	UK tour
