= Naomi Wakszlak =

English actress (born 1998)

- Born: 19 November 1998 (age 27); Hither Green, Lewisham, London, England
- Other name: Naomi Morris
- Occupation: Actress
- Years active: 2013–present
- Television: Doctors; Casualty
- Children: 1

Naomi Chaya Wakszlak (Polish pronunciation: [neɪˈəʊmi ˈvakʂlak]; born 19 November 1998) is an English actress. She made her acting debut on stage with the National Youth Music Theatre, appearing in productions including The Hired Man and Spring Awakening. Wakszlak, who was originally credited as Naomi Morris, then began appearing in screen productions including the BBC soap opera Doctors and the 2018 film Above the Clouds, which she won two accolades for. Since 2024, she has appeared on the BBC medical drama series Casualty as Indie Jankowski.

== Life and career ==
Wakszlak is of Ashkenazi Jewish descent. She attended Thomas Tallis School in Kidbrooke, whilst attending weekend classes at stage school D&B Academy of Performing Arts. She grew up in Hither Green and was a member of a choir at Greenwich Academy of Music and Drama. At the beginning of her acting career, she was credited as Naomi Morris. Wakszlak made her first professional acting appearance in the National Youth Music Theatre's 2013 stage production of The Other School. A year later, she played a lead role in The Hired Man at St James's Theatre. Wakszlak then appeared in a television advertisement for Cadbury's Twirl bars, as well as an advertisement for Harveys Furniture. In 2015, she starred in the Lighthouse's production of Peter Pan as Wendy Darling. Also in 2015, she appeared in an episode of the BBC daytime soap opera Doctors as Ava Adams.

In 2017, Wakszlak played a lead role in a touring production of Wonderland. Her performance was received well by WhatsOnStage, who billed her as the "overall finest" of the production. In 2018, Wakszlak played Charlie Finch in the film Above the Clouds. Her portrayal was praised by the Raindance Film Festival. She went on to win Best Actress at the Oxford International Film Festival, as well as Best Actress at the Port Townsend Film Festival. In 2019, she appeared in an episode of the Epix series Pennyworth. In 2020, she returned to stage, appearing in a production of Malory Towers. 2021 saw her appear as Daphne The Christmas Goblin at the Marlowe Theatre, as well as return to Doctors, this time in the role of Rosie Snell. Then in 2024, she appeared in an episode of the Paramount+ crime drama series Sexy Beast as Young Deedee, a younger version of Sarah Greene's character. Later that year, Wakszlak was cast in the BBC medical drama series Casualty. She made her first appearance as Indie Jankowski, the show's first student paramedic, in December 2024.

== Stage ==
Year	Title	Role	Venue
2013	The Other School	Michela	National Youth Music Theatre
2014	The Hired Man	May Talentire	National Youth Music Theatre
2015	Peter Pan	Wendy Darling	Lighthouse
2017	Wonderland	Chloe	UK tour
2016	Spring Awakening	Drummer and Percussionist	National Youth Music Theatre
2020	Malory Towers	Mary-Lou Atkinson	Theatre by the Lake
2021	The Christmas Goblin	Daphne	Marlowe Theatre

== Filmography ==
Year	Title	Role	Notes
2015	Grace	Grace	Short film
2015	Doctors	Ava Adams	Episode: "House of Hammered Horrors"
2016	Shards	Maeve	Short film
2017	Back	Janette	Guest role
2018	Above the Clouds	Charlie Finch	Film
2019	Pennyworth	Nervous Girl	Episode: "Lady Penelope"
2021	Doctors	Rosie Snell	Episode: "Impostor"
2024	Sexy Beast	Young Deedee	Episode: "Trouble is Real"
2024	That Night	Zara	Short film
2024–present	Casualty	Indie Jankowski	Main role

== Awards and nominations ==
Year	Ceremony	Category	Nominated work	Result	Ref.
2019	Oxford International Film Festival	Best Actress	Above the Clouds	Won	
2019	Port Townsend Film Festival	Best Actress	Above the Clouds	Won	
