= Danielle Steers =

English stage actress and singer-songwriter

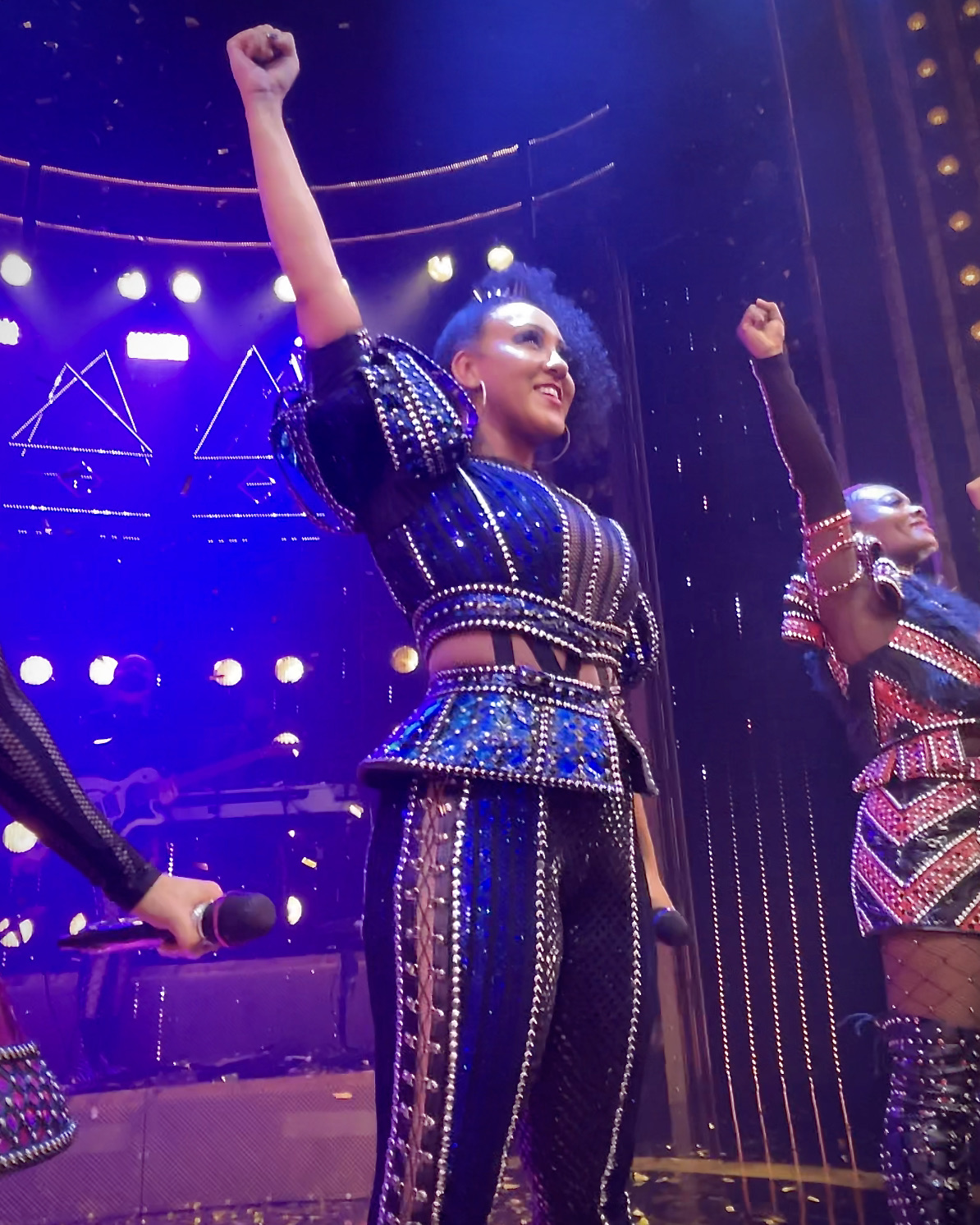
- Steers performing as Catherine Parr in Six in November 2021 at the Vaudeville Theatre
- Born: Danielle Lauren Steers; 20 June 1991 (age 35); Barnsley, Yorkshire, England
- Occupations: Actress; singer; songwriter
- Years active: 2009–present
- Height: 170 cm (5 ft 7 in)
- Partner: Stephen Webb (2020-present)
- Children: 1

Danielle Lauren Steers (born 20 June 1991) is an English stage actress and singer-songwriter. She is known for originating the role of Zahara in Bat Out of Hell: The Musical at the Manchester Opera House, as well as subsequently playing the role in various productions (including in the West End and Off-Broadway productions) until 2019. She is also known for portraying Catherine Parr in Six at the Arts Theatre, Lyric Theatre and Vaudeville Theatre and portraying Lady in the 2022-23 UK Tour of The Cher Show. Her debut album The Future Ain't What It Used To Be was released in 2021.

== Early life ==
Steers was born and raised in Barnsley, Yorkshire and attended Darton High School until she graduated in 2007. Steers then started training at SLP College in 2007 for three years until she graduated on 3 July 2010. Steers has openly spoken about her broad range of allergic reactions that have affected her since her early life, which include allergic rhinitis and allergies to dust mites, white wine and cats. She is also lactose intolerant.

== Career ==
Whilst training at SLP College, Steers performed in the play Snoopy at the SLP College Studio Theatre, as well as That's Entertainment at the Bradford Alhambra Theatre, Caberet at The Met Hotel in Leeds and Hey Mr. Composer at the Grand Opera House York. As a singer-songwriter, she released a single titled "Taking Back My Life" in 2019 as part of her album "The Future Ain't What It Used To Be", which was originally scheduled to be released alongside her solo concert on 2 March 2020 at the Arts Theatre, although the concert has since been postponed until further notice due to the COVID-19 pandemic. Steers was also a backing singer for Sheila Ferguson on BBC Radio 2's Wake Up to Wogan. She is currently a client of Shepherd Management.

Steers appeared in the originally staged West End production of Six at the Arts Theatre (before it transferred to the new production at the Lyric Theatre) alongside principal cast colleagues Jarnéia Richard-Noel, Courtney Bowman, Natalie Paris, Alexia McIntosh and Sophie Isaacs. Steers was also due to feature in a Live Drive-In UK Tour of Six presented by Utilita Energy, in association with Live Nation. The performances were due to take place in compliance with the HM Government's COVID-19 social distancing measures at various venues across the UK. However, promoters Live Nation announced the cancellation of the tour due to fears over potential localised lockdowns in response to the ongoing coronavirus pandemic.

Steers also launched 'Six Scents', an artisan candle company in collaboration with business partner Maddison Firth in July 2020 that produces a wide range of scents inspired by the musical Six. She performed in several socially distanced concerts in 2020, including two drive-in collaborative concerts at 'The Drive In' located within the London Borough of Enfield, a tribute concert to the Spice Girls at both the Turbine Theatre within Battersea Power Station and 'The Drive In' located within the London Borough of Enfield. Steers then appeared in Six at the Lyric Theatre, it was one of the first musicals to return to the West End after the COVID-19 pandemic. From late September 2021 the show moved to the nearby Vaudeville Theatre and Steers was part of the cast until her final performance as Catherine Parr on 14 November 2021.

In January 2021, Steers released her debut album titled "The Future Ain't What It Used To Be", recorded in the summer of 2019. The album comprises 9 songs, all composed by songwriter Jim Steinman, she cites her production of the album to fans of Bat Out of Hell: The Musical for being "incredibly supportive", the album was arranged by Noam Galperin.

Steers joined the cast of the UK tour of The Cher Show in 2022 as Lady. Fellow castmates included Millie O'Connell as Babe and Debbie Kurup as Star. The tour covered the UK and Ireland and finished in spring 2023. In May 2023, WhatsOnStage exclusively unveiled Steers as the final cast member of new Weimar-era Berlin musical Fury and Elysium, the production ran for two weeks in June 2023 at The Other Palace.

Following the birth of her child, Steers originated the role of Marsha in the jukebox musical Just For One Day at The Old Vic, based on the events leading up to Live Aid, the 1985 benefit concert organized by Bob Geldof and Midge Ure to raise awareness and funds for the famine in Ethiopia. She subsequently features on the original cast recording released in 2025 to coincide with the production at the Shaftesbury Theatre. That same year she starred in another jukebox musical A Night With Janis Joplin which played a limited run at the Peacock Theatre in Summer 2024, this same production was filmed and released in cinemas across the UK in Spring 2025. In early June 2025, Steers appeared at the Southwark Playhouse in a production of the Stephen Sondheim musical The Frogs, portraying the role of Pluto for one week (2-7 June).

In early May 2025, Steers was announced to star in new musical Hot Mess alongside Tobias Turley, the production "reimagines the climate crisis as a story between two central characters: Earth and Humanity". Following previews at the Birmingham Hippodrome, the show played at The Pleasance during the Edinburgh Festival Fringe, and Southwark Playhouse Elephant from mid October to early November 2025. The production is currently running at The Other Palace this time alongside Morgan Gregory.

=== Theatre credits ===
Year	Production	Role	Venue	Ref
2011	Respect La Diva	Devine	Garrick Theatre	
2011–2012	Legally Blonde	Judge / Saleswoman / Cover Pilar	Savoy Theatre	
2012	Hairspray	Dynamite	Aberystwyth Arts Centre	
2012	Jack & The Beanstalk	Fairy	The Academy Theatre, Barnsley	
2013	We Will Rock You	Ensemble / Cover Killer Queen	European Tour	
2014	The Bodyguard	Swing / Cover Nicki Marron	Adelphi Theatre	
2015–2016	Beautiful: The Carole King Musical	Lucille / Shirelle / 'One Fine Day' Backup Singer	Aldwych Theatre	
2017–2019	Bat Out of Hell: The Musical	Zahara	London Coliseum / Ed Mirvish Theatre / Dominion Theatre / New York City Center	
2019	Sweet Charity	Carmen	Donmar Warehouse	
2019–2021	Six	Catherine Parr	Arts Theatre / Lyric Theatre / Vaudeville Theatre	
2020	First Date	Woman No. 1	Crazy Coqs, Soho	
2021	In Pieces	River	KidZania at Westfield London	
2021-2022	Aladdin	The Supreme Leader of Jannerstown	Theatre Royal Plymouth	
2022-2023	The Cher Show	Lady	UK Tour	
2023	Fury and Elysium	Kitty Shmidt/The Madam	The Other Palace	
2024	Just for One Day	Marsha	The Old Vic	
2024	A Night With Janis Joplin	Joplinaire	Peacock Theatre	
2025	The Frogs	Pluto	Southwark Playhouse	
2025-2026	Hot Mess	Earth	Birmingham Hippodrome / Edinburgh Fringe / Southwark Playhouse Elephant / The Other Palace	

== Personal life ==
Steers currently resides in London. She cites Shirley Bassey as one of her greatest inspirations when she was younger, and the main persona that sparked her future endeavour to become an actress and singer-songwriter. In July 2021, Steers underwent surgery to correct a deviated septum, a condition in which the nasal septum is significantly off-centre, making breathing difficult and uncomfortable, this consequently meant she had to miss performances of Six from 29 June to 1 August 2021. During her absence the role of Catherine Parr was portrayed by Athena Collins.

Steers is currently engaged to fellow West End actor Stephen Webb, and announced the birth of their first child, Alfie, in October 2023.

== Discography ==
Year	Title	Artist	Album	Notes
2018	"Rule The World"	Alexis Gerred featuring Danielle Steers	Alexis	Featured Vocal
2019	"Taking Back My Life"	Danielle Steers	Non-album Single	Singer-Songwriter
2019	"Two Out of Three Ain't Bad"	Danielle Steers	Acoustic Version	Singer
2019	"The Future Ain't What It Used To Be"	Danielle Steers	The Future Ain't What It Used To Be	Singer
2021	"Rock and Roll Dreams Come Through"	Danielle Steers	The Future Ain't What It Used To Be	Singer
2021	"Lost Boys and Golden Girls"	Danielle Steers	The Future Ain't What It Used To Be	Singer
2021	"Safe Sex"	Danielle Steers	The Future Ain't What It Used To Be	Singer
2021	"Surfs Up"	Danielle Steers	The Future Ain't What It Used To Be	Singer
2021	"Total Eclipse of the Heart"	Danielle Steers featuring Simon Gordon	The Future Ain't What It Used To Be	Singer
2021	"Holding Out for a Hero"	Danielle Steers featuring Lauren Drew	The Future Ain't What It Used To Be	Singer
2021	"Bad For Good"	Danielle Steers	The Future Ain't What It Used To Be	Singer

=== As featured artist ===
Year	Title	Album
2017	"Good Girls Go to Heaven (Bad Girls Go Everywhere)" with The Cast of Bat Out of Hell: The Musical	Bat Out of Hell: The Musical (Original Cast Recording)
2017	"Two Out Of Three Ain't Bad" with Dom Hartley-Harris and The Cast of Bat Out of Hell: The Musical	Bat Out of Hell: The Musical (Original Cast Recording)
2017	"Dead Ringer For Love" with The Cast of Bat Out of Hell: The Musical	Bat Out of Hell: The Musical (Original Cast Recording)
2017	"I'd Do Anything For Love (But I Won't Do That)" with The Cast of Bat Out of Hell: The Musical	Bat Out of Hell: The Musical (Original Cast Recording)
2025	"Dancing In The Street" with The Cast of Just For One Day	Just For One Day (Original Cast Recording)
