= Izuka Hoyle =

Scottish actress (born 1996)

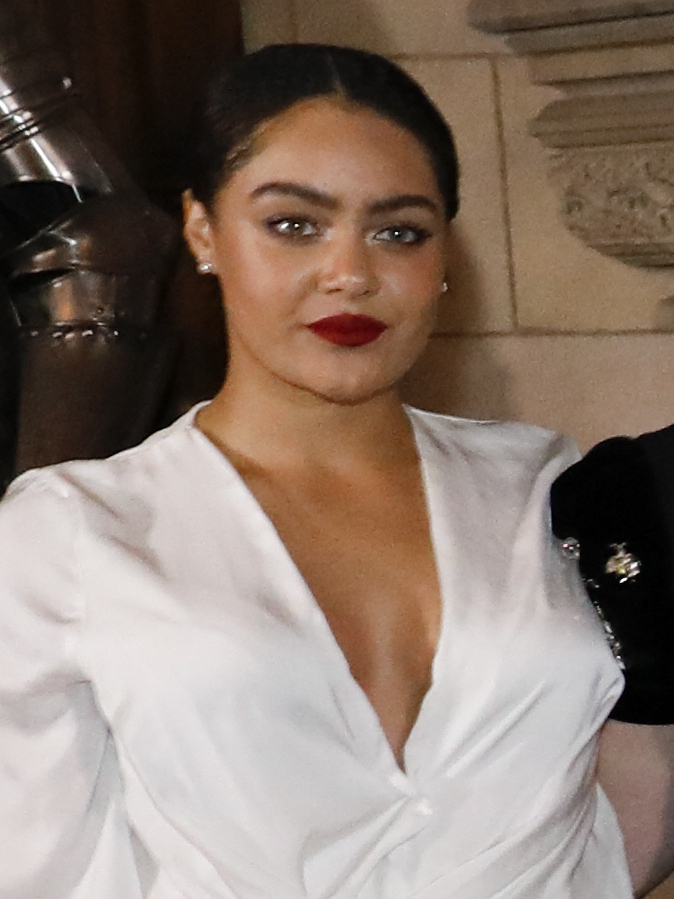
- Hoyle at the Mary Queen of Scots premiere in 2019
- Born: Chantelle Izuka Hoyle; 18 January 1996 (age 30); Edinburgh, Scotland
- Education: ArtsEd
- Occupation: Actress
- Years active: 2017–present

Chantelle Izuka Hoyle (born 18 January 1996) is a Scottish actress. She began her career in theatre. Hoyle won a Scottish BAFTA for her performance in the film Boiling Point (2021). On television, she is known for her roles in the Channel 4 sitcom Big Boys (2022–2025) and the BBC adaptation of Boiling Point (2023).

She was named a 2025 Screen International Star of Tomorrow.

== Early life ==
Hoyle was born in Edinburgh and spent her early childhood in Dundee. Her sister Kimberly also acts and sings. Their father grew up in Edinburgh and has family from England; their Nigerian-born mother arrived in the UK when she was a teenager. She attended Cramond Primary School and then the Royal High School. Hoyle left mainstream education at 16 before moving to London; while in London, she was awarded a scholarship to train at ArtsEd, graduating in 2017.

== Career ==
Hoyle originated the role of Catherine Parr in the 2017 production of Six: the Musical. The following year, she made her film debut as Mary Seton in the historical drama Mary Queen of Scots and her television debut in the second series of Clique. She also appeared in theatrical productions of The Selfish Giant and Sylvia. She then starred as Darrell Rivers on the UK tour of the musical adaptation of Malory Towers.

Hoyle joined the cast of the CW series The Outpost for its third and fourth seasons as Wren and had a small role as Dana in the Amazon Prime adaptation of The Wheel of Time. She has appeared in the films Villain (2020), Boiling Point (2021) (which earned her a Scottish BAFTA), and Persuasion (2022).

In 2023, Hoyle reprised her role as Camille in the BBC television adaptation of Boiling Point.

As of 2025, Hoyle stars as Corinne in the Channel 4 sitcom Big Boys, and has an upcoming lead role in the upcoming Sky series Prisoner.

== Filmography ==
Key
†	Denotes projects that have not yet been released

=== Film ===
Year	Title	Role	Notes	Ref.
2018	Mary Queen of Scots	Mary Seton		
2019	Forget You		Musical short	
2020	Villain	Chloe Franks		
2021	I Am	Lea	Short film	
2021	Boiling Point	Camille		
2022	Persuasion	Henrietta Musgrove		
2023	The After	Emily	Short film	
2024	The Outrun	Gloria		
TBA	Beach Boys †	TBA	Upcoming film	

=== Television ===
Year	Title	Role	Notes	Ref.
2018	Clique	Dani	Series regular; 6 episodes	
2019	Jerk	Clara	Recurring role; 4 episodes	
2020	Deadwater Fell	Josephine Humphrey	Miniseries; 1 episode	
2020–2021	The Outpost	Wren	Series regular; 26 episodes	
2021	Float	Angie	Series 1; episode 6	
2021	The Wheel of Time	Dana	Recurring role; 2 episodes	
2022–2025	Big Boys	Corinne	Series regular; 17 episodes	
2023	Boiling Point	Camille	Miniseries; 4 episodes	
2024	The Responder	Lorna	Recurring role; 5 episodes	
2024	Dinner with the Parents	Jenny Spiegel	Recurring role; 6 episodes	
2024	Ludwig	DS Alice Finch	Series regular; 6 episodes	
2026	Prisoner	Amber Todd	Series 6 episodes	

== Stage ==
Year	Title	Role	Notes
2017	Working	Selena	Southwark Playhouse, London
2017	Six: the Musical	Catherine Parr	Arts Theatre, London
2018	The Selfish Giant	Girl / Narrator	Royal & Derngate, Northampton / Vaudeville Theatre, London
2018	Sylvia	Emily Davison	Old Vic Theatre, London
2019	Malory Towers	Darrell Rivers	UK tour

== Awards and nominations ==
Year	Award	Category	Work	Result	Ref.
2022	British Academy Scotland Awards	Actress – Film	Boiling Point	Won	
