= Malory Towers (musical) =

- Music: Ian Ross
- Book: Emma Rice
- Basis: Malory Towers by Enid Blyton
- Premiere: 19 July 2019: The Passenger Shed, Bristol
- Productions: 2019 UK tour 2020 UK tour 2020 London

Malory Towers is a musical based on the series of books of the same name by Enid Blyton. It is adapted by Emma Rice and composed by Ian Ross.

== Production ==
The musical is the second production from Emma Rice's theatre company Wise Children. It opened at The Passenger Shed in Bristol from 19 July to 18 August 2019 before touring to Cambridge Arts Theatre (4 to 7 September), York Theatre Royal (10 to 14 September), Exeter Northcott Theatre (17 to 21 September), HOME Manchester (24 to 28 September) and Oxford Playhouse (1 to 5 October).

The production was scheduled to begin a UK tour in spring 2020, however this has had to be postponed due to the COVID-19 pandemic. The tour was also scheduled to run at the Southbank Centre, London from 2 July to 31 August 2020.

== Cast and characters ==
Character	2019 UK tour	2020 UK tour and London
Gwendoline Lacey	Rebecca Collingwood	Alison Arnopp
Irene Dupont	Mirabelle Gremaud	Mirabelle Gremaud
Bill Robinson	Vinnie Heaven	Georgia Bruce
Darrell Rivers	Izuka Hoyle	Alice Vilanculo
Alicia Johns	Renee Lamb	Bobbie Little
Sally Hope	Francesca Mills	Rosie Abraham
Mary Lou Atkinson	Rose Shalloo	Naomi Morris
