= Andrew Polec =

American actor (born 1989)

- Born: January 28, 1989 (age 37); Philadelphia, Pennsylvania, U.S.
- Genres: Musical theatre, Rock music
- Occupations: actor; singer; theatre performer
- Website: www.andrewpolec.com

Andrew Polec (born 28 January 1989) is an actor on both stage and TV, singer and songwriter, best known for originating the role of Strat in Jim Steinman's Bat Out Of Hell: The Musical from 2016 to 2019, right from the show's workshop through performing in the UK and North America. He is the son of 6ABC reporter Don Polec.

== Career ==
=== Theatre ===
Year	Show	Role	Theatre	Location
2016	The Fantasticks	Matt	The Theater Center	Off-Broadway
2017	Bat Out of Hell: The Musical	Strat	Manchester Opera House	Manchester
2017	Bat Out of Hell: The Musical	Strat	London Coliseum	West End
2017-18	Bat Out of Hell: The Musical	Strat	Ed Mirvish Theatre	Toronto
2018	Bat Out of Hell: The Musical	Strat	Dominion Theatre	West End
2018	Bat Out of Hell: The Musical	Strat	Ed Mirvish Theatre	Toronto
2019	Bat Out of Hell: The Musical	Strat	New York City Center	New York
2019	The Dream Engine	Baal	Kirby Theater	Amherst College
2021	Hair	Berger	The Old Globe	San Diego
2021	Dr. Seuss' How the Grinch Stole Christmas! The Musical	Grinch	The Old Globe	San Diego

Note: In 2018, Polec left the London West End cast of the show, only to join the International Touring Cast of the same show. The 2018 Toronto run was originally intended as a tour of North America, but this tour was halted by the show's producers after the first venue.

=== Discography ===
Polec's recording debut was as a member of the University of Rochester's a cappella ensemble - the Midnight Ramblers - on their album Ben Folds Presents: University A Cappella!, in 2009. In 2012, he released the album Welcome to Khat House as the lead singer of the band Khat House. The cast recording for Bat Out Of Hell: The Musical, released in 2017, features several songs which he sings in his lead role as Strat. He appears on the season 1 soundtrack of the Katy Keene TV series, alongside Ashleigh Murray, singing City Of Lights.

=== Television ===
In 2017 - 2018, Polec performed on various TV shows with the cast of Bat Out Of Hell The Musical, including Tonight at the London Palladium, Britain's Got Talent and This Morning in the UK, and the Today show in the US.

In 2020 - 2021, he acted in two US TV dramas; Katy Keene and Prodigal Son.

== Awards and nominations ==
Polec won "Best West End Debut" at the inaugural Stage Debut Awards in 2017 for his role as Strat in Bat Out Of Hell The Musical. For this same role, he was also nominated WhatsOnStage Award for Best Actor In A Musical in 2018, shortlisted for Best Actor in a New Production of a Musical in the BroadwayWorld UK Awards, and nominated "Rising Star" in the 2017 West End Wilma Awards.

Polec won the Kurt Weill Foundation for Music's 23rd Annual Lotte Lenya Competition in 2021.
