= We Will Rock You: 10th Anniversary Tour =

2013–14 musical concert tour

- Tour by We Will Rock You
- Location: Europe, North America
- Start date: 25 February 2013
- End date: 24 August 2014
- Legs: 2
- No. of shows: 404 in Total; 279 in the United States; 22 in Denmark; 18 in Canada; 16 in England; 15 in Mexico; 15 in Turkey; 8 in Finland; 8 in Luxembourg; 6 in Bulgaria; 5 in the Czech Republic; 5 in Northern Ireland; 4 in Ireland; 3 in the Netherlands; 16 Cancelled

The We Will Rock You: 10th Anniversary Tour is world tour started in February 2013, by the We Will Rock You Musical celebrating the musical's tenth anniversary. Although the tour will technically take place between the musical's eleventh and twelfth anniversaries. The tour will play to audiences around the world while the record-breaking run at London's Dominion Theatre will continue.

== Background ==
Following the 2010 and 2011 UK theatre tours, the Queen and Ben Elton musical, We Will Rock You announces the show will embark on its first ever world arena tour. With a multitude of Queen songs delivered in show.

Unprecedented success in theatres around the world has paved the way for We Will Rock You to make the step into arenas, where the Rock Theatrical will be performed in front of thousands of rock fans every night. The world tour will see the show visit arenas in Finland, Denmark, the Netherlands, Luxembourg, Czech Republic, Turkey, Bulgaria, Croatia and the UK and Ireland in 2013. Further dates in Japan, South Africa, New Zealand and Australia will be announced shortly. Due to the Leeds Arena not being completed on time, it will not be a playable venue by the time of the shows. All shows originally scheduled for Newcastle's Metro Radio Arena we moved to the dates of the original Leeds shows, which have been indefinitely postponed until the dates can be rescheduled.

On 7 March 2013, QueenOnline announced that there will also be a national tour of the United States, beginning in Baltimore in October and currently will visit Chicago, Pittsburgh, Boston, Minneapolis, Thunder Bay, Miami, For Myers, Columbus, Houston, Detroit, Providence, Tampa, Charlotte, Des Moines, and Los Angeles

== Tour dates ==
Date	City	Country	Venue	Times
Europe
25 February 2013	Turku	Finland	HK Arena	7:30pm
26 February 2013	Turku	Finland	HK Arena	7:30pm
28 February 2013	Helsinki	Finland	Hartwall Areena	7:30pm
1 March 2013	Helsinki	Finland	Hartwall Areena	7:30pm
2 March 2013	Helsinki	Finland	Hartwall Areena	1:00pm & 5:00pm
3 March 2013	Helsinki	Finland	Hartwall Areena	3:00pm & 7:30pm
7 March 2013	Aalborg	Denmark	Gigantium	8:00pm
8 March 2013	Aalborg	Denmark	Gigantium	4:30pm & 9:00pm
9 March 2013	Aalborg	Denmark	Gigantium	3:30pm & 8:00pm
10 March 2013	Aalborg	Denmark	Gigantium	3:00pm
12 March 2013	Copenhagen	Denmark	Forum Copenhagen	8:00pm
13 March 2013	Copenhagen	Denmark	Forum Copenhagen	8:00pm
14 March 2013	Copenhagen	Denmark	Forum Copenhagen	8:00pm
15 March 2013	Copenhagen	Denmark	Forum Copenhagen	4:30pm & 9:00pm
16 March 2013	Copenhagen	Denmark	Forum Copenhagen	3:30pm & 8:00pm
17 March 2013	Copenhagen	Denmark	Forum Copenhagen	3:00pm
19 March 2013	Horsens	Denmark	Forum Horsens	8:00pm
20 March 2013	Horsens	Denmark	Forum Horsens	8:00pm
21 March 2013	Horsens	Denmark	Forum Horsens	8:00pm
22 March 2013	Horsens	Denmark	Forum Horsens	4:30pm & 9:00pm
23 March 2013	Horsens	Denmark	Forum Horsens	3:30pm & 8:00pm
24 March 2013	Horsens	Denmark	Forum Horsens	3:00pm
27 March 2013	Nottingham	England	Capital FM Arena	7:30pm
28 March 2013	Nottingham	England	Capital FM Arena	7:30pm
29 March 2013	Nottingham	England	Capital FM Arena	7:30pm
30 March 2013	Nottingham	England	Capital FM Arena	2:30pm & 7:30pm
4 April 2013	Dublin	Ireland	The O_{2}	7:30pm
5 April 2013	Dublin	Ireland	The O_{2}	7:30pm
6 April 2013	Dublin	Ireland	The O_{2}	2:30pm & 7:30pm
11 April 2013	Amsterdam	Netherlands	Heineken Music Hall	8:00pm
12 April 2013	Amsterdam	Netherlands	Heineken Music Hall	8:00pm
13 April 2013	Amsterdam	Netherlands	Heineken Music Hall	8:00pm
16 April 2013	Esch-sur-Alzette	Luxembourg	Rockhal	8:00pm
17 April 2013	Esch-sur-Alzette	Luxembourg	Rockhal	8:00pm
18 April 2013	Esch-sur-Alzette	Luxembourg	Rockhal	8:00pm
19 April 2013	Esch-sur-Alzette	Luxembourg	Rockhal	8:00pm
20 April 2013	Esch-sur-Alzette	Luxembourg	Rockhal	2:00pm & 8:00pm
21 April 2013	Esch-sur-Alzette	Luxembourg	Rockhal	2:00pm & 8:00pm
24 April 2013	Ostrava	Czech Republic	ČEZ Aréna	7:00pm
26 April 2013	Prague	Czech Republic	O_{2} Arena	8:00pm
27 April 2013	Prague	Czech Republic	O_{2} Arena	3:00pm & 8:00pm
28 April 2013	Prague	Czech Republic	O_{2} Arena	7:00pm
3 May 2013	Istanbul	Turkey	Ülker Sports Arena	9:00pm
4 May 2013	Istanbul	Turkey	Ülker Sports Arena	3:00pm & 9:00pm
5 May 2013	Istanbul	Turkey	Ülker Sports Arena	2:30pm & 8:00pm
6 May 2013	Istanbul	Turkey	Ülker Sports Arena	9:00pm
7 May 2013	Istanbul	Turkey	Ülker Sports Arena	9:00pm
8 May 2013	Istanbul	Turkey	Ülker Sports Arena	9:00pm
9 May 2013	Istanbul	Turkey	Ülker Sports Arena	9:00pm
10 May 2013	Istanbul	Turkey	Ülker Sports Arena	3:00pm & 9:00pm
11 May 2013	Istanbul	Turkey	Ülker Sports Arena	3:00pm & 9:00pm
12 May 2013	Istanbul	Turkey	Ülker Sports Arena	2:30pm & 8:00pm
15 May 2013	Sofia	Bulgaria	Armeets Arena	8:00pm
16 May 2013	Sofia	Bulgaria	Armeets Arena	8:00pm
17 May 2013	Sofia	Bulgaria	Armeets Arena	8:00pm
18 May 2013	Sofia	Bulgaria	Armeets Arena	3:00pm & 8:00pm
19 May 2013	Sofia	Bulgaria	Armeets Arena	7:00pm
24 May 2013	Zagreb	Croatia	Arena Zagreb	8:00pm
25 May 2013	Zagreb	Croatia	Arena Zagreb	8:00pm
26 May 2013	Zagreb	Croatia	Arena Zagreb	4:00pm
30 May 2013	Sheffield	England	Motorpoint Arena Sheffield	7:30pm
31 May 2013	Sheffield	England	Motorpoint Arena Sheffield	7:30pm
1 June 2013	Sheffield	England	Motorpoint Arena Sheffield	2:30pm & 7:30pm
2 June 2013	Sheffield	England	Motorpoint Arena Sheffield	2:30pm
4 June 2013	Manchester	England	Manchester Arena	7:30pm
5 June 2013	Manchester	England	Manchester Arena	7:30pm
7 June 2013	Newcastle	England	Metro Radio Arena	7:30pm
8 June 2013	Newcastle	England	Metro Radio Arena	2:30pm & 7:30pm
9 June 2013	Newcastle	England	Metro Radio Arena	2:30pm
12 June 2013	Belfast	Northern Ireland	Odyssey Arena	8:00pm
13 June 2013	Belfast	Northern Ireland	Odyssey Arena	8:00pm
14 June 2013	Belfast	Northern Ireland	Odyssey Arena	8:00pm
15 June 2013	Belfast	Northern Ireland	Odyssey Arena	2:30pm & 7:30pm
North America
15 October 2013	Baltimore	United States	France-Merrick Performing Arts Center	8:00pm
16 October 2013	Baltimore	United States	France-Merrick Performing Arts Center	8:00pm
17 October 2013	Baltimore	United States	France-Merrick Performing Arts Center	8:00pm
18 October 2013	Baltimore	United States	France-Merrick Performing Arts Center	8:00pm
19 October 2013	Baltimore	United States	France-Merrick Performing Arts Center	2:00pm & 8:00pm
20 October 2013	Baltimore	United States	France-Merrick Performing Arts Center	1:00pm & 6:30pm
22 October 2013	Chicago	United States	Cadillac Palace Theatre	7:30pm
23 October 2013	Chicago	United States	Cadillac Palace Theatre	7:30pm
24 October 2013	Chicago	United States	Cadillac Palace Theatre	2:00pm & 7:30pm
25 October 2013	Chicago	United States	Cadillac Palace Theatre	7:30pm
26 October 2013	Chicago	United States	Cadillac Palace Theatre	2:00pm & 8:00pm
27 October 2013	Chicago	United States	Cadillac Palace Theatre	2:00pm & 7:30pm
29 October 2013	Pittsburgh	United States	Benedum Center	7:30pm
30 October 2013	Pittsburgh	United States	Benedum Center	7:30pm
31 October 2013	Pittsburgh	United States	Benedum Center	7:30pm
1 November 2013	Pittsburgh	United States	Benedum Center	8:00pm
2 November 2013	Pittsburgh	United States	Benedum Center	2:00pm & 8:00pm
3 November 2013	Pittsburgh	United States	Benedum Center	1:00pm & 6:30pm
5 November 2013	Boston	United States	Boston Opera House	7:30pm
6 November 2013	Boston	United States	Boston Opera House	7:30pm
7 November 2013	Boston	United States	Boston Opera House	7:30pm
8 November 2013	Boston	United States	Boston Opera House	8:00pm
9 November 2013	Boston	United States	Boston Opera House	2:00pm & 8:00pm
10 November 2013	Boston	United States	Boston Opera House	1:00pm & 6:30pm
12 November 2013	Nashville	United States	Andrew Jackson Hall	7:30pm
13 November 2013	Nashville	United States	Andrew Jackson Hall	7:30pm
14 November 2013	Nashville	United States	Andrew Jackson Hall	7:30pm
15 November 2013	Nashville	United States	Andrew Jackson Hall	8:00pm
16 November 2013	Nashville	United States	Andrew Jackson Hall	2:00pm & 8:00pm
17 November 2013	Nashville	United States	Andrew Jackson Hall	1:00pm & 6:30pm
19 November 2013	Minneapolis	United States	Orpheum Theatre	7:30pm
20 November 2013	Minneapolis	United States	Orpheum Theatre	7:30pm
21 November 2013	Minneapolis	United States	Orpheum Theatre	7:30pm
22 November 2013	Minneapolis	United States	Orpheum Theatre	8:00pm
23 November 2013	Minneapolis	United States	Orpheum Theatre	2:00pm & 8:00pm
24 November 2013	Minneapolis	United States	Orpheum Theatre	1:00pm & 6:30pm
26 November 2013	Thunder Bay	Canada	Thunder Bay Community Auditorium	7:00pm
27 November 2013	Thunder Bay	Canada	Thunder Bay Community Auditorium	7:00pm
29 November 2013	Schenectady	United States	Proctor's Theatre	8:00pm
30 November 2013	Schenectady	United States	Proctor's Theatre	2:00pm & 8:00pm
1 December 2013	Schenectady	United States	Proctor's Theatre	2:00pm
3 December 2013	Raleigh	United States	Raleigh Memorial Auditorium	7:30pm
4 December 2013	Raleigh	United States	Raleigh Memorial Auditorium	7:30pm
5 December 2013	Raleigh	United States	Raleigh Memorial Auditorium	7:30pm
6 December 2013	Raleigh	United States	Raleigh Memorial Auditorium	7:30pm
7 December 2013	Raleigh	United States	Raleigh Memorial Auditorium	2:00 & 7:30pm
8 December 2013	Raleigh	United States	Raleigh Memorial Auditorium	2:00 & 7:30pm
10 December 2013	Miami	United States	Ziff Ballet Opera House	8:00pm
11 December 2013	Miami	United States	Ziff Ballet Opera House	8:00pm
12 December 2013	Miami	United States	Ziff Ballet Opera House	8:00pm
13 December 2013	Miami	United States	Ziff Ballet Opera House	8:00pm
14 December 2013	Miami	United States	Ziff Ballet Opera House	2:00pm & 8:00pm
15 December 2013	Miami	United States	Ziff Ballet Opera House	1:00pm & 7:00pm
17 December 2013	Fort Myers	United States	Barbara B. Mann Performing Arts Hall	7:30pm
18 December 2013	Fort Myers	United States	Barbara B. Mann Performing Arts Hall	7:30pm
19 December 2013	Fort Myers	United States	Barbara B. Mann Performing Arts Hall	7:30pm
20 December 2013	Fort Myers	United States	Barbara B. Mann Performing Arts Hall	8:00pm
21 December 2013	Fort Myers	United States	Barbara B. Mann Performing Arts Hall	2:00pm & 8:00pm
22 December 2013	Fort Myers	United States	Barbara B. Mann Performing Arts Hall	1:00pm & 7:00pm
7 January 2014	Columbus	United States	Palace Theatre	7:30pm
8 January 2014	Columbus	United States	Palace Theatre	7:30pm
9 January 2014	Columbus	United States	Palace Theatre	7:30pm
10 January 2014	Columbus	United States	Palace Theatre	8:00pm
11 January 2014	Columbus	United States	Palace Theatre	2:00pm & 8:00pm
12 January 2014	Columbus	United States	Palace Theatre	1:30pm & 6:30pm
14 January 2014	Philadelphia	United States	Academy of Music	7:30pm
15 January 2014	Philadelphia	United States	Academy of Music	7:30pm
16 January 2014	Philadelphia	United States	Academy of Music	7:30pm
17 January 2014	Philadelphia	United States	Academy of Music	8:00pm
18 January 2014	Philadelphia	United States	Academy of Music	2:00pm & 8:00pm
19 January 2014	Philadelphia	United States	Academy of Music	1:00pm & 6:30pm
22 January 2014	Houston	United States	Sarofim Hall	7:30pm
23 January 2014	Houston	United States	Sarofim Hall	7:30pm
24 January 2014	Houston	United States	Sarofim Hall	8:00pm
25 January 2014	Houston	United States	Sarofim Hall	2:00pm & 8:00pm
26 January 2014	Houston	United States	Sarofim Hall	2:00pm & 7:30pm
27 January 2014	Houston	United States	Sarofim Hall	7:30pm
28 January 2014	Houston	United States	Sarofim Hall	7:30pm
29 January 2014	Houston	United States	Sarofim Hall	7:30pm
30 January 2014	Houston	United States	Sarofim Hall	7:30pm
31 January 2014	Houston	United States	Sarofim Hall	8:00pm
1 February 2014	Houston	United States	Sarofim Hall	2:00pm & 8:00pm
2 February 2014	Houston	United States	Sarofim Hall	2:00pm & 7:30pm
5 February 2014	Mexico City	Mexico	Auditorio Nacional	8:30pm
6 February 2014	Mexico City	Mexico	Auditorio Nacional	8:30pm
7 February 2014	Mexico City	Mexico	Auditorio Nacional	4:00pm & 10:00pm
8 February 2014	Mexico City	Mexico	Auditorio Nacional	10:30pm
9 February 2014	Mexico City	Mexico	Auditorio Nacional	1:00pm & 6:00pm
12 February 2014	Mexico City	Mexico	Auditorio Nacional	8:30pm
13 February 2014	Mexico City	Mexico	Auditorio Nacional	8:30pm
14 February 2014	Mexico City	Mexico	Auditorio Nacional	5:00pm & 10:00pm
15 February 2014	Mexico City	Mexico	Auditorio Nacional	4:30pm & 9:30pm
16 February 2014	Mexico City	Mexico	Auditorio Nacional	1:00pm & 6:00pm
4 March 2014	Dallas	United States	Music Hall at Fair Park	7:30pm
5 March 2014	Dallas	United States	Music Hall at Fair Park	7:30pm
6 March 2014	Dallas	United States	Music Hall at Fair Park	7:30pm
7 March 2014	Dallas	United States	Music Hall at Fair Park	7:30pm
8 March 2014	Dallas	United States	Music Hall at Fair Park	1:30pm & 7:30pm
9 March 2014	Dallas	United States	Music Hall at Fair Park	1:30pm & 7:30pm
11 March 2014	Dallas	United States	Music Hall at Fair Park	7:30pm
12 March 2014	Dallas	United States	Music Hall at Fair Park	7:30pm
13 March 2014	Dallas	United States	Music Hall at Fair Park	1:30pm & 7:30pm
14 March 2014	Dallas	United States	Music Hall at Fair Park	7:30pm
15 March 2014	Dallas	United States	Music Hall at Fair Park	1:30pm & 7:30pm
16 March 2014	Dallas	United States	Music Hall at Fair Park	1:30pm
18 March 2014	St. Louis	United States	Fox Theatre	8:00pm
19 March 2014	St. Louis	United States	Fox Theatre	8:00pm
20 March 2014	St. Louis	United States	Fox Theatre	8:00pm
21 March 2014	St. Louis	United States	Fox Theatre	8:00pm
22 March 2014	St. Louis	United States	Fox Theatre	2:00pm & 8:00pm
23 March 2014	St. Louis	United States	Fox Theatre	1:00pm & 6:30pm
25 March 2014	St. Louis	United States	Fox Theatre	8:00pm
26 March 2014	St. Louis	United States	Fox Theatre	8:00pm
27 March 2014	St. Louis	United States	Fox Theatre	1:00pm & 8:00pm
28 March 2014	St. Louis	United States	Fox Theatre	8:00pm
29 March 2014	St. Louis	United States	Fox Theatre	2:00pm & 8:00pm
30 March 2014	St. Louis	United States	Fox Theatre	1:00pm
1 April 2014	Detroit	United States	Fisher Theatre	7:30pm
2 April 2014	Detroit	United States	Fisher Theatre	7:30pm
3 April 2014	Detroit	United States	Fisher Theatre	7:30pm
4 April 2014	Detroit	United States	Fisher Theatre	7:30pm
5 April 2014	Detroit	United States	Fisher Theatre	2:00pm & 8:00pm
6 April 2014	Detroit	United States	Fisher Theatre	1:00pm & 6:30pm
8 April 2014	Detroit	United States	Fisher Theatre	7:30pm
9 April 2014	Detroit	United States	Fisher Theatre	7:30pm
10 April 2014	Detroit	United States	Fisher Theatre	7:30pm
11 April 2014	Detroit	United States	Fisher Theatre	7:30pm
12 April 2014	Detroit	United States	Fisher Theatre	2:00pm & 8:00pm
13 April 2014	Detroit	United States	Fisher Theatre	1:00pm & 6:30pm
15 April 2014	Providence	United States	Providence Performing Arts Center	7:00pm
16 April 2014	Providence	United States	Providence Performing Arts Center	7:00pm
17 April 2014	Providence	United States	Providence Performing Arts Center	7:30pm
18 April 2014	Providence	United States	Providence Performing Arts Center	7:30pm
19 April 2014	Providence	United States	Providence Performing Arts Center	2:00pm & 8:00pm
20 April 2014	Providence	United States	Providence Performing Arts Center	1:00pm & 6:30pm
22 April 2014	Morgantown	United States	WVU Creative Arts Center	7:30pm
23 April 2014	Morgantown	United States	WVU Creative Arts Center	7:30pm
25 April 2014	New Haven	United States	Shubert Theatre	8:00pm
26 April 2014	New Haven	United States	Shubert Theatre	2:00pm & 8:00pm
27 April 2014	New Haven	United States	Shubert Theatre	1:00pm & 6:30pm
29 April 2014	Toronto	Canada	Ed Mirvish Theatre	7:00pm
30 April 2014	Toronto	Canada	Ed Mirvish Theatre	7:00pm
1 May 2014	Toronto	Canada	Ed Mirvish Theatre	7:30pm
2 May 2014	Toronto	Canada	Ed Mirvish Theatre	7:30pm
3 May 2014	Toronto	Canada	Ed Mirvish Theatre	2:00pm & 8:00pm
4 May 2014	Toronto	Canada	Ed Mirvish Theatre	1:00pm & 7:00pm
6 May 2014	Toronto	Canada	Ed Mirvish Theatre	8:00pm
7 May 2014	Toronto	Canada	Ed Mirvish Theatre	2:00pm & 8:00pm
8 May 2014	Toronto	Canada	Ed Mirvish Theatre	2:00pm & 8:00pm
9 May 2014	Toronto	Canada	Ed Mirvish Theatre	8:00pm
10 May 2014	Toronto	Canada	Ed Mirvish Theatre	2:00pm & 8:00pm
13 May 2014	Tampa	United States	Carol Morsani Hall	7:30pm
14 May 2014	Tampa	United States	Carol Morsani Hall	7:30pm
15 May 2014	Tampa	United States	Carol Morsani Hall	7:30pm
16 May 2014	Tampa	United States	Carol Morsani Hall	8:00pm
17 May 2014	Tampa	United States	Carol Morsani Hall	2:00pm & 8:00pm
18 May 2014	Tampa	United States	Carol Morsani Hall	2:00pm & 7:30pm
20 May 2014	Indianapolis	United States	Murat Shrine	7:30pm
21 May 2014	Indianapolis	United States	Murat Shrine	7:30pm
22 May 2014	Indianapolis	United States	Murat Shrine	7:30pm
23 May 2014	Indianapolis	United States	Murat Shrine	7:30pm
24 May 2014	Indianapolis	United States	Murat Shrine	2:00pm & 8:00pm
25 May 2014	Indianapolis	United States	Murat Shrine	7:00pm
27 May 2014	Charlotte	United States	Belk Theater	7:30pm
28 May 2014	Charlotte	United States	Belk Theater	7:30pm
29 May 2014	Charlotte	United States	Belk Theater	7:30pm
30 May 2014	Charlotte	United States	Belk Theater	8:00pm
31 May 2014	Charlotte	United States	Belk Theater	2:00pm & 8:00pm
1 June 2014	Charlotte	United States	Belk Theater	1:30pm & 6:30pm
3 June 2014	Washington, D.C.	United States	Warner Theatre	8:00pm
4 June 2014	Washington, D.C.	United States	Warner Theatre	8:00pm
5 June 2014	Washington, D.C.	United States	Warner Theatre	8:00pm
6 June 2014	Washington, D.C.	United States	Warner Theatre	8:00pm
7 June 2014	Washington, D.C.	United States	Warner Theatre	3:00pm & 8:00pm
8 June 2014	Washington, D.C.	United States	Warner Theatre	3:00pm & 8:00pm
10 June 2014	Des Moines	United States	Civic Center of Greater Des Moines	7:30pm
11 June 2014	Des Moines	United States	Civic Center of Greater Des Moines	7:30pm
12 June 2014	Des Moines	United States	Civic Center of Greater Des Moines	7:30pm
13 June 2014	Des Moines	United States	Civic Center of Greater Des Moines	7:30pm
14 June 2014	Des Moines	United States	Civic Center of Greater Des Moines	2:00pm & 7:30pm
15 June 2014	Des Moines	United States	Civic Center of Greater Des Moines	1:00pm & 6:30pm
17 June 2014	Kansas City	United States	Starlight Theatre	8:00pm
18 June 2014	Kansas City	United States	Starlight Theatre	8:00pm
19 June 2014	Kansas City	United States	Starlight Theatre	8:00pm
20 June 2014	Kansas City	United States	Starlight Theatre	8:00pm
21 June 2014	Kansas City	United States	Starlight Theatre	8:00pm
22 June 2014	Kansas City	United States	Starlight Theatre	8:00pm
8 July 2014	Seattle	United States	5th Avenue Theatre	7:30pm
9 July 2014	Seattle	United States	5th Avenue Theatre	7:30pm
10 July 2014	Seattle	United States	5th Avenue Theatre	8:00pm
11 July 2014	Seattle	United States	5th Avenue Theatre	8:00pm
12 July 2014	Seattle	United States	5th Avenue Theatre	2:00pm & 8:00pm
13 July 2014	Seattle	United States	5th Avenue Theatre	1:30pm & 8:00pm
15 July 2014	Los Angeles	United States	Ahmanson Theatre	8:00pm
16 July 2014	Los Angeles	United States	Ahmanson Theatre	8:00pm
17 July 2014	Los Angeles	United States	Ahmanson Theatre	2:00pm & 8:00pm
18 July 2014	Los Angeles	United States	Ahmanson Theatre	8:00pm
19 July 2014	Los Angeles	United States	Ahmanson Theatre	2:00pm & 8:00pm
20 July 2014	Los Angeles	United States	Ahmanson Theatre	1:00pm & 6:30pm
22 July 2014	Los Angeles	United States	Ahmanson Theatre	8:00pm
23 July 2014	Los Angeles	United States	Ahmanson Theatre	8:00pm
24 July 2014	Los Angeles	United States	Ahmanson Theatre	2:00pm & 8:00pm
25 July 2014	Los Angeles	United States	Ahmanson Theatre	8:00pm
26 July 2014	Los Angeles	United States	Ahmanson Theatre	2:00pm & 8:00pm
27 July 2014	Los Angeles	United States	Ahmanson Theatre	1:00pm & 6:30pm
29 July 2014	Los Angeles	United States	Ahmanson Theatre	8:00pm
30 July 2014	Los Angeles	United States	Ahmanson Theatre	8:00pm
31 July 2014	Los Angeles	United States	Ahmanson Theatre	2:00pm & 8:00pm
1 August 2014	Los Angeles	United States	Ahmanson Theatre	8:00pm
2 August 2014	Los Angeles	United States	Ahmanson Theatre	2:00pm & 8:00pm
3 August 2014	Los Angeles	United States	Ahmanson Theatre	1:00pm & 6:30pm
5 August 2014	Los Angeles	United States	Ahmanson Theatre	8:00pm
6 August 2014	Los Angeles	United States	Ahmanson Theatre	8:00pm
7 August 2014	Los Angeles	United States	Ahmanson Theatre	2:00pm & 8:00pm
8 August 2014	Los Angeles	United States	Ahmanson Theatre	8:00pm
9 August 2014	Los Angeles	United States	Ahmanson Theatre	2:00pm & 8:00pm
10 August 2014	Los Angeles	United States	Ahmanson Theatre	1:00pm & 6:30pm
12 August 2014	Los Angeles	United States	Ahmanson Theatre	8:00pm
13 August 2014	Los Angeles	United States	Ahmanson Theatre	8:00pm
14 August 2014	Los Angeles	United States	Ahmanson Theatre	2:00pm & 8:00pm
15 August 2014	Los Angeles	United States	Ahmanson Theatre	8:00pm
16 August 2014	Los Angeles	United States	Ahmanson Theatre	2:00pm & 8:00pm
17 August 2014	Los Angeles	United States	Ahmanson Theatre	1:00pm & 6:30pm
19 August 2014	Los Angeles	United States	Ahmanson Theatre	8:00pm
20 August 2014	Los Angeles	United States	Ahmanson Theatre	8:00pm
21 August 2014	Los Angeles	United States	Ahmanson Theatre	2:00pm & 8:00pm
22 August 2014	Los Angeles	United States	Ahmanson Theatre	8:00pm
23 August 2014	Los Angeles	United States	Ahmanson Theatre	2:00pm & 8:00pm
24 August 2014	Los Angeles	United States	Ahmanson Theatre	1:00pm & 6:30pm

Cancellations and rescheduled shows

9 April 2013	Heineken Music Hall	Amsterdam	Cancelled
10 April 2013	Heineken Music Hall	Amsterdam	Cancelled
24 April 2013	O_{2} Arena	Prague	Moved to ČEZ Aréna in Ostrava
25 April 2013	O_{2} Arena	Prague	Cancelled
5 June 2013	Leeds Arena	Leeds	Postponed, never rescheduled
6 June 2013	Leeds Arena	Leeds	Postponed, never rescheduled
7 June 2013	Leeds Arena	Leeds	Postponed, never rescheduled
8 June 2013	Leeds Arena	Leeds	Postponed, never rescheduled
9 June 2013	Leeds Arena	Leeds	Postponed, never rescheduled
5 June 2013	Metro Radio Arena	Newcastle	Cancelled
6 June 2013	Metro Radio Arena	Newcastle	Cancelled
18 June 2013	Metro Radio Arena	Newcastle	Rescheduled to 5 June 2013
19 June 2013	Metro Radio Arena	Newcastle	Rescheduled 6 June 2013
20 June 2013	Metro Radio Arena	Newcastle	Rescheduled 7 June 2013
21 June 2013	Metro Radio Arena	Newcastle	Rescheduled 8 June 2013
22 June 2013	Metro Radio Arena	Newcastle	Rescheduled 9 June 2013
20 February 2014	Auditorio Telmex	Guadalajara	Cancelled
21 February 2014	Auditorio Telmex	Guadalajara	Cancelled
22 February 2014	Auditorio Telmex	Guadalajara	Cancelled
27 February 2014	Auditorio Banamex	Monterrey	Cancelled
28 February 2014	Auditorio Banamex	Monterrey	Cancelled
1 March 2014	Auditorio Banamex	Monterrey	Cancelled

== Casts ==
Europe

Principals

- Mig Ayesa — Galileo
- Lauren Samuels — Scaramouche
- Jenna Lee-James — Killer Queen
- Sean Kingsley — Khashoggi
- Rob Castell — Pop
- Rolan Bell — Britney
- Lucie Jones — Meat
- Dean Read — Rebel Leader

Female Ensemble

- Chloe Brooks — Teacher
- Catriana Sandison — Teen Queen
- Danielle Steers — Teen Queen
- Michelle Crook — Teen Queen
- Sasha Wareham — Teen Queen
- Micha Richardson — Teen Queen
- Stephanie Powell
- Alice Mogg
- Grace Holdstock

Male Ensemble

- Kane Oliver Parry
- Antony Lawrence
- Waylon Jacobs
- Ashley Cooper
- Aaron Ashley Parker
- Matt Holland
- Matthew Jeans
- James Gibbs

Female Swing

- Emily Whitehead — Dance Captain
- Charlotte Anne Steen

Male Swing

- Scott Spreadbury
- James Revell
North America

Principals

- Justin Crum — Galileo
- Ruby Lewis — Scaramouche
- Jacqueline Arnold — Killer Queen
- P.J. Griffith — Kashoggi
- Ryan Knowles — Pop
- Erica Peck — Oz
- Jared Zirilli — Britney

Female Ensemble

- Samantha Berman
- Jessica Crouch
- Saccha Dennis
- Suzanna Dupree
- Brooke Morrison
- Jennifer Mote
- Katie Murphy
- Jennifer Noble
- Stephanie Sy
- Kasey Walker

Male Ensemble

- Danny Balkwill
- Bentley Black
- Sam Digiuseppe
- Daniel Greenberg
- Stephen Hernandez
- Nathan Keen
- William Joseph Lewis
- Fred Odgaard
- Patrick Ortiz
- Jason Sermonia

Band

- Tristan Avakian — Guitar
- Mike Cohen — Bass
- Brandon Ethridge — Conductor/Keyboards
- Rick Hip-Flores — Musical Director/Conductor
- Emily Marshall — Keyboards
- David Stevens — Percussion
- Bob Wegner — Guitar
- Danny Young — Drums

== Celebrity appearances ==
Brian May

- 27 March 2013, Nottingham ("Bohemian Rhapsody")
- 16 October 2013, Baltimore ("Bohemian Rhapsody")

== Creatives, on the musical ==
(On taking the show into arenas) "After our first 10 years in Rock Theatricality, this is the next giant step for WWRY – and the show will feature a brand new arena-size design – a big night out for all!"

— Brian May

(On the show itself) "This show is all about legend", we take the legend of Queen and create our own fantastical story of young kids battling the might corporations who want to suppress their individuality and their love of music. They need a hero who can help them in their struggle, and we have two – the dreamer Galileo and the sassy rock chick Scaramouche. Guess who ends up winning?"

— Ben Elton

(About the script) "The amazing bonus is that Ben's script subtly works as a metaphor too. People definitely come out of the theatre feeling that in a strange way they now know us, Queen, and our struggle, our journey."

— Brian May

(On touring the show again) "We are looking forward to taking this true Rock Theatrical out on the road again. We had standing ovations night after night around the UK last time and we can’t wait to see that happen again."

— Phil McIntyre (Producer)

== Critical reception ==
The UK Tour has received a generally positive response:

"Elton has created a nightmarish vision of the future in which live music is banned, all instruments have been destroyed and the entire population lobotomised by the Globalsoft Corporation, capable of living on the iPlanet only through the internet. Elton uses every trick in the writer's book to contrive a link to a Queen classic. Some are so obvious you can see them coming with headlights on, but that is all part of the fun. The script is witty and inventive but to make it work one other element is needed – a cast capable of handling the power of Queen's music."

— Nottingham Post

"A great cast, fabulous singers, amazing dance routines, stunning sets, a dazzling light show and a magnificent live rock band. It's got it all. Then there's Ben Elton's superb script which, 10-years after its West End debut, has been tweaked with contemporary one-liners for this first ever arena tour."

— Sheffield Star

"But all of this is just a fun ride that leads to the most exhilarating finale that will outdo all that has come before. As the end nears, anticipation is palpable, the famed words of the most loved Queen song on everyone's lips. Superb lighting continues to dazzle, as the unbelievably talented band give their all, as the crescendo hits its peak, the fan favourite is performed, liberating the entire cast to come together to show their talent, each getting their chance to give all – Bohemian Rhapsody thunders through the arena."

— Newcastle Chronicle

However, in Manchester it received poor response from reviews:

"Well, certainly the classic songs of Freddie Mercury and co are faultless in what is, unfortunately, not an entirely seamless arena transfer of a show which has been a huge hit in the West End and has toured twice to Manchester's Palace Theatre to sold out audiences in recent years. Yet here, for the first of two nights at the arena, the place is far from full. That partly explains the lack of atmosphere in the cavernous setting – and the show itself has failed to move up a gear, save for some strobe lighting, to its more imposing stage. And for those of us in the floor seats it's a struggle to get a proper view – indeed I moved seats in the second half to save my cricked neck."

— Manchester Evening News

On opening in the US the musical was met with mixed reviews:

"There are 3 things you should know if you venture to see We Will Rock You at The Hippodrome, which I strongly suggest that you do, and quickly, as it's only in town until the 20th. 1) The future is very much like the present, only moreso. 2) Embrace the paradox of singing and dancing about not being able to make music. 3) We Will Rock You is not just for hard-core Queen fans, but for everyone who hums along when the radio plays Bicycle Race."

— Broadway World

"The show, heavily tricked out with eye-popping video, is meant to be satirical, but in too many ways it ends up being the very thing it tries to disparage — a sort of numbing Radio GaGa spectacle. This did not, however, prevent a multi-generational audience from swaying in their seats, their arms waving in the air."

— Chicago Sun-Times

"The music of We Will Rock You will definitely give you a rush, but the heavy tech and the dancing... not so much. The show runs from November 19th-24th at the Orpheum Theatre in Minneapolis; the first National U.S. tour. When I went to see the show on opening night, November 19th, I was definitely excited, but more excited by the fact that I was going to see a show at the Orpheum for the very first time. I went in knowing almost nothing about rock, and left knowing that I would never want to go to a rock concert."

— Twin Cities Daily Planet

"We Will Rock You", the musical built around the music of the band Queen, is vapid and soulless. The show, which opened Tuesday in Minneapolis, has a capable cast of buff singer-actors, but even they cannot redeem what is a loud but ultimately lame effort. The major failing of "We Will Rock You" begins at conception. Queen's songs themselves are theatrical and easy to nod along to. But the story, crafted by Ben Elton, is thin and poorly written. Unlike jukebox musicals such as "Mamma Mia!", (music of Abba) or "Jersey Boys" (The Four Seasons), the book of "We Will Rock You" does not advance the music, and vice versa. Instead, it seems, the narrative is crafted simply to get to numbers such as "Crazy Little Thing Called Love", "Fat Bottomed Girls" and, of course, the sports anthem title track."

— Hispanic Business
