= After Life (play) =

Play by Jack Thorne

- Original language: English
- Written by: Jack Thorne (play); Hirokazu Kore-eda (film)

Premiere
- Date: 2 June 2021
- Place: Dorfman Theatre, Royal National Theatre, London

After Life is a play by Jack Thorne (concept by Thorne, Bunny Christie, and Jeremy Herrin) based on the film of the same name by Hirokazu Kore-eda.

== Production history ==
The play made its world premiere in the Dorfman Theatre at the Royal National Theatre, London, running from 2 June 2021 until 7 August. It was directed by Jeremy Herrin, designed by Bunny Christie and co-produced by Headlong. The production was originally due to open in 2020, however it was postponed due to the COVID-19 pandemic. The audience were socially distanced due to the Government guidelines.

The cast included Olatunji Ayofe, Nino Furuhata, Danielle Henry, Maddie Holliday, Togo Igawa, Anoushka Lucas, Kevin McMonagle, Jack James Ryan, Simon Startin, Luke Thallon, June Watson and Millicent Wong.
