= 42 Balloons =

British musical

42 Balloons is a musical (or rock opera) by Jack Godfrey. The show is based on the true story of Larry Walters, AKA Lawnchair Larry, who fulfilled a lifelong dream on July 2, 1982, of flying up to 16,000 feet in his lawnchair carried by 42 weather balloons.

== Development ==
Jack Godfrey was working as a part time teacher in England when he came across Walters' story. An aspiring writer, he connected to the story of someone who had a dream that others thought was foolish. He began writing the musical, and was introduced to a member of the creative team behind the Broadway musical Six, which led to a connection with producer Kevin McCollum, who coordinated the show's first staging in Manchester.

== Synopsis ==
=== Act I ===
The show opens with actual audio from Larry's flight, then introduces the ensemble, who sets the stage for the show itself, confirming that this actually happened. They then ask the question everyone asks: why? Specifically: What makes somebody want to fly in a lawnchair?

We're first introduced to Larry as he applies to be a pilot in Vietnam. His poor eyesight forces him to serve instead as a cook, but we discover that Larry's dream to fly began when he went to an army surplus store as a teenager and saw the weather balloons there. He meets Carol and shares his dream with her. Ten years later, he still can't shake the dream and despite reservations from Carol's mother, Carol bankrolls the endeavor by taking out a $15,000 loan. Larry's friend Ron is introduced as a co-conspirator, as he's the only person Larry knows who owns a video camera—he'll document the event. Act 1 ends as Larry's dream is finally realized. He is flying! But Carol is terrified down below.

=== Act II ===
Act 2 begins with the end of Larry's flight, as he gets caught in power lines, and then decides to give his chair away to a kid who witnessed the landing.

Carol is getting hounded by the bank that she must repay the loan so Larry, Carol, and Ron decide to find ways to monetize the story, culminating with an appearance on Late Night with David Letterman. The debt is finally repaid, but Larry's calm is upended by receives a letter from the Darwin Awards. Initially thinking it's a group praising his accomplishments, he's humiliated to learn they gave him an award for his stupidity. Larry and Carol break up and we next see Larry joining the National Parks in 1993 as a volunteer. Carol phones Ron to tell him that she finds out Larry took his life on a trail in the park.

10 years later, the child who received Larry's chair back in 1982 has decided he wants to give the chair back to Carol. A small crowd gathers for the unveiling of the chair, which later ends up in the Smithsonian. The show ends with a call to pursue one's dreams, no matter the obstacles.

== Production history ==
=== UK (2024) ===
The musical had its premiere at The Lowry in Manchester, England in May 2024 and won writer Godfrey the award for Best Composer at the 2024 Stage Debut Awards.

=== North America (2025) ===
The musical had its North American premiere at the Chicago Shakespeare Theater in June 2025.

== Characters ==
- Larry Walters
- Carol Van Deusen – Larry's girlfriend
- Margaret Van Deusen – Carol's mother
- Ron Richland – Larry's friend
- 8 Ensemble members – Three ensemble members also play characters in the story: The Kid, who is gifted the lawnchair after witnessing the landing; David Letterman, a talk show host; and the Air Traffic Controller.

== Song list ==
Act I

SIDE ONE: UP

- Prologue
- Larry's Interview
- Big Balloon
- Interlude
- One Up in the Air
- No No No
- Carol's Soliloquy
- Somebody's Story
- 1982
- Interlude Two
- Do You Wanna Know
- Fifteen Thousand Dollars
- Interlude Three
- Something As Crazy As This
- Countdown
- Bang

End of Side One

Act II

SIDE TWO: DOWN

- 42 Balloons And A Lawn Chair
- The Flight
- The Kid and The Chair
- What Dreams Can Do
- Interlude Four
- Lawn Chair Larry
- Letterman
- Something As Crazy As This Reprise
- Interlude Five
- Before It All Falls Down
- Happily Ever After
- Helium
- Somebody's Story Reprise
- Larry's Interview Reprise
- Up And Away
- Interlude Six
- Epilogue

== Critical reception ==
The show's premiere in the U.K. received very favorable reviews. Catherine Love, writing for The Guardian, called it a "witty show" and "a charming tale of implausible dreams" full of "multiple earworms." Matt Barton of WhatsOnStage gave the show four (of five) stars, saying the show’s "twee zaniness is nicely leavened by a puckish metatheatrical self-awareness." Donald Hutera of the Times of London called the show "pretty much perfectly formed" and also "whip-smart, funny and unexpectedly but exceptionally touching."

The North American premiere in Chicago also received favorable reviews, with the Chicago Tribune's Chris Jones calling the music "easy on the ears" with "sharp, funny lyrics;" he found himself "wanting to go back and hear it again." (3 out of 4 stars) Steven Oxman, writing for the Chicago Sun-Times, called it a "sweet, energetic, ’80s-infused musical comedy" with "a lot of retro style." (3 out of 4 stars)

== Notes ==
1.also author of Hot Mess (musical) and Babies (musical)
