= Anoushka Lucas =

English singer, actress and playwright (born 1987)

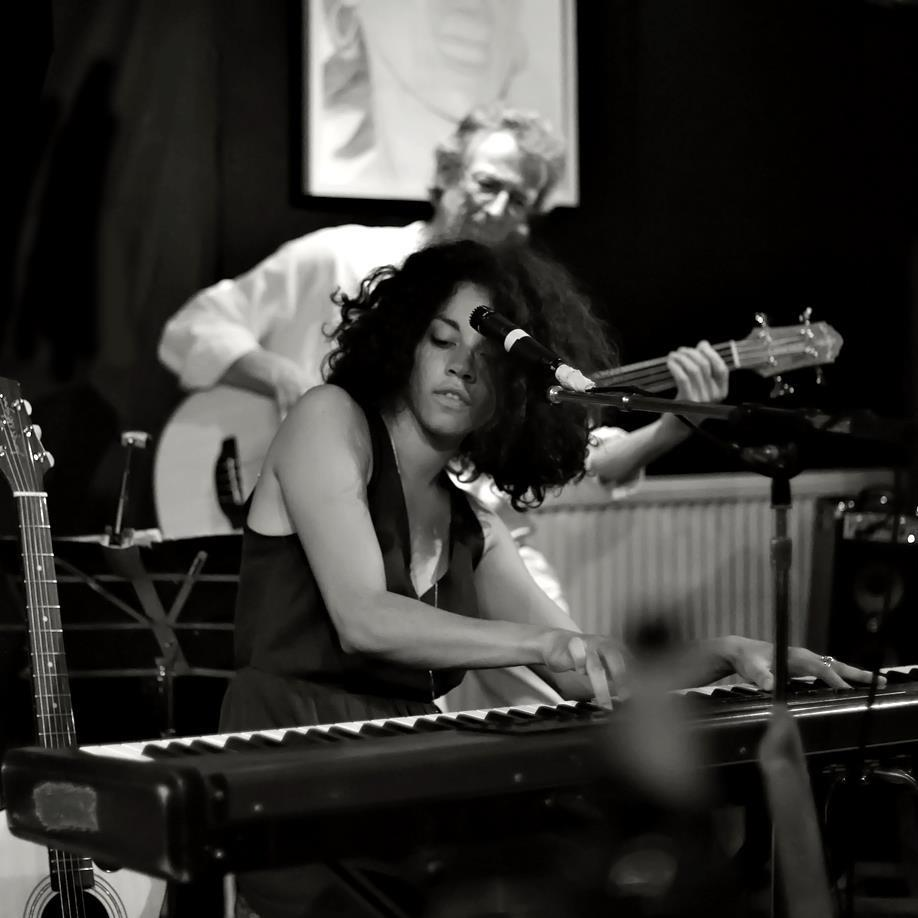
- Lucas in 2012
- Born: Anoushka Barbara Lise Lucas; 24 December 1987 (age 38); Fulham, London, England
- Education: University of Oxford
- Years active: 2009–present
- Website: www.anoushkalucas.com

Anoushka Barbara Lise Lucas (born 24 December 1987) is an English singer, composer, actress, and playwright. She began releasing music in 2009. She later went into theatre and earned a Laurence Olivier Award nomination for Best Actress in a Musical.

== Early life ==
Lucas was born in Fulham, West London, to Anglo-Indian father Chris from Southampton and French-Cameroonian mother Any, and grew up in a council flat in Hammersmith. Her parents were both musicians and she has two younger sisters.

Lucas attended the French Lycée on a scholarship. She went on to graduate from the University of Oxford in 2009 with a degree in Russian and Italian. During her time at Oxford, she joined a choir and did open-mic nights.

== Career ==
Lucas released her first self-titled EP in 2009 after graduating from Oxford. This was followed by another EP, Left to My Own Devices, in 2011.

In 2013, Lucas won a contest to perform at the Love Supreme Jazz Festival, beating hundreds of applicants also looking to perform at the new event alongside headliners Bryan Ferry and Jools Holland.

After meeting playwright Ché Walker in 2010 at the age of 22, Lucas began writing music for theatre, including her contributions to Walker's 2014 production of Klook's Last Stand (or The Ballad of Klook and Vinette) at the Park Theatre. The following year in 2015, Lucas collaborated with Sheila Atim on The Etienne Sisters at the Theatre Royal Stratford East.

Lucas performed in theatre bands before making her official acting debut in 2016 when she was cast as Mary Magdalene in the Regent's Park Open Air Theatre production of Jesus Christ Superstar. Lucas composed 8 songs for Jessica Butcher's Sparks, which won Best Musical at the 2018 Edinburgh Fringe Festival.

In February 2017, Lucas performed live on BBC Introducing performing her single "Dark Soul". The single featured on her debut album of the same name, which was released in 2019, with production credits from Martin Terefe and Oskar Winberg. Also in 2019, Anoushka appeared in the production of Chiaroscuro at The Bush Theatre.

During the COVID-19 pandemic. Lucas was cast in the Regent's Park Open Air Theatre cast of Jesus Christ Superstar, reprising her role of Mary Magdalene and sharing it with Maimuna Memon, becoming the first show to open since the nationwide lockdown.

For her performance in After Life at the National Theatre, Anoushka was nominated for Best Supporting Actress at the 2021 Black British Theatre Awards. Lucas returned to the Bush Theatre in 2022 for her debut play Elephant, a monologue on being mixed-race in Britain. She also played Princess Katherine opposite Kit Harington in Henry V at the Donmar Warehouse.

Lucas starred as Laurey Williams in the 2023 London revival of Oklahoma! at the Young Vic and then Wyndham's Theatre alongside Arthur Darvill. For her performance, Lucas was nominated for the Laurence Olivier Award for Best Actress in a Musical.

In 2025 Lucas performed in Rhinoceros at the Almeida Theatre in London, and in May a new production of her play Elephant opened at the Menier Chocolate Factory.

== Artistry ==
Lucas began writing music at the age of 14. She has cited the likes of Carole King, Zadie Smith, Amy Winehouse and Billie Holiday as her songwriting inspirations. Her debut album Dark Soul incorporated classical and jazz elements, and earned her comparisons to Norah Jones and Laura Mvula.

== Discography ==
- Anoushka Lucas (2009)
- Left to My Own Devices (2011)
- Dark Soul (2019)

== Stage ==
Year	Title	Role	Notes
2014	Klook's Last Stand	—N/a	Music; Park Theatre, London
2015	The Etienne Sisters	—N/a	Music; Theatre Royal, Stratford East
2016	Jesus Christ Superstar	Mary Magdalene	Regent's Park Open Air Theatre, London
2018	Sparks	The Musician	Music; Edinburgh Fringe Festival
2019	Chiaroscuro	Opal	Bush Theatre, London
2019	Faces in the Crowd	The Musician	Gate Theatre, London
2020	Jesus Christ Superstar	Mary Magdalene	Regent's Park Open Air Theatre, London
2021	After Life	Katie Watkins	National Theatre, London
2022	Henry V	Princess Katherine	Donmar Warehouse, London
2022	Elephant	Lylah	Playwright; Bush Theatre, London
2023	Oklahoma!	Laurey Williams	Young Vic and Wyndham's Theatre, London
2024	The Crucible	Elizabeth Proctor	Crucible Theatre, Sheffield
2024	A Face in the Crowd	Marcia Jeffries	Young Vic, London
2025	Elephant	Lylah	Playwright; Menier Chocolate Factory, London
2025	Rhinoceros		Almeida Theatre, London

== Awards and nominations ==
Year	Award	Category	Work	Result	Ref.
2018	Edinburgh Fringe Festival	Best Musical of the Fringe	Sparks	Won	
2021	Black British Theatre Awards	Best Supporting Actress	After Life	Nominated	
2023	Laurence Olivier Awards	Best Actress in a Musical	Oklahoma!	Nominated	
