= Hot Mess (musical) =

Musical written by Jack Godfrey and Ellie Coote

Hot Mess is an environmentally themed pop musical by Jack Godfrey (Lyrics and Music) and Ellie Coote (Lyrics and Book) , creators of 42 Balloons. It tells the story of relationship between Earth and Humanity, personified as two actors as a romcom.

== This is a Love Story ==
The predecessor to Hot Mess, called 'This is a Love Story' was performed on 6th November 2021, at the Dundee Rep, both staged and live streamed.

This occurred during the COVID-19 pandemic, so live-streaming made it available to a wider audience. It was COP26. It was directed by Miranda Cromwell, and produced by Vicky Graham productions.

There was a workshop performance on 2nd and 3rd February 2024 at the Birmingham Hippodrome, containing new songs and developing the production.

== Synopsis ==
Earth has been waiting over a billion years for someone to come along she can relate too. Single celled creatures are uninteresting, she thought she had found the perfect match in T-Rex, until they were wiped out. She meets Human, who seems rather weedy to be an apex predator, but he moves in, praising her natural resources. At first the relationship goes smoothly, but he starts taking her for granted, not clearing up his mess, and she becomes disenchanted. The final straw comes when he develops an interest in other planetary bodies, and they both move on, he to Mars, and she to a new AI relationship.

== Edinburgh Festival Fringe Hot Mess Production ==
Following previews at the Birmingham Hippodrome on 25th and 25th July Hot Mess was performed at The Pleasance, during the 2025 Edinburgh Festival Fringe, starring Danielle Steers as Earth and Tobias Turley (winner of Mamma Mia! I Have a Dream) as Humanity.

== Reviews ==
The Guardian gave it five stars, calling it 'blazing musical about Earth and humanity's toxic love affair' The Stage also gave five stars, calling it 'An absolute joy'.

== Awards ==
- Popcorn 2025 Writing award
- Musical Theatre Review’s New Musical Theatre Award
- The List magazine’s International Fringe Encore Series prize
