= Walmartopia =

- Show logo
- Music: Andrew Rohn
- Book: Catherine Capellaro
- Basis: Wal-Mart
- Productions: 2005 Madison; 2006 New York International Fringe Festival; 2007 Off Broadway

Walmartopia is a musical with music by Andrew Rohn and book by Catherine Capellaro. It is an irreverent political satire of big business and eternal smiley faces, a musical tale of a single mom who speaks up to her corporate employer and finds herself and her young daughter jettisoned to a future where Wal-Mart dominates the entire world.

== Productions ==
The show premiered in Madison, Wisconsin, before having a run at the New York International Fringe Festival in 2006.

Walmartopia opened off-Broadway at the Minetta Lane Theatre on September 3, 2007, following previews from August 23. The production closed on December 30, 2007, having played 10 preview performances and 136 regular performances.

This show has been performed twice in high school productions, at Cocoa Beach High School in Cocoa Beach, Florida, and at Bishop Carroll Catholic High School in Ebensburg, Pennsylvania.

== Musical numbers ==
From the original, two-act production in Madison, Wisconsin (2006):

- We Want to Know You
- I'm Tired Of Being Nibbled To Death By Guppies
- Listen to the Head

Track listing from the Original Off-Broadway Cast Recording:

- Overture
- A New Age Has Begun
- American Dream
- March of The Executives
- Baby Girl
- The Future Is Ours
- A Woman's Place
- Flash Them Bootstraps
- Heave-Ho
- Walmartopia
- Uncle Sam's Commercial
- American Dream (Reprise)
- One Stop Salvation
- The Future Is Ours (Reprise)
- Socialist Paradise (Suck On This)
- These Bullets Are Freedom
- Consume/American Dream (Reprise)
- What Kind of Mother?
- Outside the Big Box
- Band Playout
