= John Kennedy (music industry executive) =

British entertainment lawyer (born 1953)

John Kennedy (born 1953, in London) is a British entertainment lawyer whose career has been largely in the record industry.

Kennedy started his career as a lawyer, working at several record companies. In 1983, he set up a private agency specializing in the music industry. He was awarded an OBE in 1985 for his work as a trustee of the Band Aid Trust and Live Aid.

In 1996, Kennedy accepted the post of chairman and CEO at PolyGram Music and Film. He was also appointed chairman and CEO of the newly created Universal UK, the largest record company in the UK, and provided the investment (on behalf of Universal UK) to launch the musical Mamma Mia!, one of the most successful theatrical productions ever.

Kennedy was appointed president and chief operating officer at Universal Music International, the largest record company in the world, in 2001. He, Bob Geldof and Harvey Goldsmith produced in July 2005 the ten Live 8 concerts and DVDs around the world. Subsequently, they were made Chevalier de l'Ordre des Arts et des Lettres by the French government.

Kennedy was the chairman and CEO of IFPI, an organization representing the recording industry worldwide with a membership of 1,400 record companies. He left the organization in June 2010.

Kennedy currently co - manages the musician Richard Ashcroft.

In 2024, Kennedy was executive producer for the Band Aid Trust for the musical Just For One Day: The Story of the Live Aid, and published his memoir, Just for One Hour.
