= Live Around the World (Meat Loaf album) =

Live Around The World

Live album by Meat Loaf
- Released: November 1996
- Recorded: 1977 – 1996
- Genre: Rock
- Length: 2:22:54
- Label: Tommy Boy
- Producer: Meat Loaf, Dave Thoener, Steve Buslowe, Randy Nicklaus

Meat Loaf chronology
Welcome to the Neighbourhood (1995)	Live Around The World (1996)	The Very Best of Meat Loaf (1998)

Live Around the World is a live album by Meat Loaf, released in 1996 to capitalize on his two recent successes, Bat Out of Hell II: Back into Hell and Welcome to the Neighbourhood. The album was recorded at various times between 1987 and 1996. The album was limited to a release of 250,000 copies worldwide.

== Track listing ==
=== Disc One ===
1. "I'd Do Anything for Love (But I Won't Do That)" – 12:58 (Jim Steinman)
2. "You Took the Words Right Out of My Mouth (Hot Summer Night)" – 8:53 (Steinman)
3. "Life Is a Lemon and I Want My Money Back" – 7:47 (Steinman)
4. "Rock and Roll Dreams Come Through" – 8:37 (Steinman)
5. "Dead Ringer for Love" – 4:44 (Steinman)
6. "Heaven Can Wait" – 5:39 (Steinman)
7. "All Revved Up with No Place to Go" – 6:47 (Steinman)
8. "Paradise by the Dashboard Light" – 15:54 (Steinman)

=== Disc Two ===
1. "Wasted Youth" – 3:07 (Steinman)
2. "Out of the Frying Pan (And into the Fire)" – 8:37 (Steinman)
3. "Objects in the Rear View Mirror May Appear Closer than They Are" – 12:08 (Steinman)
4. "Midnight at the Lost and Found" – 5:02 (Steve Buslowe / Dan Peyronel / Paul Christie / Meat Loaf)
5. "Good Girls Go to Heaven (Bad Girls Go Everywhere)" – 6:43 (Steinman)
6. "What You See Is What You Get" – 3:46 (Patti Jerome / Michael Valvano)
7. "Two Out of Three Ain't Bad" – 8:17 (Steinman)
8. "Hot Patootie (Whatever Happened to Saturday Night?)" – 3:02 (Richard O'Brien)
9. "For Crying Out Loud" – 9:55 (Steinman)
10. "Bat Out of Hell" – 10:55 (Steinman)

== Personnel ==
Musical Director: Steve Buslowe

- Meat Loaf — vocals
- Pat Thrall — lead guitars
- Kasim Sulton — rhythm guitars, keyboards, backing vocals
- Steve Buslowe — bass, backing vocals
- Mark Alexander — piano, keyboards, backing vocals
- John Miceli — drums, percussion
- Patti Russo — female lead and backing vocals
- Pearl Aday — backing vocals

=== Special Guests ===
- Paul Mirkovich — additional keyboards on "All Revved Up"
- Jeff Bova — organ on "All Revved Up" and "What You See..."
- Jim Steinman — piano on "Heaven Can Wait" and "Objects...", voice on "Wasted Youth"
- Steve Lukather — additional guitar on "For Crying Out Loud"
