= The Very Best of Meat Loaf =

1998 compilation album by Meat Loaf

Compilation album by Meat Loaf
- Released: November 2, 1998
- Recorded: 1977–1998
- Genre: Rock
- Length: 116:57
- Label: Virgin (UK), Epic (US)

Meat Loaf chronology
Live Around the World (1996)	The Very Best of Meat Loaf (1998)	VH1: Storytellers (1999)

Professional ratings
Review scores
Source	Rating
AllMusic	4/5 stars
The Rolling Stone Album Guide	2/5 stars

The Very Best of Meat Loaf is a 1998 album spanning the first 21 years of Meat Loaf's recording career. Although not reaching the top ten in the United Kingdom, it was certified double platinum there in 2013. The album features many of Meat Loaf's best-known songs as well as a few from his lesser known albums of the 1980s.

Besides hits like "Paradise by the Dashboard Light" and "I'd Do Anything for Love (But I Won't Do That)", The Very Best of Meat Loaf contains three new tracks. Two of those are written by Andrew Lloyd Webber and Jim Steinman and are adapted from their musical Whistle Down the Wind; both of these tracks were produced by Steinman. The third new track, "Is Nothing Sacred" is written by Steinman and lyricist Don Black, and produced by Russ Titelman (the single version of this song is a duet with Patti Russo, whereas the album version is a solo song by Meat Loaf. The single version would later appear on the VH1 Storytellers CD).

Both Bat Out of Hell and Bat Out of Hell II: Back into Hell are prominently featured with five tracks from the first and four from the second. The album did not feature any songs from his 1986 album Blind Before I Stop.

The album was re-released in 2003 with the same tracks in a different order, and did so again in 2011 with the original order but now under the title The Essential Meat Loaf. Following an appearance on VH1 Storytellers in 1999 (which was released as an album and a DVD), Meat Loaf's next studio album was the 2003 album, Couldn't Have Said It Better.

== Track listing ==
=== Disc 1 ===
No.	Title	Writer(s)	From album	Length
1.	"Home by Now/No Matter What"	Andrew Lloyd Webber, Jim Steinman	Previously unreleased (1998)	8:25
2.	"Life Is a Lemon and I Want My Money Back" (remix)	Steinman	Bat Out of Hell II: Back into Hell (1993)	8:07
3.	"You Took the Words Right Out of My Mouth (Hot Summer Night)" (Intro spoken by Steinman and Marcia McClain)	Steinman	Bat Out of Hell (1977)	5:04
4.	"Two Out of Three Ain't Bad"	Steinman	Bat Out of Hell (1977)	5:23
5.	"Modern Girl"	Paul Jacobs, Sarah Durkee	Bad Attitude (1984)	4:28
6.	"Rock and Roll Dreams Come Through"	Steinman	Bat Out of Hell II: Back into Hell (1993)	5:50
7.	"Is Nothing Sacred"	Steinman, Don Black	Previously unreleased (1998)	6:37
8.	"Paradise by the Dashboard Light" (I. Paradise/II. Let Me Sleep on It/III. Praying for the End of Time; duet with Ellen Foley)	Steinman	Bat Out of Hell (1977)	8:26
9.	"Heaven Can Wait"	Steinman	Bat Out of Hell (1977)	4:49

=== Disc 2 ===
No.	Title	Writer(s)	From album	Length
1.	"I'd Do Anything for Love (But I Won't Do That)" (featuring Lorraine Crosby)	Steinman	Bat Out of Hell II: Back into Hell (1993)	11:58
2.	"A Kiss Is a Terrible Thing to Waste" (featuring Bonnie Tyler)	Lloyd Webber, Steinman	Whistle Down the Wind (1996)	7:36
3.	"I'd Lie for You (And That's the Truth)" (edited version; featuring Patti Russo)	Diane Warren	Welcome to the Neighborhood (1995)	6:27
4.	"Not a Dry Eye in the House"	Warren	Welcome to the Neighborhood (1995)	5:55
5.	"Nocturnal Pleasure" (Monologue spoken by Steinman)	Steinman	Dead Ringer (1981)	0:37
6.	"Dead Ringer for Love" (featuring Cher)	Steinman	Dead Ringer (1981)	4:20
7.	"Midnight at the Lost and Found"	Marvin Lee Aday, Steve Buslowe, Paul Christie, Dan Peyronel	Midnight at the Lost and Found (1983)	3:31
8.	"Objects in the Rear View Mirror May Appear Closer Than They Are" (edited version)	Steinman	Bat Out of Hell II: Back into Hell (1993)	9:45
9.	"Bat Out of Hell"	Steinman	Bat Out of Hell (1977)	9:48

Japanese Bonus track
No.	Title	Writer(s)	From Album	Length
10.	"I'd Do Anything for Love (But I Won't Do That)" (live featuring Patti Russo)	Steinman	Previously unreleased	12:58

=== 2003 re-release ===
- Disc one
1. "Bat Out of Hell"
2. "Dead Ringer for Love"
3. "Two Out of Three Ain't Bad"
4. "Rock and Roll Dreams Come Through"
5. "I'd Lie for You (And That's the Truth)"
6. "Modern Girl"
7. "Midnight at the Lost and Found"
8. "Objects in the Rear View Mirror May Appear Closer Than They Are"
9. "Life Is a Lemon and I Want My Money Back" (remix)
- Disc two
1. "I'd Do Anything for Love (But I Won't Do That)"
2. "You Took the Words Right Out of My Mouth (Hot Summer Night)"
3. "Heaven Can Wait"
4. "Not a Dry Eye in the House"
5. "Paradise by the Dashboard Light"
6. "A Kiss Is a Terrible Thing to Waste"
7. "Is Nothing Sacred"
8. "Home by Now/No Matter What"
9. "Nocturnal Pleasure"

== Charts ==
Chart (1998)	Peak position
Australian Albums (ARIA)	116
Dutch Albums (Album Top 100)	29
German Albums (Offizielle Top 100)	5
New Zealand Albums (RMNZ)	22
Scottish Albums (Official Charts)	18
Swedish Albums (Sverigetopplistan)	39
UK Albums (Official Charts)	14

Chart (2022)	Peak position
Swiss Albums (Schweizer Hitparade)	24

== Certifications and sales ==
Region	Certification	Certified units/sales
United Kingdom (BPI)	2× Platinum	600,000^{*}
United States (RIAA)	Gold	500,000^{^}
^{*} Sales figures based on certification alone.^{^} Shipments figures based on certification alone.
