= VH1: Storytellers (Meat Loaf album) =

Live album by Meat Loaf
- Released: September 14, 1999
- Recorded: October 1998
- Genre: Rock
- Producer: Kasim Sulton

Meat Loaf chronology
| The Very Best of Meat Loaf (1998) | VH1: Storytellers (1999) | Couldn't Have Said It Better (2003) |

Meat Loaf video chronology
| Bat Out of Hell II: Picture Show (1994) | VH1: Storytellers (1999) | Live with the Melbourne Symphony Orchestra (2004) |

VH1: Storytellers is a live album by Meat Loaf, released in 1999. Meat Loaf told humorous stories of his career as a singer and how he unfolded into rock stardom. The DVD version has two additional songs. Some songs on the CD are taken from Meat Loaf's Hard Rock Live performance (also for VH1). Others were taken from the pre-show soundcheck. The album peaked at No. 129 on the Billboard 200, making it his lowest charting album in the United States.

Professional ratings
Review scores
| Source | Rating |
|---|---|
| Allmusic | 3.5/5 stars |

== Background ==
The show was to have been Meat and Jim Steinman together. However, due to Jim falling ill, Meat had to do the show alone. This worried the producers, as Storytellers is about the concept of each song that an artist wrote that they were about to perform, and Meat did not write his own songs. To counter this, according to the liner notes of the CD, Meat improvised several things, such as the actions on the Radio Broadcast portion of Paradise by the Dashboard Light. For the stories, he instead goes into detail about how the hit album Bat Out of Hell was conceived, with each song preceded by him discussing how the song fit into the making of the album and the difficulties that came into making, producing, and publishing the album. Meat also pitched a solution to how to get around the length of the songs: break up songs into two television segments, with stopping the song for a commercial, then finishing the song once they returned.

== Track listing ==
1. "All Revved Up with No Place to Go"
2. "Life Is a Lemon and I Want My Money Back" – Hard Rock Live version
3. "Story" (Audience Member talks to Meat)
4. "You Took the Words Right Out of My Mouth (Hot Summer Night)"
5. "Story" (Meat answers "What is 'That'?" when talking about I'd Do Anything for Love)
6. "I'd Do Anything for Love (But I Won't Do That)" – Hard Rock Live version
7. "Lawyers, Guns and Money" – Hard Rock Live version
8. "Story" (How Meat met Jim Steinman)
9. "More Than You Deserve"
10. "Story" (Meat discussing pitching an album, which would become Bat Out of Hell)
11. "Heaven Can Wait" – Soundcheck before the show
12. "Story" (Meat discusses the difficulties of demoing Bat, getting a record deal, and how long Steinman's songs were before being published)
13. "Paradise by the Dashboard Light"
14. "Story" (How Meat hates going on television, and what song "broke" Bat)
15. "Two Out of Three Ain't Bad" – Hard Rock Live version
16. "Story" (What the title song of Bat was written for)
17. "Bat Out of Hell" – Soundcheck before the show
18. "Is Nothing Sacred" – Bonus Track feat. Patti Russo

=== DVD exclusive tracks ===
1. "Two Out of Three Ain't Bad" – Alternate version
2. "I'd Do Anything for Love (But I Won't Do That)" – Alternate version
3. "Heaven Can Wait" – Alternate version
4. "Bat Out of Hell" – Alternate version
5. "A Kiss Is a Terrible Thing to Waste"
6. "Rock and Roll Dreams Come Through"

== Personnel ==
- Meat Loaf – lead vocals, guitar
- Patti Russo – female lead vocals
- Damon La Scot – lead guitar
- Ray Anderson – rhythm guitar, keyboards, vocals
- Kasim Sulton – bass guitar, acoustic guitar, vocals, musical director
- Tom Brislin – piano, vocals
- John Miceli – drums
- Pearl Aday – backing vocals

== Charts ==
| Chart (1999) | Peak position |
|---|---|
| US Billboard 200 | 129 |

== Certifications ==
Video certifications for Storytellers
| Region | Certification | Certified units/sales |
|---|---|---|
| Australia (ARIA) | Gold | 7,500^{^} |
| United Kingdom (BPI) | Gold | 25,000^{*} |
^{*} Sales figures based on certification alone.^{^} Shipments figures based on certification alone.
