= Bat Out of Hell II: Picture Show =

Bat out of Hell II: Picture Show

Video by Meat Loaf
- Released: 1994
- Genre: Rock
- Length: 57 minutes
- Label: Virgin Records / Picture Music International

Meat Loaf chronology
Bad Attitude - Live! (1985)	Bat out of Hell II: Picture Show (1994)	VH1: Storytellers (1999)

Bat Out of Hell II: Picture Show is a 1994 music video by Meat Loaf. Besides the three music videos directed by Michael Bay for the singles from Bat Out of Hell II: Back into Hell, the video contains three live performances and interviews with Meat Loaf and songwriter/producer Jim Steinman. Until the release of the 2006 Collectors Edition of Bat Out of Hell II, this was the only official release of the video clips.

== Track listing ==
1. "I'd Do Anything for Love (But I Won't Do That)" (live performance) — 7:29
2. "Rock and Roll Dreams Come Through" (full length video) — 5:46
3. "Life Is a Lemon and I Want My Money Back" (live performance) — 8:41
4. "Objects in the Rear View Mirror May Appear Closer than They Are" (full length video) — 7:42
5. "Paradise by the Dashboard Light" (live performance) — 10:18
6. "I'd Do Anything for Love (But I Won't Do That)" (full length video) — 7:43
- All songs written, arranged and produced by Jim Steinman
- Videos directed by Micheal Bay
- Live performances courtesy of VH1 / MTV Networks

== Meat Loaf Musicians ==
- Meat Loaf: Lead Vocals
- Patti Russo: Female Lead and Backing Vocals (credited as Patricia Rousseau)
- Pat Thrall: Guitars, Backing Vocals
- Kasim Sulton: Guitars, Keyboards, Backing Vocals
- Steve Buslowe: Bass, Backing Vocals, Music Director
- Mark Alexander: Piano, Backing Vocals
- John Miceli: Drums

== Certifications ==
Region	Certification	Certified units/sales
United Kingdom (BPI)	Gold	25,000^{*}
^{*} Sales figures based on certification alone.
