= Pearl Aday =

American singer (born 1975)

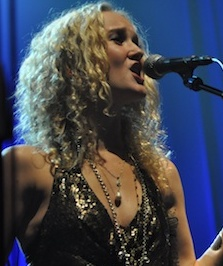
- Born: Pearl Maria Edmonds; April 15, 1975 (age 51)
- Occupation: Singer
- Years active: 1994–present
- Spouse: Scott Ian
- Children: 1
- Parents: Meat Loaf (adopted) (father); Leslie Aday (mother)
- Relatives: Amanda Aday (half-sister)

Pearl Aday (born April 15, 1975) is an American singer. She is the adopted daughter of vocalist Marvin Lee Aday, better known as Meat Loaf, and was a member of his touring band Neverland Express for nine years starting in 1994. She sang backing vocals on numerous albums, tours, and television performances with her father. She has also been a backing singer for Mötley Crüe. She is currently the lead singer of her own band "Pearl" and released her debut album on Megaforce/RED/Sony Music on January 19, 2010. Aday also co-organized the hard rock group Motor Sister with her husband Scott Ian, singing backing vocals.

== Early life ==
Aday was born to Leslie G. Edmonds and Clark Pierson, who was a drummer in singer Janis Joplin's group, Full Tilt Boogie Band. She was adopted by Meat Loaf as a young child, after his marriage to Leslie. Pearl has a half sister named Amanda Aday.

Aday attended High School in Redding, Connecticut graduating from Joel Barlow High School in 1993. Her senior year she was the lead in the Senior Class Play How to Succeed in Business Without Really Trying. Aday went to Emerson College in Boston, Massachusetts, majoring in creative writing, but shortly thereafter began a music career.

== Career ==
In 1994, she was a backing singer for Meat Loaf's 1994 Everything Louder summer tour promoting the album Bat out of Hell II, as well as the follow-up tour in 1996, Born to Rock. She was a member of her father's backing band when they performed at the inaugural ball in 1997 for Bill Clinton. She became a full-fledged member of Neverland Express, Meat Loaf's touring band, from 1998-2003. In 2003, she sang on Meat Loaf's album Couldn't Have Said It Better on the duet "Man of Steel." Pearl opened for Meat Loaf at the October 31, 2007 concert of the Seize the Night tour.

She sang backing vocals at two shows with Sixx:A.M. and was a backing singer for Mötley Crüe on their "Maximum Rock" tour, featured on the DVD release of the tour, "Lewd, Crued, and Tattooed." She was also with a Los Angeles-based band named Stella, fronted by Nancy Hower (Star Trek: Voyager), which broke up before releasing an album. She currently releases music with Pearl, a band in which she is the lead singer. The other musicians in the band are Mother Superior, best known for their work in The Rollins Band with Henry Rollins.

Aday is married to Anthrax guitarist Scott Ian. Her photographs appeared on Music of Mass Destruction: Live from Chicago released by Anthrax in 2004. In 2006, Aday appeared in episodes 3-7 of VH1’s Supergroup (TV series), which starred her husband Scott Ian, Ted Nugent, Sebastian Bach, Evan Seinfeld, and Jason Bonham.

Aday now fronts the band Pearl which also features her husband Scott on guitar. In March 2008, they opened for Velvet Revolver in the UK.

Pearl opened for Meat Loaf's Casa de Carne Tour on July 4, 2008 (Bath, England), July 11, 2008 (Castle Howard, York, England), July 13, 2008 (Blickling Hall, Norfolk, England), July 21, 2008 (Zitadelle Berlin, Germany) and on July 23, 2008 (Stadtpark Hamburg, Germany). In May 2009, she appeared on the FOX game show "Don't Forget the Lyrics" along with her father Meat Loaf and his duet partner Patti Russo: they won $500,000 for charity. She headlined her own 13-date 2010 US tour before rejoining Meat Loaf as an opening act in support of the Hang Cool Tour in 2010. In support of her first album, she also appeared on the January 21, 2010 episode of Jimmy Kimmel Live!. On September 18, 2010, Pearl opened for Heart (band) at Gibson Amphitheatre in Hollywood.

Both she and her husband took a break from their musical careers, as the couple had a son named Revel Young Ian on June 19, 2011.

In 2015, Aday sang backing vocals on Motor Sister’s album Ride. Following the release of her album Heartbreak and Canyon Revelry, Pearl opened for Cody Jinks’ West Coast shows in August 2018. Aday was a guest vocalist sitting in with The 8G Band on Late Night with Seth Meyers on September 4-6, 2018. On September 20, 2019, she performed at Bourbon & Beyond Festival. In 2020, Aday co-wrote and sang backing vocals on the Ward Davis song “Threads”. In 2022, she sang on Motor Sister’s album Get Off and co-wrote two of the tracks. In 2024, Aday sang on the duet “Take This Bottle” with Cody Jinks.

Aday has also codesigned a t-shirt line and a silk luxe lounge line, Pearl X Romp, with designer Nina Morgan-Jones.

== Discography ==
=== Pearl ===
- Little Immaculate White Fox (2010)
- The Swing House Sessions (Live & Acoustic) (2011)
- Heartbreak and Canyon Revelry (2018)

Pearl Aday has been featured on many different albums and compilations by various artists.

=== Meat Loaf ===
- Welcome to the Neighbourhood (1995) – backing vocals
- Live Around the World (1996) – backing vocals
- The Very Best of Meat Loaf (1998) – backing vocals
- VH1 Storytellers (1999) – backing vocals
- Couldn't Have Said It Better (2003) – backing vocals and duet on "Man of Steel", also a UK single release
- "Los Angeloser" (2010) – backing vocals on B-side "Boneyard"

=== Filter ===
- Title of Record (1999) – backing vocals

=== Mother Pearl ===
- Broken Thorny Crown (2004) – lead vocals

=== Compilation Album ===
- An All Star Tribute to Shania Twain (2005) - lead vocals on “That Don’t Impress Me Much”

=== Ace Frehley ===
- Anomaly (2009) – backing vocals on “Genghis Khan”

=== Armored Saint ===
- Win Hands Down (2015) – duet on "With a Full Head of Steam"

=== Motor Sister ===
- Ride (2015) – backing vocals
- Get Off (2022) - backing vocals, lead vocals on ‘’Coming For You’’

=== Black Star Riders ===
- Heavy Fire (2017) – backing vocals on "Testify or Say Goodbye”
- Another State of Grace (2019) – backing vocals on "What Will It Take”

=== Stone Sour ===
- Hydrograd (2017) – backing vocals on "St. Marie"

=== Scott Ian ===
- Black Night: Sword of Rage (Music from the Original Pinball Soundtrack) (2019) - backing vocals on “Black Night”

=== Posehn ===
- Grandpa Metal (2020) – backing vocal on "Monster Mosh"

=== Ward Davis ===
- Black Cats and Crows (2020) – backing vocals and co-writer on "Threads"

=== Cody Jinks ===
- Change the Game (2024) – duet on "Take This Bottle"
