= Bat Out of Hell (disambiguation) =

Bat Out of Hell may refer to:

- Bat Out of Hell, 1977 album by Meat Loaf
  - "Bat Out of Hell" (song), title song from above album
- Bat Out of Hell II: Back into Hell, 1993 album by Meat Loaf
  - Bat Out of Hell II: Picture Show, 1993 music video by Meat Loaf
- Bat Out of Hell III: The Monster Is Loose, 2006 album by Meat Loaf
- Bat Out of Hell: Live with the Melbourne Symphony Orchestra, 2004 live album
- Bat Out of Hell Tour, 1977-1979 live Meat Loaf tour for promoting of 1977 album
- Bat Out of Hell (TV series), 1966 British television series
- Bat Out of Hell The Musical, 2017 rock musical written by Jim Steinman
- The Mitchell B-25 bomber flown by William G. Farrow during the Doolittle Raid
