= Live at Wembley (Meat Loaf album) =

Live album by Meat Loaf
- Released: October 26, 1987
- Recorded: March 1–2, 1987
- Venue: Wembley Arena (London)
- Genre: Rock
- Length: 70:47
- Label: Arista
- Producer: Tom Edmonds, Meat Loaf

Meat Loaf chronology
Blind Before I Stop (1986)	Live at Wembley (1987)	Bat Out of Hell II: Back into Hell (1993)

Singles from Live at Wembley
- 1. "Bat Out of Hell" Released: October 1987

Professional ratings
Review scores
Source	Rating
New Musical Express	10/10

Live at Wembley is a 1987 live album by Meat Loaf. It was recorded live at Wembley Arena in London March 1–2, 1987. Meat Loaf's brother-in-law Tom Edmonds co-produced and mixed the album, which featured arrangements by Meat Loaf, Steve Buslowe, and Bob Kulick. The touring continued mainly as a ploy to keep Meat Loaf in the public eye and out of bankruptcy.

To try to get his career back off the ground, Meat Loaf started touring small venues, anywhere that would have him, such as pubs and clubs. Slowly, he developed a faithful following which grew to the point where they were unable to fit into the venues that Meat Loaf was playing and then they too began to grow. This carried on until the late 1980s where he began to sell out arenas and stadiums again. He even sold over 10,000 tickets at Ohio State. Leslie studied to be a travel agent so they could save on travel expenses and they toured all over the United States, Germany, England, Scandinavia, Ireland, Italy, Spain, Abu Dhabi, Oman and Bahrain. Due to the success of the touring, Meat Loaf and Jim Steinman got to work on Bat Out Of Hell II: Back Into Hell which was released in 1993, seven years after Blind Before I Stop.

== Track listing ==
=== Side one ===
1. "Blind Before I Stop" – 3:54
2. "Rock 'n' Roll Mercenaries" – 5:33
3. "You Took the Words Right Out of My Mouth (Hot Summer Night)" – 7:49
4. "Midnight at the Lost and Found" – 3:43
5. "Modern Girl" – 5:44

=== Side two ===
1. "Paradise by the Dashboard Light" – 10:04
2. "Two Out of Three Ain't Bad" – 8:06
3. "Bat Out of Hell" – 10:29

=== bonus EP Side one ===
1. "Masculine" – 6:50

=== bonus EP Side two ===
1. "Rock 'n' Roll Medley" – 8:34
  - "Johnny B. Goode"
  - "Jailhouse Rock"
  - "Slow Down"
  - "Blue Suede Shoes"
  - "Johnny B. Goode" (Reprise)

Music and lyrics for tracks 3 and 6–8 written by Jim Steinman
Arranged by Meat Loaf, Steve Buslowe, Bob Kulick

== Personnel ==
- Meat Loaf — vocals
- Paul Jacobs — piano overdubs

=== The Neverland Express ===
- Bob Kulick — guitars
- Alan Merrill — guitars, lead (track 2) and backing vocals
- Steve Buslowe — bass, backing vocals
- Frank Doyle — keyboards
- Chuck Burgi — drums
- Amy Goff — vocals
- Elaine Goff — vocals

== Charts ==
Chart (1987)	Peak position
UK Albums (OCC)	60
