= Bat Out of Hell II: Back into Hell =

Studio album by Meat Loaf
- Released: September 14, 1993
- Recorded: August 1991–June 1993
- Studios: Ocean Way, Hollywood; Power Station, New York City
- Genre: Rock
- Length: 75:38
- Labels: MCA (North America); Virgin (worldwide)
- Producer: Jim Steinman

Meat Loaf chronology
Blind Before I Stop (1986)	Bat Out of Hell II: Back into Hell (1993)	Welcome to the Neighbourhood (1995)

Jim Steinman chronology
Original Sin (1989)	Bat Out of Hell II: Back Into Hell (1993)

Singles from Bat Out of Hell II: Back Into Hell
- 1. "I'd Do Anything for Love (But I Won't Do That)" Released: August 23, 1993; 2. "Rock and Roll Dreams Come Through" Released: November 29, 1993; 3. "Objects in the Rear View Mirror May Appear Closer Than They Are" Released: April 25, 1994

Bat Out of Hell II: Back into Hell is the sixth studio album by American rock singer Meat Loaf and the second in the Bat Out of Hell trilogy, which was written and produced by Jim Steinman. It was released on September 14, 1993, sixteen years after Meat Loaf's first solo album Bat Out of Hell. The album reached number 1 in the United States, United Kingdom and Canada. Three tracks were released as singles, including "I'd Do Anything for Love (But I Won't Do That)", which reached number 1 in 28 countries.

The album was released by MCA in North America, and Virgin Records internationally. The third part of the Bat trilogy, Bat Out of Hell III: The Monster Is Loose, was released in 2006. Like the first album of the trilogy, Bat Out of Hell II was a commercial success, selling over 14 million copies worldwide.

== History ==
In the midst of the success of Bat Out of Hell, desperate for a follow-up, management and the record company put pressure on Steinman to stop touring in order to write a follow-up, provisionally titled Renegade Angel. In a 1981 BBC Rock Hour Special interview, Jim Steinman recalls the writing process.

I started writing what I felt was Bat Out of Hell part 2, definitely like The Godfather part 1 and part 2, that's how I saw it. I wanted to do a continuation and I wanted to do an album that went even further and that was more extreme, if possible, which a lot of people felt wasn't possible but I just wanted to see if I could make a record that was even more heroic because that's what I thought of it ... Bat Out of Hell to me was ultimately very heroic though it was funny ... and I wanted to do one that to me would be even more heroic and more epic and a little more operatic and passionate.

In a 1993 promotional interview for the album, Steinman reasserts the continuation of the Bat world. "I didn't call it Bat Out of Hell II just to identify with the first record. It really does feel like an extension of that... It was a chance to go back to that world and explore it deeper. It always seemed incomplete because I conceived it like a film, and what would you do without Die Hard 2?" Meat Loaf himself was more succinct, telling an interview at the time, "We called it Bat Out of Hell II 'cos that would help it sell shitloads."

Steinman rejoined Meat Loaf and the band for a live performance in Toronto, Ontario, Canada in 1978 with the intention of going through the songs for Bat II after the show. However, someone broke into their dressing rooms during the show and stole several possessions, including the new lyric book. Then, Meat Loaf lost his voice and was unable to record Renegade Angel. Steinman says "he sounded literally like the little girl in The Exorcist... like a dragon trying to sing—it was a horrifying sound." Steinman "kept writing the music to Bat Out of Hell part 2... my sequel." Not being able to "bear for people not to hear those songs," Steinman recorded the album, retitled Bad for Good, as a solo project, although Rory Dodd contributed lead vocals on some songs. Four songs from Bad for Good were included on Bat Out of Hell II. In 1989, Steinman formed all-female vocal group Pandora's Box. The album, Original Sin, was a commercial flop, but featured two songs which would also appear on Bat II. However, according to Meat Loaf, one of them was written for him, saying that "Jim put 'It Just Won't Quit' on Original Sin without telling me. I could have strangled him."

By the time Meat Loaf set about finally recording Bat II in the early 1990s, the industry's enthusiasm for the project had waned. According to the artist's then manager, Tommy Manzi, in an interview with HitQuarters, "That project was considered a joke as far as the industry was concerned," and Manzi's management company Left Bank were "laughed at" for attempting to revive the fortunes of a well-established act rather than focus on "the next hip band".

== Production ==
After a series of financial and legal disputes during the 1980s, Steinman and Meat Loaf met at the singer's house in Connecticut at Christmas in either 1989 or 1990, and sang Bat Out of Hell on piano. Steinman says that "working together again seemed like the cool thing to do."

Steinman gave Meat Loaf half the songs for the album, but refused to give him any more until he changed managers. The singer was being managed by Walter Winneck and George Gilbert, who Meat Loaf credits as being "honest guys" but, under Steinman's influence, thinks would be "incapable of dealing with the record companies" on Bat II. On Steinman's recommendation, he hired Allen Kovac.

Recording of the album took place at Ocean Way Recording in Los Angeles, California, then at The Power Station in New York City, New York.

Many of the performers from the original album returned for the sequel. Roy Bittan performed keyboard and piano on most tracks, with Todd Rundgren, Ellen Foley, Rory Dodd and Kasim Sulton returning to provide background vocals. Meat Loaf and the musicians are credited as co-arrangers, and Bittan and long-term Steinman collaborator Steven Rinkoff are credited as associate producers. The album was mixed by David Thoener with the exception of the final track, which was mixed by Rinkoff.

According to Meat Loaf, he and Steinman had only one "big fight" throughout the album's production, which occurred during the mixing of "Life Is a Lemon". Production took a long time, mainly because of the length of the songs. The singer says, "Jim's songs may be miniature operas, but they're always too long for radio." Steinman fought with Kovac over the edit of "I'd Do Anything for Love", with the manager advising that radio stations were unlikely to play anything over five minutes long.

Steinman had secured a contract with Meat Loaf's recording label MCA for Lorraine Crosby, a club singer from North East England whom he was managing. While visiting the company's recording studios on Sunset Boulevard, Crosby was asked to provide guide vocals for Meat Loaf, who was recording "I'd Do Anything for Love". Crosby recalls, "I went and sang it twice and I never thought anything more of it until six months later when I got a phone call saying, 'Would you mind if we used your vocals?'" Cher, Melissa Etheridge and Bonnie Tyler had been considered for the role. However, as Crosby had recorded her part as guide vocals, she did not receive any royalties from the song.

== Compositions ==
Duet - I can do that
An extract from the duet part, performed by Lorraine Crosby, in which she suggests things that he can do.

Duet - I won't do that
The final part from the duet, in which Meat Loaf declares what he won't do.

The album opens with "I'd Do Anything for Love (But I Won't Do That)", a marathon twelve-minute opus which was edited for single release in some countries. The track begins with a guitar played to sound like a revving motorcycle, a reference to Todd Rundgren's contribution in the middle of "Bat Out of Hell". Each verse comprises two things that he would do for love, followed by one thing that he would not do. It is that latter parts of each chorus that is the "that" of the title. However, some people misunderstand the lyrics, claiming that the singer never identifies what the "that" is that he is unwilling to do, a confusion that Steinman predicted during production. The song combines stadium rock and power ballad for much of its twelve minutes. However, near the end of the song, a female vocalist is introduced. Credited in the liner notes as Mrs. Loud, this part was sung by Lorraine Crosby. Some countries managed to play the opus from start to finish.

Rundgren points out that "the themes of the songs were darker." The second track, "Life is a Lemon and I Want My Money Back", demonstrates this pessimism. Several things are identified as "defective", including love, sex, gods, childhood and the future. AllMusic labels it "a stomping rocker that wraps serious feelings in a cryptically witty metaphor." Despite the pessimism, both AllMusic and Meat Loaf point out that "it is a funny song."

The third track, "Rock and Roll Dreams Come Through", is a prayer to rock music, celebrating how it is always there to help you through troubled times. One of its lyrics is "You're never alone, 'cause you can put on the 'phones and let the drummer tell your heart what to do." The fourth track also has dark overtones. "It Just Won't Quit", Steinman explains, "is about the fact that there are some things you never shake off... That's love, I guess." "Out of the Frying Pan (And into the Fire)" is a more upbeat song.

The album's sixth track, "Objects in the Rear View Mirror May Appear Closer Than They Are" is a three part narrative that uses pathetic fallacy, where the seasons (summer, winter and spring) reflect the atmosphere of the events being described, drawing "its inspiration from the singer's often-tragic childhood. The lyrics portray a man who has overcome tragedies in his life yet still feels haunted by their memory." Steinman says that it was "the hardest song to write and get across."

It's a very passionate song. It's really, I think maybe, the most passionate one on the record. I mean, I'm really proud of it because that's really one that goes over-the-top in the sense that it's got images—it has religious imagery of resurrection, it's got images of fertility and rebirth, it has really very good sexual images, images of cars—which I always like.

The track quotes lyrics from Bat Out of Hell's "Paradise by the Dashboard Light" ("It was long ago and it was far away"), as does the next track, "Wasted Youth", a spoken word fantasy monologue (a remixed version of "Love and Death and an American Guitar" from Steinman's Bad for Good album). The 1977 song's opening line "I remember every [...] little thing as if it happened only yesterday. I was barely seventeen" opens this track also, but instead of being "barely dressed" the protagonist "once killed a boy with a Fender guitar." Influenced by The Doors, Steinman wanted to write a piece where "the rhythm wasn't coming from the drums so much as the voice—the rhythm of the spoken voice and the heartbeat behind it."

According to Steinman, "Good Girls Go to Heaven (Bad Girls Go Everywhere)" is a "teenage prayer". "Lost Boys and Golden Girls" is "Steinman's interpretation of the story of Peter Pan." The composer says that Peter Pan has "always been about my favorite story and I've always looked at it from the perspective that it's a great rock and roll myth because it's about—when you get right down to it—it's about a gang of lost boys who never grow up, who are going to be young forever and that's about as perfect an image for rock'n'roll as I can think of."

== Cover and booklet ==
The cover art was illustrated by sci-fi/fantasy artist Michael Whelan, following the style of Richard Corben's cover for Bat Out of Hell. It features the biker from the first cover flying on his motorcycle towards a giant bat perched on top of New York City's Chrysler Building, to which an angel is bound. Echoing the gravestones of the first cover, partially destroyed skyscrapers inhabit the lava landscape. Also like the first album, it features a 'Songs by Jim Steinman' credit, although smaller and located at the bottom of the cover.

As well as providing thematic consistency with the original, the repetition of iconography also acted as a vital marketing tool. The marketing of the album was documented in an episode of the 1995 BBC television programme The Music Biz. Executives at Virgin Records thought that this was important to attract the target audience, who they believed no longer spent much time in record shops. They felt that similarities to the design of the first album, including Meat Loaf's name in Gothic typography, would entice consumers of the 1977 album to purchase this.

The booklet contains all of the lyrics to the songs, each accompanied by a small Whelan illustration, which were used as the respective single covers. There is a suggestion to "support Tibet House, an organization dedicated to the unique culture of the Tibetan people which has the potential to make a valuable contribution to the world at large".

There are two pressings of the actual disc art of the album. One version features the artwork from the front cover on it and another just features the album title and the artist name.

== Singles and videos ==
Three tracks from the album were released as singles. "I'd Do Anything for Love (But I Won't Do That)" became a worldwide #1 hit from this album. The song reached #1 in the charts in 28 countries. It spent seven weeks atop the UK Singles Chart, making it the most successful single in the UK that year. Simultaneously, Meat Loaf released "Bat Out of Hell" as a single, which also made the top ten in the United Kingdom. Meat Loaf remained the last artist to have two top-ten UK singles at the same time until the Manic Street Preachers in 2001.

"Rock and Roll Dreams Come Through" reached #13 on the Billboard Hot 100, #14 on the Cash Box Top 100 and #11 on the UK Singles Chart. The third single from the album, "Objects in the Rear View Mirror May Appear Closer Than They Are", did less well when it was released in 1994, reaching #38 on the Billboard Hot 100, #21 on the Cash Box Top 100 and #26 in the United Kingdom. "Life Is a Lemon" peaked at #17 on the Billboard Mainstream Rock Tracks chart in the United States.

Michael Bay directed three music videos from the album. "I'd Do Anything for Love" is based on Beauty and the Beast and The Phantom of the Opera. "Rock and Roll Dreams Come Through" features a runaway girl, played by Angelina Jolie. "Objects in the Rear View Mirror" illustrates the song's narrative. Featuring Robert Patrick, the video contained flying aircraft imagery that Bay would use in Armageddon and Pearl Harbor.

In 1994, the three films were released as the VHS tape Meat Loaf – Bat Out of Hell 2 – Picture Show, which also included alternate versions of "Paradise by the Dashboard Light", "Life Is a Lemon and I Want My Money Back" and "I'd Do Anything for Love", all featuring lead vocalist Patti Russo. They were included on a DVD in 2006 with the 'Collectors Edition' release of the album.

== Reception ==
Professional ratings
Review scores
Source	Rating
AllMusic	4.5/5 stars
Kerrang!	4/5 stars
Music Week	4/5 stars
NME	3/10
Q	4/5 stars
Rolling Stone	2/5 stars
The Rolling Stone Album Guide	1/5 stars

The album was a commercial hit, and has sold more than 14 million copies around the world. It was number one for one week in the US on the Billboard 200, the UK Albums Chart for eleven non-consecutive weeks, number one in Australia for four weeks, and eight weeks at number one in Canada. Meat Loaf won a Grammy Award for Best Solo Rock Vocal Performance for "I'd Do Anything for Love" and received two Brit Awards nominations (Best International Male and Best Selling Single).

Despite its huge commercial success, critical reception was mixed. The specialist music press were generally positive. Q magazine proclaimed, "truly this... is the genuine follow-up to the most over-the-top rock album of all time." Like most critics, Q referred to the excesses of Steinman's style, citing the length of the songs (Q says that "Objects..." running for 10 minutes and 12 seconds is "not necessary"). Unlike the original, where the epic loud songs were "offset by the softness of stuff like 'Two Out of Three Ain't Bad'...even the ballads are Roman orgies of sound and fury." This, they said, means "the album's probable theme—the crushing effect growing up has on teenage dreams—seems to get lost among the thud and blunder." Overall, though, Q was positive, concluding with the sentiment that "Ultimately, Back Into Hell may not trash its predecessor, but as a mad, crunching, stadium rock album, it's probably the best thing of its kind you'll hear this year."

Looking at how "Steinman's old-fashioned teen-dream rock 'n' roll fantasies" fits in with the music culture of 1993, Kerrang! suggested that it would not appeal to "Nirvana and Metallica fans, but there's an older generation of rockers out there who will, quite properly, worship this album." Their four-star review declared that "it is a work of genius, a ready made rock classic and arguably the last word in rock operas." In The Tip Sheet, Jonathan King labelled it a "glorious, splendid album", celebrating Meat Loaf's "operatically gorgeous" voice and Steinman's "superb" songs, arrangements and production. "You'll be blown away. Better still you'll catch yourself openly laughing out loud at times with delight. You know what to expect yet it's constantly better, fresher and brighter than you hope. If they had a Mercury Music Prize for American albums, this would win it hands down."

In a 1999 documentary celebrating the original album, Meat Loaf said that Bat Out of Hell polarized people: "Some hate it, and some worship it." The bombast did not meet some critics' approval. As with the first album, Rolling Stone gave the album a mixed review. They called it "harmless, low-octane operatic drivel" with "insufferably long Steinman compositions with equally long names". Non-specialist publications gave the most negative reviews. The Fort Worth Star-Telegram also referred to the length of the songs, in which they said Steinman "vomits up 75 minutes of endlessly repeated choruses". The newspaper branded it "the worst pop album of 1993". The Des Moines Register thought that the album was "wallowing in excess so gratuitous as to make Michael Bolton, by comparison, seem a master of understatement... Mountains of banshee-like wailing guitars! Thunderous drums! Herniated vocals! Profoundly stupid lyrics! Gack. This isn't pandering to the lowest common denominator—it's lowering the lowest common denominator."

Like the original, retrospective reviews have been appreciative. AllMusic appreciated the bombast and "the pseudo-operatic splendor of Jim Steinman's grandly cinematic songs." Responding to concerns about length and overstatement, they replied, "that's precisely the point of this album, and is also why it works so well. No other rock 'n' roller besides Meat Loaf could pull off the humor and theatricality of Back Into Hell and make it seem real. In that sense, it's a worthy successor to the original."

== Track listing ==
=== Original release ===
All tracks are written by Jim Steinman.

No.	Title	Vocals	Length
1.	"I'd Do Anything for Love (But I Won't Do That)"	uncredited guest vocals by Lorraine Crosby	12:01
2.	"Life Is a Lemon and I Want My Money Back"		8:00
3.	"Rock and Roll Dreams Come Through"		5:51
4.	"It Just Won't Quit"		7:21
5.	"Out of the Frying Pan (and into the Fire)"		7:24
6.	"Objects in the Rear View Mirror May Appear Closer than They Are"		10:16
7.	"Wasted Youth"	Steinman	2:41
8.	"Everything Louder than Everything Else"		8:00
9.	"Good Girls Go to Heaven (Bad Girls Go Everywhere)"		6:53
10.	"Back into Hell"		2:46
11.	"Lost Boys and Golden Girls"		4:20
Total length:			75:38

=== Other versions ===
==== 1993 special limited edition ====
Alongside the original version a two-disc special edition was released, containing a foldout poster and a bonus disc containing three live tracks, which can also be found as B-sides to the "I'd Do Anything for Love (But I Won't Do That)" singles.

Disc two
No.	Title	Length
1.	"Bat Out of Hell"	12:11
2.	"You Took the Words Right Out of My Mouth"	6:42
3.	"Everything Louder than Everything Else"	9:19
Total length:		28:12

This was produced by Meat Loaf and recorded and mixed by David Thoener. It was recorded in New York, NY in July 1993.

==== 2002 deluxe edition ====
A two-disc "deluxe edition" was released by MCA on June 25, 2002. The first disc contains the remastered original album, while the second contains several radio edits and remixes. It was presented as a foldout double-disc set housed in a slipcase, with an extensive booklet with liner notes and rare photographs. AllMusic suggest that although the album deserves the attention, "the extra disc of material is [not] worth the time of anyone outside of fanatics... it doesn't really offer any revelations, curiosities, or an interesting listen for anybody else (and it may not be that interesting to those collectors, either)."

Disc two
No.	Title	Length
1.	"Objects in the Rear View Mirror May Appear Closer Than They Are" (Radio edit)	5:01
2.	"I'd Do Anything for Love (But I Won't Do That)" (Single edit)	5:25
3.	"Rock and Roll Dreams Come Through" (Radio edit)	4:00
4.	"Life Is a Lemon and I Want My Money Back" (Radio edit)	4:46
5.	"Objects in the Rear View Mirror May Appear Closer Than They Are" (Wild Bomb mix)	6:01
6.	"I'd Do Anything for Love (But I Won't Do That)" (Longer, but still not as long as the album cut)	7:52
7.	"Life Is a Lemon and I Want My Money Back" (Ty Cobb mix)	5:52
8.	"Objects in the Rear View Mirror May Appear Closer Than They Are" (Wild Car mix)	7:40
9.	"Rock and Roll Dreams Come Through" (Knute Rockne edit)	5:28
10.	"Life Is a Lemon and I Want My Money Back" (1998 remix)	8:07
Total length:		60:12

==== 2006 2CD/1DVD collector's edition ====
In 2006, a three-disc collector's edition was released by Virgin/EMI. The first disc contains the original album remastered and the second a live version of the original Bat Out of Hell album plus "I'd Do Anything for Love (But I Won't Do That)", compiled from the various B-sides from the album's singles.

The tracks were recorded live in New York during July 1993, except "For Crying Out Loud" which was recorded live in the United States in 1994. Live arrangements by Meat Loaf and the Neverland Express featuring Patti Russo as lead female vocalist. Tracks 1–6 and 8 were recorded and mixed by David Thoener, and the audio was remastered by Peter Mew with Nigel Reeve at Abbey Road Studios, London.

The final disc is a DVD containing all three of the Michael Bay videos, and a featurette with an interview with Meat Loaf and Steinman, with behind the scenes footage from the video shoot of "I'd Do Anything for Love".

Disc two
No.	Title	Length
1.	"Bat Out of Hell"	11:13
2.	"You Took the Words Right Out of My Mouth"	6:35
3.	"Heaven Can Wait"	4:48
4.	"All Revved Up and No Place to Go"	7:55
5.	"Two Out of Three Ain't Bad"	7:38
6.	"Paradise by the Dashboard Light"	11:27
7.	"For Crying Out Loud"	9:51
8.	"I'd Do Anything for Love (But I Won't Do That)"	12:44
Total length:		72:11

All sections were directed by Michael Bay and produced by Propaganda Films. DVD produced by Abbey Road Interactive.

DVD track listing
No.	Title	Length
1.	"To Hell and Back: Meat Loaf and Jim Steinman Interview"	9:22
2.	"I'd Do Anything for Love (But I Won't Do That)"	7:40
3.	"Rock and Roll Dreams Come Through"	5:47
4.	"Objects in the Rear View Mirror May Appear Closer Than They Are"	7:43
Total length:		30:32

== Personnel ==
=== Arrangements ===
- Jim Steinman – arranger
- "Meat Loaf and the musicians" – co-arranger
- Todd Rundgren – background vocal arranger

=== Band on live tracks ===
- Mark Alexander – piano, backing vocals
- Steve Buslowe – bass guitar, backing vocals
- John Miceli – drums
- Patti Russo – female lead vocals, backing vocals
- Kasim Sulton – guitar, keyboards, backing vocals
- Pat Thrall – lead guitar, backing vocals

=== Band on studio tracks ===
- Kenny Aronoff – drums
- Roy Bittan – piano, keyboards
- Jeff Bova – organ (8), synthesizer, programming
- Jimmy Bralower – drums (9)
- Steve Buslowe – bass guitar
- Robert Coron – additional backing vocals (2)
- Lorraine Crosby – female lead vocals (1, as "Mrs. Loud"), backing vocals (2, 6), additional backing vocals (8)
- Brett Cullen – additional backing vocals (2)
- Rory Dodd – additional vocals (6), backing vocals (1–5, 9, 11)
- Stuart Emerson – backing vocals (2, 6)
- Ellen Foley – additional vocals (6)
- Cynthia Geary – additional backing vocals (2)
- Amy Goff – backing vocals (2), additional backing vocals (9)
- Elaine Goff – backing vocals (2), additional backing vocals (9)
- Max Haskett – backing vocals (6, 8)
- Curtis King – backing vocals (9)
- Michelle Little – additional backing vocals (2)
- Rick Marotta – drums (6, 8)
- Eddie Martinez – guitar (1, 2, 6, 8, 9)
- Brian Meagher – bagpipes (8), drums (8)
- Brian Meagher Jr. – bagpipes (8), drums (8)
- Justin Meagher – bagpipes (8), drums (8)
- Meat Loaf – lead vocals, backing vocals (2, 4)
- Gunnar Nelson – backing vocals (2)
- Matthew Nelson – backing vocals (2)
- Bill Payne – piano (6, 8, 11)
- Lenny Pickett – saxophone (3, 9)
- Tim Pierce – guitar (1–5)
- Todd Rundgren – backing vocals (1–6, 8, 9)
- Jim Steinman – spoken word (7), additional backing vocals (2)
- Kasim Sulton – backing vocals
- Pat Thrall – guitar (4, 5)
- Eric Troyer – backing vocals (11)

== Charts ==
=== Weekly charts ===
Initial chart performance for Bat Out of Hell II: Back into Hell
Chart (1993–94)	Peak position
Australian Albums (ARIA)	1
Austrian Albums (Ö3 Austria)	1
Canadian Albums (RPM)	1
Dutch Albums (Album Top 100)	1
German Albums (Offizielle Top 100)	1
Hungarian Albums (MAHASZ)	14
New Zealand Albums (RMNZ)	1
Norwegian Albums (VG-lista)	2
Scottish Albums (Official Charts)	11
Swedish Albums (Sverigetopplistan)	1
Swiss Albums (Schweizer Hitparade)	1
UK Albums (Official Charts)	1
US Billboard 200	1

Weekly chart performance for Bat Out of Hell II: Back into Hell following Meat Loaf's death
Chart (2022)	Peak position
Belgian Albums (Ultratop Flanders)	102
Canadian Albums (Billboard)	57
US Top Rock Albums (Billboard)	10

=== Year-end charts ===
1993 year-end chart performance for Bat Out of Hell II: Back into Hell
Chart (1993)	Position
Australian Albums (ARIA)	3
Canadian Albums (RPM)	7
Dutch Albums (Album Top 100)	40
German Albums (Offizielle Top 100)	15
New Zealand Albums (RMNZ)	10
Swiss Albums (Schweizer Hitparade)	32
UK Albums (OCC)	1
US Billboard 200	50

1994 year-end chart performance for Bat Out of Hell II: Back into Hell
Chart (1994)	Position
Australian Albums (ARIA)	42
Austrian Albums (Ö3 Austria)	16
Canadian Albums (RPM)	19
French Albums (IFOP)	95
German Albums (Offizielle Top 100)	8
New Zealand Albums (RMNZ)	42
Swiss Albums (Schweizer Hitparade)	16
US Billboard 200	9

=== Decade-end charts ===
Chart (1990–1999)	Rank
US Billboard 200	87

== Certifications and sales ==
Certifications and sales for Bat Out of Hell II: Back into Hell
Region	Certification	Certified units/sales
Australia (ARIA)	4× Platinum	280,000^{^}
Austria (IFPI Austria)	Platinum	50,000^{*}
Canada (Music Canada)	9× Platinum	900,000^{^}
Germany (BVMI)	2× Platinum	1,000,000^{^}
Ireland	—	45,000
Netherlands (NVPI)	Platinum	100,000^{^}
New Zealand (RMNZ)	Platinum	15,000^{^}
Sweden (GLF)	Platinum	122,000
Switzerland (IFPI Switzerland)	Platinum	50,000^{^}
United Kingdom (BPI)	6× Platinum	1,800,000^{^}
United States (RIAA)	5× Platinum	5,000,000^{^}
Summaries
Europe (IFPI)	2× Platinum	2,700,000
^{*} Sales figures based on certification alone.^{^} Shipments figures based on certification alone.
