= Concert at the Kings =

Annual concert in Wiltshire, England

Concert at the Kings is an annual concert which takes place in the field to the rear of the Kings Arms pub in All Cannings near Devizes in Wiltshire, England.

Usually held in May, it is a charitable fundraiser for cancer charities and to date it has raised over £250,000 for Macmillan Cancer Support, Above And Beyond, and Hope For Tomorrow among many others.

The first concert took place in 2012, and since its inception acts such as 10cc, The Boomtown Rats, Squeeze, SAS Band, Steve Harley, Sweet and Los Pacaminos have performed at the Kings Arms. 2016 saw Marmalade, Big Country, 10cc, Suzy Quatro and the SAS Band take to the stage.

Concert founders John Callis and Andy Scott are cancer survivors, and Concert at the Kings is their way of helping cancer victims across South West England to get the support they deserve. The 2018 concert raised money for Salisbury District Hospital's STARS appeal, in particular the Pembroke Unit which is the specialist treatment centre for people with cancer and blood diseases from across south Wiltshire, north and east Dorset and west Hampshire.

The final Concert at the Kings took place in 2021.

== History of performing acts ==
=== 2012 ===
The SAS Band, Brian May & Kerry Ellis, Mike & The Mechanics, Madeline Bell, Midge Ure, Tom Robinson, Chris Thompson, Patti Russo, Fabbagirls, Sweet, The Strawbs, The Dave Kelly Blues Band

=== 2013 ===
1st Act – Dozy, Beaky, Mick & Titch, 2nd Act – Georgie Fame, 3rd Act – The Blues Band, 4th Act – Dr. Feelgood, 5th Act – 10CC, 6th Act – The SAS Band ft. Roger Taylor (Queen) & Jeff Beck

=== 2014 ===
1st Act Main Stage – The Troggs, 2nd Act Main Stage – Los Pacaminos, 3rd Act Main Stage – Steve Harley & Cockney Rebel, 4th Act Main Stage – The Straits, 5th Act Main Stage – The Boomtown Rats

1st Act Second Stage – Jake Meeking, 2nd Act Second Stage – The Greasy Slicks, 3rd Act Second Stage – Funkin Skunks

=== 2015 ===
1st Act Main Stage – Animals & Friends, 2nd Act Main Stage – Howard Jones, 3rd Act Main Stage – Sweet, 4th Act Main Stage – Lindisfarne, 5th Act Main Stage – Squeeze

1st Act Second Stage – Lauren Thalia, 2nd Act Second Stage – Nellie Bell, 3rd Act Second Stage – Drench, 4th Act Second Stage – Bad Sounds, 5th Act Second Stage – Idlewood

=== 2016 ===
1st Act Main Stage – Marmalade, 2nd Act Main Stage – Big Country, 3rd Act Main Stage – 10CC, 4th Act Main Stage – Suzi Quatro, 5th Act Main Stage – The SAS Band

1st Act Second Stage – Haydn & Bee, 2nd Act Second Stage – Phoenix Club, 3rd Act Second Stage – Jake Meeking, 4th Act Second Stage – True Heights

=== 2017 ===
Main Stage: John Coghlan's Quo, Gerry & the Pacemakers, Wilko Johnson, Sweet, Alison Moyet, Paul "Wix" Wickens' All Star Band with Robbie McIntosh, Hamish Stuart and Gary Brooker

CATK stage: Verdisa, Invisible Vegas, Bite the Buffalo

=== 2018 ===
Main Stage: Animals & Friends, John Coghlan's Quo, The Stranglers, From The Jam, Paul Carrack, Billy Ocean

CATK stage: Sam Brockington, Meeking, Digital Criminals, John Coghlan's Quo, Novatines (with special guest: Andy Scott)

=== 2021 ===
Billy Ocean; 10cc; SAS band with special guests Roger Taylor, Midge Ure, Roachford, Madeline Bell; Steve Harley & Cockney Rebel; Sweet; Lindisfarne; Strawbs Electric; Novatines; Meeking; Sam Brockington; Verdisa; Talk in Code; Humdinger.

== Acoustic at the Kings ==
The first 'Acoustic At The Kings' event took place at The Kings Arms on Monday 28 August 2017, with Verdisa playing an acoustic set in the Breeze Shed.
