= Is Nothing Sacred =

Single by Meat Loaf
- Released: 1999
- Genre: Rock
- Label: Virgin & Sony Music TV
- Songwriters: Jim Steinman and Don Black
- Producer: Russ Titelman

Meat Loaf singles chronology
"A Kiss Is a Terrible Thing to Waste" (1998)	"Is Nothing Sacred" (1999)	"Did I Say That?" (2003)

"Is Nothing Sacred" is a song written by Jim Steinman and Don Black. Jim Steinman composed the music while Don Black wrote the lyrics to this ballad. The song was originally recorded for the 1995 album Welcome to the Neighbourhood. A longer version was included on the 1998 album The Very Best of Meat Loaf, with lead vocals by Meat Loaf. It was re-recorded as a duet featuring Patti Russo for its single release in 1999. The duet debuted at #15 on the UK charts. The duet is also featured as a bonus track on the VH1: Storytellers album. Meat Loaf and Patti Russo performed this song nightly on The Very Best Of tour. The music video for the single was released in April 1999 and featured Meat Loaf and Patti Russo performing with an orchestra.

Russell Watson has released a cover of the song. Celine Dion, Karine Hannah, and Rob Evan as part of The Dream Engine have all provided lead vocals for unreleased recordings of this song.
