= Objects in the Rear View Mirror May Appear Closer Than They Are =

1993 song by Meat Loaf

Single by Meat Loaf

from the album Bat Out of Hell II: Back into Hell
- B-side: "Two Out of Three Ain't Bad" (live) (North America); "Rock and Roll Dreams Come Through" (live) (Europe)
- Released: April 25, 1994
- Studio: Ocean Way Recording (Los Angeles)
- Length: 10:15 (main version); 5:55 (single edit)
- Label: MCA (North America); Virgin (worldwide)
- Songwriter: Jim Steinman
- Producer: Jim Steinman

Meat Loaf singles chronology
"Rock and Roll Dreams Come Through" (1994)	"Objects in the Rear View Mirror May Appear Closer Than They Are" (1994)	"I'd Lie for You" (1995)

Music video
- "Objects in the Rear View Mirror May Appear Closer Than They Are" on YouTube

"Objects in the Rear View Mirror May Appear Closer Than They Are" is a song composed and written by Jim Steinman, and recorded by American singer and actor Meat Loaf. The song was released in April 1994, by MCA and Virgin Records, as the third single from his sixth album, Bat Out of Hell II: Back into Hell (1993). It reached numbers 21 and 38 on the US Cash Box Top 100 and Billboard Hot 100 charts, and number 26 in the UK Top 40. With its chart success, the song became the hit with the longest un-bracketed title at 52 characters as of 2007. The title is derived from the safety warning on car side mirrors in the US, "Objects in mirror are closer than they appear". Its accompanying music video was directed by Michael Bay and filmed in Texas, featuring actors Robert Patrick and Will Estes.

Parts of the melody were adapted from Steinman's earlier tune "Surf's Up", which appears on Steinman's solo album Bad for Good. Steinman later reused the melody, with new lyrics by Michael Kunze, for "Die Unstillbare Gier", a song in the Tanz der Vampire productions, and for "Confession of a Vampire" in the ill-fated US version (Dance of the Vampires).

== Music and lyric ==
"Objects in the Rear View Mirror May Appear Closer Than They Are" is a three-part narrative, centred upon the seasons summer, winter and spring. Time describes the singer as "haunted by three pushy ghosts : a friend, a father, a long lost love." According to AllMusic, the song draws "its inspiration from the singer's often-tragic childhood. The lyric portrays a man who has overcome tragedies in his life yet still feels haunted by their memory." BBC.co.uk also says that the song about a "melancholy middle-aged man reminiscing about his youth... is in many ways uncomfortably close to home, dealing as it does with episodes uncannily similar to events in his own life." Steinman says it was "the hardest song to write and get across".

It's a very passionate song. It's really, I think maybe, the most passionate one on the record. I mean, I'm really proud of it because that's really one that goes over the top in the sense that it's got images – it has religious imagery of resurrection, it's got images of fertility and rebirth, it has really very good sexual images, images of cars – which I always like.

During interviews in later years, Meat Loaf rejected the notion that the song was based on his own life. Writing for Investigate magazine, Ian Wishart "recalls seeing a video years ago where he [Meat Loaf] talked of the abuse he suffered at the hands of his drunken father, and he has written of the time his father even tried to kill him with a knife. To me, and others, it sounded spookily similar to aspects of... 'Objects'". Meat Loaf soundly refuted the proposition: "No, not a prayer, I wouldn't allow it. ... That's like if an artist painted a picture of a place he'd never seen before that he couldn't bring any truth to that because he has no point of reference--no, he does have a point of reference, his truth is the point of reference is and that's what the point of reference is. That's what any kind of artistic endeavour should have, is always finding the truth."

AllMusic says "the music takes the concept of a power ballad to epic heights: the verses build from somber softness to piercing heights of drama before giving way to a chorus that releases the tension with a meditative melodic figure that underlines the hypnotically-repeated title in a soothing fashion." Music journalist Mick Wall labels the track "perhaps the most sober and reflective song Steinman has ever written." Wall comments how the song begins about two best friends who lose each other tragically.

The first verse is set in summer, when "the skies were pure and the fields were green." The vocalist describes his close friendship with his best friend, who dies prematurely in a crash. Although Kenny has died, the vocalist reveals how his memory lives on:

There are times I think I see him peeling out of the dark
I think he's right behind me now and he's gaining ground

"And it was long ago and it was far away..."
The end of the verse leading into the chorus, with the title line.

Each verse concludes by declaring that the preceding events "were long ago and ... far away", a line which Mick Wall says summons "up the lost spirit of 1977, echoing "Paradise by the Dashboard Light", the vocal melody a tip of the hat to "Surf's Up".

The second verse is darker in tone. The season is winter, when "dreams would freeze," and the sun has "descended." The lyrics document a physically abusive "dangerous and drunk" father, reflecting Meat Loaf's real life youth. Like the first verse, the memories of the past still affect the present.

And though the nightmares should be over
Some of the terrors are still intact
I'll hear that ugly coarse and violent voice
And then he grabs me from behind and then he pulls me back

Again, the title is repeated several times, softly at first, building into a more dramatic intensity. Allmusic says it starts "with gentle piano and synthesizer licks that are built up with power chords to enhance their drama and weaving stirring, choir-styled backing vocals into the chorus that keep its repetition fresh by giving it new layers." An instrumental piano and guitar section bridges the second and third verses. The "choir-styled" wordless background vocals were arranged by Todd Rundgren. Guitar is gradually given more emphasis in the mix as the band plays the melody of the verse, concluding with the instrumental of the opening line of the verse.

The third verse describes "a beauty living on the edge of town" and a seemingly intense sexual relationship. However, their relationship ends. Conforming to the structure of the song, and its title, her memory is still present.

She used her body just like a bandage;
She used my body just like a wound
I'll probably never know where she disappeared
But I can see her rising up out of the back seat now
Just like an angel rising up from a tomb

After the title line is repeated twelve times, with growing volume and intensity, the vocalist quietly repeats the first four lines of the above.

== Single release and reception ==
The song was the third track from Bat Out of Hell II: Back into Hell released as a single. It reached number 38 on the US Billboard Hot 100, and number 26 on the UK Singles Chart and Canada's RPM Top Singles chart. On the latter chart, it stayed at that position for four weeks. In Australia, the single peaked at number 52 in June 1994. The UK Virgin release also featured two tracks performed live in New York City in July 1993: "All Revved Up with No Place to Go" and "Two Out of Three Ain't Bad." Other versions included live renditions of "Rock and Roll Dreams Come Through", "Masculine" and his cover of "Roll Over Beethoven". Like the album and other singles from Bat II, the artwork for the cover was by Michael Whelan. The graphic also appears alongside the song's lyrics in the album's booklet.

The length and narrative led Q magazine to call the song a "near-Springsteen parody ballad." It remains a major favorite with Meat Loaf's fans thanks to its autobiographical quality. When Meat Loaf performed the song at the Royal Albert Hall in London in October 2006, one reviewer called the "little known but well loved song" a "showstopper."

The song was specified in some of the album's negative reviews, mainly its length and the repetition of the title line. Writing for Rolling Stone, Matt Birkbeck referred to the songs, naming "Objects", as "harmless, low-octane operatic drivel" with "insufferably long Steinman compositions with equally long names." The Fort Worth Star-Telegram also referred to the length of the songs on the album, in which Steinman "vomits up 75 minutes of endlessly repeated choruses." The New Statesman's Kate Mossman labels Steinman's lyrics "unwieldy". Alan Jones from Music Week gave the song three out of five, viewing it as "more melodramatic overkill" from Meat Loaf. In a positive review, Larry Flick from Billboard magazine named it "a radio-friendly and concise power ballad that goes straight for the heartstrings." Mark Frith from Smash Hits gave it four out of five, complimenting it as yet "another over-blown bit of excellent pomp rock."

Meat Loaf performed the song on the April 14, 1994, edition of the BBC television show Top of the Pops. Live versions of the song were included on the 1996 Live Around the World album and the 2007 3 Bats Live DVD. The Dream Engine performed the song at the Over the Top concerts at Mohegan Sun: this arrangement had the second verse being performed by a female vocalist. Steinman reused the melody, with new lyrics by Michael Kunze, for "Die Unstillbare Gier", a song performed by the character Graf von Krolock in the rock-opera Tanz der Vampire. Steve Barton performed the song on the 1998 Original Vienna Cast Recording. Steinman rewrote the Tanz version into English as "Confession of a Vampire" for the ill-fated US version (Dance of the Vampires) of the musical starring Michael Crawford.

== Music video ==
American director Michael Bay for Propaganda Films directed the music video of "Objects in the Rear View Mirror May Appear Closer Than They Are". He had previously directed the videos for the album's prior two singles, "I'd Do Anything for Love (But I Won't Do That)" and "Rock and Roll Dreams Come Through". Allen Daviau served as the cinematographer.

The music video has overlapping features so that it looks like that the actors are ghost-like, appearing and disappearing. The length of the music video is 7:42, compared to the 10:15 single version. Actors include Robert Patrick as Kenny's father, Greg Trock as Kenny, Will Estes as the grieving friend (young Meat Loaf), Joshua Diaz as the childhood iteration of Meat Loaf, and an unidentified model as "The Beauty on the Edge of Town".

Filming took place in and around Denton, Texas. Several parts were shot in Slidell, Texas on a large ranch. The scene with the "beauty at the edge of town" washing her car was filmed in Valley View, Texas, near to the Oklahoma border.

=== Plot ===
The video opens with Kenny playing with his friend (Josh Diaz), and his father (Robert Patrick) letting them sit in his airplane. A little older, Kenny takes the plane for a ride. His father runs outside just in time to see Kenny lose control of the aircraft, crash and killed ("They said he crashed and burned"). The firefighters extinguish the fire from the wreckage and an ambulance takes away the body.

Meat Loaf and Will Estes in the music video, showing some of the style of cinematography.

In the second section of the song, the protagonist (Will Estes) sees the ghost of the plane fly over the graveyard at Kenny's funeral. Synchronic with the lyrics relating to "winter" ("freeze"; "no leaves on the trees") in this verse, some of the mise-en-scene is minimal. It shows his father as a family man during the day but an abusive alcoholic all the time. The line "He hit me again, and again, and again" is accompanied by a baseball scene, rather than visually depicting the violence of "hit" that the autobiographical elements suggest.

He runs away trying to regain his freedom ("I had to run away alone... my life became my own"). He then meets an older woman who teaches him everything "about the mystery and the muscle of love." A risqué sequence of them engaging in sexual activity in the back of a car matches the lyrics ("She used her body just like a bandage/She used my body just like a wound").

At the end of the video, whenever Meat Loaf sings the line "Objects in the Rear View Mirror May Appear Closer Than They Are", he sees either the ghost of the plane, the woman or himself when he was younger. As with the lyrics, the sequence depicts how, as Allmusic says, "he still feels haunted by their memory."

== Personnel ==
- Meat Loaf – lead vocals
- Bill Payne – piano
- Eddie Martinez – guitars
- Rick Marotta – drums
- Steve Buslowe – bass
- Jeff Bova – synthesizer, programming
- Todd Rundgren, Kasim Sulton, Max Haskett, Lorraine Crosby, Stuart Emerson – background vocals
- Ellen Foley, Rory Dodd – additional vocals

== Charts ==
Weekly chart performance for "Objects"
Chart (1994)	Peak position
Australia (ARIA)	52
Canada Top Singles (RPM)	26
Europe (Eurochart Hot 100)	50
Germany (GfK)	90
Iceland (Íslenski Listinn Topp 40)	20
New Zealand (Recorded Music NZ)	32
Scottish Singles Sales (Official Charts)	69
UK Singles (Official Charts)	26
UK Airplay (Music Week)	39
US Billboard Hot 100	38
US Pop Airplay (Billboard)	29
US Cash Box Top 100	21

== Release history ==
Release dates and formats for "Objects"
Region	Date	Format(s)	Label(s)	Ref.
United Kingdom	April 25, 1994	7-inch vinyl; cassette	Virgin	
United Kingdom	May 2, 1994	CD	Virgin	
Australia	May 30, 1994	CD; cassette	Virgin	
