= Paradise by the Dashboard Light =

1977 single by Meat Loaf and Ellen Foley

- Side-A label of U.S. 7-inch vinyl single

Single by Meat Loaf and Ellen Foley

from the album Bat Out of Hell
- B-side: "Bat Overture"
- Released: August 1978 (US); October 23, 1978 (Aus)
- Recorded: 1976
- Studio: Bearsville (Woodstock, New York)
- Genre: Glam rock; hard rock; rock and roll; progressive rock
- Length: 8:28 (album version); 7:55 (single edit); 6:58 (without baseball play-by-play); 5:32 (Dutch and promotional single edits)
- Label: Epic
- Songwriter: Jim Steinman
- Producer: Todd Rundgren

Meat Loaf and Ellen Foley singles chronology
| "Two Out of Three Ain't Bad" (1978) | "Paradise by the Dashboard Light" (1978) | "Bat Out of Hell" (1979) |

Music video
- Video on YouTube

"Paradise by the Dashboard Light" is a song written by Jim Steinman. It was released in 1977 on the album Bat Out of Hell, with vocals by American musicians Meat Loaf and Ellen Foley. An uncommonly long song for a single, it has become a staple of classic rock radio and has been described as the "greatest rock duet".

== Background ==
"Paradise by the Dashboard Light" was one of seven songs developed for Bat Out of Hell, with the first three songs having originated from Steinman's Peter Pan-based rock musical, Neverland. Steinman, Meat Loaf, and Ellen Foley (who had been cast as Wendy in Neverland) had all worked together on the National Lampoon Road Tour, where the singers had a history of performing over-the-top musical comedy sketches together.

After numerous failed attempts by Steinman and Meat Loaf to secure record label support for the album, Mark "Moogy" Klingman brought the project to the attention of Utopia bandmate Todd Rundgren for potential production work. Under the impression that the album had the support of RCA subsidiary Utopia Records, Rundgren agreed to produce at Bearsville Studios near Woodstock, New York, where he was working as an engineer and producer. But Rundgren discovered that the Utopia Records deal did not exist and he was essentially paying for the album's production himself. Rundgren offered Albert Grossman, founder of Bearsville Studios and the Bearsville Records label, the right of first refusal.

Both Steinman and Rundgren were influenced by Phil Spector and his "Wall of Sound", and Rundgren crafted arrangements translated from Steinman's vision of what the song should be. Jim Steinman had stated that he wanted to write "the ultimate car/sex song in which everything goes horribly wrong in the end."

== Composition ==
The song is divided into four parts:

=== Part 1: Paradise ===
The song opens with a male and female character reminiscing about days as a young high school couple on a date. They are parking by a lake and having fun, experiencing "paradise by the dashboard light", until the young male character insists they're "gonna go all the way tonight".

=== Part 2: Baseball broadcast ===
The male character's advances are mirrored by New York Yankees announcer Phil Rizzuto broadcasting a portion of a baseball game that serves as a metaphor for the male character's attempts to achieve his goal, accompanied by funk instrumentation and back-and-forth dialog between the male and female characters.

=== Part 3: Let Me Sleep On It ===
Just as the couple is about to consummate, the female character suddenly sings "Stop right there!" She refuses to go any further unless the male character first promises to love her forever and marry her. Reluctant to make such a long-term commitment, the male character repeatedly asks her to consent and promises to give his answer in the morning. The female character remains steadfast, and the male character finally offers his promise: "I started swearing to my God and on my mother's grave/That I would love you 'til the end of time".

=== Part 4: Praying For the End of Time ===
Back in the present, both characters express how each can no longer stand the other. Remaining true to the vow he made on that night in the past, he is now "praying for the end of time" to arrive and relieve him from his obligation. The song gradually fades out, juxtaposing his gloomy "it was long ago, it was far away, it was so much better than it is today!" with her nostalgic "it never felt so good, it never felt so right, we were glowing like the metal on the edge of a knife".

In early live performances of the song, this part was followed by a spoken-word epilogue in which the two characters, presumably having been married for a number of years, argued about what to keep after the couple's divorce. The argument was cut short by the female shouting "...And I'll keep the baby!", which left Meat Loaf's character, previously unaware of the pregnancy, speechless; immediately after, he ended the argument by screaming incoherently at her. The exchange was repeated with different female vocalists, in different versions and with different endings, in most of Meat Loaf's subsequent live tours and remained in the set until his death, when it was still occasionally performed by Meat Loaf and his featured vocalist Patti Russo.

== Production ==
After 10 days of rehearsals, the song was recorded at Bearsville Studios, with Meat Loaf and Ellen Foley providing vocals, producer Todd Rundgren playing guitar, Rundgren's Utopia bandmates Kasim Sulton on bass and Roger Powell on synthesizer, and Roy Bittan and Max Weinberg of Bruce Springsteen's E Street Band on piano and drums, respectively. Foley recorded her singing part in one take.

The baseball play-by-play section, written specifically for New York Yankees announcer Phil Rizzuto using phrases he would actually say while announcing, was recorded by Rizzuto with Steinman and Rundgren at The Hit Factory in New York in 1976. Rizzuto publicly maintained he was unaware that his contribution would be equated with sex in the finished song. However, Meat Loaf asserts that Rizzuto was fully aware of the context of what he was recording, and feigned ignorance only to stifle criticism.

Meat Loaf felt that Rundgren's initial mix of "Paradise by the Dashboard Light" rendered the song unsuitable for inclusion on the album. After several attempts by several people, John Jansen mixed the version of "Paradise by the Dashboard Light" included on the album.

== Distribution and release ==
Upon hearing the finished album, Albert Grossman at Bearsville Records turned it down, but E Street band member Steven Van Zandt contacted Steve Popovich, who accepted Bat Out Of Hell for his own Epic Records subsidiary, Cleveland International Records.

"Paradise by the Dashboard Light" was the third single released from Bat Out of Hell, 10 months after the album's release, following "You Took the Words Right Out of My Mouth" and "Two Out of Three Ain't Bad". In October 1978, after the success of "Paradise by the Dashboard Light," "You Took the Words Right Out of My Mouth" was re-released with "Paradise by the Dashboard Light" as the B-side, with this release peaking at No. 39 on the Billboard Hot 100 chart.

== Length ==
Even though the version of "Paradise by the Dashboard Light" released as a single was shortened from the 8:28 album version to 7:55, it is one of the longest songs to be released uncut on one side of a 7-inch 45 rpm record. The only difference between the version on the album and the full version released as a single is that the single version fades out almost immediately after the final line is sung. In some countries, a shorter 5:32 edit was released. The largest change is the complete removal of the "baseball play-by-play" section.

According to Meat Loaf on VH1 Storytellers, the original length of the track was to be 27 minutes.

== Music video ==
Meat Loaf persuaded the label to give him US$30,000 (equivalent to about $170,000 in 2025) to produce films of live-on-soundstage performances of three of the songs from Bat Out of Hell, including "Paradise by the Dashboard Light". Ellen Foley, who sang on the album, declined to be on the Bat Out Of Hell tour, and Karla DeVito assumed live performance responsibilities, so the music video was created by syncing the video of DeVito's performance to the audio of Foley's vocals. 35mm prints of these films were distributed to movie theaters holding midnight screenings of The Rocky Horror Picture Show, as a short subject to play before the feature (in which Meat Loaf appeared). Very few of these prints are still extant and/or in playable condition.

The Old Grey Whistle Test broadcast the Bat Out of Hell promotional film, and audience response was such that they showed the film again the following week. Meat Loaf was invited to perform live on the show with the Neverland Express, and he and Karla DeVito's February 1978 performance of "Paradise By the Dashboard Light" would become one of the show's benchmark performances.

The video became a staple on MTV in the network's early years. Rundgren speculated in a 2017 Billboard interview that the length of the song's video (the longest music video available at the time) made it ideal for VJs to play when they needed extra time between songs.

In the original video as released to television and in 35mm prints, the male/female "Hot Summer Night" prologue from "You Took the Words Right Out of My Mouth" was spoken live by Jim Steinman and Karla DeVito before the song performance. On the Hits Out of Hell music video compilation, the prologue was removed and spliced in front of the video for "You Took the Words Right Out of My Mouth", ostensibly to properly replicate the album Bat Out of Hell, and the video for "Paradise by the Dashboard Light" goes right into the performance.

== Reception ==
The single had modest success in the United States, peaking at number 39 on the Billboard Hot 100 on September 23, 1978, and remaining on the chart for 10 weeks. In the Netherlands, the single became Meat Loaf's biggest all-time hit, reaching number one at the end of 1978, going on to be a hit there again in 1988. In Belgium, the single stalled at number 2 where it stayed for 5 weeks, being blocked from the number 1 position the whole time by the Village People's "Y.M.C.A.". In various Dutch all-time charts, such as the Radio 2 Top 2000 or Radio Veronica's All Time Top 1000, the song consistently charts inside the top 30. In the United Kingdom, the song did not chart at all, but is well known and is a classic rock staple.

Cash Box said that "Ellen Foley offers an excellent foil to Meat Loaf's romantic foibles." Record World said that it has a boogie woogie beat and is "heavier and longer than" Meat Loaf's previous single "Two Out of Three Ain't Bad."

In an interview with Foley after Meat Loaf's death in 2022, Chris Willman of Variety described the song as "rock's greatest duet" and potentially "the greatest duet ever recorded". Foley replied that the song was "pretty close behind" "Up Where We Belong" by Jennifer Warnes and Joe Cocker.

== Personnel ==
- Meat Loaf - male lead vocals, backing vocals (as Marvin Lee)
- Ellen Foley - female lead vocals, backing vocals // music video: Karla DeVito
- Todd Rundgren - guitar, backing vocals
- Kasim Sulton - bass guitar
- Roy Bittan - piano, keyboards
- Jim Steinman - keyboards, "lascivious effects"
- Roger Powell - synthesizer
- Edgar Winter - saxophone
- Max Weinberg - drums
- Phil Rizzuto - baseball play-by-play
- Rory Dodd - additional backing vocals

== Charts ==
=== Weekly charts ===
| Chart (1978–1979) | Peak position |
|---|---|
| Belgium (Ultratop 50 Flanders) | 2 |
| Canada Top Singles (RPM) | 11 |
| Netherlands (Dutch Top 40) | 1 |
| Netherlands (Single Top 100) | 1 |
| US Billboard Hot 100 | 39 |
| US Cashbox Top 100 | 37 |

| Chart (2022) | Peak position |
|---|---|
| Australia (ARIA) | 81 |
| Global 200 (Billboard) | 109 |
| US Hot Rock & Alternative Songs (Billboard) | 11 |

=== Year-end charts ===
| Chart (1978) | Position |
|---|---|
| Netherlands (Dutch Top 40) | 91 |
| Netherlands (Single Top 100) | 99 |

| Chart (1979) | Position |
|---|---|
| Belgium (Ultratop Flanders) | 36 |
| Netherlands (Dutch Top 40) | 49 |
| Netherlands (Single Top 100) | 6 |

| Chart (1988) | Position |
|---|---|
| Netherlands (Dutch Top 40) | 70 |
| Netherlands (Single Top 100) | 27 |

== Certifications ==
| Region | Certification | Certified units/sales |
|---|---|---|
| Australia (ARIA) | Platinum | 70,000^{‡} |
| Canada (Music Canada) | Platinum | 80,000^{‡} |
| Netherlands (NVPI) | Platinum | 150,000^{^} |
| New Zealand (RMNZ) | Platinum | 30,000^{‡} |
| United Kingdom (BPI) | Platinum | 600,000^{‡} |
| United States (RIAA) | Platinum | 1,000,000^{‡} |
^{^} Shipments figures based on certification alone.^{‡} Sales+streaming figures based on certification alone.

== Legacy ==
Two tracks on Bat Out of Hell II: Back into Hell, Meat Loaf's second installment of what would eventually be a 3-album Bat Out of Hell trilogy, contain lyrics that reference "Paradise by the Dashboard Light". "Objects in the Rear View Mirror May Appear Closer Than They Are" quotes "it was long ago and it was far away" and the next track on the album, Steinman's monologue "Wasted Youth", begins with the same "I remember every little thing as if it happened only yesterday" opening line from "Paradise by the Dashboard Light".

Steinman included "Paradise by the Dashboard Light" in Act One of his 2017 rock musical Bat Out of Hell: The Musical. The song is performed by the characters Falco and Sloane.

== In popular culture ==
In the 2001 film Josie and the Pussycats, the song plays when antagonist Wyatt Frame (Alan Cumming) nearly runs over the titular band and "frames" them in an empty CD case, determining he will make them stars.

In April 2008, AT&T featured Meat Loaf and Tiffany in a parody of "Paradise by the Dashboard Light" for their GoPhone national commercial campaign, releasing the commercial in both an extended music video version and a short commercial edit.

A cappella group The Dartmouth Aires sang the song in the 2011 season finale of the American television competition The Sing-Off and won second place.

On Glee's season 3 episode, "Nationals", Cory Monteith and Lea Michele performed the song as characters Finn Hudson and Rachel Berry. This episode was first broadcast on May 15, 2012.

In 2015, Tom Cruise performed a lip sync battle of the song on The Tonight Show Starring Jimmy Fallon.

Live performance recordings of the song have been included on several Meat Loaf albums, including Live at Wembley (1987), Live Around the World (1996), and Bat Out of Hell: Live with the Melbourne Symphony Orchestra (2004)
