= Mark Alexander (keyboardist) =

American keyboardist

Mark Alexander

Mark Alexander (born c. 1963) is an American keyboardist, vocalist, and producer–songwriter.

== Biography ==
Alexander was born in New Canaan, Connecticut. He started his professional career playing keyboards for R&B singer Meli'sa Morgan (best known for her hit remake of Prince's "Do Me Baby"), before becoming the keyboard player for Little Steven and the Disciples of Soul. He toured with the band in 1988 on the Freedom, No Compromise Tour. Following the tour, he co-produced and played keyboards and synthesizers on Little Steven's Revolution album, and was the keyboardist and vocalist on the subsequent tour. Following the tour, he worked as a session player on various projects produced by Little Steven, including records with Darlene Love, The E Street Band, and Meat Loaf.

Alexander joined Meat Loaf and the Neverland Express in 1990 as pianist-vocalist, touring with him until 1993, when he joined Curtis Stigers' (Arista Records) band as pianist-synthesist. After a year and half of touring, Alexander played piano on Stigers’ follow-up record, Time Was and on his remake of the Nick Lowe-penned "What’s So Funny About Peace Love and Understanding?", which was featured on The Bodyguard soundtrack.

In 1993, Alexander rejoined Meat Loaf for the Bat Out of Hell 2 tour with its hit single "I'd Do Anything For Love (But I Won’t Do That)". Following the tour, Alexander played most of the piano on Loaf's next album, Welcome to the Neighborhood. He was the pianist-synthesist and vocalist on the tour of the same name. In 1996, he performed with Michael Kamen and Luciano Pavarotti on Pavarotti's Together for the Children of Bosnia CD.

In 1997, Alexander joined Joe Cocker's band on the Across From Midnight tour as the pianist and accordionist, and played acoustic guitar during an extended unplugged set. A live DVD of the tour was recorded in Berlin, Germany. Late in 1998, he joined Enrique Iglesias' band as chief synthesist-programmer-keyboardist, touring extensively for two years.

Late in 2001, Alexander rejoined with Meat Loaf once again for the Night of the Proms tour in Europe. After the tour, he played piano on Meat Loaf’s Couldn't Have Said it Better album and Hammond B-3 on the Bat Out of Hell 3 album, produced by Desmond Child. He also played synthesizer in the Billy Joel-Twyla Tharp musical Movin' Out on Broadway, as well as first chair keyboards on the national tours of Jesus Christ Superstar and Love, Janis.

Alexander lives in South Salem, New York, with his family. His son, Brandon, is a young aspiring singer.

== Discography ==
- Revolution - Little Steven, 1989, BMG International
- The Bodyguard, 1992, Arista
- Time Was - Curtis Stigers, 1995, Arista
- Home Alone 2 Soundtrack-Little Steven- 1992, Arista
- Glory of Gershwin Featuring Larry Adler- 1994, Island
- Welcome to the Neighborhood- Meat Loaf, 1995, MCA
- Meat Loaf Live Around the World- 1996, Rhino/Ada
- Pavorotti and Friends for the Children of Bosnia, 1996, Decca
- Joe Cocker-Across From Midnight Tour - Live DVD Eagle Vision
- Couldn’t Have Said it Better- Meat Loaf, 2002, MCA
- This is a Beautiful Town - Michael Zapruder- 2002 Explorable Oriole Records
- Meat Loaf Live with the Melbourne Symphony - Meat Loaf 2004, Sanctuary
- Bat Out of Hell III - Meat Loaf-Mercury, Virgin, 2006
