= Life Is a Lemon and I Want My Money Back =

1993 single by Meat Loaf

Promotional single by Meat Loaf

from the album Bat Out of Hell II: Back into Hell
- Released: October 25, 1993
- Length: 7:59
- Label: Virgin
- Songwriter: Jim Steinman
- Producer: Jim Steinman

Meat Loaf singles chronology
"I'd Do Anything for Love (But I Won't Do That)" (1993)	"Life Is a Lemon and I Want My Money Back" (1993)	"Rock and Roll Dreams Come Through" (1994)

"Life Is a Lemon and I Want My Money Back" is a radio single by Meat Loaf released in October 1993. It was the second single from the album Bat Out of Hell II: Back into Hell and charted on the US Billboard Album Rock Tracks chart at number 17.

== Critical reception ==
AllMusic called the song "a stomping rocker that wraps serious feelings in a cryptically witty metaphor".

== Track listing ==
1. "Life Is a Lemon and I Want My Money Back" (7:59)
2. "Good Girls Go to Heaven (Bad Girls Go Everywhere)" (6:50)

== Charts ==
Chart (1993)	Peak position
US Mainstream Rock (Billboard)	17
