= Rock and Roll Dreams Come Through =

1981 single by Jim Steinman

- Side A of the US single

Single by Jim Steinman

from the album Bad for Good
- B-side: "Love and Death and an American Guitar"
- Released: May 22, 1981
- Length: 4:00 (radio edit); 6:23 (album version)
- Label: Epic
- Songwriter: Jim Steinman
- Producers: Jim Steinman and Jimmy Iovine

Music video
- Video on YouTube

"Rock and Roll Dreams Come Through"

Single by Meat Loaf

from the album Bat Out of Hell II: Back into Hell
- B-side: "I'd Do Anything for Love (But I Won't Do That)" (live) (North America); "Wasted Youth" (Europe)
- Released: November 29, 1993
- Studio: Ocean Way Recording (Los Angeles)
- Length: 5:50 (album version); 4:02 (radio edit)
- Label: MCA; Virgin
- Songwriter: Jim Steinman
- Producer: Jim Steinman

Meat Loaf singles chronology
"Bat Out of Hell" (1993)	"Rock and Roll Dreams Come Through" (1993)	"Objects in the Rear View Mirror May Appear Closer than They Are" (1994)

Music video
- Video on YouTube

"Rock and Roll Dreams Come Through" is a song written by American composer Jim Steinman. It was first featured on Steinman's only solo album, Bad for Good (1981), with lead vocals by an uncredited Rory Dodd. It was later recorded by American singer Meat Loaf and released in 1993 as the third single from his sixth studio album, Bat Out of Hell II: Back into Hell (1993).

Both the Steinman original and the Meat Loaf remake were top-40 hits. Steinman's version hit number 32 on the US Billboard Hot 100, number 14 on the Billboard Rock Top Tracks chart and number 29 on the Cash Box Top 100; it is Steinman's lone top-40 hit as an artist. The Meat Loaf version reached number 11 on the UK Singles Chart, number 13 on the Billboard Hot 100, and number four on Canada's RPM 100 Hit Tracks chart in early 1994. In New Zealand, both versions peaked at number six.

== Music and lyrics ==
"Rock and Roll Dreams Come Through" is a paean to rock music, celebrating how it is always there to help you through troubled times. One of its lyrics is "You're never alone, 'cause you can put on the 'phones and let the drummer tell your heart what to do."

== Release ==
Several versions of the "Rock and Roll Dreams Come Through" have been released. The European and UK version included live versions of "Heaven Can Wait" and "Paradise by the Dashboard Light". A second UK version had "Wasted Youth" and "I'd Do Anything for Love (But I Won't Do That)", while the 7-inch picture disc contains just "Wasted Youth". The US singles contained edited, live and acoustic versions of "I'd Do Anything for Love (But I Won't Do That)".

== Critical reception ==
=== Meat Loaf version ===
Upon the single release, Larry Flick from Billboard magazine wrote, "There were moments when it seemed like 'I'd Do Anything for Love' would never cool off. Its follow-up from the massive comeback set, Bat Out of Hell 2: Back into Hell, is an appropriately grand and cinematic rocker that places Mr. Loaf's aching tenor amid rushes of choir vocals, tinkling piano lines, and chugging rhythm guitars. Diehards undoubtedly will draw comparisons to producer Jim Steinman's own rendition of the tune, while novice fans will happily snarl down this hit-bound version." Alan Jones from Music Week gave it four out of five, saying, "Trimmed to just over five minutes, this long-awaited follow-up to 'I'd Do Anything for Love' is lighter than its chart-topping predecessor, but no less commercial. Radio is already leaping aboard, and a Top 10 placing is a certainty, though another number one seems out of reach, even though there's a 13-minute live version of 'l'd Do Anything...' included." Pan-European magazine Music & Media wrote, "The carnivore rocker cuts another slice from the favoured Bat Out of Hell II loaf. Fewer drama and tempo changes mark the differences with the first single."

== Music videos ==
=== Jim Steinman version ===
The Steinman version's video features an empty, dark stage with two dancers, one male and one female, both in dancing suits and dancing performance art with a prop electric guitar. Steinman is seen throughout in a dark suit and aviator sunglasses standing still on a platform and lip synching the song. Scenes of a black bird of prey are seen at the beginning and end of the video.

=== Meat Loaf version ===
The video for the Meat Loaf version was directed by Michael Bay, who had also directed the videos for "I'd Do Anything for Love (But I Won't Do That)" and "Objects in the Rear View Mirror May Appear Closer than They Are".

In the music video, Meat Loaf stands as a fortuneteller who comforts a recently runaway teenager (played by an 18 year old Angelina Jolie). Meat Loaf's character also protects a young boy from joining a gang and other people who are lost and lonely. Jolie's character, after the song ends, returns to her family.

== Live variations ==
The song has been performed live various times since the release of Bat Out of Hell II: Back into Hell. The song was featured on Live Around the World and a live soundcheck appeared on the MAXI single. The song is featured on the Vh1 Storytellers (Meat Loaf) DVD. It was performed with the Melbourne Symphony Orchestra in 2004 as a sound test, but was not in the actual concert (Its audio can be heard on a special edition of the Bat Out of Hell Live CD). It was showcased in the DVD 3 Bats Live with performance by Meat Loaf in London, Ontario in 2007. It can also be found on the special two-CD edition of Bat Out of Hell II and on the live album Casa De Carne, a bonus CD with the Special Edition (US) Deluxe and Super Deluxe versions (UK) of Meat Loaf's 2010 album Hang Cool Teddy Bear. It is also performed on the 2012 DVD of Guilty Pleasure Tour.

== Charts ==
=== Jim Steinman version ===
==== Weekly charts ====
Chart (1981)	Peak position
Australia (Kent Music Report)	18
Canada Top Singles (RPM)	32
New Zealand (Recorded Music NZ)	6
South Africa (Springbok Radio)	5
UK Singles (Official Charts)	52
US Billboard Hot 100	32
US Mainstream Rock Airplay (Billboard)	14
US Cash Box Top 100	29

==== Year-end charts ====
Chart (1981)	Position
Australia (Kent Music Report)	86
New Zealand (RIANZ)	46
US Billboard Hot 100	171

=== Meat Loaf version ===
==== Weekly charts ====
Chart (1994)	Peak position
Australia (ARIA)	18
Austria (Ö3 Austria Top 40)	17
Belgium (Ultratop 50 Flanders)	23
Canada Top Singles (RPM)	4
Canada Adult Contemporary (RPM)	14
Europe (Eurochart Hot 100)	15
Europe (European Hit Radio)	3
Germany (GfK)	26
Iceland (Íslenski Listinn Topp 40)	8
Ireland (IRMA)	19
Israel (Israeli Singles Chart)	28
Netherlands (Dutch Top 40)	26
Netherlands (Single Top 100)	26
New Zealand (Recorded Music NZ)	6
Scottish Singles Sales (Official Charts)	19
Sweden (Sverigetopplistan)	18
UK Singles (Official Charts)	11
UK Airplay (Music Week)	7
US Billboard Hot 100	13
US Adult Contemporary (Billboard)	24
US Mainstream Rock Airplay (Billboard)	25
US Pop Airplay (Billboard)	10
US Cash Box Top 100	14

==== Year-end charts ====
Chart (1994)	Position
Canada Top Singles (RPM)	40
Europe (European Hit Radio)	38
Sweden (Topplistan)	85
UK Singles (OCC)	119
US Billboard Hot 100	71

== Release history ==
Region	Version	Date	Format(s)	Label(s)	Ref.
United Kingdom	Jim Steinman	May 22, 1981	7-inch vinyl	Epic	
Australia	Meat Loaf	November 29, 1993	CD; cassette	Virgin	
United States	Meat Loaf	January 1994	7-inch vinyl; CD; cassette	MCA	
United Kingdom	Meat Loaf	February 7, 1994	7-inch vinyl; CD; cassette	Virgin	
United Kingdom	Meat Loaf	February 14, 1994	CD digipak	Virgin	
Japan	Meat Loaf	April 8, 1994	Mini-CD	Virgin	
