= Kasim Sulton =

American musician (born 1955)

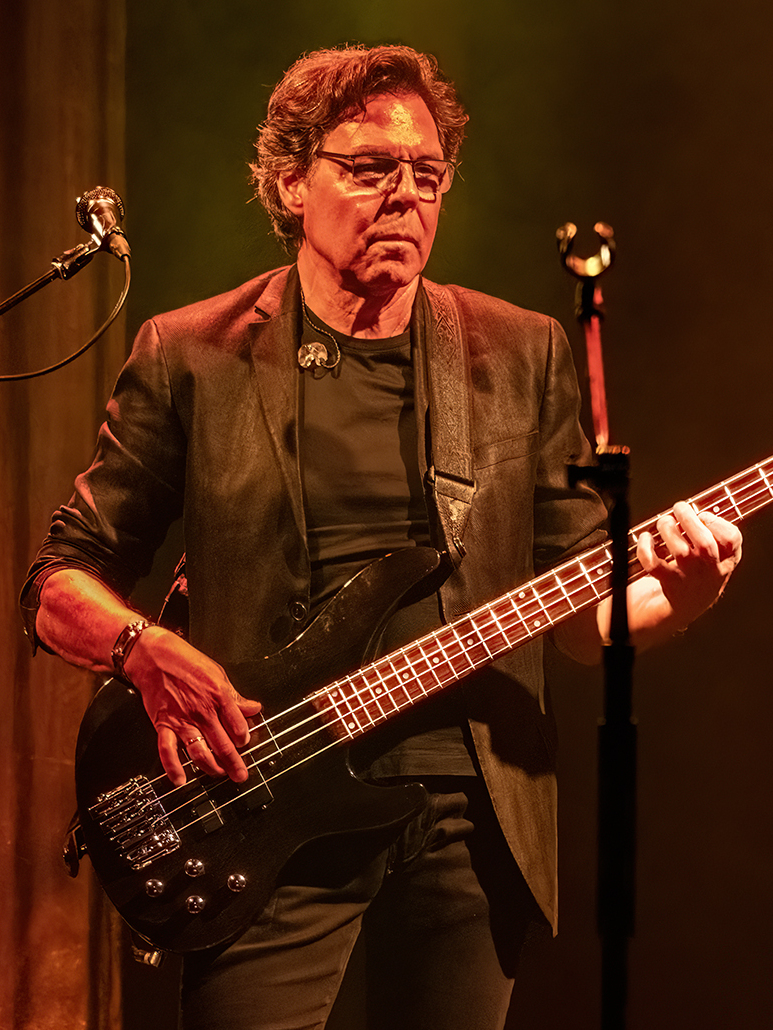
- Sulton performing with Todd Rundgren at the Knight Theater in Charlotte, North Carolina, 2025

Background information
- Born: Kasim Anthony Sulton; December 8, 1955 (age 70); Staten Island, New York, U.S.
- Genres: New wave; hard rock; progressive rock
- Occupations: Musician; songwriter; arranger; music director; producer
- Instruments: Vocals; bass; keyboards; guitar
- Years active: 1976–present
- Label: Sphere Sound
- Website: www.kasimsulton.com

Kasim Sulton (born December 8, 1955) is an American bassist, keyboardist, guitarist, and vocalist. Best known for his work with Utopia, Sulton sang lead on 1979's "Set Me Free", Utopia's only top 40 hit in the United States. As a solo artist, Sulton hit the Canadian top 40 in 1982 with "Don't Break My Heart".

Sulton has often collaborated with Utopia’s founder Todd Rundgren on many projects.

== Biography ==
Kasim Sulton was born December 8, 1955. He is of Greek and Turkish descent.

Sulton attended and graduated in 1973 from Susan E. Wagner High School in Staten Island, New York. He married his high school sweetheart, Laurie Rampulla, and had three children with her. She died in 2011.

Sulton started his musical career playing piano and vocals for Cherry Vanilla and guitar for Brooklyn-based band Sleepy Hollow before gaining a place in Utopia in 1976. During his time with Utopia, they recorded nine albums and toured extensively until disbanding in 1986, with occasional reunions to the present. In addition to singing "Set Me Free," he also wrote the song, "as a thumbing of my nose to Bearsville Records."

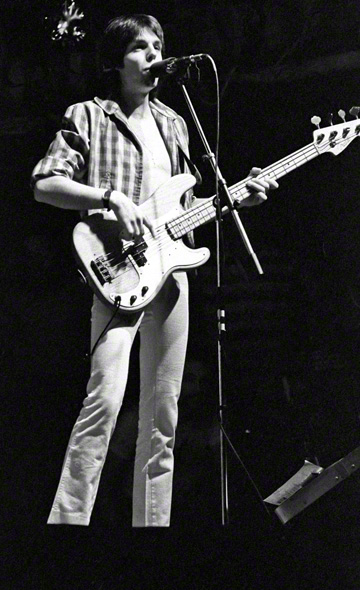
Sulton performing in 1978 in Arcosanti, Arizona with Utopia

He has toured with Blue Öyster Cult, Meat Loaf, Hall & Oates, Cheap Trick, Patty Smyth, Akiko Yano and Richie Sambora, among many other artists. As a studio musician, he has played on albums by Patti Smith, Indigo Girls and Steve Stevens, and appeared on an album of traditional Irish music by Eileen Ivers. He was a member of Joan Jett's backing band, The Blackhearts, touring with them and playing on Jett's album Up Your Alley (1988) as well as contributing a number of tracks to her album of cover songs called The Hit List (1990).

Sulton was the bassist and sang background vocals on the breakout Meat Loaf album Bat Out of Hell. He and Thommy Price collaborated on an album, Lights On, which Sulton co-wrote. The song "No T.V. No Phone" was featured in the comedy film The Allnighter (1987), starring Susanna Hoffs.

Sulton recorded a solo album on September 4, 2002, entitled Quid Pro Quo. The album was released on Sphere Sound Records, and Sulton played all but two instruments on the album. He later released another solo album, "3" the fall of 2014, which featured Todd Rundgren on "Clocks All Stopped."

Sulton sang background vocals on Meat Loaf's album Bat Out of Hell II: Back into Hell, joining his backing band, Neverland Express, touring for three years on the Everything Louder Tour. He also recorded on Meat Loaf's album Welcome to the Neighborhood, arranging and singing background vocals on most of the tracks. He went on to become Music director for Meat Loaf, rehearsing Meat Loaf's band, Neverland Express, in preparation for touring. The Very Best of Meat Loaf album was released with three new tracks, one of which, "Is Nothing Sacred", was later re-recorded as a duet with Patti Russo and produced by Sulton, with the track reaching No. 15 on the UK charts. Sulton also produced the Meat Loaf album Storytellers, and toured with the band on the Night of the Proms Tour in Europe and the "Meat Loaf Just Havin' Fun for the Summer" and "Winter" Tour in the United States and Europe, where he and Patti Russo both served as opening acts. He also toured on Meat Loaf's "Couldn't Have Said It Better" tour where he played a short solo acoustic set to open the concert at most venues. One of Meat Loaf's shows on this tour was filmed for the DVD Bat Out of Hell: Live with the Melbourne Symphony Orchestra. Kasim also toured on the 2005 "Hair of the Dog" Tour and the 2006–2007 "Bat Out of Hell III" tour, and he is featured as bassist/backing vocalist on the album. In summer 2008, he rejoined Meat Loaf for The Casa de Carne Tour.

Sulton played bass in the pit orchestra for the Twyla Tharp-choreographed musical based on Billy Joel music called Movin' Out on Broadway.

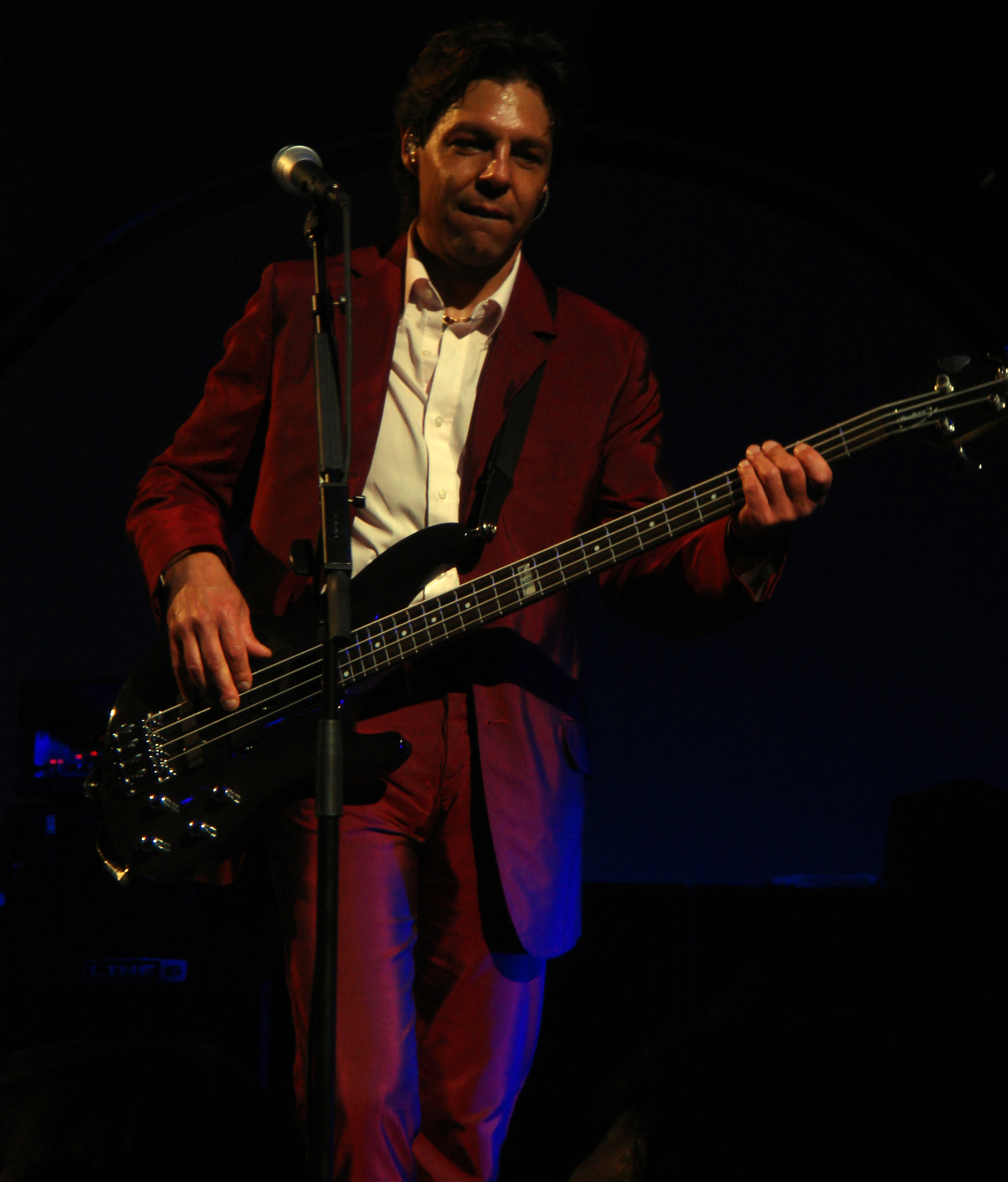
Sulton performing with The New Cars in 2006.

After a brief stint with the reunited band Scandal in 2004, Sulton joined The New Cars in 2005, replacing original Cars bassist and co-lead vocalist Benjamin Orr, who died of cancer in 2000. The band also included original Cars band members Elliot Easton and Greg Hawkes as well as Todd Rundgren and Prairie Prince from Journey and The Tubes. An album, It's Alive!, was followed by a tour in 2006, with Sulton singing lead on The Cars' hit "Drive".

Sulton continues to appear live playing bass, keyboards, and guitar on most Todd Rundgren tours, including the 2008–09 "Arena" gigs, 2009–10 performances of the classic album A Wizard, a True Star (1973) in the United States and Europe, and 2010 "TR's Johnson" shows. He was in the band for the six show "Todd/Healing Albums Live" tour that began Labor Day Weekend of 2010 in Akron, Ohio, and played a solo show before the premiere. He also played in the second run of "Todd/Healing Albums Live", a five-show tour that began on 25 March 2011 in Hartford, Connecticut.

In 2011, Sulton replaced Matt Bissonette as the bass player in the Beatles tribute supergroup Yellow Matter Custard.

In 2012, he joined the classic hard rock band Blue Öyster Cult; he remained its bassist until 2017. Sulton again joined Blue Öyster Cult for a string of dates in 2026, filling in for an ailing Eric Bloom.

In September 2015, Sulton, along with legendary songwriter Paul Williams, led a global virtual songwriting collaboration at Hookist.com. The mission was to write the first crowd-sourced anthem to be performed at FacingAddiction.org's concert and rally on The National Mall on 4 October 2015, headlined by Steven Tyler, Sheryl Crow and Joe Walsh among others. The theme of the song was "Celebrate Recovery" and the goal was to reduce the stigma associated with addiction. Sulton, Williams and Dr. Mehmet Oz opened the show and led 10,000 people in a singalong of "Voice Of Change" at the base of the Washington Monument. Sulton also led a singalong of the song on The Dr. Oz Show which quickly went viral.

A new Kasim Sulton solo album, recorded through 2019 and 2020, was released in 2021 by Deko Records. It includes contributions from notable musicians from Kasim's past and present including Prairie Prince, Mickey Curry, Keith Scott, Gil Assayas, Phil Thornalley and John Siegler.

== Discography ==
Solo

- Kasim (1982, EMI America)
- Lights On (with Thommy Price) (1986, CBS Associated Records)
- The Basement Tapes (1998)
- Quid Pro Quo (2002, Sphere Sound)
- An Evening With Kasim Sulton: Live in Atlanta (DVD 2006)
- All Sides(2009)
- 3 (Three) (2014)
- Live Bootleg (2017)
- Kasim 2021 (2021)

With Todd Rundgren and Utopia

- Ra (1977, Bearsville Records)
- Oops! Wrong Planet (1977, Bearsville Records)
- Back to the Bars (1978, Bearsville Records)
- Adventures in Utopia (1980, Bearsville Records)
- Deface the Music (1980, Bearsville Records)
- Swing to the Right (1982, Bearsville Records)
- Utopia (1982, Network Records)
- Oblivion (1984, Passport Records)
- POV (1985, Passport Records)
- Trivia (1987, Gem Records)
- Anthology (1989 Rhino Records)
- Nearly Human (1989, Warner Bros. Records)
- Redux '92: Live in Japan (1992 BMG)
- Oblivion, POV & Some Trivia (1996)
- With a Twist (1997)
- Somewhere/Anywhere? (1998)
- Official Bootleg Tokyo '79 (1999)
- City In My Head (1999)
- One Long Year (2000)
- Todd Rundgren Live (2000)
- Utopia Live in Boston: 1982 DVD (2004)
- White Knight (2017)

With Meat Loaf

- Bat Out of Hell (1977, Cleveland International Records)
- Rock and Roll Hero (1992 Sony Records)
- Bat out of Hell II (1993)
- Welcome to the Neighborhood (1995)
- Live Around the World (1996)
- The Very Best of Meat Loaf (1998)
- VH1: Storytellers (1999)
- Couldn't Have Said It Better (2003)
- Bat Out of Hell: Live with the Melbourne Symphony Orchestra (2004)
- Bat Out of Hell III (2006)
- Hang Cool Teddy Bear (2010)

Other appearances

| Title | Artist | Year |
|---|---|---|
| L | Steve Hillage | 1976 |
| TRB Two | Tom Robinson Band | 1979 |
| Guitars & Women | Rick Derringer | 1979 |
| Frankie Eldorado | Frankie Eldorado | 1980 |
| Wasp | Shaun Cassidy | 1980 |
| Bad for Good | Jim Steinman | 1981 |
| Party of Two | The Rubinoos | 1983 |
| The Burns Sisters | The Burns Sisters | 1986 |
| Good Music | Joan Jett | 1986 |
| Never Enough | Patty Smyth | 1987 |
| Dream of Life | Patti Smith | 1987 |
| Unfinished Business | Ronnie Spector | 1987 |
| Safety Love | David Drew | 1988 |
| Up Your Alley | Joan Jett | 1988 |
| Indigo Girls | Indigo Girls | 1989 |
| Atomic Playboys | Steve Stevens | 1989 |
| The Hit List | Joan Jett | 1990 |
| Tall Stories | Johnny Hates Jazz | 1991 |
| Patty Smyth | Patty Smyth | 1992 |
| Traditional Irish Music | Eileen Ivers | 1994 |
| Required Rocking | Rick Derringer | 1996 |
| Wild Blue | Eileen Ivers | 1996 |
| Falling Into You | Celine Dion | 1996 |
| Free Spirit | Bonnie Tyler | 1996 |
| Palookaville | Glen Burtnik | 1996 |
| I.De.A. | Kyosuke Himuro | 1997 |
| Greatest Hits Featuring Scandal | Patty Smyth | 1998 |
| Tough Room ... This World | Ricky Byrd | 1999 |
| The Wonderground | Boy Meets Girl | 2003 |
| Pushing Red Buttons | Pushing Red Buttons | 2003 |
| Back On Track | Lulu | 2004 |
| Unstoppable | Sounding Rick | 2005 |
| Never Be Famous | Sounding Rick | 2013 |
| Poppy Wisdom | Sounding Rick | 2015 |
| Astral Drive | Astral Drive | 2018 |
| Orange | Astral Drive | 2021 |
| One (and Done) | Kül Friis | 2021 |
| Bodega Flowers | Mark Duda | 2022 |
