= Patti Russo =

American singer/songwriter

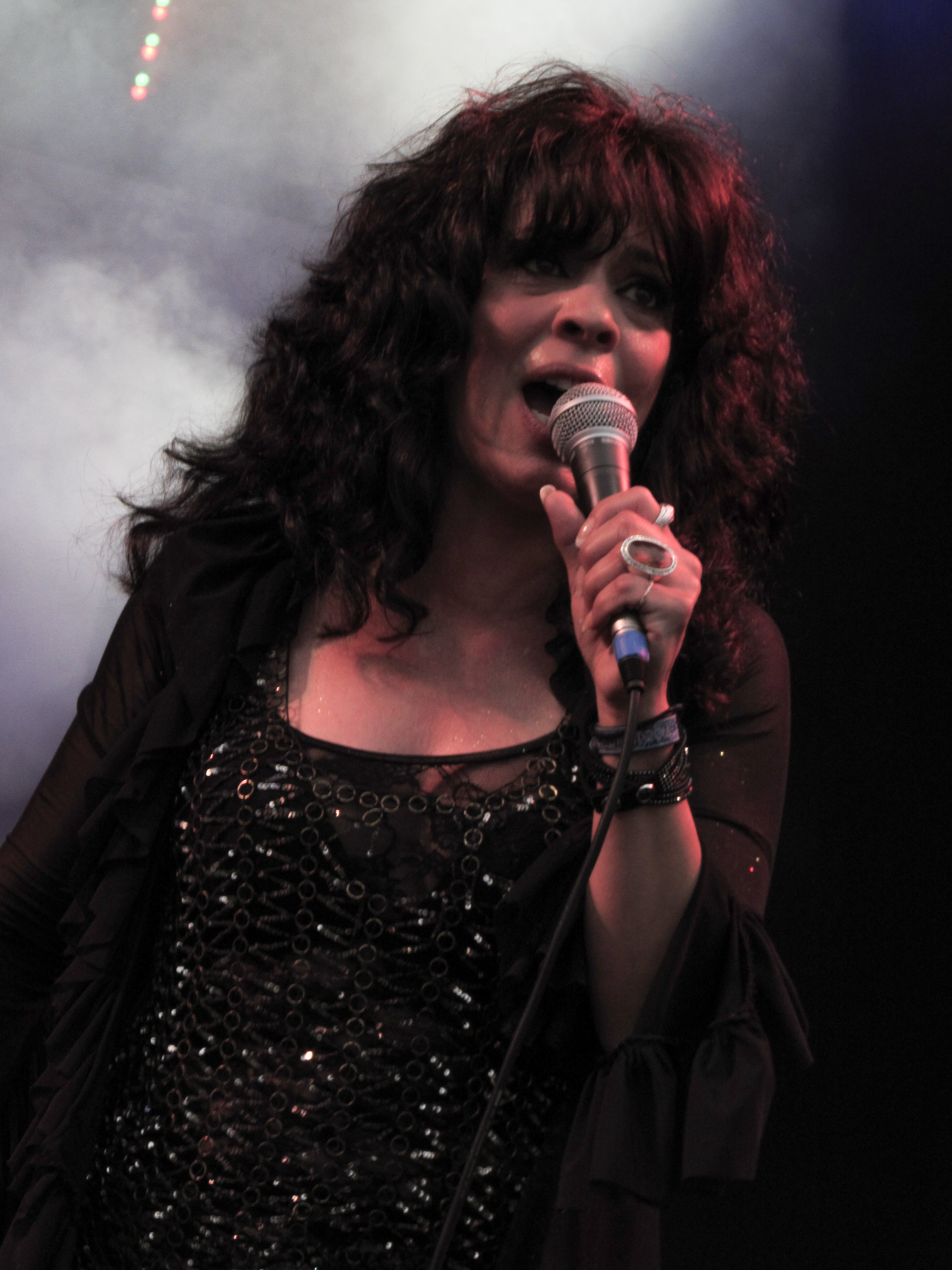
- Patti Russo performing at the Isle of Wight festival 2014.

Background information
- Born: Patricia Russo; May 20, 1964 (age 62); New Jersey, U.S.
- Genres: Wagnerian rock, rock
- Occupations: Singer, Songwriter
- Instrument: Vocals
- Years active: 1992-present
- Formerly of: Trans-Siberian Orchestra, Neverland Express
- Website: patti-rocks.com

Patricia Russo (May 20, 1964) is an American singer and songwriter. She acted as Meat Loaf's female lead vocalist, touring the world with his band Neverland Express between 1993 and 2013. Since then, she has embarked on a solo career.

== Work with Meat Loaf, TSO, Queen, Cher (1993–2013) ==
In 1992, Patti Russo was a finalist on Dick Clark’s USA Music Challenge, which aired nationally on American Broadcasting Company (ABC). The following year, she auditioned for rock singer Meat Loaf and was cast as his female lead vocalist. Russo is featured as Meat Loaf's duet partner on numerous albums, singles and videos. Russo has also been featured as Meat Loaf's opening act, debuting her own original material. She debuted her solo song "Bring Me a Bible and a Beer" during Meat Loaf's shows on the 2008 Casa de Carne Tour. Russo has recorded duets on all of Meat Loaf's albums since 1995.

Russo has also sung lead vocals with groups such as Trans-Siberian Orchestra (TSO) and Queen. She sang the role of Theresa, Beethoven's Immortal Beloved, on the TSO album Beethoven's Last Night. She sang “Perfect Christmas Night” with TSO on the soundtrack to the Jim Carrey movie How the Grinch Stole Christmas. She performed with Queen (band), singing lead at the Queen's Day Festival in Amsterdam and at their induction into the Hollywood Walk of Fame. She toured as a soloist with the Jon Tiven Band performing at the Porretta Soul Festival and Umbria Jazz Festival in Italy. She toured the UK as a soloist with the SAS Band and is featured as a lead vocalist in the SAS Band's DVD Motown 2 Memphis. In 2009–2010, Russo performed in Cher's Las Vegas shows. In 2011, Russo recorded the duet “Come Taste the Band” on Doogie White’s album As Yet Untitled.

As a songwriter, Russo's song "Take Good Care of My Heart" is featured as the theme song in the Warner Brothers feature South Beach Dreams. The song featured Russo on lead vocals and was co-produced by composer-producer Fred Weinberg. Russo also co-wrote the Meat Loaf single "Runnin' for the Red Light (I Gotta Life)". Russo’s song "Bible and a Beer", co-written with guitarist Jon Tiven, was recorded by jazz singer Betty Harris. Russo's own original recordings can be found on her Spotify page.

As an actress, Russo played the lead role of Esmeralda in the London production of Notre Dame de Paris. She also performed as Esmeralda on the Royal Variety Performance in 2000. Russo played the character of "Killer Queen" in the Las Vegas version of the musical We Will Rock You, based on the music of Queen. She guest-starred in the New York City musicals The 12 and The Rock Tenor and the Night of Broadway benefit shows.

Russo's television credits include The Tonight Show with Jay Leno, Late Show with David Letterman, The View, Entertainment Tonight, Don't Forget the Lyrics, Donny and Marie, Qcheck, Huckabee, Lopez Tonight, The USA Music Challenge, Top of the Pops, Brit Awards, American Music Awards, Party in the Park - Hyde Park UK, The Prince's Trust - UK, Royal Variety Performance - UK, Pres. Clinton's 2nd Inaugural Ball - Washington, D.C., NRL Grand Final - Sydney, AFL Grand Final - Melbourne, Night of the Proms - Belgium, Germany, Netherlands. Russo has been featured with Meat Loaf in numerous MTV and VH1 music specials including The History of Meat Loaf Live, Live in the Neighborhood, On Tour (PBS), Behind the Music, VH1: Storytellers, Hard Rock Live, Live in Mexico City and Guilty Pleasure Live.

Russo has performed for numerous charitable benefits including Battersea Dogs and Cats Home, Covenant House, The Painted Turtle, The Prince's Trust, Lifetime Applauds: The Fight Against Breast Cancer, Hurricane Katrina relief, Blythedale Children's Hospital, Concert at the Kings Rock Against Cancer, Wintershall Charity Rock Concert, Starkey Hearing Foundation, Rock ‘n Roar for a Cure, Little Dreams Foundation, United We Rock Foundation, Royal Variety Charity, and Queen AIDS charity concert.

== Solo career (2014–present) ==
Russo pursued a solo career starting with the release of an EP and a live tour in April 2014.

=== HOW ARE YA, 5-0H! tour ===
Russo's first tour – HOW ARE YA, 5-0H! – kicked off at The Brook in Southampton on April 10, 2014.

==== Typical setlist ====
1. "It's a Beautiful Day"
2. "Don't Stop Me Now"
3. "I'd Lie for You (And That's the Truth)"
4. "Bring Me a Bible and a Beer"
5. "In the Tomatoes"
6. "Black Velvet"
7. "Dead Ringer for Love"
8. "Vision of You"
9. "Here We Are"
10. "Baby Love"
11. "I Don't Give a Damn"
12. "Whole Lot of Nothing"
13. "Long Train Runnin'"
14. "One Door Opens"
15. "River Deep – Mountain High"

Russo also appeared at the Isle of Wight Festival in the Strongbow Garden on Sunday 15 June 2014 and at Sommerfest in Norway in August 2014. She performed 5 shows in 2015 in Wavendon, Bury St. Edmunds, London, Southampton, and Leeds. Russo was the headliner at the closing gala of BritWeek Miami in 2015.

In summer 2015 Russo released a new single, titled "When it Comes to Love", with Belgian producers and DJs Regi and Lester Williams. The song was written by Russo and Tonino Speciale and recorded in summer 2014 and was initially being considered for the 2015 James Bond film Spectre. Remixed by Regi and Lester Williams featuring Patti's original vocals, When it Comes to Love was released on 31 August. The single reached #5 on the Belgium Singles Top 50 Chart.

In 2016, Russo toured as a lead vocalist with Moon World Records' History of Rock tour. On May 21, 2016, Russo performed at the Concert at the Kings Rock Against Cancer. On July 2, 2016, Russo performed alongside Roger Taylor (Queen drummer) and Jeff Beck at Wintershall Charity Rock Concert.

In 2017, Russo toured as a lead vocalist with Symphonic Rhapsody of Queen.

In 2019, Russo performed as a guest lead vocalist on the SAS Band's 25 Riff tour, and she performed as a lead vocalist at McCartney Mania and Beatles on the Beach Festival.

== Discography ==
Solo

- Patti Russo XO (EP, 2014)
- "When It Comes to Love" (Single, 2015)

With Meat Loaf

- Bat Out of Hell II: Picture Show (VHS, 1994)
- Welcome to the Neighbourhood (1995)
- "I'd Lie for You (And That's the Truth)" (Single, 1995, Duet)
- "Runnin' for the Red Light (I Gotta Life)" (Single, 1996, Co-writer)
- Live Around the World (1996)
- The Very Best of Meat Loaf (1998)
- "Is Nothing Sacred" (Single, 1999, Duet)
- VH1: Storytellers (DVD & CD, 1999)
- Best of Night of the Proms Vol.1 (DVD, 2001)
- Couldn't Have Said It Better (2003)
- "Couldn't Have Said It Better" (Single, 2003, Duet)
- Bat Out of Hell: Live with the Melbourne Symphony Orchestra (DVD & CD, 2004)
- Bat Out of Hell III: The Monster Is Loose (2006)
- Hang Cool Teddy Bear (2010)
- Hell in a Handbasket (2011)
- Guilty Pleasure Tour (Live from Sydney DVD and CD, 2012)

With Queen (band)

- Queen’s Day (Live from Amsterdam, 2002)

With Trans-Siberian Orchestra

- Beethoven’s Last Night (2000)
- How the Grinch Stole Christmas (soundtrack) (2000)
- Tales of Winter: Selections from the TSO Rock Operas (2013)

With SAS Band

- Motown 2 Memphis (DVD, 2010)
