= You Took the Words Right Out of My Mouth =

1977 single by Meat Loaf

- Side-A label of U.S. 7-inch vinyl single

Single by Meat Loaf

from the album Bat Out of Hell
- B-side: "For Crying Out Loud"; "Paradise by the Dashboard Light" (1978 reissue)
- Released: October 1977 (US): March 24, 1978 (UK)
- Recorded: 1976
- Genre: Rock; pop rock
- Length: 4:15 (w/o spoken intro); 5:04 (w/ spoken intro); 3:40 (single edit)
- Label: Epic
- Songwriter: Jim Steinman
- Producer: Todd Rundgren

Meat Loaf singles chronology
"You Took the Words Right Out of My Mouth" (1977)	"Two Out of Three Ain't Bad" (1978)

Music video
- Video on YouTube

"You Took the Words Right Out of My Mouth" (also known as "You Took the Words Right Out of My Mouth (Hot Summer Night)") is the debut solo single by the American singer Meat Loaf, released in 1977 as the lead single from his debut album Bat Out of Hell. The song was written by Jim Steinman.

== Background ==
According to his autobiography, Meat Loaf asked Jim Steinman to write a song that was not 15 or 20 minutes long, and, in Meat Loaf's words, a "pop song." His autobiography also dates the writing of the song to 1975, the song reportedly being a key factor in Meat Loaf and Steinman deciding to do an album together.

The song was the first single released from the album, with an edit of "For Crying Out Loud" as the B-side. The record peaked at No. 73 in the Record World singles chart, but only reached No. 97 in Cash Box and didn't appear at all in Billboard Hot 100. Billboard reviewed the single, finding the guitar introduction to be energetic, the beat to be "catchy" and the vocal performance to be somewhat similar to Bruce Springsteen. Billboard also commented on how occasional pauses in the instruments allow the "infectious" vocals to be highlighted.

The power ballad begins with a spoken word introduction by Jim Steinman and actress Marcia McClain.

== Commercial performance ==
Following the success of the next two singles, "Two Out of Three Ain't Bad" and "Paradise by the Dashboard Light", the song was re-released in October 1978 with "Paradise by the Dashboard Light" as the B-side. This time it peaked at #39 on the Billboard Hot 100 chart and #42 on the Cash Box Top 100 over a year after the first release of the song.

== Reception ==
Cash Box called it "a classic rocker from its Spector-esque drum sound to the a capella coda with handclaps" and said that it "is a perfect rock synthesis." It also said that Meat Loaf provides a "shivering performance." Record World called it a "powerful pop-rocker" and said that "the title/hook is as good as any this year."

== Music video ==
The video, as with "Two Out of Three Ain't Bad", "Paradise by the Dashboard Light", and the others in the "Bat out of Hell" set, was filmed on a soundstage as if it were a live performance, with Meat Loaf in his signature suspenders, ripped formal shirt, and bearing a red scarf.

== Personnel ==
- Meat Loaf - lead vocals, percussion (as Marvin Lee)
- Todd Rundgren - guitar, percussion, backing vocals
- Kasim Sultan - bass guitar
- Roy Bittan - piano, keyboards
- Jim Steinman - keyboards, percussion, male dialogue intro
- Roger Powell - synthesizer
- Edgar Winter - saxophone
- Max Weinberg - drums
- Rory Dodd, Ellen Foley - additional backing vocals
- Marcia McClain - female dialogue intro

== Charts ==
=== Weekly charts ===
Chart (1977)	Peak position
US Cash Box Top 100	97
US Record World Singles Chart	73

Chart (1978–79)	Peak position
Australia (Kent Music Report)	3
Belgium (Ultratop 50 Flanders)	4
Canada Top Singles (RPM)	31
Netherlands (Dutch Top 40)	3
Netherlands (Single Top 100)	4
New Zealand (Recorded Music NZ)	2
UK Singles (Official Charts)	33
US Billboard Hot 100	39
US Cash Box Top 100	42
US Record World Singles Chart	49
West Germany (GfK)	22

=== Year-end charts ===
Chart (1979)	Position
Australia (Kent Music Report)	9
Belgium (Ultratop Flanders)	52
Netherlands (Dutch Top 40)	52
Netherlands (Single Top 100)	21
New Zealand (Recorded Music NZ)	4

== Certifications ==
Certifications for "You Took the Words Right Out of My Mouth"
Region	Certification	Certified units/sales
Australia (ARIA)	Platinum	70,000^{‡}
New Zealand (RMNZ)	Platinum	30,000^{‡}
United Kingdom (BPI)	Gold	400,000^{‡}
^{‡} Sales+streaming figures based on certification alone.
