= Bat Out of Hell (song) =

1979 single by Meat Loaf

- UK 12-inch red vinyl limited edition (1979)

Single by Meat Loaf

from the album Bat Out of Hell
- B-side: "Heaven Can Wait"
- Released: May 1978
- Genre: Hard rock, progressive rock, heavy metal
- Length: 9:52 (album version); 7:19 (edit); 4:53 (single edit)
- Label: Epic
- Songwriter: Jim Steinman
- Producer: Todd Rundgren

Meat Loaf singles chronology
"Paradise by the Dashboard Light" (1977)	"Bat Out of Hell" (1978)	"Dead Ringer for Love" (1981)
"I'd Do Anything for Love (But I Won't Do That)" (1993)	"Bat Out of Hell" (1993)	"Rock and Roll Dreams Come Through" (1993)

Music video
- "Bat Out of Hell" on YouTube

"Bat Out of Hell" is a song written by Jim Steinman for the 1977 album Bat Out of Hell and performed by Meat Loaf. In Australia, the song was picked as the second single from the album in May 1978, accompanied by a music video. In January 1979, the song was released as a single in the UK and other European countries, and re-released in 1993.

== Inspiration ==
Like most songs on the album, the song was written about Peter Pan and the Neverland story. Steinman had intended for the song to appear on "a rock 'n roll sci-fi version of Peter Pan". Steinman finally completed the musical (which he started writing in 1968) in 2017.

The song was also inspired by teenage tragedy songs such as "Leader of the Pack", "Terry" and "Tell Laura I Love Her", the latter being the first single Jim Steinman had ever bought. Steinman wanted to write the "most extreme crash song of all time":

There is something so thrilling to me about that operatic narrative that involves a cataclysmic event, especially one so perfectly intune with a teenager's world, and rock and roll, as a car or motorcycle crash.

On a musical and thematic level, "Bat Out of Hell", both single and album, are often compared to the work of Bruce Springsteen, particularly the Born to Run album, and especially the song "Thunder Road". Steinman says that he finds that "puzzling, musically," although they share influences. "Springsteen was more an inspiration than an influence." A BBC article suggested, "...the fact that Max Weinberg and Roy Bittan from Springsteen's E Street Band played on the album only helped reinforce the comparison."

According to Meat Loaf, the song is "constructed from" a shot near the beginning of Alfred Hitchcock's Psycho in which the viewer looks down a valley and sees the lights of a city. He says all the clients in the Bates Motel "wish they would have left like a bat out of hell... It had nothing to do, believe it or not, with Bruce Springsteen. It had to do with Alfred Hitchcock and Psycho."

=== Neverland ===
The song, along with "Heaven Can Wait" and "All Revved Up with No Place To Go", originally featured in Steinman's Peter Pan-inspired 1977 un-finished musical Neverland, which was finally completed in 2018 and renamed Bat Out of Hell. Steinman and Meat Loaf, who were touring with The National Lampoon Show, felt that the three songs were "exceptional" and Steinman began to develop them as part of a seven-song set they wanted to record as an album. In the musical, the character of Baal describes to Wendy what Neverland feels like: "The sirens are screaming and the fires are howling..." After the first chorus, Wendy screams "Don't leave me." There is some rapid dialogue after the second chorus between Tink, Baal and Wendy, concluding:

Tink: Lost boys.
Baal: Lost girls.
Tink: Year after year.
Baal: Sooner or later—
Tink:—they'll never grow up.
Both: Sooner or later, they'll never grow up.
Wendy: Never grow up...

Baal yells "Destiny", and continues into the motorcycle part of the song.

== Music and lyrics ==
"Bat Out of Hell"
This sample features the beginning of the chorus.

The song opens with an instrumental section lasting nearly two minutes, predominantly featuring piano and guitar. The lyrics begin to set the scene of evil, guns, knives and "blood shot streets."

The song then focuses upon a "pure" girl, which Sounds magazine commented is "always an important symbol".

Oh baby you're the only thing in this whole world
That's pure and good and right
And wherever you are and wherever you go
There's always gonna be some light

In Bat Out of Hell: The Musical, Steinman confirmed that the "pure girl" is a character called Raven, who was based on the Neverland character Wendy Darling. The protagonist singing to her is "Strat" who is based on Peter Pan.

Steinman says that Rundgren vetoed two of his ideas. The first idea involved this section (the second concerns a later part of the song).

In the soft section, I wanted to have a boy’s choir... Todd wanted to do it with the existing vocal backup section and then speed up the tape and use other technical tricks to get the boy’s choir sound. I said that we needed a real boy’s choir but he insisted. But it didn’t work out so we weren’t able to use it. You see, I’d heard this symphony by Mahler and I really wanted a boy’s choir. There’s nothing more beautiful than the sound of 20 boy sopranos singing.

=== Motorcycle ===
Steinman insisted that the song should contain the sound of a motorcycle, and complained to producer Todd Rundgren at the final overdub session about its absence. Rather than use a recording of a real motorcycle, Rundgren himself played the section on guitar, leading straight into the solo without a break. In his autobiography, Meat Loaf relates how everyone in the studio was impressed with his improvisation. Meat Loaf commends Rundgren's overall performance on the track:

In fifteen minutes he played the lead solo and then played the harmony guitars at the beginning. I guarantee the whole thing didn't take him more than forty-five minutes, and the song itself is ten minutes long. The most astounding thing I have ever seen in my life.

Steinman also wanted a choir in this section of the song, but Rundgren vetoed it. Steinman says that he wanted it to sound "just like in the film 2001: A Space Odyssey, they used a choir sounding like it was singing whole clusters of notes. I wanted to use an entire orchestra, and I wanted to use them viciously."

=== Crash ===
Rundgren and Meat Loaf were angry with Steinman when he refused to stop writing when the track was already six minutes long. He knew that he had to do the crash.

The lyrics describe how the biker is riding "faster than any other boy has ever gone." He is so involved that he "never [sees] the sudden curve till it's way too late." Drums and a roaring guitar indicate the crash.

The biker lies fatally injured, "torn and twisted at the foot of a burning bike." He can see his "heart still beating", which is also represented musically through bass guitar, a section devised by Kasim Sulton. Steinman says "I don't think there's ever been a more violent crash... the guy basically has his body opened up and his heart explodes like a bat out of hell."

Throughout the song, the chorus "I'll be gone when the morning comes" is a double entendre of leaving his lover and of his impending death.

The song ends with the line "like a bat out of hell" repeated three times, each ending on a high C.

== Music video ==
The video intersperses shots of a motorcyclist riding through a graveyard, lit by a full moon, with shots of Meat Loaf and backing singers at microphones.

== Single release ==
Despite being released more than a year after the album became available, the single reached number 15 in the UK in 1979, becoming his first top 20 UK hit and the highest-charting song off the Bat Out of Hell album and was reissued in December 1993 following the huge chart success of "I'd Do Anything for Love (But I Won't Do That)" in 1993. This time it reached number 8 giving Meat Loaf two singles in the UK Top Ten at the same time - a feat not repeated by any artist until 2001. A live version of the song, from the album Live at Wembley, was released as a single on 26 October 1987 but failed to chart in the UK.

== Critical reaction ==
Sounds magazine described it as "heavy metal thunder with Bruce Springsteen overtones (it's L-O-U-D, but this fellow sang with Ted Nugent...), a lyrical, white-noise tale of screaming sirens, silver black phantom bikes, the Ultimate Girl and her purity (always an important symbol), ending in the final death crash when his heart tears out of his chest and flies away."

The song was honored at the Q Awards 2008 with the "Classic Song" award. Paul Rees, Q's editor in chief, said: "There are some songs that transcend such things as time and genre, and "Bat Out Of Hell" is assuredly one of them. It sounded extraordinary when it was first released, and it appears no less so now—like something beamed in from another planet. Extraordinary, and magnificent too, thanks in large part to one of the great vocal performances on record."

This song placed third of Top Gear's Top 5 Ultimate Driving Songs, as voted by the audience of the show. It was ranked below Queen's "Don't Stop Me Now" and Golden Earring's "Radar Love". The song was viewed negatively by the show's hosts, Jeremy Clarkson, James May, and Richard Hammond, who implored viewers of the show to not vote for the song, with Clarkson calling Meat Loaf a "fat oaf".

Brett Milano of udiscovermusic.com rated this motorcycle guitar solo as one of the 100 all-time greatest.

== Charts ==
1993 weekly chart performance for "Bat Out of Hell"
Chart (1993)	Peak position
UK Singles (Official Charts)	8

2022 weekly chart performance for "Bat Out of Hell"
Chart (2022)	Peak position
US Hot Rock & Alternative Songs (Billboard)	23

== Certifications ==
Region	Certification	Certified units/sales
Australia (ARIA)	Platinum	70,000^{‡}
New Zealand (RMNZ)	Platinum	30,000^{‡}
United Kingdom (BPI)	Platinum	600,000^{‡}
^{‡} Sales+streaming figures based on certification alone.

== Personnel ==
- Meat Loaf - lead vocals
- Todd Rundgren - backing vocals, electric guitar, keyboards, percussion
- Roy Bittan - piano, keyboards
- Jim Steinman - keyboards, percussion
- Kasim Sulton - backing vocals, bass guitar
- Roger Powell - synthesizer
- Max Weinberg - drums
- Rory Dodd - backing vocals
- Ellen Foley - backing vocals
