= Two Out of Three Ain't Bad =

- Side A of 1978 US 7-inch single

Single by Meat Loaf

from the album Bat Out of Hell
- B-side: "For Crying Out Loud"
- Released: March 1978 (US): July 21, 1978 (UK)
- Genre: Soft rock
- Length: 5:27 (LP version); 4:46 (radio edit); 3:58 (7" version)
- Label: Epic
- Songwriter: Jim Steinman
- Producer: Todd Rundgren

Meat Loaf singles chronology
| "You Took the Words Right Out of My Mouth" (1977) | "Two Out of Three Ain't Bad" (1978) | "Paradise by the Dashboard Light" (1978) |

Music video
- Video on YouTube

"Two Out of Three Ain't Bad" is a power ballad performed by the American musician Meat Loaf. It is a track off his 1977 album Bat Out of Hell, written by Jim Steinman. It spent 23 weeks on the Billboard Hot 100, peaking at No. 11, and earned a million-selling Gold single from the RIAA, eventually being certified platinum. It remains his second-highest-charting hit in the US, behind "I'd Do Anything for Love (But I Won't Do That)" (1993), and stands as one of his career signature tunes.

== Background ==
It was the final song written for the album. In a 2003 interview for the VH1 Ultimate Albums series, songwriter Jim Steinman recalled:

I remember Mimi Kennedy [a cast member of Jim's then-current musical Rhinegold] telling me, she said, you know, when I was probably complaining why no one liked my stuff and couldn't get a deal, she says, 'Well Steiny, your stuff is so complicated. Can't you write something simple?' And while she was saying that the oldies station was on the radio and it was playing that old Elvis song, 'I Want You, I Need,' whatever it was. 'I Want You, I Need You, I Love You', you know. I just started singing my own song but it was 'I Want You, I Need You, I Love You.' She said, 'Why don't you write something simple like that, "I want you, I need you, I love you"?' I said, 'Well I'll try.' I don't try to make them complicated. I remember going home and I tried so hard but the best I could do was: 'I want you, I need you but there ain't no way I'm ever gonna love you, don't be sad, 'cause two out of three ain't bad'. So it was still a twist but it was my closest to a simple song, and one Elvis could have done.

The backing band is basically Utopia, of which Todd Rundgren, Roger Powell, Kasim Sulton and John "Willie" Wilcox were all members.

A music video was shot for the single and received significant airplay on television video programs of the period, four years before MTV's debut.

Two mixes were created for the song. In the album mix, timed around 5:27, one can hear prominent Moog synthesizer embellishments by session keyboardist Roger Powell. The single mix, timed just under 4:00, downmixes the synthesizer considerably, in place of a much warmer and predominant string arrangement by Kenneth Ascher. This mix also edits out and removes the first lyrical bridge of the song which includes the line, "There ain't no Coupe de Ville hiding at the bottom of a Cracker Jack box", and does some overlapping, splicing and editing to seamlessly merge back into the second part of the lyrical bridge, starting with, "I can't lie, I can't tell you that I'm something I'm not". An additional edit in the last verse removes the lines, "And though I know I'll never get her out of my heart, she never loved me back, Ooh I know, well I remember how she left me on a stormy night, oh she kissed me and got out of our bed". Last, a song fade-out beginning in the middle of the ending chorus' second refrain is also featured, hence removing the full-circle lyrics of "Baby we can talk all night, but that ain't getting us nowhere", that both started and ended the song, in its full album-mix version.

The Japanese release changes the title of the song to use a percentage, translating it as "66% is good enough".

== Reception ==
Cash Box said that the "vocals are emotionally rendered" and the "lyric is interesting." Record World called it a "rambling but appealing single."

== Charts and certifications ==
=== Meat Loaf version ===
==== Weekly charts ====
| Chart (1977–1978) | Peak position |
|---|---|
| Australia (Kent Music Report) | 11 |
| Austria | 11 |
| Canada RPM Top Singles | 5 |
| Canada RPM Adult Contemporary | 6 |
| Ireland (IRMA) | 25 |
| New Zealand (RIANZ) | 9 |
| UK Singles (Official Charts) | 32 |
| US Billboard Hot 100 | 11 |
| US Adult Contemporary (Billboard) | 31 |
| US Cash Box Top 100 | 9 |

| Chart (1992) | Peak position |
|---|---|
| UK Singles (Official Charts) | 69 |

| Chart (2022) | Peak position |
|---|---|
| Global 200 (Billboard) | 158 |
| US Hot Rock & Alternative Songs (Billboard) | 16 |

==== Year-end charts ====
| Chart (1978) | Rank |
|---|---|
| Australia (Kent Music Report) | 92 |
| Canada RPM Top Singles | 16 |
| US Billboard Hot 100 | 30 |
| US Cash Box | 46 |

==== Certifications ====
| Region | Certification | Certified units/sales |
|---|---|---|
| Canada (Music Canada) | Gold | 40,000^{‡} |
| New Zealand (RMNZ) | Platinum | 30,000^{‡} |
| United Kingdom (BPI) | Gold | 400,000^{‡} |
| United States (RIAA) | Platinum | 1,000,000^{‡} |
^{‡} Sales+streaming figures based on certification alone.

=== Julian Austin version ===
| Chart (1998) | Peak position |
|---|---|
| Canada Country Singles (RPM) | 20 |

== Personnel (original Meat Loaf version) ==
- Meat Loaf – lead vocals
- Todd Rundgren – guitar, backing vocals
- Kasim Sulton – bass guitar
- Roy Bittan – piano
- Roger Powell – synthesizer
- John "Willie" Wilcox – drums
- Rory Dodd – additional backing vocals
- Strings arranged and conducted by Kenneth Ascher
