= Neverland Express =

Backing band of singer Meat Loaf

Meat Loaf's Neverland Express
- Origin: United States
- Genres: Rock; Wagnerian rock
- Years active: 1977–present
- Past members: Meat Loaf

Meat Loaf's Neverland Express is an American rotating backing band that previously worked with American singer Meat Loaf. The Neverland Express have continued touring with American singer Caleb Johnson.

== Band lineups ==
=== 1977–78 (Bat Out of Hell) ===
- Bob Kulick: lead guitars
- Bruce Kulick: guitars
- Steve Buslowe: bass, vocals
- Jim Steinman: piano, vocals
- Paul Glanz: keyboards, vocals
- Joe Stefko: drums
- Karla DeVito: female lead vocals
- Rory Dodd: vocals

=== 1981–82 ===
==== Dead Ringer ====
- Davey Johnstone: lead guitars
- Mark Doyle: guitars
- Steve Buslowe: bass, vocals
- Paul Jacobs: piano, vocals
- George Meyer: keyboards, vocals
- Terry Williams: drums
- Pamela Moore: female lead vocals
- Ted Neeley: vocals
- Eric Troyer: vocals

==== European Tour ====
- Mark Doyle: lead guitars
- Steve Hunter: guitars
- Steve Buslowe: bass, vocals
- Paul Jacobs: piano, vocals
- George Meyer: keyboards, vocals
- Terry Williams: drums
- Pamela Moore: female lead vocals
- Ted Neeley: vocals
- Eric Troyer: vocals

Note: George Borowski was the guitar tech during the '81/'82 period, but often played with the band onstage, especially during encores. By the end of the tour, he had become the opening act.

=== 1983 (Midnight at the Lost and Found) ===
- Bob Kulick: lead guitars
- Mark Doyle: guitars
- Steve Buslowe: bass, vocals
- Paul Jacobs: piano, vocals
- Wells Kelly: drums
- Kati Mac: female lead vocals

=== 1984–85 (Bad Attitude) ===
- Bob Kulick: lead guitars
- Paul Jacobs: guitars, piano, vocals
- John Golden: bass, vocals
- Brian Chatton: keyboards, vocals
- Andy Wells: drums
- Kati Mac: female lead vocals
- Doreen Chanter: vocals

=== 1986–88 ===
==== 20/20 World Tour [Blind Before I Stop] (1986–87) ====
- Bob Kulick: lead guitars
- Alan Merrill: guitars, vocals
- Steve Buslowe: bass, vocals
- Frank Doyle: keyboards
- Chuck Burgi: drums
- Amy Goff: female lead vocals
- Elaine Goff: vocals

==== Lost Boys and Golden Girls / Bat Out of Hell 10th Anniversary Tour (1988) ====
- Bob Kulick: lead guitars
- Alan Merrill: guitars, vocals
- Steve Buslowe: bass, vocals
- Domenic Cicchetti: keyboards
- Chuck Burgi: drums
- Amy Goff: female lead vocals
- Elaine Goff: vocals

Note: At one point in the 1988 tour, Stevie Lange filled in for one of the Goff sisters.

=== Pubs and Clubs 1989–1991 ===
==== Bandmembers ====
- guitars: Pat Thrall, Dave Gellis
- bass: Steve Buslowe
- piano: Mark Alexander
- keyboards: Mark Alexander, "Dominic Chichetti" (sic)
- drums: Chuck Burgi, John Miceli
- vocals: Amy Goff, Elaine Goff, Cindy Thrall

Note: Paul Jacobs played piano at some rehearsals in 1989.

=== 1993–97 ===
==== Everything Louder Tour (1993–94) ====
- Pat Thrall: lead guitars, vocals
- Kasim Sulton: guitars, keyboards, vocals
- Steve Buslowe: bass, vocals
- Mark Alexander : piano, vocals
- John Miceli: drums
- Patti Russo: female lead vocals
- Pearl Aday: vocals (summer of 1994 only)

==== Born to Rock Tour (1995–96) ====
- Pat Thrall: lead guitars, vocals
- Kasim Sulton: guitars, keyboards, vocals
- Steve Buslowe: bass, vocals
- Mark Alexander: piano, vocals
- John Miceli: drums
- Patti Russo: female lead vocals
- Pearl Aday: vocals

==== German Festival Tour (1997) ====
- Pat Thrall: lead guitars, vocals
- Kasim Sulton: guitars, keyboards, vocals
- Steve Buslowe: bass, vocals
- Mark Alexander: piano, vocals
- John Miceli: drums
- Patti Russo: female lead vocals
- Pearl Aday: female backing vocals

=== 1998–2000 (The Very Best Of Tour/ Storytellers Tour) ===
- Damon La Scot: lead guitars
- Ray Andersen: guitars, keyboards, vocals
- Kasim Sulton: bass, vocals
- Tom Brislin: piano, vocals
- John Miceli: drums
- Patti Russo: female lead vocals
- Pearl Aday: vocals

=== Night of the Proms 2001 ===
- Kasim Sulton: bass, vocals
- Mark Alexander: piano, vocals
- John Miceli: drums
- Patti Russo: female lead vocals
- Pearl Aday: vocals

=== 2002 (Just Having Fun Tour) ===
- Damon La Scot: lead guitars
- John Golden: guitars, keyboards, vocals
- Kasim Sulton: bass, vocals
- Mark Alexander: piano, vocals
- John Miceli: drums
- Patti Russo: female lead vocals
- Pearl Aday: vocals

=== Couldn't Have Said It Better 2003–04 ===
==== Concerts in Germany and Amsterdam ====
- Paul Crook: lead guitars
- John Golden: guitars, keyboards, vocals
- Kasim Sulton: bass, vocals
- Mark Alexander: piano, vocals
- John Miceli: drums
- Patti Russo: female lead vocals
- Pearl Aday: vocals (in Germany only)
- Sara Douglas: vocals (in Amsterdam only)

==== 2003–04 World Tour ====
- Paul Crook: lead guitars
- Randy Flowers: guitars, keyboards, vocals
- Kasim Sulton: bass, vocals
- Mark Alexander: piano, vocals
- John Miceli: drums
- Patti Russo: female lead vocals
- Renee Cologne: vocals

Note: Carolyn 'C.C' Coletti-Jablonski replaced Renee in Oct. 2003.

=== 2005–06 (Hair of the Dog Tour) ===
- Paul Crook: lead guitars
- Randy Flowers: guitars, keyboards, vocals
- Kasim Sulton: bass, vocals
- Mark Alexander: piano, vocals
- John Miceli: drums
- Patti Russo: female lead vocals
- Carolyn "C.C." Coletti–Jablonski: vocals

=== Seize the Night (3 Bats Live) 2007 ===
- Paul Crook: lead guitars
- Randy Flowers: guitars, vocals
- Kasim Sulton: bass, vocals
- Mark Alexander: piano, vocals
- Dave Luther: saxophones, keyboards, vocals
- John Miceli: drums
- Aspen Miller: female lead vocals
- Carolyn "C.C." Coletti–Jablonski: vocals

=== 2008 (Casa de Carne Tour) ===
- Paul Crook: lead guitars
- Randy Flowers: guitars, vocals
- Kasim Sulton: bass, vocals
- Mark Alexander: piano, vocals
- Dave Luther: saxophones, keyboards, vocals
- John Miceli: drums
- Patti Russo: female lead vocals
- Carolyn "C.C." Coletti–Jablonski: vocals

=== 2010–2013 ===
==== Hang Cool Tour ( 2010-2011) ====
- Paul Crook: lead guitars
- Randy Flowers: guitars, vocals
- Danny Miranda: bass, vocals
- Justin Avery: piano, vocals
- Dave Luther: saxophones, keyboards, vocals
- John Miceli: drums
- Patti Russo: female lead vocals
- Carolyn "C.C." Coletti–Jablonski: vocals (departed the band in Sept. 2010)

==== Hell in a Handbasket ====
===== Guilty Pleasure Tour (October 2011) =====
- Paul Crook: lead guitars
- Randy Flowers: guitars, vocals
- Danny Miranda: bass, vocals
- Justin Avery: piano, vocals
- Dave Luther: saxophones, keyboards, vocals
- Ginny Luke: violin, vocals
- John Miceli: drums
- Patti Russo: female lead vocals

==== Mad, Mad World/Last At Bat Tour (2012–13) ====
- Paul Crook: lead guitars
- Randy Flowers: guitars, vocals
- Danny Miranda: bass, vocals
- Justin Avery: piano, vocals
- Dave Luther: saxophones, keyboards, vocals
- John Miceli: drums
- Patti Russo: female lead vocals

Note: This was Patti Russo's final tour with the band, departing in July 2013.

=== RockTellz & CockTails 2013–2014 ===
- Paul Crook: lead guitars
- Randy Flowers: guitars, vocals
- Danny Miranda: bass, vocals
- Tish Diaz: piano, vocals
- Dave Luther: saxophones, keyboards, vocals
- John Miceli: drums
- Lyssa Lynne: vocals
- Stacy Michelle: vocals

Note: Cian Coey replaced Lyssa Lynne in 2014. Justin Avery replaced Tish Diaz in 2014.

=== 2015–16 (in concert) ===
- Paul Crook: lead guitars
- Randy Flowers: guitars, vocals
- Danny Miranda: bass, vocals
- Justin Avery: piano, vocals
- Dave Luther: saxophones, keyboards, vocals
- John Miceli: drums
- Cian Coey: vocals

=== Celebrating Meat Loaf 2021–present ===
- Caleb Johnson: lead vocals
- Paul Crook: lead guitars
- Randy Flowers: guitars, vocals
- Danny Miranda: bass, vocals
- Ed Avila: bass, vocals
- Andy Ascolese: piano, vocals
- Mark Klett: keyboards, vocals
- Joe Libretti: keyboards, vocals
- Dave Luther: saxophone
- John Miceli: drums
- Lyssa Lynne: vocals
- Kiley Faith Baxter: vocals

Note: Celebrating Meat Loaf announced Caleb Johnson's departure in January 2026. Andrew Polec, Travis Cormier, and Sam Pope, all formerly of Bat Out of Hell: The Musical, will alternate as lead vocalists.
