= Last at Bat Tour =

2013 concert tour by Meat Loaf

- Tour by Meat Loaf
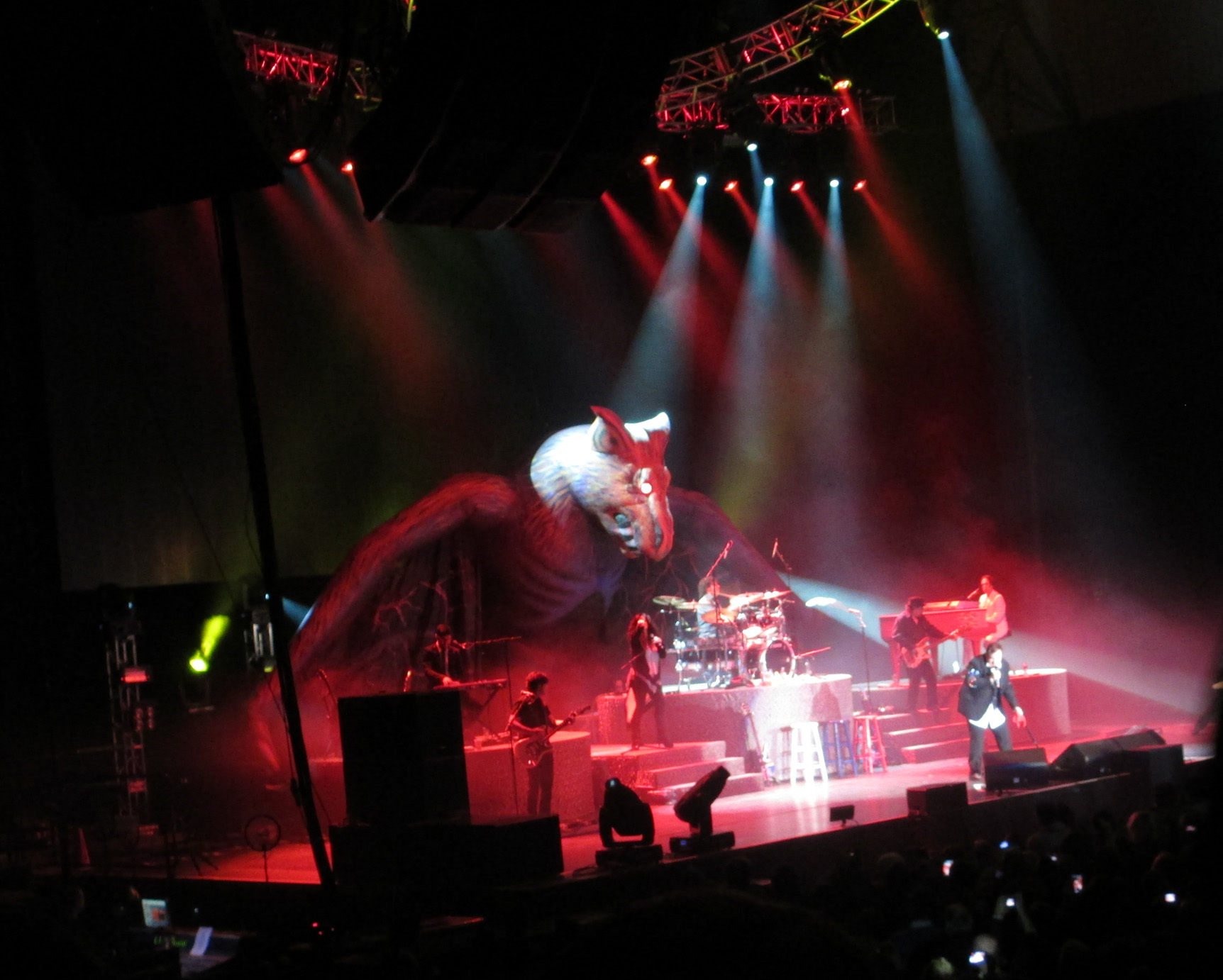
- An inflatable bat on stage during the Newcastle opening night
- Associated album: Bat Out of Hell (reissue); Hell in a Handbasket
- Start date: April 5, 2013
- End date: May 25, 2013
- Legs: 1
- No. of shows: 17 in Europe

Meat Loaf concert chronology
- Mad, Mad World Tour (2012); Last at Bat Tour (2013); Rocktellz & Cocktails (2013–2014)

Last at Bat was a Meat Loaf concert tour that played 17 dates in Europe during April and May 2013.

The first show was in Newcastle, England on 5 April 2013. The Nottingham performance was cancelled hours before it was due to begin, due to medical conditions affecting several members of the band. The Manchester performance was also cancelled for the same reason; both were rescheduled to 20 and 25 May respectively and made Manchester the final date of the tour.

== Tour dates ==
Date	City	Country	Venue	Notes
Europe
April 5, 2013	Newcastle	England	Metro Radio Arena	
April 7, 2013	Glasgow	Scotland	Scottish Exhibition and Conference Centre	
April 10, 2013	London	England	The O_{2} Arena	
April 12, 2013	Birmingham	England	LG Arena	
April 14, 2013	Nottingham	England	Capital FM Arena	Cancelled and rescheduled for May 20
April 17, 2013	Manchester	England	Manchester Arena	Cancelled and rescheduled for May 25
April 19, 2013	Sheffield	England	Motorpoint Arena Sheffield	
April 21, 2013	Cardiff	Wales	Motorpoint Arena Cardiff	
April 25, 2013	Frankfurt	Germany	Festhalle Frankfurt	
April 28, 2013	Berlin	Germany	O_{2} World Berlin	
April 30, 2013	Munich	Germany	Olympiahalle	
May 3, 2013	Stuttgart	Germany	Hanns-Martin-Schleyer-Halle	
May 5, 2013	Hamburg	Germany	O_{2} World Hamburg	
May 8, 2013	Oberhausen	Germany	König Pilsener Arena	
May 11, 2013	Zwolle	Netherlands	IJsselhallen	
May 14, 2013	Belfast	Northern Ireland	Odyssey Arena	
May 17, 2013	Dublin	Ireland	The O_{2}	
May 20, 2013	Nottingham	England	Capital FM Arena	Rescheduled from April 14
May 25, 2013	Manchester	England	Manchester Arena	Rescheduled from April 17

== Set List ==
Act one

The first act set includes some of Meat Loaf's greatest hits. The first act set lasts around 50 minutes. The band come on stage to the Beatles' "When I'm Sixty-Four".

1. "Runnin' for the Red Light (I Gotta Life)"
2. "Life Is a Lemon and I Want My Money Back"
3. "Dead Ringer for Love"
4. "If It Ain't Broke, Break It"
5. "Los Angeloser"
6. "The Giving Tree" / "Palome"
7. "Objects in the Rear View Mirror May Appear Closer than They Are"
8. "Out of the Frying Pan (And into the Fire)"

Act two

The second act set is the Bat Out of Hell album performed in full and in order.

1. "Bat Out of Hell"
2. "You Took the Words Right Out of My Mouth"
3. "Heaven Can Wait"
4. "All Revved Up with No Place to Go"
5. "Two Out of Three Ain't Bad"
6. "Paradise by the Dashboard Light"
7. "For Crying Out Loud"

Encore

1. "I'd Do Anything for Love (But I Won't Do That)" (Abridged version)
2. "Boneyard" / "Free Bird" / "All Revved Up With No Place to Go"

== Band ==
- Meat Loaf – lead vocals
- Patti Russo – female lead vocals
- John Miceli – drums
- Paul Crook – guitar
- Randy Flowers – guitar, backing vocals
- Dave Luther – saxophone, keyboards, backing vocals
- Danny Miranda – bass, backing vocals
- Justin Avery – piano, backing vocals
