= Mad, Mad World Tour =

2012 concert tour by Meat Loaf

- Tour by Meat Loaf
- Location: Mexico; U.S.
- Associated album: Hell in a Handbasket
- Start date: June 22, 2012
- End date: September 2, 2012
- No. of shows: 27

Meat Loaf concert chronology
- Guilty Pleasure Tour (2011); Mad, Mad World Tour (2012); Last at Bat Tour (2013)

The Mad, Mad World Tour was a concert tour by American singer Meat Loaf that started on June 22, 2012 in Austin, Texas, and concluded on October 19, 2012 in Uncasville, Connecticut. The tour was in support of his Hell in a Handbasket album.

== Tour dates ==
List of concerts
Date	City	Country	Venue
June 22, 2012	Austin	United States	ACL Live at the Moody Theater
June 24, 2012	Mexico City	Mexico	Pepsi Centre WTC
June 27, 2012	Los Angeles	United States	Wiltern Theatre
June 30, 2012	Snoqualmie	United States	Snoqualmie Casino
July 2, 2012	Eagle	United States	Eagle River Pavilion
July 7, 2012	Valley Center	United States	Harrah's Rincon
July 17, 2012	Montclair	United States	Wellmont Theatre
July 19, 2012	New Brunswick	United States	State Theatre NJ
July 21, 2012	Hopewell	United States	CMAC Arts Center
July 23, 2012	Englewood	United States	Bergen Performing Arts Center
July 25, 2012	Bethlehem	United States	Sands Bethlehem Event Center
July 27, 2012	Atlantic City	United States	House of Blues Atlantic City
July 29, 2012	Niagara Falls	United States	Seneca Allegany Casino Events Center
July 31, 2012	Boston	United States	Bank of America Pavilion
August 2, 2012	Upper Darby Township	United States	Tower Theater
August 15, 2012	Clearwater	United States	Ruth Eckerd Hall
August 17, 2012	Durham	United States	Durham Performing Arts Center
August 19, 2012	Biloxi	United States	IP Casino Resort & Spa
August 21, 2012	Hershey	United States	Hershey Theatre
August 24, 2012	Hammond	United States	The Venue at Horseshoe Casino
August 26, 2012	Milwaukee	United States	Riverside Theater
August 29, 2012	Nashville	United States	Ryman Auditorium
August 31, 2012	Robinsonville	United States	Horseshoe Casino Tunica
September 2, 2012	Bossier City	United States	Horseshoe Bossier City
October 19, 2012	Prior Lake	United States	Mystic Lake Casino
October 19, 2012	Uncasville	United States	Mohegan Sun Arena
October 21, 2012	Cedar Falls	United States	McLeod Center

Cancellations and rescheduled shows

August 4, 2012	North Bay, Canada	North Bay Waterfront Park	Part of "North Bay Summer in the Park Festival", cancelled due to bad weather

== Setlist ==
1. Runnin' For the Red Light
2. Dead Ringer For Love
3. If It Ain't Broke, Break It
4. Stand in the Storm
5. Paradise By the Dashboard Light
6. Living on the Outside
7. Los Angeloser
8. You Took the Words Right Out of My Mouth
9. The Giving Tree
10. Mad, Mad World
11. Our Love and Our Souls
12. Two Out Of Three Ain't Bad
13. Rock n' Roll Dreams Come Through
14. Bat Out of Hell
15. I'd Do Anything For Love (But I Won't Do That)
16. Boneyard/ Freebird/ All Revved Up With No Place To Go (At Durham concert 2/3 Ain't Bad)

== Band ==
- Meat Loaf: lead vocals
- Patti Russo: female lead vocals
- John Miceli: drums
- Paul Crook: guitar
- Randy Flowers: guitar, backing vocals
- Dave Luther: saxophone, keyboards, backing vocals
- Danny Miranda: bass, backing vocals
- Justin Avery: piano, backing vocals
