= Guilty Pleasure Tour =

2011 concert tour by Meat Loaf

- Tour by Meat Loaf
- Associated album: Hell in a Handbasket, Hang Cool Teddy Bear
- Start date: October 1, 2011
- End date: October 29, 2011
- Legs: 1
- No. of shows: 12

Meat Loaf concert chronology
- The Hang Cool Tour (2010–2011); Guilty Pleasure Tour (2011); Mad, Mad World Tour (2012)

Guilty Pleasure Tour is a concert tour by American rock musician Meat Loaf in support of his 2011 album Hell in a Handbasket. The tour only visited Australia and New Zealand; more dates were expected to be announced for mainland Europe and North America, but did not eventuate. The show in Sydney was filmed for DVD release. Meat Loaf has said that the tour's name came from a poll, which named him the number one "guilty pleasure". During the concerts, Meat Loaf announced to his fans that these concerts would be the "last he ever performed in Australia and New Zealand" and added a thank you to the fans for "38 years of support" for the duration of his career.

== Tour dates ==
| Date | City | Country | Venue |
Oceania
| October 1, 2011 | Melbourne | Australia | Melbourne Cricket Ground |
| October 4, 2011 | Wollongong | Australia | Wollongong Entertainment Centre |
| October 6, 2011 | Brisbane | Australia | Brisbane Entertainment Centre |
| October 8, 2011 | Hunter Valley | Australia | Hope Valley Winery |
| October 12, 2011 | Sydney | Australia | Sydney Entertainment Centre |
| October 14, 2011 | Melbourne | Australia | Rod Laver Arena |
| October 15, 2011 | Yarra Valley | Australia | Rochford Winery |
| October 19, 2011 | Adelaide | Australia | Adelaide Entertainment Centre |
| October 22, 2011 | Perth | Australia | Perth Oval |
| October 26, 2011 | Wellington | New Zealand | TSB Bank Arena |
| October 28, 2011 | Tauranga | New Zealand | Baypark Arena |
| October 29, 2011 | Auckland | New Zealand | Vector Arena |

== Set list ==
=== Brisbane, Queensland ===
1. "Hot Patootie – Bless My Soul"/"Time Warp"
2. "If It Ain't Broke, Break It"
3. "Bat Out of Hell"
4. "Peace on Earth"
5. "Living on the Outside"
6. "Los Angeloser"
7. "You Took the Words Right Out of My Mouth (Hot Summer Night)"
8. "Rock and Roll Dreams Come Through"
9. "Stand in the Storm"
10. "I'd Do Anything for Love (But I Won't Do That)"
11. "Two Out of Three Ain't Bad"
12. "Paradise by the Dashboard Light"

Encore:

13. "Boneyard"/"Freebird"/"All Revved Up" medley
14. "Mercury Blues"

== Reception ==
Meat Loaf's performance at the 2011 AFL Grand Final was widely criticised by fans and critics alike, with the Sunday Herald Sun saying that "Meat Loaf, 64, failed to hit the high notes and mumbled into the microphone throughout a 12-minute medley, which included hits 'Bat Out of Hell' and 'I Would Do Anything for Love'. His lacklustre performance and high price tag, in excess of $500,000, has been widely criticised." AFL chief executive Andrew Demetriou said, "I actually think that the pre-match (entertainment) was a bit flat overall and probably, maybe in part due to the weather as well, it just didn't seem to be as much atmosphere going on before the game regardless of who was playing, but anyway, Meat Loaf gave it his best." However, at the concert at the Entertainment Centre in Sydney (which will appear on the Guilty Pleasure DVD), Meat Loaf commented on his appearance at the AFL Grand Final and exclaimed that his bad performance was due to audio problems, as he "couldn't hear a thing".

His shows in Wollongong and Brisbane were much better received, with the Illawarra Mercury commenting that "American rocker Meat Loaf last night appeared to have shaken off his dire performance at Saturday's AFL grand final, delivering an impassioned, hit-laden show at WIN Entertainment Centre. The 64-year-old had the crowd on their feet for much of the two-hour gig, kicking off with the song 'Hot Patootie – Bless My Soul' from the classic movie Rocky Horror Picture Show, in which the singer starred. The vocal troubles which plagued him during Saturday's performance appeared to have dissipated somewhat, although the star was far from pitch perfect in some of the more challenging songs."

== Band ==
- Meat Loaf: lead vocals
- Patti Russo: female lead vocals
- John Miceli: drums
- Paul Crook: guitar
- Randy Flowers: guitar, backing vocals
- Dave Luther: saxophone, keyboards, backing vocals
- Danny Miranda: bass, backing vocals
- Justin Avery: piano, backing vocals
- Ginny Luke: violin, backing vocals

== Release ==
UK-based record company The Store for Music released the Guilty Pleasure Tour in a deluxe DVD/CD edition on October 1, 2012, in the UK and Europe. The set included a bonus documentary.

DVD

1. "Hot Patootie"/"Time Warp"
2. "If It Ain't Broke, Break It"
3. "Bat Out of Hell"
4. "Peace on Earth"
5. "Living on the Outside"
6. "Los Angeloser"
7. "You Took the Words"
8. "Rock and Roll Dreams"
9. "Stand in the Storm"
10. "Anything for Love"
11. "Two Out of Three Ain't Bad"
12. "Paradise by the Dashboard Light"
13. "Boneyard"/"All Revved Up"

CD

1. "Hot Patootie"/"Time Warp"
2. "If It Ain't Broke, Break It"
3. "Bat Out of Hell"
4. "Peace on Earth"
5. "Los Angeloser"
6. "You Took the Words"
7. "Stand in the Storm"
8. "Anything for Love"
9. "Two Out of Three Ain't Bad"
10. "Boneyard"/"All Revved Up"
