= What You See Is What You Get (song) =

1971 single by Stoney & Meatloaf

"What You See is What You Get"

Single by Stoney & Meatloaf

from the album Stoney and Meatloaf
- B-side: "Lady Be Mine"
- Released: April 1971
- Recorded: 1971
- Length: 2:15
- Label: Rare Earth
- Songwriters: Patti Jerome; Mike Valvano
- Producers: Ralph Terrana; Russ Terrana; Mike Valvano

Stoney & Meatloaf singles chronology
"What You See is What You Get" (1971)	"It Takes All Kinds of People" (1971)

"What You See is What You Get" is the debut single by American duo Stoney & Meatloaf. It was released in April 1971 as the lead single from their only album, Stoney and Meatloaf (1971).

== Background ==
The Jackson 5 originally planned to record the song then considered for The Supremes, but it was offered to Stoney & Meatloaf, which prompted the duo to sign with Motown.

Andrew Hamlin of AllMusic described the song to be "foreshadowing" the songwriting style of Meat Loaf's future collaborator Jim Steinman (i.e. "song-weaving from cliché").

== Charts ==
"What You See Is What You Get"
Chart (1971)	Position
US Billboard Hot 100	71
