= Stoney & Meatloaf =

Studio album by Stoney & Meatloaf
- Released: October 1971
- Recorded: 1971
- Genre: Psychedelic soul
- Length: 34:54
- Label: Rare Earth
- Producer: Ralph Terrana, Russ Terrana, Mike Valvano

Meat Loaf chronology
Stoney & Meatloaf (1971)	Bat Out of Hell (1977)

Shaun Murphy chronology
Stoney & Meatloaf (1971)	Livin' the Blues (2009)

Alternate cover
- 1978 reissue cover.

Stoney and Meatloaf is the only album by Stoney & Meatloaf, a collaboration between Meat Loaf and female vocalist Shaun Murphy, released in 1971 on the Motown subsidiary label Rare Earth. Meat Loaf and Murphy met while performing with the Detroit cast of Hair.

== Re-releases ==
The album was re-released several times with a different track listing under the title Featuring Stoney and Meat Loaf. Firstly in 1978 and 1979 on the Prodigal label (PDL 2010) and again in 1986 on Tamla Motown (ZL 72217). The album contained most (but not all) of the tracks on the original album; "(I'd Love to Be) As Heavy as Jesus" and "Game of Love" were not on the reissue. In addition to three new tracks ("Stone Heart", "Who is the Leader of the People" and "Everything Under the Sun"), some songs appear in different versions and in some cases, different song titles.

The album is being released on CD for the first time in remastered two-disc form by Real Gone Music and Second Disc Records in 2022. The release will contain a selection of bonus tracks including new mixes of the additional songs originally released on the 1978 reissue of the album, as well as both sides of Stoney's solo single for Motown, and unreleased outtakes from Stoney's solo sessions.

"What You See Is What You Get" is the first single by duo Stoney & Meatloaf. It was released ahead of the release of the duo's only album Stoney & Meatloaf in 1971. The song peaked on the R&B chart at number 36.

== Reception ==
Professional ratings
Review scores
Source	Rating
AllMusic	2.5/5 stars

Louder ranked Stoney & Meatloaf as the sixth best Meat Loaf album, calling it a "minor gem" and "a frothy stew of brass and thunder". Although Allmusic deemed the songs to be "second-tier", the singers' performances were praised, and the site said the album was "Worth picking up for a buck or two out of a used bin".

== Other releases of Stoney & Meatloaf material ==
The track "(I'd Love to Be) As Heavy as Jesus" was included in the 1971 Motown gospel compilation Rock Gospel: The Key to the Kingdom, alongside tracks by label stars The Supremes, Valerie Simpson, Marvin Gaye, The Jackson 5, Gladys Knight & the Pips and others.

== Track listing ==
=== 1971 original release ===
Side one
No.	Title	Writer(s)	Length
1.	"(I'd Love to Be) As Heavy as Jesus"	Patti Jerome, Ralph Terrana, Mike Valvano	2:54
2.	"She Waits by the Window"	Mike Campbell, Ray Monette	4:07
3.	"It Takes All Kinds of People"	Jerome, Valvano	2:23
4.	"Game of Love"	Ike Turner	3:50
5.	"Kiss Me Again"	Campbell, Monette	5:08

Side two
No.	Title	Writer(s)	Length
6.	"What You See Is What You Get"	Jerome, Valvano	2:15
7.	"Sunshine (Where's Heaven?)"	Terrana, Valvano	3:02
8.	"Jimmy Bell"	Traditional	3:48
9.	"Lady Be Mine"	Campbell, Monette	4:44
10.	"Jessica White"	Campbell, Monette	2:43

Producers: Ralph Terrana, Russ Terrana, Mike Valvano
Arrangers: Tom Baird and David Van De Pitte

=== 1978/1979 re-release Meat Loaf featuring Stoney and Meatloaf ===
Side one
No.	Title	Writer(s)	Length
1.	"Jimmy Bell"	Traditional	5:14
2.	"She Waits by the Window"	Campbell, Monette	4:07
3.	"It Takes All Kinds of People"	Patti Jerome, Mike Valvano	2:23
4.	"Stone Heart"	Campbell, Monette	2:57
5.	"Who Is the Leader of the People?"	Dino Fekaris, Nick Zesses	4:15

Side two
No.	Title	Writer(s)	Length
6.	"What You See Is What You Get"	Jerome, Valvano	2:15
7.	"Kiss Me Again"	Campbell, Monette	4:14
8.	"Sunshine (Where's Heaven?)"	Terrana, Valvano	3:02
9.	"Jessica White"	Campbell, Monette	2:43
10.	"Lady Be Mine"	Campbell, Monette	4:44
11.	"Everything Under the Sun"	Campbell, Monette	2:43

- Producers: Ralph Terrana, Russ Terrana, Mike Valvano
- Producers on "Who Is the Leader of the People?": Nick Zesses and Dino Fekaris
- Arrangers: Tom Baird and David Van De Pitte
- Remixed and remastered at Motown Recording Studios, Hollywood, California
- Remix engineer: Glen Jordan
- Mastering engineer: Jack Andrews

=== 2022 re-release Everything Under the Sun: The Motown Sessions ===
Disc one
No.	Title	Writer(s)	Length
1.	"(I'd Love to Be) As Heavy As Jesus"	Patti Jerome, Ralph Terrana, Mike Valvano
2.	"She Waits By the Window"	Mike Campbell, Ray Monette
3.	"It Takes All Kinds of People"	Patti Jerome, Mike Valvano
4.	"Game of Love"	Ike Turner
5.	"Kiss Me Again"	Campbell, Monette
6.	"What You See Is What You Get"	Patti Jerome, Mike Valvano
7.	"Sunshine (Where's Heaven)"	Ralph Terrana, Mike Valvano
8.	"Jimmy Bell"	Traditional
9.	"Lady Be Mine"	Campbell, Monette
10.	"Jessica White"	Campbell, Monette
11.	"What You See Is What You Get (Mono Single Version)"	Patti Jerome, Mike Valvano
12.	"Lady Be Mine (Mono Single Version)"	Campbell, Monette
13.	"It Takes All Kinds of People (Mono Single Version)"	Patti Jerome, Mike Valvano
14.	"The Way You Do the Things You Do (Mono Single Version)"	Smokey Robinson, Robert Rogers

Disc two
No.	Title	Writer(s)	Length
1.	"Let Me Come Down Easy (Stoney Single Version)"	Nick Zesses, Dino Fekaris
2.	"It's Always Me (Stoney Single Version)"	Beatrice Verdi, Nick Zesses, Dino Fekaris
3.	"Carry Me (Stoney Solo Outtake)"
4.	"A Woman Left Lonely (Stoney Solo Outtake)"
5.	"Mo Jo Hannah (Stoney Solo Outtake)"
6.	"Stone Liberty (Stoney Solo Outtake)"
7.	"Sunshine (Where's Heaven) (Stoney Solo Version)"	Ralph Terrana, Mike Valvano
8.	"Touch and Go (Stoney Solo Outtake)"
9.	"The Way You Do the Things You Do (2022 Stereo Mix)"	Smokey Robinson, Robert Rogers
10.	"Everything Under the Sun (2022 Mix)"	Campbell, Monette
11.	"Stone Heart (2022 Mix)"	Mike Campbell, Ray Monette
12.	"Who Is the Leader of the People (2022 Mix)"	Dino Fekaris, Nick Zesses
13.	"Jimmy Bell (2022 Mix)"	Traditional
14.	"It Takes All Kinds of People (2022 Mix)"	Patti Jerome, Mike Valvano

== Personnel ==
- Lead vocals: Meat Loaf, Stoney Murphy
- Backing vocals: Mike Campbell, Telma Hopkins, Joyce Vincent
- Instrumentation by The Funk Brothers, Scorpion (Bob Babbitt, Mike Campbell, Ray Monette and Andrew Smith) and Ralph Terrana
  - Instrumentation on "Game of Love" and "Jimmy Bell": Charlie Irwin, Richard Ponte, Jim Simmons and Scott Strong

== Singles ==
- "What You See Is What You Get" (b/w "Lady Be Mine" [Edit])
- "It Takes All Kinds of People" (b/w "The Way You Do the Things You Do")

== Charts ==
Chart (1979)	Peak position
Dutch Albums (Album Top 100)	25
