= Soul Searchers =

Soul Searchers or The Soul Searchers may also refer to

- Jake Wade and the Soul Searchers, a funk band from the 1970s
- The Soul Searchers, a US soul band with Chuck Brown
- The Soul Searchers (Canadian group), a soul group originating in Toronto in the mid 1960s
- The Soul Searchers (US West Coast group), a backing group for singer Richard Berry
