= Bat Out of Hell: Live with the Melbourne Symphony Orchestra =

2004 live album by Meat Loaf

Bat out of Hell Live

Live album by Meat Loaf
- Released: September 28, 2004
- Recorded: Melbourne, Australia
- Genre: Hard rock, progressive rock, symphonic rock
- Length: 55:09/66:14
- Label: Mercury, Sanctuary
- Producer: Aernout Kerbert, Richard Whitehouse, Peter Mokran

Meat Loaf chronology
Couldn't Have Said It Better (2003)	Bat out of Hell Live (2004)	Bat Out of Hell III: The Monster Is Loose (2006)

Bat out of Hell: Live with the Melbourne Symphony Orchestra is a live album released by singer Meat Loaf in 2004 on the Mercury and Sanctuary labels.

The album was recorded on February 20-February 22, 2004 during Meat Loaf's Australian tour. Meat Loaf is backed for the concerts by the Melbourne Symphony Orchestra. As the name suggests, the album contains live performances of the seven tracks off Meat Loaf's 1977 album, Bat Out of Hell. The Australian and limited edition versions of the album also contain a performance of "I Would Do Anything for Love (But I Won't Do That)" in addition to the track "Couldn't Have Said It Better" and a bonus DVD for the limited edition.

== Track listing ==
All compositions by Jim Steinman except where noted.

1. "Bat out of Hell" – 11:48
2. "You Took the Words Right Out of My Mouth (Hot Summer Night)" – 5:16
3. "Heaven Can Wait" – 5:09
4. "All Revved Up with No Place to Go" – 5:22
5. "Two Out of Three Ain't Bad" – 5:42
6. "Paradise by the Dashboard Light" – 11:07
7. "For Crying Out Loud" – 10:45
8. "I'd Do Anything for Love (But I Won't Do That)" – 11:05 (Australian and limited edition only)
9. "Couldn't Have Said It Better" (James Michael, Nikki Sixx) – 8:13 (limited edition only)

== Limited edition bonus DVD ==
All compositions by Jim Steinman except where noted.

1. "Two Out of Three Ain't Bad" – 8:44 (live video)
2. "Couldn't Have Said It Better" – 5:44 (Michael, Sixx) (original music video)
3. "Did I Say That?" – 4:52 (Michael) (original music video)
4. Photogallery
5. "I'd Lie for You [And That's the Truth]" - 5:06 [Audio only] (Diane Warren)
6. "Rock and Roll Dreams Come Through" – 6:32 [audio only]
7. "Dead Ringer for Love" – 5:17 [audio only]

== DVD version ==
Live with the Melbourne Symphony Orchestra

Video by Meat Loaf
- Released: 2004
- Recorded: February 20 and 22, 2004
- Genre: Hard rock, symphonic rock
- Label: Warner Music Vision
- Director: Michael Simon

Meat Loaf chronology
VH1: Storytellers (1999)	Live with the Melbourne Symphony Orchestra (2004)	3 Bats Live (2007)

Its DVD release had extra songs from the concert not on the CD. It is missing "Heaven Can Wait", "I'd Lie For You (And That's The Truth)" and "Rock and Roll Dreams Come Through" which were recorded as soundchecks.

=== Tracks ===
All compositions by Jim Steinman except where noted.

1. "Life Is a Lemon and I Want My Money Back" — 09:34
2. "Mercury Blues" — 07:52 (K. C. Douglas, Robert L. Geddins)
3. "Dead Ringer for Love" — 06:08
4. "Testify" — 07:43 (Kevin Griffin)
5. "All Revved Up with No Place to Go" — 07:15
6. "You Took the Words Right Out of My Mouth (Hot Summer Night)" — 09:17
7. "Couldn't Have Said It Better" — 08:34 (James Michael, Nikki Sixx)
8. "Two Out of Three Ain't Bad" — 08:40
9. "Out of the Frying Pan (And Into the Fire)" — 11:58
10. "For Crying Out Loud" — 12:33
11. "Paradise by the Dashboard Light" — 19:19
12. "I'd Do Anything for Love (But I Won't Do That)" — 11:59
13. "Bat out of Hell" — 12:37

== Personnel ==
Musical director — Kasim Sulton

- Meat Loaf — vocals, guitar
- Patti Russo — lead female vocals
- Paul Crook — lead guitars
- Randy Flowers — guitars, keyboards, backing vocals
- Kasim Sulton — bass, backing vocals
- Mark Alexander— keyboards, backing vocals
- John Miceli — drums
- The Australian Boys Choir — backing vocals
- C.C. Coletti — backing vocals
- The Melbourne Symphony Orchestra, conducted by Keith Levenson

== Charts ==
Chart (2004)	Peak position
German Albums (Offizielle Top 100)	81
Irish Albums (IRMA)	69
Scottish Albums (OCC)	10
UK Albums (OCC)	14

== Certifications ==
Region	Certification	Certified units/sales
Australia (ARIA) Video certification	Gold	7,500^{^}
United Kingdom (BPI)	Gold	100,000^{*}
United Kingdom (BPI) Video certification	Platinum	50,000^{*}
^{*} Sales figures based on certification alone.^{^} Shipments figures based on certification alone.
