= Livin' the Blues =

Livin' The Blues

Studio album by Shaun Murphy
- Released: September 2009
- Studio: The Colemine Studios
- Genre: Blues
- Length: 59:00
- Label: Vision Wall Records
- Producer: Randy Coleman

Shaun Murphy chronology
Stoney & Meatloaf (1971)	Livin' The Blues (2009)

Livin' The Blues is an album recorded by The Shaun Murphy Band, released in September 2009. It was the first release by Shaun Murphy after leaving Little Feat in February 2009.

The album was recorded at The Colemine Studios and produced by Randy Coleman.

== Track listing ==
1. "Ocean of Tears" (Wyche, McRea) - 4:16
2. "Someone Else Is Steppin' In" (Denise Lasalle) - 4:29
3. "It Takes a Lot to Laugh, It Takes a Train to Cry" (Bob Dylan) - 5:25
4. "Livin' The Blues" (J. Cotton, A. Russell, D. Jones, C. Anderson) - 3:10
5. "That's a Pretty Good Love" (Bryant Lucas, Fred Mendelsohn) - 3:53
6. "Come to Mama" (Willie Mitchell, Earl Randle) - 5:04
7. "Love to Burn" (Dobie Gray, Ricky Rector, Bud Reneau) - 2:58
8. "I Still Believe in the Blues" (Joel Evans) - 3:57
9. "You're Taking Up Another Man's Place" (Isaac Hayes, David Porter) - 6:49
10. "Can't No Grave Hold My Body Down" (Mike Farris) - 4:13
11. "Hound Dog" (Jerry Leiber, Mike Stoller) - 3:15
12. "Rock and Roll Everynight" (Bill Payne, Bill Wray, Paul Barrere, Shaun Murphy, Fred Tackett) - 4:31
13. "It Feels Like Rain" (John Hiatt) - 6:33

== Shaun Murphy Band personnel ==
- Shaun Murphy - lead vocals
- Randy Coleman - bass guitar, vocals
- Kenne Cramer - guitar, vocals
- Larry Van Loon - keyboards, vocals
- Mike Caputy - drums

== Additional musicians ==
- Piero Mariani - percussion on "Ocean Of Tears", "That's A Pretty Good Love", "Come To Mama", "Love To Burn" and "It Feels Like Rain"
- Tim Gonzalez - harmonica on "Come To Mama"
