= Braver Than We Are =

Studio album by Meat Loaf
- Released: September 9, 2016
- Recorded: February – June 2016
- Genre: Rock
- Length: 55:20
- Labels: Caroline International S&D; 429
- Producer: Paul Crook

Meat Loaf chronology
Hell in a Handbasket (2011)	Braver Than We Are (2016)

Singles from Braver Than We Are
- 1. "Going All the Way" Released: June 29, 2016; 2. "Speaking in Tongues" Released: August 8, 2016

Professional ratings
Aggregate scores
Source	Rating
Metacritic	70/100
Review scores
Source	Rating
AllMusic	3.5/5 stars
The Arts Desk	2/5 stars
Classic Rock (de)	7/10
The Independent	2/5 stars
Loudersound	4/5 stars
Metal Hammer (de)	3/7
Mojo	3/5 stars
Q	4/5 stars
Record Collector	3/5 stars
Under the Radar	6.5/10 stars

Braver Than We Are is the twelfth and final studio album by American singer Meat Loaf, released in Europe on September 9, 2016, by Caroline International S&D and released in the United States on September 16, 2016 by 429 Records.

It is the last album for both songwriter Jim Steinman and Meat Loaf before their respective deaths in April 2021 and January 2022.

== Background ==
Meat Loaf first announced that he had begun working with Jim Steinman again on The Jonathan Ross Show in April 2013. "We've been communicating back and forth for the last six months every day by email," he explained to Jonathan Ross. At this time, Steinman was only contributing two songs to the album, though Meat Loaf was hoping he would contribute a third song. "We've cut three tracks, we're getting ready to cut three more, and then we'll hopefully cut three with Steinman." He had planned to begin working with Steinman in January 2014, with an expected release of September later that year.

Ellen Foley and Karla DeVito were approached to record duets on the album. In September 2013, Meat Loaf told BroadwayWorld that he would—with Steinman's approval—like to record duets with Bonnie Tyler and Lorraine Crosby as well.

Ultimately, all the songs were written or co-written by Steinman. The record's producer, Paul Crook, commented that "although there's been Bat 1, Bat 2 and Bat 3 completed, I believe this is actually Bat 3. I'm gonna say that. I might get myself in trouble, but I'm gonna say that. Jim's involvement in this record is so intense. The songs, the way they run together and the narrative of the record, nothing has been this cohesive since Bat 1."

== Content ==
"Loving You's a Dirty Job" first appeared on Bonnie Tyler's 1986 album Secret Dreams and Forbidden Fire. The song "More" first appeared on The Sisters of Mercy's 1990 album Vision Thing. The album includes a reunion with vocalists Ellen Foley and Karla DeVito (vocalists from the studio and live versions of "Paradise by the Dashboard Light", respectively) on the song "Going All the Way". All songs can be traced back to earlier Jim Steinman projects such as his musicals The Dream Engine and Neverland, which were also sources for songs used in earlier Meat Loaf albums.

A 'bonus edition' of the album, sold at various chains like Target, Tesco and Media Markt contains three exclusive bonus tracks. The same tracks are included in the Japanese edition.

== Title and artwork ==
The original title for the album was announced as Brave & Crazy, but was subsequently changed to Braver Than We Are, the title of a song originally composed by Jim Steinman for the musical Dance of the Vampires, which was rewritten and recorded for this album as "Going All the Way (A Song in 6 Movements)". The cover art was painted by Julie Bell.

== Release and promotion ==
Amazon users who pre-ordered the digital release of Braver Than We Are could download "Souvenirs" and "Train of Love" immediately. The majority of the album, minus "Skull of Your Country", was accidentally leaked on Apple Music on June 22, 2016, and was subsequently taken down after several hours.

== Track listing ==
All tracks are written by Jim Steinman, except where noted.

Standard edition
No.	Title	Writer(s)	Length
1.	"Who Needs the Young"		5:27
2.	"Going All the Way (A Song in 6 Movements)" (featuring Ellen Foley and Karla DeVito)	Steinman; Don Black	11:28
3.	"Speaking in Tongues" (featuring Stacy Michelle)		4:24
4.	"Loving You Is a Dirty Job (But Somebody's Gotta Do It)" (featuring Stacy Michelle)		6:09
5.	"Souvenirs"		8:17
6.	"Only When I Feel"		1:56
7.	"More"	Steinman; Andrew Eldritch	6:07
8.	"Godz"		3:34
9.	"Skull of Your Country" (featuring Cian Coey)		3:35
10.	"Train of Love"		4:23
Total length:			55:20

Bonus Edition and Japanese bonus tracks
No.	Title	Writer(s)	Length
11.	"For What It's Worth" (featuring Stephen Stills)	Stills	3:20
12.	"Prize Fight Lover"	Rick Brantley; Dave Bassett; Tommy Henriksen	5:35
13.	"I Would Do Anything for Love (But I Won't Do That)" (orchestral version featuring Imelda May)		10:18
Total length:			74:33

iTunes edition bonus tracks
No.	Title	Writer(s)	Length
11.	"I Would Do Anything for Love (But I Won't Do That)" (songwriter demo)		10:24
12.	"Dirty Water" (songwriter demo)		4:36
13.	"Prize Fight Lover" (songwriter demo)	Brantley; Bassett; Henriksen	5:26
14.	"Who Needs the Young" (songwriter demo)		4:28
15.	"Going All the Way" (radio edit)	Steinman; Black	4:20
Total length:			84:31

Amazon deluxe edition DVD
No.	Title	Length
1.	"Behind the Scenes: Making of Braver Than We Are"	20:00
Total length:		85:17

== Personnel ==
- Produced, mixed and engineered by Paul Crook
- Creative consultant – Jim Steinman
- Additional engineering – John Miceli, Pat Thrall, Steve Rinkoff
- Mastering engineer – Maor Appelbaum

=== Arrangements ===
- Arranged by Jim Steinman, Meat Loaf and Paul Crook
- Horn arrangements – David Luther
- Backing vocal arrangements – Justin Avery

=== Band ===
- Meat Loaf – vocals

==== The Neverland Express ====
- Paul Crook – guitar, loops, synths
- Danny Miranda – bass guitar
- Randy Flowers – guitars, vocals
- Justin Avery – piano, synth, strings
- David Luther – saxophone, B3 organ, strings
- John Miceli – drums
- Stacy Michelle – featured vocals (3, 4)
- Cian Coey – featured vocals (9)

==== Guest performers ====
- Ellen Foley – featured vocals (2)
- Karla DeVito – featured vocals (2)
- Rickey Medlocke – slide guitar solo (10)

==== Studio musicians ====
- Alicia Avery – backing vocals

== Charts ==
Chart performance for Braver Than We Are
Chart (2016)	Peak position
Australian Albums (ARIA)	17
Austrian Albums (Ö3 Austria)	27
Belgian Albums (Ultratop Flanders)	9
Belgian Albums (Ultratop Wallonia)	67
Canadian Albums (Billboard)	78
Dutch Albums (Album Top 100)	13
German Albums (Offizielle Top 100)	7
Irish Albums (IRMA)	43
New Zealand Heatseekers Albums (RMNZ)	3
Scottish Albums (Official Charts)	5
Spanish Albums (Promusicae)	63
Swiss Albums (Schweizer Hitparade)	19
UK Albums (Official Charts)	4
US Billboard 200	31
