= Jake Wade and the Soul Searchers =

- Genres: Soul music, funk
- Years active: 1960s to 1970s
- Labels: Mutt Records, Ubiquity Records, Mojo
- Past members: Wade Washington a.k.a. Jake Wade; Cornelious Johnson a.k.a. Juju. Miles Joseph; Chuck Middleton; Brock James

Jake Wade and the Soul Searchers was an American funk band, signed to Ubiquity Records. They toured with Stoney Murphy and Meat Loaf in the early 1970s. Their song, "Searching for Soul", was sampled in the 2006 Beyoncé song, "Suga Mama".

== Background ==
The band consisted of Jake Wade (real name Wade Washington), guitarists Miles Joseph and Chuck Middleton, and a horn section that included Cornelious Johnson a.k.a. Juju. Chris M. Slawecki of All About Jazz described "Searching for Soul" as a " slinky funk instrumental".

Wade was described in the book, To Hell And Back: An Autobiography by David Dalton, Meat Loaf as a man who was like someone out of a seventies blacksploitation movie who wore a Shaft styled hat. He also drove a modified Cadillac which had its roof removed and replaced with lucite dome instead, looking like a green plastic bubble. The car also caused some issues which included looks of disapproval at motels while in the South.

While playing in the south, there were issues with the black members of the band not being served in establishments. Jake Wade was refused service at one restaurant.

== Career ==
The group would record a single for the Mutt Records label which was located at 27316 Michigan Avenue in Inkster, Michigan. It was owned by Nate Dorr a.k.a. Nate Dore who was a bail bondsman. Their single "Searching For Soul Part 1" bw "Searching For Soul Part 2" was released on Mutt Records AR 872 in 1968.

Guitarist Miles Joseph joined the group around 1969 after being approached as he was filling in for Albert King's and Luther Allison's absent guitar players at the Ann Arbor Blues Festival. Playing the circuit in Detroit, Jake Wade and the Soul Searchers backed the major bands that came through.

In 1971, duo Stoney and Meatloaf had a hit with "What You See is What You Get" which made it to no. 36 on the r&b chart and no. 71 on Billboard's Top 100 chart. The male and female duo which consisted of singers Meat Loaf and Shaun Murphy had both been cast members of the musical Hair. They released a self-titled album. The group backed Stoney & Meatloaf to promote the release of the album.

Some time later, and with the addition of vocalist Roz Ryan, The Soul Searchers became Riot. The name was then changed to El-Riot and they released a single on the Mojo label, “Do It Right”.

== Later years ==
In addition to the Beyoncé song, "Suga Mama", "Searching For Soul" would be sampled by Ghostface Killah feat. Raekwon, Method Man and Redman for "Troublemakers" and by Lana Del Rey for "Playing Dangerous", both released in 2010. It also appeared on the Searching for Soul: Soul, Funk & Jazz Rarities from Michigan 1968-1980 various artists compilation that was released by Ubiquity Records on released October 29, 2015.

Miles Joseph who would later play and record with artists such as Bob Dylan, Aretha Franklin, Joe Sample, Edgar Winter, and Bruce Willis died on December 25, 2012, of heart failure. Cornelius Johnson was still playing in the Detroit area around 2009. Roz Ryan of the El-Riot period became a successful stage and film actress.

== Discography (selective) ==
=== Jake Wade and the Soul Searchers ===
USA Singles unless specified otherwise
Act	Song title	Release info	Year	Notes #
Jake Wade and the Soul Searchers	"Searching For Soul Part 1" / "Searching For Soul Part 2"	Mutt Records AR 872	1968	

=== El-Riot ===
USA Singles unless specified otherwise
Act	Song title	Release info	Year	Notes #
El-Riot	"Do it Right / "One by "One"	Mojo Records M-101	1978	
