= Stoney & Meatloaf (band) =

Duo of Meat Loaf and Shaun Murphy

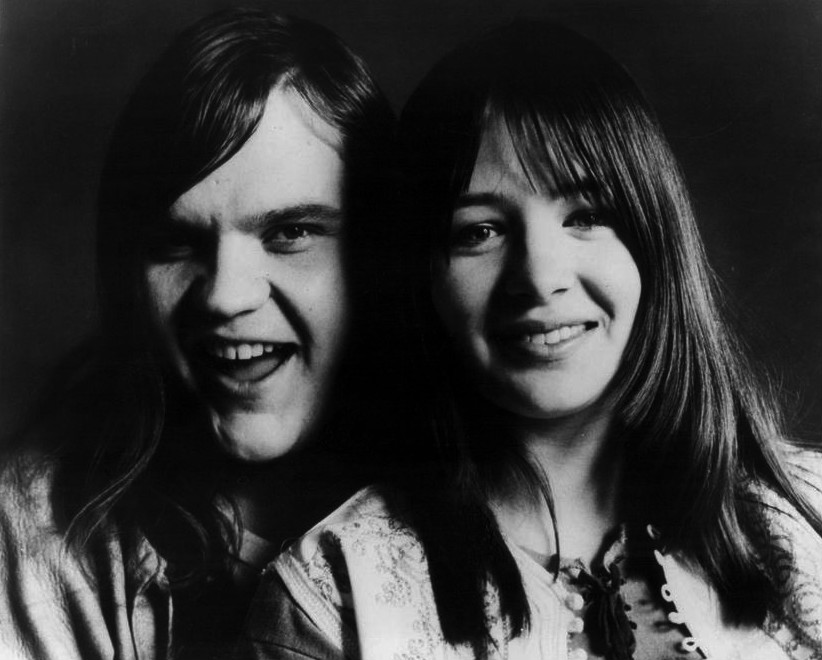
- Stoney & Meatloaf.

Background information
- Origin: Detroit, United States
- Genres: Soul rock
- Years active: 1971–1972
- Label: Motown
- Past members: Meat Loaf; Shaun Murphy

Stoney & Meatloaf was a duo of singer Meat Loaf and Stoney (Shaun Murphy). They released one album in 1971: Stoney & Meatloaf. Meat Loaf and Murphy had met previously in the Detroit music scene, and then performed with the Detroit cast of Hair. Meat Loaf, whose name was styled "Meatloaf" on the album, had a minor hit "What You See Is What You Get".

== Breakup ==
The duo disbanded when the record company cut out their vocals to "Who Is the Leader of the People?" and replaced them with Edwin Starr's vocals instead. Meat Loaf was then released from the Motown contract by management, while Murphy was retained for a short period, and left on her own to pursue other offers.

Meat Loaf went on to a successful solo career. He sang "What You See Is What You Get" live on his Live Around the World album in 1996.

Murphy, known for her longtime association with Bob Seger, joined Eric Clapton's band for the "Behind the Sun Tour" in 1985, prior to joining the L.A.– based band, Little Feat, as a lead singer in 1993.

The album was released on CD in 2017. "(I'd Love to Be) As Heavy as Jesus" was released on a Gospel CD compilation, Key to the Kingdom. (According to Meat Loaf on his VH1 Storytellers live album, he auditioned for Jim Steinman with this song.) Both singles appear on CD as part of The Complete Motown Singles series, on volumes 11A: 1971 and 11B: 1971.

The album was released on CD for the first time in remastered 2-disc form by Real Gone Music and Second Disc Records in 2022. The release introduced a selection of bonus tracks including new mixes of the additional songs originally released on the 1978 reissue of the album, as well as both sides of Stoney's solo single for Motown, and unreleased outtakes from those sessions.

== Discography ==
- Stoney & Meatloaf - 1971
- Meatloaf featuring Stoney & Meatloaf (re-release) - 1978 (many different variations)
