= Hell in a Handbasket =

- North American cover

Studio album by Meat Loaf
- Released: September 30, 2011 (Australia); February 27, 2012 (UK); March 13, 2012 (US)
- Recorded: Summer 2011
- Genre: Hard rock, heavy metal
- Length: 53:05
- Label: Legacy
- Producer: Paul Crook, Lil Jon

Meat Loaf chronology
Hang Cool Teddy Bear (2010)	Hell in a Handbasket (2011)	Braver Than We Are (2016)

Professional ratings
Aggregate scores
Source	Rating
Metacritic	44/100
Review scores
Source	Rating
AllMusic	3/5 stars
The A.V. Club	C−
Consequence of Sound	2/5 stars
The Guardian	3/5 stars
The Independent	2/5 stars
London Evening Standard	4/5 stars
PopMatters	3/10
Record Collector	2/5 stars
Spin	2/10
Uncut	5/10

Hell in a Handbasket is the eleventh studio album by Meat Loaf, released September 30, 2011, in Australia and New Zealand, through Legacy Recordings (Sony Music Entertainment). A wider global release followed in early 2012. It features guest appearances from Lil Jon, Mark McGrath, Trace Adkins, John Rich, and Chuck D, as well as Meat Loaf’s regular collaborators Paul Crook and Patti Russo.

== Background ==
The album was produced by Neverland Express guitarist Paul Crook. Songwriters who had worked on his previous album also made a return, including Gregory Becker and John Paul White ("Let's Be in Love") and Tommy Henriksen (co-author of the digital bonus track "Prize Fight Lover"). Also prominently featured on the album is songwriter Sean McConnell, whose contributions were originally developed for Hang Cool Teddy Bear but wound up being discarded as the album took a different direction creatively (however, he is still thanked in that album's liner notes). The album was released on Legacy Recordings, the catalog division of Sony Music Entertainment, which overseas Meat Loaf's back catalog of releases on the Sony-owned Epic and Arista labels.

Due to the lengthy gaps between releases in various regions, Meat Loaf intimated in response to public demand that there was still time for longtime collaborator Jim Steinman to make a contribution to the album in its internationally released form. Meat Loaf concluded by noting "don't rule it out." This was a more specific variation on a previous statement, namely that he would work with Steinman again but that Steinman "doesn't know it yet." Speculation then occurred as to what the contribution could be. In 2008, Steinman had stated on his website he was creating an album as a promotional tie-in to the then-forthcoming Bat Out of Hell musical with a working title of Bat Out of Hell: The Climax or The Final at Bat, which would feature "new versions of classic BOOH 1&2 songs, and ALL the brand newest songs, sung by many amazing artists." He hastened to add that there was "NO REASON Meat couldnt [sic] sing these too."

== Title ==
The title "Hell in a Handbasket" refers to the popular saying that things are going "to hell in a handbasket." According to Meat Loaf, he chose the title because "the world's gone to hell in a handbasket and every day that I listen to the news, I think the handbasket is getting bigger."

== Singles ==
"Stand in the Storm", featuring special guest appearances from Meat Loaf's Celebrity Apprentice teammates Mark McGrath, John Rich, and Lil Jon, was the first promotional single released digitally in May 2011, to benefit their respective charities.

The first physical and second digital single, "All of Me", the album's opening track, was released for download exclusively through iTunes Australia on August 26, 2011.

The album's seventh track, a cover of "California Dreamin'" (originally by The Mamas and The Papas) featuring Patti Russo, was released to radio in Australia in early September 2011.

== Track listing ==
=== Australian/German version ===
No.	Title	Writer(s)	Length
1.	"All of Me"	Dave Berg	5:17
2.	"Fall from Grace"	Gregory Becker, Bobby Huff, Bleu McAuley	3:46
3.	"The Giving Tree"	Evan Watson	4:54
4.	"Mad Mad World/The Good God Is a Woman and She Don't Like Ugly" (Special appearance by Chuck D)	Tom Cochrane, Paul Crook, Carlton Ridenhour	4:05
5.	"Party of One"	Dave Kushner, Franky Perez	3:59
6.	"Live or Die"	Gregory Becker, Tommy Henriksen, John Paul White	4:27
7.	"California Dreamin'" (Duet with Patti Russo)	John Phillips, Michelle Phillips	3:57
8.	"Another Day"	Wade Bowen, Sean McConnell	5:03
9.	"40 Days"	Bill Luther, Justin Weaver	5:23
10.	"Our Love and Our Souls" (Duet with Patti Russo)	Sean McConnell	4:00
11.	"Stand in the Storm" (Special guest appearances from Lil Jon, John Rich and Mark McGrath)	Barry Dean, J. Smith, Troy Verges	4:37
12.	"Blue Sky"	Sean McConnell	2:57

=== North American/European version ===
No.	Title	Writer(s)	Length
1.	"All of Me"	Dave Berg	5:17
2.	"The Giving Tree"	Evan Watson	4:54
3.	"Live or Die"	Gregory Becker, Tommy Henriksen, John Paul White	4:27
4.	"Blue Sky/Mad Mad World/The Good God Is a Woman and She Don't Like Ugly" (Special appearance by Chuck D)	Tom Cochrane, Paul Crook, Sean McConnell, Carlton Ridenhour	4:58
5.	"California Dreamin'" (Duet with Patti Russo)	John Phillips, Michelle Phillips	3:57
6.	"Party of One"	Dave Kushner, Franky Perez	3:59
7.	"Another Day"	Wade Bowen, Sean McConnell	5:03
8.	"40 Days"	Bill Luther, Justin Weaver	5:23
9.	"Our Love and Our Souls" (Duet with Patti Russo)	Sean McConnell	4:00
10.	"Stand in the Storm" (Special guest appearances from Lil Jon, Trace Adkins and Mark McGrath)	Barry Dean, J. Smith, Troy Verges	4:42
11.	"Blue Sky"	Sean McConnell	2:57
12.	"Fall from Grace"	Gregory Becker, Bobby Huff, Bleu McAuley	3:46

== Personnel ==
- Produced and engineered by Paul Crook
- Additional production ("Stand in the Storm") by Lil Jon
- Mixed by Chris Lord-Alge

=== Musicians ===
- Meat Loaf – lead vocals

==== The Neverland Express ====
- Paul Crook – guitar, keyboards, synthesizer, loop programming
- Randy Flowers – guitar, backing vocals
- Danny Miranda – bass guitar, upright bass
- Justin Avery – piano, organ, keyboards, synthesizer, backing vocals
- Dave Luther – saxophone, backing vocals
- John Miceli – drums, percussion
- Patti Russo – female lead vocals (track 10), featured vocals (track 7), backing vocals

==== Regular Meat Loaf studio sidemen ====
- Jamie Muhoberac – keyboard, synthesizer (tracks 1, 8, 10)

==== Session musicians ====
- Ginny Luke – violin (track 5)
- Caitlin Evanson – fiddle (track 6)
- Glen Duncan – mandolin (track 9)
- Bruce Bowden – pedal steel (track 11)
- Jerry Flowers – backing vocals (track 4)

==== Guest appearances ====
- Chuck D – rap ("The Good God's a Woman and She Don't Like Ugly")
- Mark McGrath – vocals ("Stand in the Storm")
- John Rich/Trace Adkins – vocals ("Stand in the Storm")
- Lil Jon – rap, drum programming ("Stand in the Storm")

== Charts ==
Chart (2011–12)	Peak position
Australian Albums (ARIA)	20
Dutch Albums (Album Top 100)	62
German Albums (Offizielle Top 100)	29
Irish Albums (IRMA)	51
New Zealand Albums (RMNZ)	39
Scottish Albums (OCC)	6
Swiss Albums (Schweizer Hitparade)	49
UK Albums (OCC)	5
US Billboard 200	100

== Tour ==
Meat Loaf embarked on the Guilty Pleasure Tour across Australia and New Zealand in October 2011 in support of the album, receiving mixed reviews for his vocal performance. The show in Sydney was recorded for DVD release.
