= Russ Terrana =

American recording engineer

- Born: July 6, 1946 (age 79); Detroit, Michigan, US
- Occupation: Recording engineer
- Label: Motown Records

Russ Terrana (born July 6, 1946) is an American recording engineer and sound mixer who worked at Motown Records for 18 years, serving as the label's chief engineer.

== Early life and education ==
Terrana was born in Detroit, Michigan, and developed an interest in music at a young age, forming a band with his twin brother, Ralph, and a friend when he was ten years old. Terrana later received a degree in electronic engineering, which provided him with a technical foundation for his career in music production.

== Career ==
At age 23, Motown hired Terrana on the spot after his interview in 1966, and he began to develop his audio engineering skills. He quickly gained the trust of Berry Gordy, the founder of Motown, and rose to become the label's chief recording engineer. During his 18 years at Motown, Terrana recorded numerous artists, including Diana Ross, The Supremes, The Jackson 5, and Stevie Wonder.

In 1983, he was nominated for an Emmy Award for Outstanding Film Sound Mixing for a Limited Series or a Special for his work on The Eddie Rabbitt Special. In 1985, he won the Emmy for Outstanding Live and Tape Sound Mixing and Sound Effects for a Limited Series or Special for his work on Motown Returns to the Apollo.
