= Paul Crook =

American guitarist

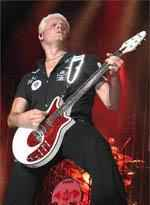
- Crook in 2007 with his Brian May signature guitar

Background information
- Born: Paul Matthew Crook; February 12, 1966 (age 60); Plainfield, New Jersey, U.S.
- Genres: Hard rock, heavy metal, progressive rock
- Occupation: Guitarist
- Years active: 1993–present

Paul Crook (born February 12, 1966) is an American guitarist known for recording and performing with Meat Loaf. He has also recorded and toured with Anthrax, Sebastian Bach and Marya Roxx.

== Biography ==
Growing up in Green Brook Township, New Jersey, Crook started playing guitar at the age of 10 when his parents (Dennis & Carol) bought him a basic acoustic as a Christmas gift. Crook took to the guitar quickly and found himself practicing hours-on-end. His father, after seeing this for a few years, then bought him his first "real" guitar: a black Gibson Les Paul Custom.

== Professional career ==
Years later Crook teamed up with Jack Secret (aka Tony Geranios), the keyboard tech for Rush. They wrote and recorded several songs together. Some of which were Produced by Alex Lifeson at Electric Lady Studios, in New York City. Secret introduced Crook to the members of Blue Öyster Cult (BOC), who took Crook out on the road in 1986 as a keyboard/guitar tech.

While in Germany with BOC, Crook met Bernie Marsden of Whitesnake fame. The two began to work together, writing and recording in the United Kingdom.

In 1989 Crook met Anthrax through Rick Downey. Crook became guitar tech for Dan Spitz, and, in 1995, replaced Spitz (although not an official member). Crook toured with Anthrax for the rest of the decade and performed on two records, Stomp 442 and Volume 8: The Threat Is Real, which he also co-produced and engineered.

In 1999, Sebastian Bach of Skid Row fame asked Crook to join his band. They did shows together, touring around the world until 2004. Their only recording was "Rock Bottom", on a Kiss tribute record.

In 1999 Crook teamed up with Glenn Hughes. Together, they composed the ballad "Feels Like Home" for Glenn's solo record Building The Machine.

In 2000 Crook teamed up with Scott Metaxas from Prophet and Nuclear Assault fame. The two of them Co-produced Billy Milano's M.O.D. record The Rebel You Love to Hate.

In 2003 Kasim Sulton asked Crook to join Meat Loaf's Neverland Express. Crook appeared in the music video "Couldn't Have Said It Better Myself" and then hit the road for a long world tour including television appearances.

A live DVD was filmed at the end of the tour (in Australia): Bat out of Hell: Live with the Melbourne Symphony Orchestra.

In 2004 Crook auditioned for the musical We Will Rock You, featuring the music of Queen. He had to audition for Brian May, one of his main influences. May trained Crook personally for the position. Crook relocated to Las Vegas to perform his favorite Queen songs. After a 16-month run the show moved to Toronto, Canada. To this day Crook remains in Las Vegas and still calls it his home.

In 2006 Crook hit the studio with Meat Loaf and the Neverland Express to record Bat Out of Hell III: The Monster Is Loose. The album was produced by Desmond Child.

While touring Bat Out of Hell III: The Monster Is Loose a camera crew was called in to record every move the band made. This footage later became known as the documentary film: Meat Loaf In Search Of Paradise.

In 2007 (while on a tour break) Crook received a text message from famed producer Kevin Shirley, who asked Crook to play on a heavy metal record for Marya Roxx. Shirley assembled a solid band: Crook (guitars), Scott Metaxas (bass), Derek Sherinian (keyboards) and Brian Tichy (drums). They re-wrote and recorded 12 songs in 10 days at The Document Room in Malibu, California.

2008 brought Crook out on the road for Meat Loaf's Casa De Carne tour.

2009 was a very busy year. After a tour of Europe with Marya Roxx, Crook jumped back in the studio with Meat Loaf. This time Rob Cavallo was called in to produce. They began recording on June 1 in Calabasas, California. Many stellar musicians were brought in to create the massive sound. Sharing guitar duties alongside Crook were Brian May, Steve Vai, Justin Hawkins, Randy Flowers and Tim Pierce.

While recording Meat Loaf's Hang Cool, Teddy Bear album Crook was asked by Rob Cavallo to record on a song with Adam Lambert from American Idol fame. The song was "Time for Miracles". It was released and went to #9 on iTunes. "Time for Miracles" was a part of the motion picture soundtrack for 2012.

In 2010 Meat Loaf asked Crook to produce the album Hell In A Handbasket. The album was released on September 30, 2011.

Crook spent most of 2011/2012 on the road with Meat Loaf.

Meat Loaf asked Crook to mix the Guilty Pleasure Tour, Live From Sydney.

In early 2013 Meat Loaf and Crook began song editing and video creation for the Last At Bat Tour. All of the video media used in the show was put together by the two of them. The tour mounted in April 2013 and took them through the UK, Ireland, Germany and the Netherlands.

After the Last At Bat Tour, Crook began working with Meat Loaf on song arrangements and video production for a Las Vegas residency... Rocktellz And Cocktails had a successful 26-week run at Planet Hollywood Resort & Casino.

Summer 2014, Crook began production work on Meat Loaf's upcoming album Braver Than We Are.

While on break from recording Braver Than We Are, Crook began production for Frank DiMino's album Old Habits Die Hard. It was released on Frontiers Records in July 2015.

July 2015 Crook found himself back in the studio with Meat Loaf, recording vocals on Braver Than We Are. A majority of the work was done during an 11-week period in a rental house just outside of Nashville. Vocal overdubs and mixing were completed in Las Vegas (December 2015 - February 2016). Release date is slated for September 2016.

== Work ==
- Meat Loaf: "Braver Than We Are" Produced, Engineered, Performed and Mixed. released Sept 2016.
- Frank DiMino: "Old Habits Die Hard" Produced, Engineered, Performed and Mixed 2015.
- Meat Loaf: "In And Out Of Hell", Full Feature Documentary Film.
- Meat Loaf: "Guilty Pleasures, Live in Sydney, Australia" Mixed and performed, released in 2012
- Meat Loaf: "Hell In A Handbasket" Produced and Engineered by Paul Crook, released 10/2011
- Meat Loaf: "Hang Cool Teddy Bear" Produced by Rob Cavallo released 4/2010
- Adam Lambert: "Time For Miracles" Soundtrack for the Major Motion Picture: "2012"
- Meat Loaf: "In Search Of Paradise", Full Feature Documentary Film.
- Meat Loaf: "Bat Out Of Hell III, The Monster's Loose" Produced by Desmond Child
- Marya Roxx: "21?!" Produced by Kevin Shirley
- Meat Loaf: 3 Bats Live DVD and CD
- Meat Loaf: Bat out of Hell: Live with the Melbourne Symphony Orchestra DVD and CD.
- Meat Loaf: Bat Out of Hell III: The Monster Is Loose CD
- Meat Loaf: "Couldn't Have Said It Better" music video.
- Anthrax: Stomp 442 CD
- Anthrax: Volume 8: The Threat Is Real CD
- Anthrax: "Twisted Forever" CD
- Anthrax: "The Four Horsemen" CD
- Sebastian Bach: "The Last Hard Men"
- Glenn Hughes: "Building The Machine"
- M.O.D.: The Rebel You Love to Hate CD
- John Carpenter's: Ghosts of Mars Major Motion Picture soundtrack

== Bands ==
- Lead Guitarist for Meat Loaf
- Lead Guitarist for the Queen musical We Will Rock You in Las Vegas 2004-05
- Lead Guitarist for Anthrax 1995-2001
- Lead Guitarist for Sebastian Bach

== Sources ==
- https://web.archive.org/web/20071208232240/http://soundperformancelab.com/Ref/paul_crook.html
- http://www.uberrock.co.uk/interviews/52-January-interviews/457-paul-crook-interview-exclusive.html
