= Hang Cool Teddy Bear =

Studio album by Meat Loaf
- Released: 19 April 2010
- Recorded: August–December 2009
- Genre: Rock, hard rock
- Length: 64:56
- Label: Mercury, Loud & Proud (US)
- Producer: Rob Cavallo

Meat Loaf chronology
Bat Out of Hell III: The Monster Is Loose (2006)	Hang Cool Teddy Bear (2010)	Hell in a Handbasket (2011)

Singles from Hang Cool Teddy Bear
- 1. "Los Angeloser" Released: April 2, 2010

Hang Cool Teddy Bear is the tenth studio album by Meat Loaf. It was released on 19 April 2010 by Mercury Records in the UK and by Loud & Proud Records in the US on 11 May 2010, with global distribution handled by Universal Music Group.

The album was produced by Rob Cavallo and contains songs written by Justin Hawkins, Rick Brantley and Jon Bon Jovi, amongst others. Guests on the album include Brian May, Steve Vai, Paul Crook, Patti Russo, Hugh Laurie, Jack Black, Aly and AJ, and Pearl Aday. This is the fourth studio album by Meat Loaf not to include any songs written by former collaborator Jim Steinman.

The first single from the album, "Los Angeloser", was released for download on April 5, 2010.

The album was released on CD, Hardback book CD/DVD Deluxe edition, Limited Edition LP, digital and Super Deluxe Box Set. The Super Deluxe edition comes in a booklike box containing two audio CDs, a concert DVD of Meat Loaf live in 2008, a Meat Loaf metal keyring, sheet music for the track "Los Angeloser," and a Meat Loaf Hang Cool Teddy Bear album art print card. The Universal Music UK store has an exclusive version available featuring a signed certificate.

== Production ==
In May 2009, Meat Loaf began work on the album in the studio with Green Day's American Idiot album producer Rob Cavallo, whom he credits with rescuing the project after the initial recordings were made. "I went into the studio with 19 songs and three of them made the record," Meat Loaf said. "Rob said, 'Look, these other songs are for a different album than the one we're making.'" A friend, Hollywood screenwriter Kilian Kerwin, gave Meat Loaf the idea of making a concept album. Meat Loaf and Kerwin discussed the idea of a soldier lying near death on a battlefield, but instead of his life flashing before his eyes, his possible future flashes before them. Each song presents "a different scenario in his future". Meat Loaf recruited eight songwriters for the album— including Jon Foreman, Desmond Child, former American Idol judge Kara DioGuardi, The Darkness frontman Justin Hawkins, Rick Brantley, Eric Sean Nally, Tommy Henriksen and Jon Bon Jovi. "I didn't tell [the songwriters] what the story was and I'm kind of glad I didn't because it becomes too literal when you do that," Meat Loaf said.

Much of the work on the album was done in July 2009. It was officially completed as of December 12, 2009.

Guest musicians on the album include guitarists Steve Vai and Brian May of Queen, a longtime friend of Meat Loaf, Brooklyn musician Adam Ahuja, as well as actors Hugh Laurie and Jack Black, also old friends.

== Track listing ==
Thirteen songs appear on the album, with a fourteenth, "Prize Fight Lover," included as a free MP3 download from hangcoolteddybear.com.

A fifteenth song was recorded as a B-side to "Los Angeloser" entitled "Boneyard." It features Meat Loaf's daughter, Pearl Aday. A further B-side is available for purchase on iTunes (US store only) entitled "Don't Get Me Going" on the "If I Can't Have You" EP. That EP also includes a single edit of "If I Can't Have You" and a live version of "Hot Patootie (Bless My Soul)" recorded on the 2010 tour.

=== Disc 1 ===
No.	Title	Writer(s)	Length
1.	"Peace on Earth"	Rick Brantley	6:38
2.	"Living on the Outside"	Brantley	5:03
3.	"Los Angeloser"	James Michael	4:09
4.	"If I Can't Have You" (feat. Kara DioGuardi and Hugh Laurie)	Kara DioGuardi, Paul Freeman, Raine Maida	5:00
5.	"Love Is Not Real/Next Time You Stab Me in the Back" (feat. Brian May and Steve Vai)	Rob Cavallo, Justin Hawkins, Meat Loaf, Eric Sean Nally	7:33
6.	"Like a Rose" (feat. Jack Black)	Kevin Kadish, Jake Scherer	3:16
7.	"Song of Madness" (feat. Steve Vai)	Brantley, Meat Loaf, Jamie Muhoberac	5:31
8.	"Did You Ever Love Somebody"	Marsha Malamet, Liz Vidal	4:01
9.	"California Isn't Big Enough (Hey There Girl)" (*Not included on some editions)	Hawkins, Nally	4:43
10.	"Running Away from Me"	Jon Foreman	3:54
11.	"Let's Be in Love" (feat. Patti Russo)	Gregory Becker, John Paul White, Mathius Wollo	5:11
12.	"If It Rains"	Jaren Johnston, Neil Mason	3:56
13.	"Elvis in Vegas"	Desmond Child, Billy Falcon, Jon Bon Jovi	6:01

Bonus tracks
No.	Title	Writer(s)	Length
14.	"Boneyard" (iTunes bonus track)	Tom Hambridge	5:02
15.	"Prize Fight Lover" (free download bonus track www.hangcoolteddybear.com)	Dave Bassett, Rick Brantley, Tommy Henriksen	5:50
16.	"Don't Get Me Going" (iTunes and Napster B-side to If I Can't Have You EP)		2:53

Disc 2: Casa de Carne Live Album (with Deluxe and Super Deluxe Editions only)
No.	Title	Writer(s)	Length
1.	"I Want You So Hard (Boy's Bad News)" (8/11/08, Helsinki Ice Hall, Finland)	Jesse Hughes, Josh Homme	3:09
2.	"If It Ain't Broke, Break It" (7/9/08 Nottingham Arena, UK)	Jim Steinman	4:59
3.	"Blind as a Bat" (7/13/08, Blickling Hall, Norfolk, UK)	Desmond Child, James Michael	6:21
4.	"Amnesty Is Granted" (7/21/08, Zitadelle Spandau, Berlin, Germany)	Sammy Hagar	5:11
5.	"Rock and Roll Dreams Come Through" (7/23/08, Stadtpark, Hamburg)	Steinman	7:34
6.	"I'd Do Anything for Love (But I Won't Do That)" (6/29/08, The Marquee, Cork, Ireland)	Steinman	10:01
7.	"Two Out of Three Ain't Bad" (12/2/08, Chevrolet Centre, Youngstown, Ohio)	Steinman	6:25
8.	"Bat Out of Hell" (12/6/08, United Palace Theatre, New York)	Steinman	12:51
9.	"Roadhouse Blues/Why Don't We Do It in the Road?" (8/8/08, Grieghallen, Bergen, Norway)	The Doors/John Lennon, Paul McCartney	9:29
10.	"Out of the Frying Pan (And Into the Fire)" (7/26/08, Atlântico Hall, Lisbon (iTunes exclusive))	Steinman	10:39

=== Disc 2: Tour Edition ===
During Meat Loaf's 2010 UK tour, a special two-disc tour edition was given out. The second disc included four songs recorded live at the PNC Bank Arts Center in Holmdel, New Jersey, on July 16, 2010.

No.	Title	Writer(s)	Length
1.	"Peace on Earth"	Rick Brantley	7:03
2.	"Living on the Outside"	Brantley	5:58
3.	"Song of Madness"	Brantley, Meat Loaf, Jamie Muhoberac	6:25
4.	"Los Angeloser"	James Michael	4:59

== Reception ==
Professional ratings
Review scores
Source	Rating
The Guardian	3/5 stars
The Independent	2/5 stars
AllMusic	2.5/5 stars
411mania	9/10 stars
The Times	4/5 stars
Mojo Radio	8.4/10

Writing for The Guardian, Caroline Sullivan said: "Hang Cool, Teddy Bear is of a piece with the rest of his catalogue: the pounding guitars never slacken, emotions are writ very large and the lyrics rarely lack sly wit...less happily, the tempo never varies – this album desperately needs a ballad – and 13 unrelenting tracks is a good deal more than enough." The Times gave a positive review, saying: 'Everything about Meat's eleventh album screams novelty cabaret “metal”, yet this is his most credible record in three decades. Ditching the theatrical cheese, Meat, 62, can still bellow an anthem of youthful lust.' The Independent was more skeptical, pointing to correlation between recruiting guest-performers and the weakness of 'a high-profile performer's output'.

=== Chart performance ===
The album charted at number 4 in the official UK Albums Chart on April 25, 2010. It peaked at number 27 on the US Billboard 200.

== The Hang Cool Tour ==
The Hang Cool Tour commenced on July 3, 2010, in support of the album and consisted of three legs through Europe and North America until August 5, 2011.

== Personnel ==
- Produced by Rob Cavallo
- Mixed by Chris Lord-Alge
- Engineered by Doug McKean
- Mastered by Ted Jensen
- String and percussion arrangements on "Peace on Earth": David Campbell

The album art is by Boris Vallejo.

=== Musicians ===
- Meat Loaf – lead vocals

==== The Neverland Express ====
- Paul Crook – guitar
- Randy Flowers – guitar, backing vocals (tracks 1–4, 7, 8, 10–13)
- Kasim Sulton – bass guitar, backing vocals
- John Miceli – drums
- Patti Russo – female lead vocals (track 11), featured vocals (track 2), backing vocals (tracks 1–3, 7, 8, 10, 12, 13)
- Carolyn "C.C." Coletti-Jablonski – backing vocals (tracks 2, 7, 8, 10, 12, 13)

==== Regular Meat Loaf studio sidemen ====
- James Michael – guitar, backing vocals (track 3)
- Tim Pierce – guitar
- Pearl Aday – backing vocals ("Boneyard")

==== Session musicians ====
- Adam Ahuja – "3rd verse R&B guitar" (track 5)
- Rob Cavallo – additional guitar (track 5)
- Chris Chaney – bass guitar
- Jamie Muhoberac – keyboards
- Eric Dover, Jaime Neely, Julian Raymond, Eric Skodus – backing vocals (track 9)
- Carmen Carter – backing vocals (tracks 2, 11)
- Marcus Blake, Georgia Haege (also track 2), Jim Wilson – backing vocals (tracks 7, 8, 10, 12, 13)

==== Guest appearances ====
- Rick Brantley – guitar, backing vocals (tracks 1, 2, 7)
- Justin Hawkins – guitar, backing vocals (tracks 3, 5, 9)
- Steve Vai – additional guitar (tracks 5, 7)
- Brian May – additional guitar (track 5)
- Hugh Laurie – piano (track 4)
- Kara DioGuardi – female lead and backing vocals (track 4)
- 78violet – backing vocals (track 4)
- Jack Black – backing vocals (track 6)
- Jake Scherer – backing vocals (track 6)

== Charts ==
Chart (2010)	Peak position
Australian Albums (ARIA)	16
Austrian Albums (Ö3 Austria)	11
Belgian Albums (Ultratop Flanders)	49
Canadian Albums (Billboard)	18
Danish Albums (Hitlisten)	16
Dutch Albums (Album Top 100)	23
German Albums (Offizielle Top 100)	4
Greek Albums (IFPI)	30
Irish Albums (IRMA)	28
New Zealand Albums (RMNZ)	5
Norwegian Albums (VG-lista)	16
Scottish Albums (OCC)	3
Swedish Albums (Sverigetopplistan)	21
Swiss Albums (Schweizer Hitparade)	4
UK Albums (OCC)	4
US Billboard 200	27

== Certifications ==
Region	Certification	Certified units/sales
United Kingdom (BPI)	Gold	100,000^{‡}
^{‡} Sales+streaming figures based on certification alone.
