= Heads Will Roll =

Heads Will Roll may refer to:

- Heads Will Roll (EP), 2006 extended play by Marion Raven
- "Heads Will Roll" (song), 2009 song by Yeah Yeah Yeahs
- "Heads Will Roll", song by Echo & the Bunnymen from Porcupine (album)
- "Heads Will Roll", song by Ted Nugent from Intensities in 10 Cities
- "Heads Will Roll", song by Marion Raven from Set Me Free (Marion Raven album)
- "Heads Will Roll" (Ballers), a 2015 television episode
- "Heads Will Roll" (Under the Dome), a 2014 television episode
- Heads Will Roll (podcast), 2019 audio production by Audible
