= Cry Over Me =

Single by Meat Loaf

from the album Bat Out of Hell III: The Monster Is Loose
- Released: May 7, 2007
- Genre: Rock
- Length: 4:40
- Label: Mercury
- Songwriter(s): Diane Warren
- Producer(s): Desmond Child

Meat Loaf singles chronology
"It's All Coming Back to Me Now" (2006)	"Cry Over Me" (2007)	"Los Angeloser" (2010)

"Cry Over Me" is the second single from Meat Loaf's 2006 album Bat Out of Hell III: The Monster Is Loose. It was written by Diane Warren and released on 7 May 2007 in the UK.

== History ==
"Blind as a Bat" was scheduled to be released in the UK on 18 December 2006, but was then put back to February 26, as two CDs. In turn, that single was pulled at the last minute, in favour of "Cry Over Me". It charted at number 47 on the UK Singles Chart.

== Video ==
P. R. Brown directed the video for "Cry over Me." The video for "Cry over Me" had the lowest budget since those for the original album. A simple video, Meat Loaf has said that it only took four hours to film. The video was also included as bonus feature on the 3 Bats Live DVD, released in October 2007.

== Song content ==
"Cry Over Me" is, according to Meat Loaf, a timeless song dealing with relationships of all kinds. In a 2007 interview, he says that it can be about your first or last loves, or dealing with your boss at work. Partially quoting the lyrics, the singer posits that there are times when "you want him to feel exactly like I felt when he said that to me."

== Charts ==
Chart (2007)	Position
UK Singles Chart	47

== Track listing ==
1. "Cry Over Me" (3:58)
2. "Dead Ringer" (5:14)
