= The Casa de Carne Tour =

2008 concert tour by Meat Loaf

Casa de Carne
- Tour by Meat Loaf
- Associated album: Bat Out of Hell III: The Monster Is Loose
- Start date: 27 June 2008
- End date: 6 December 2008
- Legs: 2
- No. of shows: 29

Meat Loaf concert chronology
- The Seize the Night Tour (2006–2007); The Casa de Carne Tour (2008); The Hang Cool Tour (2010–2011)

Casa de Carne (Spanish: House of Meat) is the name of Meat Loaf's 2008 European Summer Tour. After his 2007 tour was cut short due to a cyst on his vocal cord, Meat Loaf returned to the stage. To the delight of fans, Meat Loaf made his return alongside his longtime duet partner Patti Russo, who debuted one of her own original songs during Loaf's show. The tour kicked off in Plymouth, England on 27 June 2008 and continued through July and August with 20 showdates throughout Europe. Six United States showdates were also added for October and December 2008.

== Tour dates ==
| Date | City | Country | Venue |
Europe
| June 27, 2008 | Plymouth | England | Home Park, Plymouth Argyle F.C. |
| June 29, 2008 | Cork | Ireland | The Marquee |
| July 2, 2008 | Liverpool | England | The Liverpool Summer Pops |
| July 4, 2008 | Bath | England | Bath Recreational Ground |
| July 6, 2008 | Hampshire | England | Broadlands, Romsey |
| July 9, 2008 | Nottingham | England | Nottingham Arena |
| July 11, 2008 | North Yorkshire | England | Castle Howard |
| July 13, 2008 | Norfolk | England | Blickling Hall |
| July 15, 2008 | Donegal | Ireland | Marquee, Great Northern Hotel |
| July 19, 2008 | Gelsenkirchen | Germany | Gelsenkirchen Amphitheater |
| July 21, 2008 | Berlin | Germany | Zitadelle Spandau |
| July 23, 2008 | Hamburg | Germany | Stadtpark |
| July 26, 2008 | Lisbon | Portugal | Atlântico Hall |
| August 2, 2008 | London | England | The Excel, Docklands |
| August 4, 2008 | Amsterdam | Netherlands | Heineken Music Hall |
| August 8, 2008 | Bergen | Norway | Grieghallen |
| August 11, 2008 | Helsinki | Finland | Helsinki Ice Hall |
| August 13, 2008 | Linköping | Sweden | Cloetta Center |
| August 15, 2008 | Kolding | Denmark | Kolding Stadium |
| August 16, 2008 | Hillerød | Denmark | Hilleroed Stadium |
North America
| October 17, 2008 | Clearwater | United States | Ruth Eckerd Hall |
| October 18, 2008 | Pompano Beach | United States | Pompano Beach Amphitheatre |
| October 31, 2008 | Temecula | United States | Pechanga Resort and Casino |
| December 2, 2008 | Youngstown | United States | Chevrolet Center |
| December 5, 2008 | Asbury Park | United States | Asbury Park Convention Hall |
| December 6, 2008 | New York City | United States | United Palace Theater |

== Setlists ==
=== UK leg ===
- "I Want You So Hard (Boy's Bad News)" (Eagles of Death Metal cover)
- "If It Ain't Broke (Break It)"
- "Out of the Frying Pan (And into the Fire)"
- "Life Is a Lemon and I Want My Money Back"
- "Bad for Good"
- "Dead Ringer for Love"
- "45 Seconds of Ecstasy"
- "Amnesty Is Granted"
- "Bring Me a Bible and a Beer" (Patti Russo song)
- "Blind as a Bat"
- "Dissentience" (instrumental)
- "Paradise by the Dashboard Light"
- "Rock And Roll Dreams Come Through"
- "You Took the Words Right Out of My Mouth (Hot Summer Night)"
- "I'd Do Anything for Love (But I Won't Do That)"
- "Bat Out of Hell"
- "Roadhouse Blues" (The Doors cover)
- "Why Don't We Do It in the Road?" (The Beatles cover)
- "Mercury Blues" (Only on a few occasions was this performed)

=== US leg ===
- "I Want You So Hard (Boy's Bad News)" (Eagles of Death Metal cover)
- "If It Ain't Broke (Break It)"
- "Out of the Frying Pan (And into the Fire)"
- "Life Is a Lemon and I Want My Money Back"
- "Dead Ringer for Love"
- "Dissentience" (instrumental)
- "Paradise by the Dashboard Light"
- "I'd Do Anything for Love (But I Won't Do That)"
- "Two Out of Three Ain't Bad"
- "Bat Out of Hell"
- "Rock and Roll Dreams Come Through"
- "Roadhouse Blues" (The Doors cover)
- "Why Don't We Do It in the Road?" (The Beatles cover)
- "You Took the Words Right Out of My Mouth (Hot Summer Night)"

== Performers ==
- Meat Loaf: Lead Vocals
- Patti Russo: Lead Female Vocals
- Paul Crook: Guitar
- Randy Flowers: Guitar, Backing vocals
- Kasim Sulton: Bass, Backing vocals, Music Director
- Mark Alexander: Piano, Backing vocals
- Dave Luther: Saxophone, Keyboards, Backing vocals
- John Miceli: Drums
- C.C. Coletti: Backing vocals
