= 3 Bats Live =

Video by Meat Loaf
- Released: October 15, 2007
- Recorded: March 18, 2007
- Venue: Budweiser Gardens, London, Ontario, Canada
- Genre: Hard rock, progressive rock
- Length: 2:25:00
- Label: Hip-O

Meat Loaf chronology
Bat Out of Hell III: The Monster Is Loose (2006)	3 Bats Live (2007)	Guilty Pleasure Tour Live in Sydney (2012)

3 Bats Live is a music DVD by rock singer Meat Loaf. Recorded on March 18, 2007 at London, Ontario during his "Seize the Night" tour, it mainly features songs from the Bat Out of Hell trilogy. The DVD was released in the UK on October 15, 2007, and in the UK on November 20, 2007.

== Track listing ==
All songs by Jim Steinman, unless otherwise noted.

1. "All Revved Up with No Place to Go" (very short version)
2. "Paradise by the Dashboard Light"
3. "You Took the Words Right Out of My Mouth"
4. "Out of the Frying Pan (And Into the Fire)"
5. "Life Is a Lemon and I Want My Money Back"
6. "I'd Do Anything for Love (But I Won't Do That)"
7. "Objects in the Rear View Mirror May Appear Closer than They Are"
8. "Rock and Roll Dreams Come Through"
9. "Seize the Night" (very short version)
10. "The Monster Is Loose" (John 5/Desmond Child/Nikki Sixx)
11. "Bad for Good"
12. "If It Ain't Broke, Break It"
13. "Blind as a Bat" (Child/James Michael)
14. "Two Out of Three Ain't Bad"
15. "Bat Out of Hell"
16. "Black Betty" (Traditional)
17. "It's All Coming Back to Me Now"
18. "Mercury Blues"
19. "Gimme Shelter" (Jagger/Richards)

== Extra features ==
Extra features include the videos for "It's All Coming Back to Me Now" and "Cry Over Me", both directed by P. R. Brown. It also contains the "Monster Is Loose Animated Short Film" and "Making the Monster: Making of Bat Out of Hell III", that were included on the CD+DVD UK edition of the Bat III album. A second disc contains a ninety-minute retrospective documentary called Meat Loaf: In Search of Paradise, about preparations for the tour and its first leg.

== Other editions ==
A Limited Collectors "deluxe edition" box was also released, which includes a replica tour programme, tour poster, bat shaped sticker and guitar pick.

A Blu-ray edition was released in the United Kingdom on November 11, 2008 by Mercury UK and is also available as an import in the United States. No official US Blu-ray release has been set at this time by Hip-O or Mercury.

== Personnel ==
- Meat Loaf – lead vocals
- Kasim Sulton – bass, Vocals
- John Miceli – drums
- Mark Alexander – keyboards, vocals
- Paul Crook – guitars
- Randy Flowers – guitars, vocals
- Dave Luther – Saxophone, keyboards, vocals
- Marion Raven – guest vocals
- Aspen Miller – vocals
- "C.C." Coletti-Jablonski – vocals

== Certifications ==
Region	Certification	Certified units/sales
United Kingdom (BPI)	Gold	25,000^{*}
^{*} Sales figures based on certification alone.
