= The Seize the Night Tour =

2006–07 concert tour by Meat Loaf

Seize the Night
- Tour by Meat Loaf
- Associated album: Bat Out of Hell III: The Monster Is Loose
- Start date: February 23, 2007
- End date: November 2007
- Legs: 2
- No. of shows: 112

Meat Loaf concert chronology
- Hair of the Dog Tour (2005); The Seize the Night Tour (2006–2007); The Casa de Carne Tour (2008)

Seize the Night, also known as the Three Bats tour, is a 2007 world tour by Meat Loaf to promote the album Bat Out of Hell III: The Monster Is Loose.

Some concerts in April were cancelled due to Meat Loaf's ill health. Just over an hour into a concert in Newcastle upon Tyne on October 31, 2007, he told the audience that it was the last of his life, and walked off stage. He was later diagnosed with an "inter-vocal cord cyst" and cancelled the remaining dates on his European tour. Playing down the comments he made at Newcastle, in a statement he said "I'll be back."

A DVD of the tour was released in October 2007, entitled 3 Bats Live. It also contains a bonus disc featuring the promotional videos and animations from Bat III. The DVD also features Meat Loaf: In Search of Paradise, a documentary about the tour.

== Musicians ==
Many musicians from recent tours returned to play in the Neverland Express band. The most major change was the departure of Patti Russo, who had toured with Meat Loaf for 13 years. Vocalist Aspen Miller and saxophonist/keyboardist Dave Luther joined the band. He opened the show as lead on "All Revved up with No Place to Go".

Paul Crook, Randy Flowers, Mark Alexander, and John Miceli performed on lead guitar, guitar, piano and drums, respectively. Kasim Sulton was bass guitar and musical director.

Marion Raven joined Meat Loaf for the first leg as the supporting act. Meat Loaf introduced her on stage at the latter stages of the concerts to duet on "It's All Coming Back to Me Now". Supporting acts for the second leg included backing singer C.C. Colletti and Mother Pearl.

== Dates ==
Date	City	Country	Venue	Notes
Leg I
February 23, 2007	Pala	United States	Pala Casino	
February 28, 2007	Victoria	Canada	Save-On-Foods Memorial Centre	
March 2, 2007	Vancouver	Canada	Pacific Coliseum	
March 4, 2007	Edmonton	Canada	Rexall Place	
March 6, 2007	Kelowna	Canada	Prospera Place	
March 8, 2007	Calgary	Canada	Pengrowth Saddledome	
March 11, 2007	Winnipeg	Canada	MTS Centre	
March 14, 2007	Toronto	Canada	Hummingbird Centre	
March 16, 2007	Ottawa	Canada	Scotiabank Place	
March 18, 2007	London	Canada	John Labatt Centre	
March 20, 2007	Hamilton	Canada	Copps Coliseum	
March 22, 2007	Syracuse	United States	War Memorial at Oncenter	
March 24, 2007	Upper Darby Township	United States	Tower Theater	
March 26, 2007	Poughkeepsie	United States	Mid-Hudson Civic Center	
March 28, 2007	Binghamton	United States	Broome County Veterans Memorial Arena	
March 30, 2007	Hershey	United States	Giant Center	
April 1, 2007	Washington, D.C.	United States	DAR Constitution Hall	Postponed to April 16
April 3, 2007	Clearwater	United States	Ruth Eckerd Hall	Rescheduled for September 1
April 5, 2007	Boca Raton	United States	Mizner Amphitheater	Stopped after four songs; rescheduled for August 30
April 7, 2007	Orlando	United States	Hard Rock Live	Canceled
April 10, 2007	Wallingford	United States	Chevrolet Theatre	Canceled
April 12, 2007	New York City	United States	Theater @ Madison Square Garden	Rescheduled for July 18
April 13, 2007	New York City	United States	Theater @ Madison Square Garden	Rescheduled for July 20
April 16, 2007	Washington, D.C.	United States	DAR Constitution Hall	
Europe
May 10, 2007	Manchester	England	Manchester Evening News Arena	
May 12, 2007	Manchester	England	Manchester Evening News Arena	
May 14, 2007	Birmingham	England	NEC Arena	
May 16, 2007	Birmingham	England	NEC Arena	
May 18, 2007	Glasgow	Scotland	SECC	
May 20, 2007	Newcastle upon Tyne	England	Metro Radio Arena	
May 23, 2007	London	England	Wembley Arena	
May 25, 2007	London	England	Wembley Arena	
May 27, 2007	Sheffield	England	Hallam FM Arena	
May 29, 2007	Sheffield	England	Hallam FM Arena	
May 31, 2007	Belfast	Northern Ireland	Odyssey Arena	
June 2, 2007	Dublin	Ireland	The Point	
June 4, 2007	Dublin	Ireland	The Point	
June 7, 2007	Sölvesborg	Sweden	Sweden Rock Festival	
June 9, 2007	Middelfart	Denmark	Rock Under Broen	
June 12, 2007	Hamburg	Germany	Color Line Arena	
June 14, 2007	Cologne	Germany	Cologne Arena	
June 17, 2007	Munich	Germany	Olympiahalle	
June 19, 2007	Stuttgart	Germany	Schleyerhalle	
June 21, 2007	Frankfurt	Germany	Festhalle Frankfurt	
June 23, 2007	Frankfurt	Germany	Yello Strom World Bowl XV, Commerzbank-Arena	
June 25, 2007	Basel	Switzerland	St. Jakob Arena	
June 27, 2007	Amsterdam	Netherlands	Heineken Music Hall	
June 29, 2007	Bristol	England	Ashton Gate Football Ground	
North America
July 18, 2007	New York City	United States	Theater @ Madison Square Garden	
July 20, 2007	New York City	United States	Theater @ Madison Square Garden	
July 22, 2007	Saratoga Springs	United States	Saratoga Performing Arts Center	
July 24, 2007	Corfu	United States	Darien Lake Performing Arts Center	
July 27, 2007	Uncasville	United States	Mohegan Sun Arena	
July 29, 2007	Holmdel Township	United States	PNC Bank Arts Center	
July 31, 2007	Watertown	United States	Watertown Fairgrounds	
August 2, 2007	Scranton	United States	Toyota Pavilion at Montage Mountain	
August 4, 2007	Clearfiled	United States	Clearfield County Fair	
August 6, 2007	Bethlehem	United States	Musikfest	
August 9, 2007	Cleveland	United States	Time Warner Cable Amphitheater at Tower City	
August 11, 2007	Gilford	United States	Meadowbrook Musical Arts Center	
August 13, 2007	Montreal	Canada	Bell Centre	
August 16, 2007	Rama	Canada	Casino Rama	
August 18, 2007	Atlantic City	United States	Borgata Events Center	
August 20, 2007	Boston	United States	Bank of America Pavilion	
August 22, 2007	Wantagh	United States	Nikon at Jones Beach Theater	
August 24, 2007	Tunica Resorts	United States	Grand Casino	
August 28, 2007	Orlando	United States	Hard Rock Live	Rescheduled from April 8
August 30, 2007	Boca Raton	United States	Mizner Amphitheater	Rescheduled from April 5
September 1, 2007	Clearwater	United States	Ruth Eckerd Hall	Rescheduled from April 3
September 3, 2007	Atlanta	United States	Chastain Park Amphitheatre	
Europe
October 18, 2007	Dortmund	Germany	Westfalenhalle	
October 20, 2007	Leipzig	Germany	Leipzig Arena	
October 22, 2007	Mannheim	Germany	SAP Arena	
October 24, 2007	Nuremberg	Germany	Nuremberg Arena	
October 26, 2007	Bremen	Germany	AWD-Dome	
October 28, 2007	Glasgow	Scotland	SECC	
October 31, 2007	Newcastle upon Tyne	England	Metro Radio Arena	Cut short after 1hr 18mins.
November 2, 2007	Birmingham	England	NEC Arena	Cancelled
November 4, 2007	Manchester	England	Manchester Evening News Arena	Rescheduled for November 27
November 6, 2007	London	England	Wembley Arena	Cancelled
November 8, 2007	Nottingham	England	Nottingham Arena	Cancelled
November 11, 2007	Cardiff	Wales	Cardiff International Arena	Cancelled
November 2007	Horsens	Denmark		Cancelled
November 2007	Bergen	Norway		Cancelled
November 2007	Stockholm	Sweden		Cancelled
November 2007	Belfast	Northern Ireland		Cancelled
November 27, 2007	Manchester	England	Evening News Arena	Cancelled

== Set list ==
1. "All Revved Up with No Place to Go" (part)
2. "Paradise by the Dashboard Light"
3. "You Took the Words Right out of My Mouth"
4. "Out of the Frying Pan (And Into the Fire)"
5. "Life Is a Lemon and I Want My Money Back"
6. "I'd Do Anything for Love (But I Won't Do That)"
7. "Objects in the Rear View Mirror May Appear Closer than They Are"
8. "Rock and Roll Dreams Come Through"
9. "Seize the Night" (part)
10. "The Monster Is Loose"
11. "Bad for Good"
12. "If It Ain't Broke, Break It"
13. "Blind as a Bat"
14. "Two Out of Three Ain't Bad"
15. "Bat Out of Hell"
16. "Black Betty"
17. "It's All Coming Back to Me Now"
18. "Mercury Blues"
19. "Gimme Shelter"

Other songs:

1. "In the Land of the Pig, The Butcher Is King" (replaced The Monster Is Loose)
2. "I'm Gonna Love Her for Both of Us" (played since Dortmund, planned for cancelled shows)

== Critical reaction ==
The staging of "Paradise by the Dashboard Light" received a poor critical reaction due to the 32 years age difference between Meat Loaf and Aspen Miller, the latter dressed in a small costume. After consistent comments in the press, the staging was changed so that the band were dressed in 1970s clothing for the song so that it was divorced from reality. Meat Loaf even wore a wig for some concerts so that he appeared as he did when the first Bat album was released in 1977.

== Cancellations ==
Meat Loaf cancelled some concerts in April due to ill health.

During a performance in Newcastle upon Tyne, UK on October 31, 2007, at the opening of "Paradise by the Dashboard Light" he suggested that the crowd of thousands should enjoy the performance as it was the last of his career. He attempted to sing the first line of the song, but instead said "Ladies and gentlemen, I love you, thank you for coming, but I can no longer continue." Removing the jacket he was wearing, he thanked the audience for 30 years, said "goodbye forever" and left the stage. The next day his tour promoter, Andrew Miller, refuted that this was the end for Meat Loaf and that he would continue touring after suitable rest.

His management initially claimed that the singer had "acute laryngitis." Nearly a week later he announced that he had been diagnosed with an inter-vocal cyst, and cancelled the remaining dates of his European tour. He announced that he would return, however. He began his Casa de Carne tour in summer 2008 featuring the return of his long-time duet partner Patti Russo. Also, in an attempt to compensate for cutting short the show at Newcastle, he took part in a charity penalty shoot-out at the city's football stadium.
