= Andreas Wiig =

Norwegian snowboarder

Medal record

Men's Snowboarding

X Games
Bronze medal – third place	2004	Slopestyle
Silver medal – second place	2006	Slopestyle
Gold medal – first place	2007	Slopestyle
Gold medal – first place	2008	Slopestyle

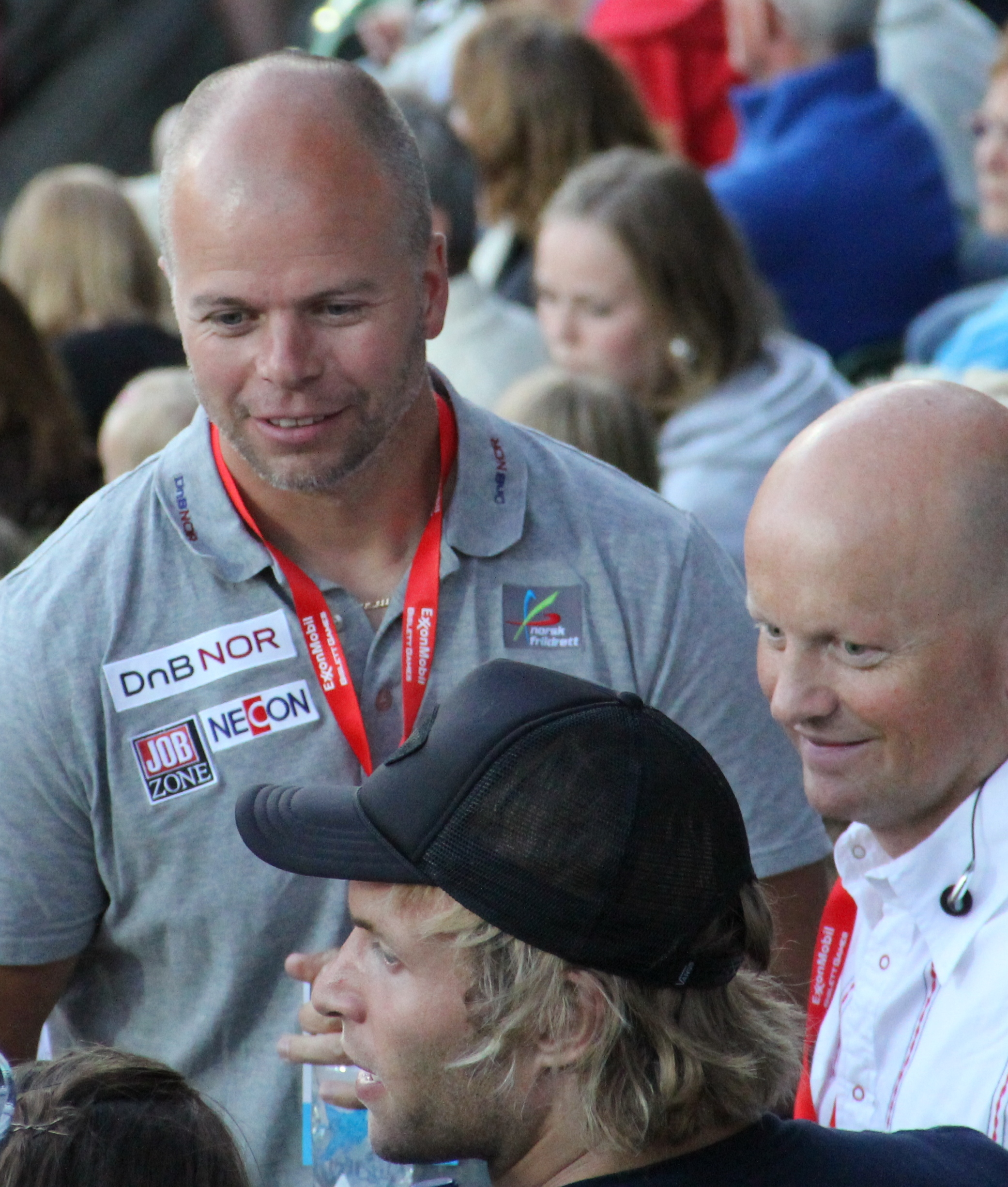
Åsmund Martinsen in conversation with Andreas Wiig and Harald Thingnes

Andreas Ygre Wiig (born 5 March 1981) is a Norwegian professional snowboarder. He rides regular.

Andreas was born in Oslo and grew up in Asker. He made a name for himself when he won two gold medals at the 2007 and 2008 Winter X Games (WXG). In the 2007 Winter X Games' Best Trick competition he went head-to-head and won against Travis Rice, who bailed during both his daring attempts at a Double Cork 1080, and in Slopestyle competition he beat Jussi Oksanen as well as four time defending Slopestyle gold medalist Shaun White, who also was in pursuit of his seventh X-Games gold medal. Wiig already had a bronze medal from WXG 2005 and a silver medal from 2006.

In the 2008 Winter X Games he again beat Shaun White for the slopestyle gold medal. White came 3rd, and Kevin Pearce finished 2nd. After this he signed a contract for $500,000 to move from sponsor Omatic snowboarding to Nitro snowboards which he left in 2009 to join Forum Snowboards. He also rides for Vans Boots and Outerwear, Electric Googles, Vestal Watches, and Rockstar Energy Drink.

Wiig appeared in the music video of Norwegian rock singer Marion Raven's single Falling Away, in 2007 After a few years of dating, Wiig married her in May 2013 and separated in 2015.

Andreas Wiig appeared in the 2007 MDP film Picture This.
