= Falling Away (Marion Raven song) =

Single by Marion Raven

from the album Set Me Free
- Released: April 11, 2007
- Recorded: 2006–2007
- Genre: Rock
- Length: 3:29
- Songwriter(s): Marion Raven; Freddy Wexler; Arthur Lafrentz Bacon; Harris Doran
- Producer(s): DJ Ashba

Marion Raven singles chronology
"Heads Will Roll" (2006)	"Falling Away" (2007)

Alternative cover
- US version

"Falling Away" is the lead single from Marion Raven's album, 'Set Me Free', digitally released on April 11, 2007 to Canada and European iTunes by Eleven Seven Music. The song was released in the digital format to U.S. iTunes on June 12, 2007. The single has two covers, one for European countries and the alternative cover for its U.S. release. The single was released on radio in most Asian countries despite the album being exclusively released in the U.S and Europe; it had reached number 2 in Indonesia by the end of 2007.

== Content ==
According to Raven, "Falling Away" describes how things can get out of one's control, and it is also about the fear of both life and death.

== Music video and snowboarding contest ==
The music video for "Falling Away" features top snowboarders Andreas Wiig (Two-time Gold Medalist 07’ X Games, Honda Vail Session 07 champion, Snowboarder Magazine Jumper of the Year), Hana Beaman (U.S. Open Champion, X Games Silver Medalist, Transworld Magazine Female Rider of the Year) and Mike Casanova (Vans Cup Rail Jam Champion), JJ Johnson and Madison Elsworth was shot by director Matt Ornstein in the middle of a snow storm in Keystone, Colorado. In the video, Raven sings and plays both the acoustic and electric guitar, together with DJ Ashba, while snowboarders performed mid-air snowboarding stunts. "Falling Away" is the first of Raven's songs to be part of a contest in which fans submitted clips of their snowboarding tricks for a chance to appear in the official release of the song's music video. Prize winners won attractive prizes including a prize pack comprising passes and products from Vail Resorts, Keystone Ski Resort, Vans and OIGO.

Raven stated in an interview with EssenSIE magazine that her boyfriend, Andreas Wiig, was the key inspiration for the music video concept. Wiig makes an appearance in the video as one of the snowboarders. Wiig and Raven married May 2013.

== Track listings ==
iTunes version

1. "Falling Away" - 3:29

Promo CD (UK & Germany)

- Break You
- Falling Away
- Here I Am

Promo CD (US)

- Falling Away (Single Version)

== Reception ==
- "Falling Away" peaked at number 5 on the Nicaragua music charts even though the single was not released in Central America.
- German website mix1.de gave "Falling Away" a 6 out of 8 rating.
