= Songs from a Blackbird =

Studio album by Marion Raven
- Released: (Norway) April 5, 2013 (Germany) (Switzerland) (Austria) August 8, 2014; August 22, 2014 (Worldwide via iTunes) (Australia) October 31, 2014
- Recorded: 2012–2013, Norway; 2013–2014 in Norway
- Genre: Acoustic, pop, folk rock
- Length: 42:05
- Label: Sony Music Entertainment, Blackbird Music

Marion Raven chronology
Set Me Free (2007)	Songs from a Blackbird (2013)	Scandal (2014)

Singles from Songs from a Blackbird
- 1. "Colors Turn to Grey" Released: March 9, 2012; 2. "The Minute" Released: March 11, 2013; 3. "Driving" Released: August 2013; 4. "The Minute (Re-release)" Released: July 25, 2014

Songs from a Blackbird (2014)

Songs from a Blackbird is the second studio album by Norwegian singer-songwriter Marion Raven (credited as Marion Ravn), first released in Norway on April 5, 2013. This album marks her first release in six years since 2007's Set Me Free and her first studio album in eight years composed entirely of brand new songs since 2005's Here I Am. Songs from a Blackbird also showcased Marion's musical transition from her past hard rock style into a softer folk-rock music.

Her music transition received mixed reaction especially from fans. Some condemned her for leaving behind her hard-rock style, while some praised her for making an effort to regain her album sales in Norway. Artists like Thom Hell and Lisa Miskovsky made duets with Raven in this album. Songs from a Blackbird peaked at No. 3 on the Norwegian charts.

In order to promote the album, Raven embarked on a nationwide Norwegian tour. Other than performing her new tracks during the concert, Raven also performed her previous tracks but rearranged the music with a more folk-rock touch.

== Track listing ==
No.	Title	Writer(s)	Length
1.	"Start Over"	Marion Raven, Simone Larsen, Thom Hell	5:20
2.	"Driving"	Marion Raven, Simone Larsen, Thomas Kongshavn	3:29
3.	"The Minute"	Marion Raven, Børge Fjordheim	4:02
4.	"Home" (featuring Lisa Miskovsky)	Marion Raven, Lisa Miskovsky	3:34
5.	"On Fire"	Marion Raven, Thomas Kongshavn, Kjeit R. Nilsen	3:18
6.	"Never Leave Me"	Marion Raven, Thom Hell	4:09
7.	"You And I"	Marion Raven, Aleksander With	3:36
8.	"Don't You"	Marion Raven	3:26
9.	"Prove Me Wrong"	Marion Raven, Lene Marlin	3:43
10.	"Rest Your Head" (featuring Thom Hell)	Marion Raven, Thom Hell	3:35
11.	"Safe And Sound"	Marion Raven, Thom Hell	3:47

iTunes bonus tracks
No.	Title	Writer(s)	Length
12.	"All Lies"	Marion Raven, Aleksander With, Tommy Kristiansen	3:26
13.	"Comfort You"	Marion Raven, Lisa Miskovsky	2:49
14.	"Hush"	Marion Raven	3:14
15.	"Colors Turn To Grey"	Kurt Nilsen, Eirik Grønner, Jørn Dahl	3:11

== Songs From a Blackbird (Re-release) ==
A new version of Songs From a Blackbird has released on iTunes worldwide. The album contains 6 new tracks from both Scandal Vol. 1("Scandal", "In Dreams" and "Never Gonna Get It" ) and Scandal Vol. 2("Better Than This", "Running" and "When You Come Around"). The album was released under Epic Records and Sony Music Germany. The album will be for sale in formats CD and LP on August 8 in Germany, Switzerland and Austria.

Marion released under her international stage name, Marion Raven, instead Marion Ravn as she's well known in her home country, Norway. As in Norway, the first international single will be "The Minute", and a new music video was recorded in June in Germany. The music video was released on July 22, 2014.

iTunes album contains 3 bonus tracks, "Start Over", "You And I" and "Don't You" and released on August 5, 2014, for worldwide.

Songs from a Blackbird was released digitally and physically in Australia October 31, 2014.

=== New track listing ===
No.	Title	Writer(s)	Length
1.	"The Minute"	Marion Raven, Børge Fjordheim	4:02
2.	"Driving"	Marion Raven, Simone Larsen, Thomas Kongshavn	3:29
3.	"Scandal"	Marion Raven, Børge Fjordheim	4:03
4.	"Better Than This"	Marion Raven, Børge Fjordheim	3:47
5.	"Home" (featuring Lisa Miskovsky)	Marion Raven, Lisa Miskovsky	3:34
6.	"Colors Turn To Grey"	Kurt Nilsen, Eirik Grønner, Jørn Dahl	3:15
7.	"In Dreams"	Marion Raven, Simone Eriksrud, Thomas Kongshavn	4:02
8.	"Never Gonna Get It"	Marion Raven, Simone Eriksrud, Thomas Kongshavn	4:42
9.	"Running"	Marion Raven, Simone,Eriksrud, Thomas Kongshavn	3:30
10.	"On Fire"	Marion Raven, Thomas Kongshavn, Kjeit R. Nilsen	3:17
11.	"Never Leave Me"	Marion Raven, Thom Hell	4:09
12.	"When You Come Around"	Marion Raven, Børge Fjordheim	3:44

iTunes Bonus Tracks
No.	Title	Writer(s)	Length
13.	"Start Over"	Marion Raven, Simone Larsen, Thom Hell	5:19
14.	"You And I"	Marion Raven, Aleksander With	3:36
15.	"Don't You"	Marion Raven	3:26

== Charts ==
Chart (2013)	Peak position
Norway (VG-lista)	3
