= Break You =

Single by Marion Raven

from the album Here I Am
- B-side: Surfing The Sun; There I Said It
- Released: 2005 2007 (U.S)
- Recorded: 2004
- Genre: Pop rock, post-grunge
- Length: 3:11
- Label: Atlantic Records
- Songwriter(s): Max Martin, Lukasz Gottwald
- Producer(s): Max Martin, Lukasz Gottwald

Marion Raven singles chronology
"End of Me" (2005)	"Break You" (2005)	"Here I Am" (2005)

"Break You" is a pop rock song recorded by Marion Raven and written and produced by Max Martin and Lukasz Gottwald, a.k.a. "Dr. Luke", for Raven's international debut studio album Here I Am (2005). The track was released as the lead single in Japan and Norway and was the second single from the album that was released in Southeast Asia in 2005. The single was highly successful and was well received by critics. The single was released after Raven left Atlantic Records, due to "artistic differences" and joined Eleven Seven Music.

Raven performed an acoustic folk-rock version of Break You during her 2013 Songs from a Blackbird Norwegian tour.

== Content ==
The song's angsty post-grunge vibe and lyrics about bad relationships represents Raven's scorn and anger towards her ex-boyfriend.

== Music video ==
The music video for the song, shot in Los Angeles between a Dogsprison and a strip club, was recorded in March 2005 by director Brett Simon. It shows scenes of Raven trashing her ex-boyfriend's apartment, slicing furniture into half and burning the other half at an alley, signifying that she is getting rid of the half that belongs to her ex-boyfriend. There are also instances where Raven lashes out at hands (most likely to be those of her ex-boyfriend) that try to stop her while she continues ruining the house.

== Singles and track listings ==
Norway and Japan single

1. "Break You" (Album version)
2. "Surfing The Sun" (Japanese Here I Am release version)

Swedish single

1. "Break You" (Album version)
2. "There I Said It" (Unreleased B-side single)

Mexican single

1. "Break You" (Album version)
- Japan promo single
1. "Break You" (Album version)
2. Exclusive picture sleeve" (CD-Rom Bonus content)
3. Different front cover

== Reception ==
- "Break You" is Raven's most successful solo single to date. It anchored Raven as a pop-rock staple in Japan, where it managed to claim the top spot on the Oricon International Charts.
- "Break You" was ranked at No. 69 on MTV Asia's2005 end of year top 100 countdown.
- "Break You" peaked at No. 5 on Capital Disney's "The Top 10" music charts.

== Chart performance ==
Chart (2005)	Peak position
Indonesia Singles Charts	1
Japan Oricon Singles Chart	1
Norway Top 20 Singles	9
Sweden Singles Top 60	51

== 2007 re-release ==
"Break You" was released to U.K. radio stations on March 28, 2007 and is her U.K. debut single from Set Me Free. The track was also part of a rumored EP that served as a teaser, alongside "Falling Away" and "Here I Am", tracks also found on Set Me Free.

Break You EP

1. "Break You" (Album version)
2. "Falling Away" (Album version)
3. "Here I Am" (Album version)
