= End of Me (Marion Raven song) =

Single by Marion Raven

from the album Here I Am
- Released: 2005
- Genre: Pop rock; post-grunge
- Length: 4:29
- Label: Atlantic
- Songwriters: Marion Raven, Max Martin, Rami
- Producers: Max Martin, Rami

Marion Raven singles chronology
"End of Me" (2005)	"Break You" (2005)

"End of Me" is the debut solo single by Marion Raven, released in 2005. The song was written by Raven, Max Martin and Rami for Raven's internationally released album Here I Am (2005). It was released in Southeast Asia and was very successful in the region, reaching the top ten in many countries such as Malaysia, Philippines, Thailand, Taiwan, China, and Singapore.

== Content ==
The track features a unique electric guitar and piano introduction and is about Raven's search for a true identity in an ever-changing pop landscape. Raven said that, if she was not allowed to continue making music, it would be the end of her. "This is the last of illusions", the track also signifies that she is breaking out of her old image of that of M2M and to show the world who she really is. According to Raven, Atlantic Records was not confident of Raven's switch to a more rock image and a different style of songwriting. Raven then had to fight for her rights to record her kind of music, rock music with a pop element, which she terms "Marion Raven Rock".

The song's video was recorded in Taipei, Taiwan. It uses the piano intro of the track, "13 Days", which is also on Here I Am and features Raven trapped in rotating panels of glass that signify her being stereotyped and/or sidelined. Raven then attempts to break free and to assert her true identity through her music. In the music video, Raven can be seen playing the electric guitar during the song's bridge, which marks her increased instrumental scope.

== Reception ==
- The music video for the song peaked at No. 4 on MTV Asia's music video hit list segment.
- At the end of 2005, "End Of Me" was at No. 54 on MTV Asia's end of year top 100 countdown.
