= Meat Loaf: In Search of Paradise =

2007 American documentary film

- Theatrical release poster
- Directed by: Bruce David Klein
- Written by: Bruce David Klein
- Produced by: Bruce David Klein
- Starring: Meat Loaf; Kasim Sulton
- Cinematography: David E. West
- Edited by: Erik Klein
- Distributed by: Universal Studios
- Release dates: August 30, 2007 (Montréal World Film Festival); March 12, 2008 (United States)
- Running time: 88 minutes
- Country: United States
- Language: English

Meat Loaf: In Search of Paradise is a 2007 independent documentary film that captures rocker Meat Loaf and his life in rehearsals and on the road during his 2007 World Tour. It was directed by Bruce David Klein and produced by Bruce David Klein and Paulina Vera Williams by Atlas Media Corp. in association with Voom HD Pictures and 10th Street Entertainment. The film was an official selection of the Montreal World Film Festival in 2007 and of the USA Film Festival in 2008. In Europe, the film was included in the 3 Bats Live DVD. According to Allmovie, "as the stage show gets more and more involved, the singer battles ongoing health concerns."

The film was theatrically released in 75 cities in the U.S. and Canada on March 12, 2008. The premiere was held at New York City's IFC Center. The New York Times called the film "amusing," and Variety said it was "revealing." It is now available on DVD from Universal and can be seen on television worldwide.
