= Here I Am (Marion Raven album) =

Studio album by Marion Raven
- Released: June 6, 2005
- Recorded: 2004–05
- Genres: Pop rock; post-grunge; hard rock; alternative rock
- Length: 56:56
- Label: Atlantic
- Producers: Max Martin; Lukasz "Dr. Luke" Gottwald; Rami

Marion Raven chronology
Here I Am (2005)	Heads Will Roll EP (2006)

Here I Am is the debut solo album by M2M member, Marion Raven, released on June 6, 2005 in Singapore, Malaysia, Thailand, Indonesia and the Philippines. The album was released on June 8, 2005 in Japan, Australia, Mexico, and New Zealand, and released on August 10, 2005 in Norway and Sweden. Raven co-wrote all but one of the songs with several well-known musicians. She played both acoustic and electric guitars as well as the piano and provided background vocals on a number of songs. The album showed her transition from her past M2M pop sound to a dark hard-rock sound. Her musical transition was well received by critics internationally.

The album debuted at No. 6 in her native Norway and at No. 13 in Japan and was highly successful in countries such as Thailand, Singapore, Malaysia, and the Philippines. Raven went on a tour of Southeast Asian countries to promote the album in late 2005. However, lack of promotion on Atlantic Records part and delays in releasing the album in the U.S. prompted Raven to leave the music company.

The album was released in the United States in 2007, with a different track listing and title, Set Me Free, incorporating new and old songs, including an acoustic version of "Let Me Introduce Myself" and the re-recorded version of "Heads Will Roll", which preceded the album in October 2006, as part of the Heads Will Roll EP.

Raven talked about "13 Days" and other songs on Here I Am in an interview in 2005,

"13 Days" is about a Danish boy I met. He came and visited me in Norway, at my parents' house; before I got to know him well. He was there for thirteen days. It didn't go well. We had nothing to talk about. He was really boring and I felt as if I was trapped in my own house. And on the day he was going home he wrecked my car. My dad had to come and pick us up. Then he almost missed his flight and since then I haven't heard a word from him. No calls, no emails. I've written three songs about those thirteen days. Three songs about the same guy. I get really pissed when I sing them. I hope he buys my record.

== Background and composition ==
Raven rose to prominence as half of the musical duo M2M, alongside Marit Larsen. In 2002, M2M disbanded after the release of two albums and some international success. Following the break-up, M2M's American record label, Atlantic Records, approached Raven with an offer for a solo record contract. In later interviews, she explained that she would otherwise not have been able to work with others until at least 2005, as she had a pre-existing contract with the label. Her debut album was reported to have a budget of NOK 7.3 million, or approximately one million US dollars at the time.

In the autumn of 2002, Raven began recording songs for her solo project with Norwegian producer Ole Evenrud at his studio in Halden; these songs were ultimately never released. Raven was introduced to Max Martin by her then-manager Thomas Erdtman. Martin believed that he had songs that could be suitable for Raven, but soon they started collaborating on the album's music and lyrics. Songwriting and recording started in January 2003 at Metronome in Stockholm and the album was reported to be finished by early January 2004. In an interview to BON, Raven stated that they "had no fixed date by which we had to be finished. We could hold on as long as we felt necessary."

Several other songwriters joined the project, including Nikki Sixx from Mötley Crüe (whom Raven met in June 2004 when his band Brides of Destruction performed in Norway), Art Alexakis from Everclear (who sings on "At the End of the Day"), Jimmy Harry, as well as Canadian singer-songwriter Chantal Kreviazuk and Raine Maida from the band Our Lady Peace.

== Singles ==
- "End of Me" was the first single from the album to be released exclusively in Southeast Asia. It peaked at No. 4 on MTV Asia's video hitlist and was a top 10 song in Malaysia, Taiwan, China, and Singapore.
- "Break You" was released in Mexico, Japan, Sweden and Norway. It went No. 1 in Japan and Indonesia and claimed the No. 9 spot in Norway.
- "Here I Am" was the album's title track, and third single, that was only officially released in Norway, around the same time "Break You" was released. It peaked at No. 20 on the official Norwegian charts and reached No. 3 on the TV2 Music Chart. Raven performed the song live in the Nordic Music Awards. The music video of "Here I Am" featured pictures of Raven's grandfather when he was a young man. Though the single only released as singles in Norway, the music video still to be played in other countries where the album was released.
- "Little by Little", the fifth track of the album, was released as a radio-only single in Asia.

== Track listing ==
Japan and Scandinavia release track listing

Main track
No.	Title	Writer(s)	Length
1.	"Get Me Out of Here"	Marion Raven, Greg Kurstin, Richie Andruska, John Deley, Jamie Siegel	3:30
2.	"Break You"	Max Martin, Dr. Luke	3:11
3.	"Crawl"	Marion Raven, Danielle Brisebois, Jimmy Harry	3:48
4.	"Here I Am"	Marion Raven, Max Martin, Rami Yacoub	3:49
5.	"Little by Little"	Marion Raven, Max Martin, Rami Yacoub, Peter Svensson	4:00
6.	"End of Me"	Marion Raven, Max Martin, Rami Yacoub	4:29
7.	"13 Days"	Marion Raven, Chantal Kreviazuk, Raine Maida	3:08
8.	"For You I'll Die"	Marion Raven	4:50
9.	"Let Me Introduce Myself"	Marion Raven	3:42
10.	"Heads Will Roll (EP)"	Marion Raven, Nikki Sixx, James Michael	3:16
11.	"At the End of the Day" (featuring Art Alexakis of Everclear)	Marion Raven, Art Alexakis	4:00
12.	"Six Feet Under"	Marion Raven, Max Martin, Rami Yacoub	3:26
13.	"Gotta Be Kidding"	Marion Raven, Max Martin, Rami Yacoub, Camela Leivert	3:47
14.	"In Spite of Me"	Marion Raven, Max Martin, Rami Yacoub, Alexandra Talomaa	4:16

Bonus Tracks
No.	Title	Writer(s)	Length
15.	"Surfing the Sun"	Marion Raven, Nikki Sixx, James Michael,	3:51
16.	"There I Said It"	Marion Raven, Max Martin, Rami Yacoub	3:46

The Japanese release also has a bonus DVD with 'Break You' and 'Here I Am' music videos.

Southeast Asia and Taiwan releases track listing

Main track
No.	Title	Writer(s)	Length
1.	"End of Me"	Marion Raven, Max Martin, Rami	4:29
2.	"Here I Am"	Marion Raven, Max Martin, Rami Yacoub	3:49
3.	"Break You"	Max Martin, Dr. Luke	3:11
4.	"Crawl"	Marion Raven, Danielle Brisebois, Jimmy Harry	3:48
5.	"Little by Little"	Marion Raven, Max Martin, Rami Yacoub, Peter Svensson	4:00
6.	"Get Me Out of Here"	Marion Raven, Greg Kurstin, Richie Andruska, John Deley, Jamie Siegel	3:30
7.	"13 Days"	Marion Raven, Chantal Kreviazuk, Raine Maida	3:08
8.	"For You I'll Die"	Marion Raven	4:50
9.	"Let Me Introduce Myself"	Marion Raven	3:42
10.	"Heads Will Roll (EP)"	Marion Raven, Nikki Sixx, James Michael	3:16
11.	"At the End of the Day" (featuring Art Alexakis of Everclear)	Marion Raven, Art Alexakis	4:00
12.	"Six Feet Under"	Marion Raven, Max Martin, Rami Yacoub	3:26
13.	"Gotta Be Kidding"	Marion Raven, Max Martin, Rami Yacoub, Camela Leivert	3:47
14.	"In Spite of Me"	Marion Raven, Max Martin, Rami Yacoub, Alexandra Talomaa	4:16

- The Here I Am DVD Limited Edition for Taiwan was released in 2006 only. It featured the making of "End Of Me" and the "End Of Me" music video.

Bonus tracks and B-Sides:

1. "Surfing the Sun" (Marion Raven, Nikki Sixx, James Michael) 3:53 *Japanese Bonus Track
2. "There I Said It" (Marion Raven, Max Martin, Rami) 3:48 *Single B-Side for Swedish "Break You" and Norwegian "Here I Am" singles

Tracks that did not make it into the final cut of the album were "Forgot His Name", "Brand New Me", "Disconnected", "Have Mercy", "Bittersweet" and "Gutter". Little is known about these songs, but a track called "Get Over Me" leaked to the web in 2006.

== Reception ==
Professional ratings
Review scores
Source	Rating
ABCNYHETER.no	4/6 stars
The New Paper online	4/5 stars
Melodic.Net	2.5/5 stars
Play.com	4.5/5 stars

- The album sold over 135,000 copies in Asia in its first three months.
- On the online version of the Singapore newspaper, The New Paper, music reviewer Seto Nu-Wen wrote, "Her (Raven's) music is more heartfelt than contrived, thus avoiding the commercial trappings of your average teenage punk-rock debut."
- On her "Here I Am" tour across Asia, Japan and Scandinavia, MTV Asia praised Raven on shedding the cuteness of M2M and sporting an assertive voice of vengeful yet positive tunes backed with a strong radio-friendly pop-rock vibe.
- At the end of 2005, Raven's singles "End Of Me" and "Break You" were at No. 54 and No. 69 respectively on MTV Asia's year end top 100 countdown, with "End Of Me" beating songs like "Ghost Of You" (No. 57) and "Misunderstood" (No. 58), by My Chemical Romance and Robbie Williams respectively.

== Chart performance ==
=== Charts ===
Chart (2005)	Peak position
Japanese Oricon Album Chart	13
Singapore Album Chart	3
Malaysia Album Chart	4
Norway Top 40 Albums	6

== Credits ==
- Marion Raven — Guitar (Acoustic), Guitar (Electric), Writer, Piano, Vocals, Vocals (background)
- Allen Kovac — Management
- Max Martin — Guitar, Writer, Producer, Programming, Vocals (background), Engineer, Instrumentation
- Steve Thompson — Arranger, Producer, String Arrangements, Mixing
- Lukasz "Doctor Luke" — Gottwald Instrumentation
- Hans Akeson, Ulrika Frankmar, Elisabeth Arnberg Ranmo, Håkan Roos — Viola
- Art Alexakis — Guitar, Vocals
- Andreas Andersson, Mikael Sjogren, Bo Soderstrom, Martin Stensson, Torbjorn Bernhardsson, Hanna Göran, Svein H. Martinsen — Violin
- Monica Jönsson, Astrid Lindell, Kati Raitinen — Cello
- Tomas Andersson — Guitar, Violin
- Kenny Aronoff — Percussion, Drums
- Richard Nettermalm, Johan Reivén — Drums
- John Degrazio — Guitar (Acoustic), Guitar (Electric)
- John Deley — Piano, Strings, Keyboards, Programming
- Peter Svensson — Guitar
- Liz Barrett — Art Direction
- P.R. Brown — Design, Photography
- Dana Marasca — Stylist
- Andrew Feigenbaum, Craig Kallman, Craig Rosen — A&R
- Janne Hansson — String Engineer
- Michael Ilbert — Engineer, Digital Editing, Mixing
- Henrik, Ulf — Janson String Arrangements
- Jesse Levy — String Arrangements
- George Marino — Mastering
- Mike Plotnikoff — Engineer, Mixing
- Bryan Russell — Assistant Engineer, Mixing Assistant
- Jamie Siegel — Programming, Engineer, Pre-Production
