= Set Me Free (Marion Raven album) =

Studio album by Marion Raven
- Released: (Germany) 8 June 2007 (United Kingdom) 18 June 2007 (Netherlands) 25 June 2007 (United States) 24 July 2007
- Recorded: 2005–2007
- Genres: Hard rock; Alternative rock; Pop rock; Post-grunge
- Length: 45:00; 40:33 (iTunes version)
- Label: Eleven Seven Music/Trans Former Records/Interscope Records/Townsend Records
- Producers: Dr. Luke, Marion Raven, Max Martin, James Michael

Marion Raven chronology
Here I Am (2005)	Set Me Free (2007)	Songs from a Blackbird (2013)

Singles from Set Me Free
- 1. "Falling Away" Released: 11 April 2007

Set Me Free is Marion Raven's North American and European debut album released under indie label Eleven Seven Music. The album incorporates a mixture of fresh tracks and previously released tracks, with some revised versions, from her Asian and Scandinavian debut album, Here I Am. She also played the piano, acoustic and electric guitars on the record. Set Me Free headlines Raven's inclination to harder rocking songs and a darker lyrical scope. The album has been released in Germany and the U.K. with a digital release on the Dutch and US versions of iTunes. Interscope released the album in Canada, where Raven performed in ten Canadian cities as the opening act on Meat Loaf's March 2007 Arena tour.

== Singles ==
- "Falling Away" was released as the album's lead single on 11 April 2007 in Europe and Canada and 12 June in the U.S.
- "Break You", originally from Marion's previous album, was released as a promotional single on 16 April 2007 in the United Kingdom.

== Composition ==
- The songs "Break You", "Crawl", "Here I Am", "For You I'll Die" and the duet "At the End of the Day" were first released in Raven's 2005 international debut album, Here I Am, while the re-recorded version of "Heads Will Roll", "13 Days", and "All I Wanna Do Is You", and the acoustic version of "Let Me Introduce Myself", are tracks that preceded the album, appearing on the EP Heads Will Roll EP, that was released on 31 October 2006.
- "13 Days" is the only collaborative track that has been released without any alterations in both debut albums, Here I Am and Set Me Free as well as the Heads Will Roll EP.
- "For You I'll Die" was inspired by the love Jim Morrison shared with his long-time companion Pamela Courson, coupled with their stormy relationship, separations and reunions. Raven wrote the ballad after reading the American singer's biography:
  I was in this Jim Morrison period where I was listening to the box set, reading his biography and watching the movie, I was very touched by Jim's relationship with Pamela, how she would always be there for him. The song is about being willing to do that for someone, but getting nothing in return except a spot in the grave next to them.
- Raven wrote the duet, "At The End Of The Day", which features a collaborative effort with Art Alexakis from Everclear, in memory of the first time she fell in love.
- The acoustic version of "Let Me Introduce Myself" is a hidden track on the album that comes 40–50 seconds after "All I Wanna Do Is You". Raven has denied that "Let Me Introduce Myself" is directed at Zac Hanson's now wife Kate Hanson.

== Reception ==
Professional ratings
Review scores
Source	Rating
CDstarts.de	link
Commonsense Media	link
Max.de	link
Mix1.de	6/8 link
Musiqtone	link
Soundbase-online	9/12 link

- Set Me Free was made available while Raven was on tour with Meat Loaf, as an opening act, in the entire month of June 2007, with Raven being present to autograph the albums. The album was sold out when it was made available in Ottawa, Ontario, Canada, while Raven was part of Meat Loaf's Canadian tour.
- Townsend Records praised the album for being "Heated, intense and heart-felt".
- German website Soundbase-online gave the album 9 out of 12 stars, commending Raven's ability to emote her feelings through her songs.
- Max.de praised Raven for using life as an inspiration for her music, and on being a genuine pop artist.
- Mix1.de commended the mixture of heart-felt histrionics of grief and of illusions on many of the album's tracks.
- BBC reviewer, Harry Holgate, praised Raven's vocal ability as being on par with Kelly Clarkson and Avril Lavigne as well as commending Raven's invective nature as better than either of them. However, Set Me Free was criticised for its long production time and the lack of a consistent band, questioning Raven's decision to leave Atlantic Records.

== Track listing ==
No.	Title	Writer(s)	Length
1.	"Set Me Free"	Marion Raven, Nikki Sixx, DJ Ashba	3:52
2.	"Falling Away"	Raven, Freddy Wexler, Arthur Lafrentz Bacon, Harris Doran	3:31
3.	"Crawl"	Raven, Danielle Brisebois, Jimmy Harry	3:49
4.	"Here I Am"	Raven, Max Martin, Rami	3:52
5.	"Thank You for Loving Me"	Raven, DJ Ashba	4:12
6.	"13 Days"	Raven, Chantal Kreviazuk, Raine Maida	3:07
7.	"Break You"	Martin, Dr. Luke	3:12
8.	"Heads Will Roll (EP)"	Raven, Siam Kamli Shnurov, Nikki Sixx, James Michael	3:19
9.	"For You I'll Die"	Raven	4:53
10.	"At the End of the Day"	Raven, Art Alexakis	4:04
11.	"All I Wanna Do is You"	Raven, Keith Nelson, Siam Kamli Shnurov	3:10

European bonus track
No.	Title	Writer(s)	Length
12.	"Let Me Introduce Myself" (acoustic)	Raven	3:12

Notes

- The enhanced version of the album contains the music video for the single, "Falling Away".
- The album was made available on the US and European iTunes on 26 June 2007 but its online release was only officially announced, on Raven's MySpace, on 28 July 2007. The iTunes version of the album does not include the acoustic hidden track, "Let Me Introduce Myself".
