= Marion Raven =

Norwegian singer (born 1984)

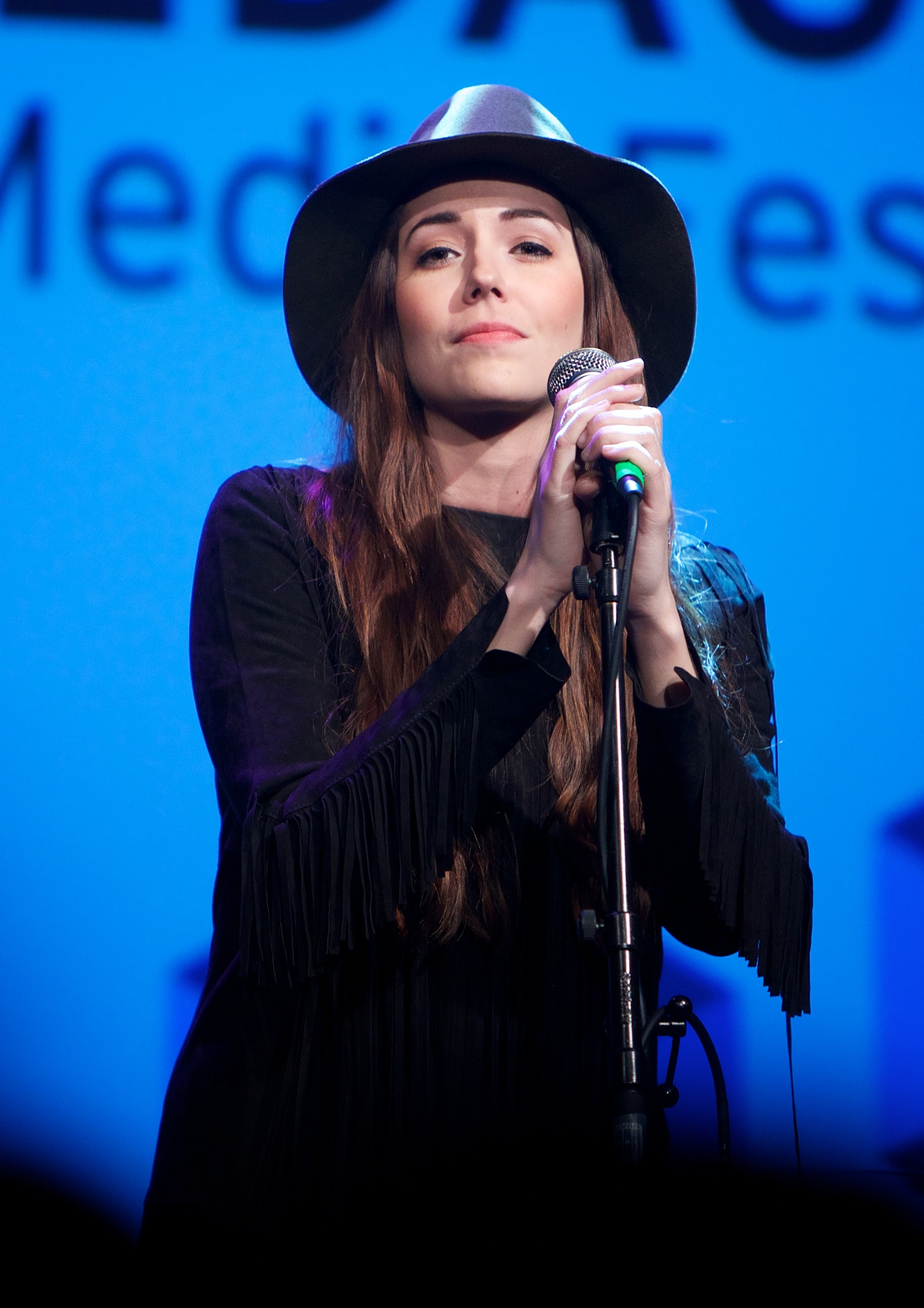
- Raven in 2013

Background information
- Also known as: Marion Ravn
- Born: Marion Elise Ravn; 25 May 1984 (age 42); Lørenskog, Norway
- Genres: Pop; pop rock; post-grunge; alternative rock
- Occupations: Singer, songwriter
- Years active: 1993–present
- Labels: EMI Records (1996–1998); Atlantic (1998–2006); Eleven Seven (2006–2010); Playroom Music (2010–2012); Blackbird Music, Sony Music, RCA, Epic (2013–2016); Blackbird Music (Distribution by The Orchard (2013–present)
- Member of: M2M
- Spouse: Andreas Wiig (m. 2013–2015)
- Website: marionravn.no

Marion Elise Ravn (born 25 May 1984), better known as Marion Raven, is a Norwegian singer and songwriter. She formed the pop duo M2M with Marit Larsen, though they ceased performing together in 2002. Raven was later signed as a solo artist by Atlantic Records with the release of her solo debut album, Here I Am, in 2005. In 2006, Raven was signed to the indie record label Eleven Seven, and in 2007 re-released the songs on her debut album along with a few new songs on an album titled Set Me Free. In 2012, Raven began production of her second album, Songs from a Blackbird, which was released in 2013. Her sixth studio album, Ti Ville Hester, was released in 2023. Ravn and Larsen reformed M2M in 2024.

Raven has also written tracks for other artists such as Pixie Lott. She has also lent her voice to the Norwegian version of Tangled.

== Early life ==
Raven was born in Lørenskog, Norway; her father is a teacher. She has an older brother and two younger sisters. Her surname is of Norse origin, with Ravn meaning Raven, which she adopted as her stage name Marion Raven as well as her trademark raven logo. Raven enjoyed singing from a young age, sometimes writing lyrics for the songs she sang. Raven joined the gospel choir in a local church at the age of 5. At age 7, she went on to be part of the St. Laurentius choir, which has many historical links in Lørenskog, and was started in 1965 by, and is still being run by her vocal coach for several years, Kjell Walther Christensen. By the time she was eight, Raven began playing the piano and took piano lessons from Sif Anna Lisa Ødegård, married to Kjell Walther Christensen. She also attended ballet lessons, as well as performing ballet on stage. In 1993, she acted in the musical "Sound of Music", on the "Norwegian Broadway". She recorded a children's musical titled Vettene Vinner (Vettene Wins), with the musical group "Vettene", meaning "small trolls that protect nature", and was part of the group's record "Vettene på gamlespor" (Vettene on Old Tracks). At age 10, Raven acted in stage productions of Bugsy Malone and The Wizard of Oz.

== M2M ==
In 1995, Raven's father arranged for her to make a demo in a studio in Oslo, together with her childhood friend, Marit Larsen. The duo got a record deal with EMI Norway and formed M2M. A year later, they produced children album titled, "Marit og Marion synger kjente barnesanger" which means "Marit and Marion Sing Well-Known Children Songs". M2M was nominated for the Norwegian Grammy, Spellemannprisen, the following year.

In 1998, M2M started recording pop demos in English and struck a record deal with Atlantic Records. The two collaborated with many songwriters from around the world and produced their multi-platinum debut album, Shades of Purple, that was released in 2000, with the lead single, "Don't Say You Love Me" featuring on the soundtrack of Pokémon: The First Movie. The song was co-produced by Jimmy Bralower and Peter Zizzo (Celine Dion), and mixed by Tom Lord-Alge. It peaked on the Billboard Hot 100 at No. 21, selling 39,000 units in a week, according to SoundScan. Their second album, The Big Room, which was recorded in a studio in Bearsville in Woodstock, New York, was released in 2002. After world tours to promote The Big Room ended, M2M joined Jewel on her This Way world tour as an opening act. M2M later disbanded in September 2002 after Atlantic removed them as the opening act for the rest of the tour.

Raven was offered a recording contract with Atlantic Records, though the offer was later revoked. She co-wrote "Pointless Relationship", that was the lead single of Australian singer Tammin Sursok's debut album Whatever Will Be. She also collaborated on the track "That Day", a song released by Norwegian pop singer Maria Arredondo, from Arredondo's 2004 follow-up album Not Going Under, and co-wrote the song "Disconnected", a song included on Lindsay Lohan's debut album Speak in 2004.

== Solo career ==
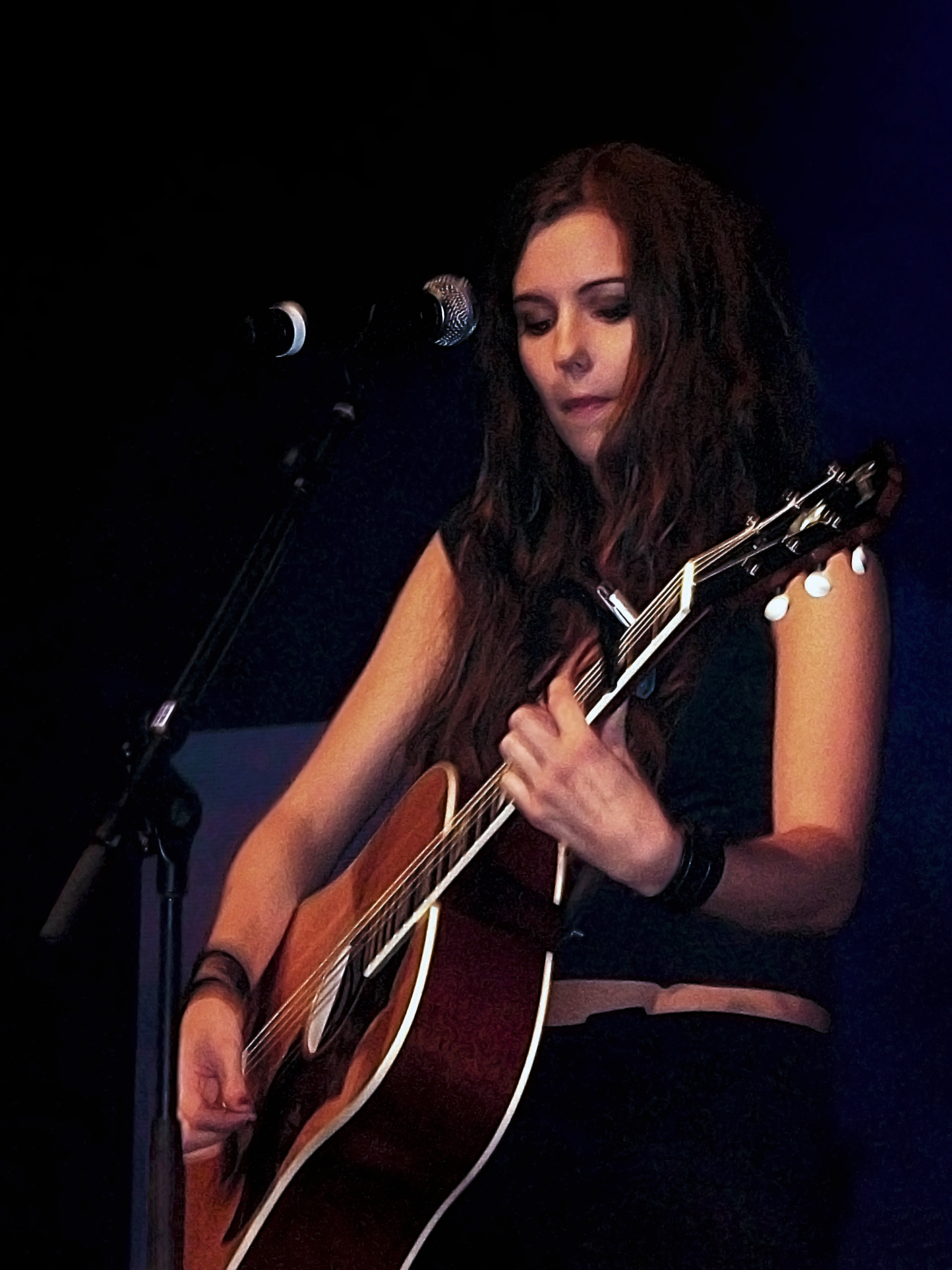
Raven performing in 2007

=== 2005: Here I Am ===
Upon signing her deal with Atlantic Records, Marion Raven set about recording her debut album, and worked with Swedish songwriters/producers Max Martin and Rami, as well as Canadian singer-songwriter Chantal Kreviazuk and her husband Raine Maida from 2003 to 2005. Initially, the record company was not confident of Raven's switch to a more rock image and a darker, more personal style of songwriting. Raven had to fight to record her kind of music, rock music with a pop element. The resulting 14-track list, including 2 bonus tracks, cultivated a more rock/pop sound and was titled Here I Am. The album saw Raven's transformation from the candy-pop music of M2M to a more angsty, rock-oriented singer, and was released in Scandinavia, Japan, Latin America and Southeast Asia.

Here I Am spawned three singles, "End of Me", "Break You" and "Here I Am". Break You holds the record as Raven's top-selling single internationally. All three singles were successful in the Asian region where she further promoted the album with a tour. The album was released in Raven's home country on 10 August 2005 debuting at No. 6.

=== 2006–2007: Set Me Free ===
In early 2006, it was announced that Raven quit her contract with Atlantic Records due to "artistic differences". Raven later confirmed that she was now signed to indie label Eleven Seven Music, which was created by her management 10th Street Entertainment.

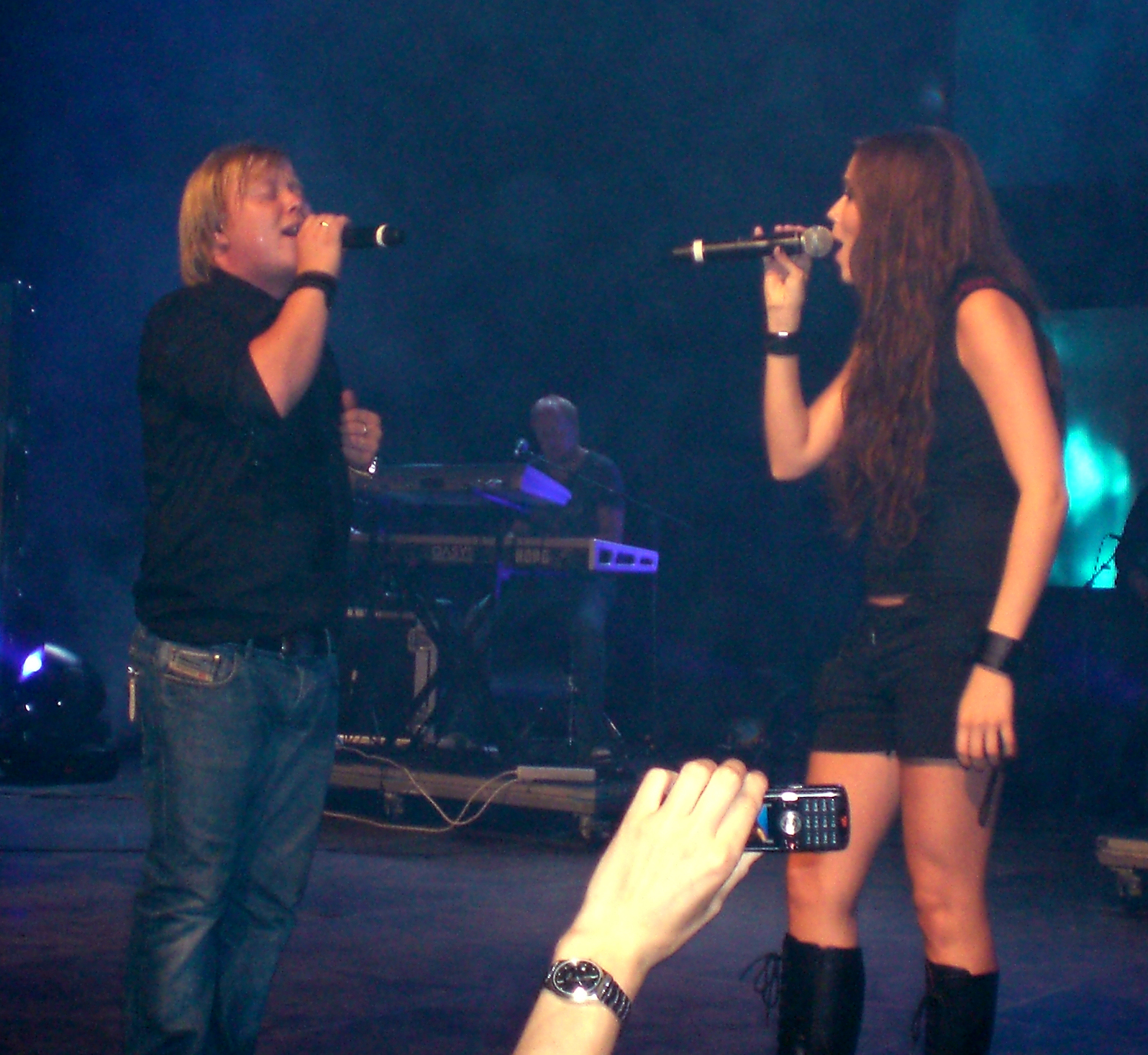
World Idol winner Kurt Nilsen and Raven performing "It's All Coming Back to Me Now" at Tusenfryd amusement park in StatoilHydro on 22 August 2007

Raven later performed a duet with rock musician Meat Loaf on a version of the song "It's All Coming Back to Me Now", released as the lead single from Loaf's tenth studio album Bat Out of Hell III: The Monster Is Loose in October 2006. The track peaked at No. 1 in Norway and reached the top ten in Germany and the United Kingdom. Raven later joined Loaf on an extensive tour through Canada and Europe in February 2007.

In 2004, she recorded the theme song for the US dub of W.I.T.C.H., a Jetix animated series based on the comic of the same name.

Raven later confirmed that her new album would contain new and old tracks from her Norwegian debut as well as re-recorded tracks such as "Heads Will Roll", which received the help of American musician Nikki Sixx and was released as an EP in October 2006. Prior to the release of Raven's album Set Me Free in March 2007, she toured around The Netherlands, Germany and the United Kingdom to help promote it. Raven later embarked on another promotional tour across the UK and performed in British schools. Later between later July and August, she became a supporting act on American singer-songwriter Pink's I'm Not Dead Tour in Germany. The album was later released in June 2007 and sprawled two singles; "Falling Away" and a re-release of her previous single "Break You" from her Norwegian debut album.

=== 2008–2010: Nevermore ===
In 2008, Raven made a cameo appearance in the music video for the song "Saints of Los Angeles" by American heavy metal band Mötley Crüe. In 2010 she became a panellist judge on the Norwegian version of the talent show The X Factor and later on Norwegian Idol.

Originally, Raven recorded her third studio album, Nevermore, in 2009 and penned it for a 2010 release, but due to the internal issues with her record label Eleven Seven Music, it was never released. It dropped two singles, "Flesh and Bone" and "Found Someone", exclusively released in Scandinavia.

=== 2012–2014: Songs from a Blackbird ===
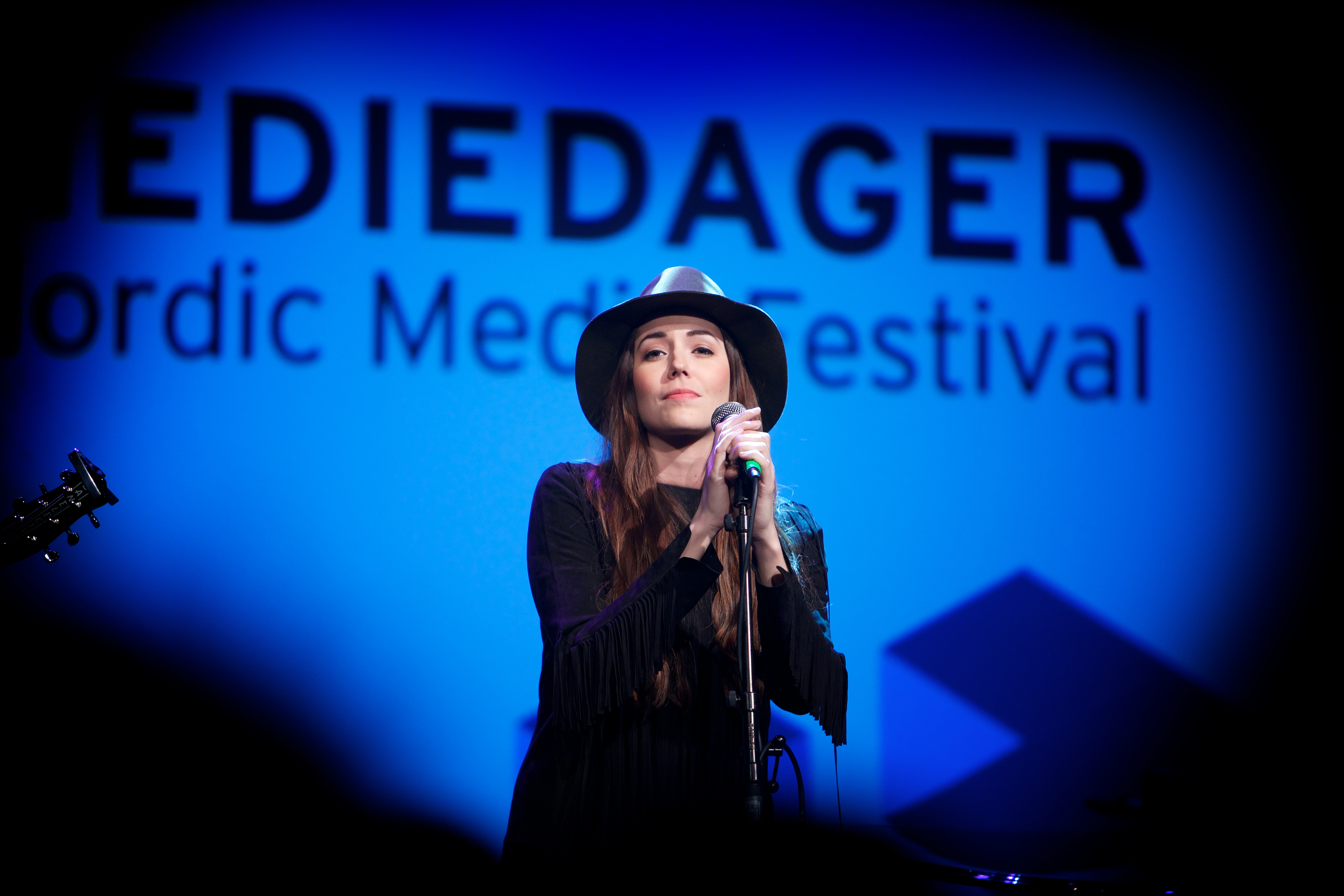
Raven at the Nordic Media Festival (2013)

Raven later released the single "Colors Turn to Grey" in March 2012 and stated in October 2012 that she is working on material for a new album. In March 2013, Marion released the single "The Minute" from her second album Songs from a Blackbird, which was released on 5 April 2013 in Norway. Being her first album in eight years, Songs from a Blackbird managed to peak at No. 3 in Norway. The album was further promoted with a third single – the track "Driving" – and a Norwegian Tour in 2013.

==== International Version ====
Before an international version released, Marion re-released "The Minute" for an international single via iTunes on 25 July 2014. In August and 31 October 2014, an international version of Songs from a Blackbird released worldwide and Australia, respectively. It incorporates a mixture of Norwegian version and three new songs from both Scandal Vol. 1 and Scandal Vol. 2. For Germany, Switzerland, Austria and Australia, it released physically whereas the worldwide, including Germany, Switzerland, Austria and Australia, it was only released via the iTunes Store.

=== 2014–2015: Scandal Vol. 1 and Scandal Vol. 2 ===
In January 2014, Marion announced plans to record her third studio album after signing with Sony Music. The album's title was later announced as Scandal while its release date was set to be in September 2014, later the album was divided in two parts, Scandal Vol. 1 released on September 22, 2014, and Scandal Vol. 2 released on February 2, 2015.

=== 2019: Mellom disse 4 vegger ===
In May 2019, Ravn released her first Norwegian-language single "Tyv". In July 2019, she released "Fritt fall" as the second single from her Norwegian-language project. The album, Mellom disse 4 vegger, was released on 11 October 2019. The album features a duet with Magnus Grønneberg, whom she collaborated with during the Hver gang vi møtes series.

== Personal life ==
Raven briefly dated Zac Hanson while M2M were on tour with Hanson in 2000. Raven stated that the M2M song "Everything" was written about her break up with Hanson and her heartbreak after the tour finished and he did not call her. A second song was written by Raven about the relationship, which she called "Jack" instead of "Zac", and was released by Pixie Lott.

After years of dating, Raven married professional snowboarder Andreas Wiig in 2013 and divorced in 2015. In September 2023, Raven gave birth to a son.

== Hver gang vi møtes ==
Raven also starred the second season of Norwegian reality TV show Hver gang vi møtes, alongside other Norwegian music artists Morten Abel, Ole Paus, Anita Skorgan, Magnus Grønneberg, Kurt Nilsen and Lene Marlin.

Marion Raven performances from other guest artists during the series were:

- "Casanova" (Originally recorded by Anita Skorgan)
- "Bullet Me" (Originally recorded by Morten Abel)
- "Unforgivable Sinner" (Originally recorded by Lene Marlin)
- "Never Easy" (Originally recorded by Kurt Nilsen)
- "Når Du Sover" (Originally recorded by Magnus Gronneberg)
- "Nerven I Min Sang" (Originally recorded by Ole Paus)

Fellow artists who sang Raven / M2m songs on Hver gang vi møtes – Marion Raven's Day were:

- "Found Someone" Covered by: Lene Marlin
- "For You I'll Die" Covered by: Anita Skorgan
- "Here I Am" Covered by: Magnus Gronneberg
- "Don't Say you Love Me" was originally recorded by M2M and Covered by: Ole Paus
- "Girl In your Dreams" was originally recorded by M2M and Covered by: Morten Abel
- "Everything" was originally recorded by M2M and Covered by: Kurt Nilsen

== Other projects ==
Raven has written several songs for other artists including:

- (2004) "Completely In Love" for Norwegian pop-rock singer Tommy Michaelsen's album Completely in Love.
- (2004) "That Day" for Norwegian pop singer Maria Arredondo's album, Not Going Under.
- (2004) "Pointless Relationship" for Australian singer Tammin Sursok's album, Whatever Will Be.
- (2004) "Disconnected" for American singer Lindsay Lohan's album Speak
- (2007) "Jack" for British singer Pixie Lott's debut album, Turn It Up.
- (2009) "Forgot His Name" recorded by Tanita Kolsås for the X Factor Norway series.
- (2009) "It's Not Over" recorded by May Kronfeld also known as May K, a music video is available for this song.
- (2010) Raven's song "In Spite of Me" included on her debut album Here I Am was covered by Swedish pop-rock singer Erik Grönwall for his second album Somewhere Between a Rock and a Hard Place.
- (2011) Marion voiced the role of Rapunzel in the Norwegian dub of Disney's movie Tangled.
- (2016) Marion also voiced the role of Poppy for the Norwegian dub of DreamWorks Animation's movie Trolls.
- (2017) Marion got the role of Eponine for the Norwegian staging of Les Misérables, the play will be premiered on September 8, at the Hotel Folketeateret in Oslo.
- (2017) Marion repeats her role of Rapunzel for the Norwegian dub of Tangled, this time for the animated TV Series.
- (2024) One of two hosts of Melodi Grand Prix 2024, the Norwegian selection for Eurovision Song Contest 2024

== Awards and nominations ==
- In 2005 Raven was nominated for the Nordic Music Award with her album Here I Am held in Norway.
- Raven was nominated for the "Best Norwegian Act" at the MTV Europe Music Awards 2006.
- In 2015 Raven won the award for 'Best International Act' at the "Musik Fach-Awards" 2015, Raven was also nominated in the category of "Album of the Year" and performed an acoustic version of her single "The Minute" during the ceremony.

== Tours ==
Year	Tour	Areas	Role
Mid-late 2005	Here I Am Promo Tour	Japan, Norway, Southeast Asia	Headlining
Early-mid-2007	Meat Loaf Seize the Night Tour / Three Bats Live Tour	Canada, US, Europe	As supporting act
July–August 2007	Pink I'm Not Dead Tour	Germany	As supporting act
November–December 2011	Kurt Nilsen Christmas Tour	Norway	Supporting act/Special guest
October 2013	Marion Ravn Norwegian Tour	Norway	Headlining
February–March 2015	Lionel Richie All the Hits All Night Long	Europe	Supporting act
February–April 2015	Marion Raven Scandal Tour	Norway	Headlining
February–March 2018	Marion Ravn Akustisk Turné	Norway	Headlining

== Charity appearances ==
- Raven performed in the President Star Charity Concert in Singapore while on tour in mid-late 2005.
- Raven performed at the Norwegian Salvation Army, Lillestrøm Charity Concert and the Pink ribbon Show in Oslo, Norway in late 2005.
- Raven performed in Mainz-Kastel, Reduit for the UNICEF benefit show to raise funds to support Africa in September 2007.
- Raven performed alongside 2006 winner of Idol Norway, Aleksander Denstad With, at the Norwegian "Idol Gives Back" show in December 2007.

== Discography ==
=== Studio albums and EPs ===
List of albums, with selected chart positions and certifications
Title	Album details	Peak chart positions
Title	Album details	NOR
Here I Am	Released: 6 June 2005; Label: Atlantic; Format: CD, digital download	6
Heads Will Roll	Released: 31 October 2006; Label: Eleven Seven; Format: CD, digital download	—
Set Me Free	Released: 8 June 2007; Label: Eleven Seven; Format: CD, digital download	—
Nevermore	Released: Canceled/unreleased; Label: Eleven Seven; Format: –	—
Songs from a Blackbird	Released: 5 April 2013, in Norway; Label: Sony Music Norway; Format: CD, digital download, LP; Re-released 8 August 2014, Worldwide; Epic Records / Blackbird Music; Format: CD, LP, digital download	3
Scandal, Vol. 1	Released: 22 September 2014; Label: Sony Music Norway / RCA; Format: CD, LP, digital download	24
Scandal, Vol. 2	Released: 2 February 2015; Label: Sony Music Norway / RCA; Format: CD, LP, digital download	26
Mellom Disse 4 Vegger	Released: 11 October 2019; Label: Blackbird Music; Format: LP, Digital Download	3
Ti Ville Hester	Released: 10 February 2023; Label: Blackbird Music; Format: LP, Digital Download	
"—" denotes a recording that did not chart or was not released in that territory.

=== Singles ===
Year	Single	Peak positions		Album
Year	Single	NOR	SWE	Album
2005	"End of Me"	—	—	Here I Am
2005	"Break You"	9	51	Here I Am
2005	"Here I Am"	20	—	Here I Am
2005	"Little by Little"	—	—	Here I Am
2006	"Heads Will Roll"	—	—	Heads Will Roll EP
2007	"Falling Away"	—	—	Set Me Free
2007	"Break You" (re-release)	—	—	Set Me Free
2010	"Flesh and Bone"	—	—	Nevermore (unreleased)
2010	"Found Someone"	—	—	Nevermore (unreleased)
2012	"Colors Turn to Grey"	—	—	Songs from a Blackbird
2013	"The Minute"	—	—	Songs from a Blackbird
2013	"Driving"	—	—	Songs from a Blackbird
2014	"In Dreams"	—	—	Scandal, Vol.1
2014	"You'll Get Up Again"	—	—	Scandal, Vol.1
2015	"Better Than This"	—	—	Scandal, Vol.2
2015	"Kicks In"	—	—	Scandal, Vol.2
2019	"Tyv"	—	—	Mellom Disse 4 Vegger

=== Other appearances ===
Year	Single	Peak positions				Album
Year	Single	NOR	AUT	NED	SWI	Album
2006	"It's All Coming Back to Me Now" (with Meat Loaf)	1	17	15	21	Bat Out of Hell III: The Monster Is Loose
