= Heads Will Roll (EP) =

Heads Will Roll EP

EP by Marion Raven
- Released: 2006 (United States) October 31
- Recorded: 21:05
- Genre: Alternative rock, post-grunge
- Label: Eleven Seven Records
- Producer: Desmond Child, James Michael

Marion Raven chronology
Here I Am (2005)	Heads Will Roll EP (2006)	Set Me Free (2007)

Heads Will Roll EP is the first EP by Marion Raven, released on October 31, 2006. All of the songs were written by Raven in collaboration with numerous artists including Nikki Sixx (Mötley Crüe), Scott Stevens and Freddy Herrera (The Exies), Keith Nelson and Xavier Muriel (Buckcherry), and Raine Maida (Our Lady Peace). The EP was made available for downloading from iTunes while the hard copy was exclusively released in the US. In Raven's own words, the tracks on the EP are fun rock songs that are meant for jumping around to.

The EP's title track, "Heads Will Roll", is a re-recorded version of the same track that was previously released in Raven's 2005 internationally released album, Here I Am. The new version, produced and mixed by James Michael, removes various sound effects used to muffle Raven's voice and has Scott Stevens providing backup vocals. "Heads Will Roll" is the result of Raven's writing collaboration with Nikki Sixx and James Michael. In an interview with Exclusive Magazine, Raven's meeting with Nikki Sixx was the result of being able to acquire backstage tickets for Alice Cooper's concert in Oslo, Norway, in which Sixx was a supporting act. Sixx invited Raven to head to L.A. to work on tracks for her album, including "Heads Will Roll".

The song was inspired by Sixx's bass line, which can be heard in many parts of the track, as well as Raven's original idea for a song titled "Heads to the Wall". "Heads Will Roll" and the other 5 tracks prominently marks Raven's shift from the teen-pop songs of M2M (band) to a harder rocking, more mature effort. The song was featured on the "Van Wilder 2: Rise of the Taj" movie soundtrack.

The “Heads Will Roll” video, which features scenes of a half-naked Raven on top of ten naked women crammed into a futuristic box, also features Xavier Muriel from Buckcherry playing drums and Scott Stevens’s backing vocals and playing the electric guitar and Freddy Herrera on bass, both from The Exies.

If you want to be a real rock 'n' roller you want to be sexy. Guys in rock 'n' roll bands are sexy, so why shouldn’t the girls be? Just because a girl can sing and rock, she doesn’t need to have a short haircut and wear a turtleneck.

Raven said on the music video and on being a female rocker. The video caused controversy as it featured exposed breasts. A censored version of the video, without nudity was made available for daytime airplay on music video channels.

== Music video personnel and details ==
Director: Charles Jensen
Producer(s): Kevin Muir/Elyciphus Siler
Editor: Charles Jensen
Director of photography: Peter Richardson/Jason Wawro
Artist name: Marion Raven
Label: 10th Street Entertainment
Total Running time: 3:17

== Track listing ==
Main track
No.	Title	Writer(s)	Length
1.	"Spit You Out"	Marion Raven, DJ Ashba	4:37
2.	"Heads Will Roll"	Marion Raven, Nikki Sixx, James Michael	3:18
3.	"All I Wanna Do Is You"	Marion Raven, Keith Nelson	3:09
4.	"13 Days"	Marion Raven, Chantal Kreviazuk, Raine Maida	3:07
5.	"Good 4 Sex"	Marion Raven, Desmond Child	3:41
6.	"Let Me Introduce Myself" (Acoustic)	Marion Raven	3:15

== Reception ==
Professional ratings
Review scores
Source	Rating
IGN	(7.2/10)
Allmusic	2/5 stars

Reviews of the EP were generally positive, with IGN stating, "Calling Raven's vocals 'pop' is not a slam, as she has a strong enough voice to make her worthy of some attention." Sixx also praised Raven, he said, "I’ve written with artists as diverse as Josey from Saliva(band) to Meat Loaf and Vince Neil, but Marion is the most talented new artist I’ve worked with since I’ve been making music."

== Tracks ==
"Let Me Introduce Myself", is a song meant for Raven's ex-boyfriend's new girlfriend. It has three versions, the band version and two acoustic versions, band version is included in her debut album Here I Am, the second version is featured in her first EP Heads Will Roll and contains some explicit lyrics, and the second and censored acoustic version appears in the album Set Me Free as a hidden track that comes after "All I Wanna Do Is You". The acoustic version also features an intro to the song. Raven was quoted as stating that the band version did not capture the essence of what the song is about.
