= List of UK Rock & Metal Albums Chart number ones of 2003 =

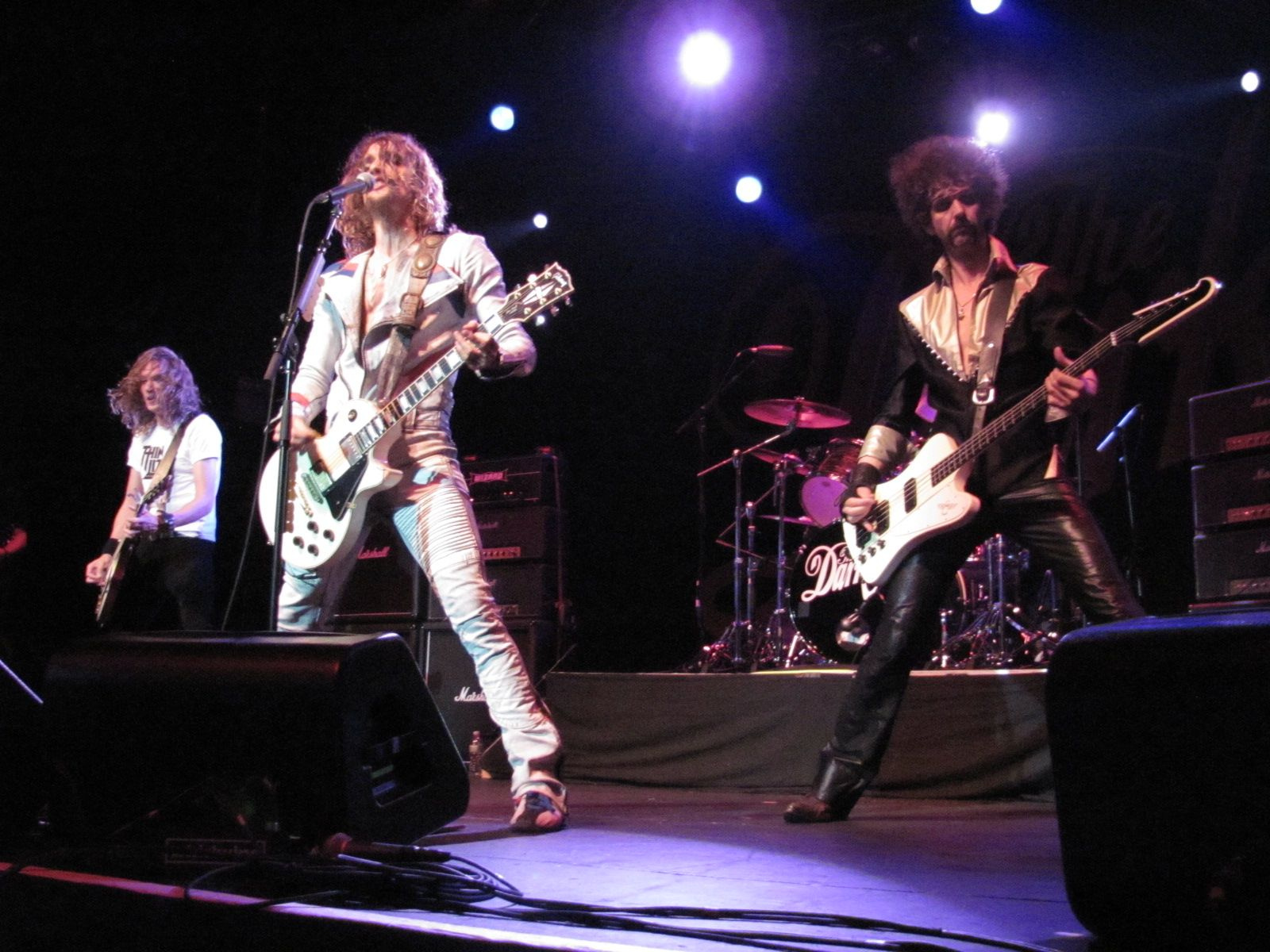
Permission to Land by The Darkness was the longest-running UK Rock & Metal Albums Chart Number One Album of 2003, spending 18 weeks atop the chart.

The UK Rock & Metal Albums Chart is a record chart that ranks the best-selling rock and heavy metal albums in the United Kingdom. Compiled and published by the Official Charts Company, the data is based on each album's weekly physical sales, digital downloads and streams. In 2003, there were 17 albums that topped the 52 published charts. The first number-one album of the year was By the Way, the eighth studio album by Red Hot Chili Peppers, which remained at Number One for the first three weeks of the year at the end of a nine-week run which began on 23 November 2002. The final Number One album of the year was Permission to Land, the debut studio album by The Darkness, which spent the last four weeks of the year (and the first week of 2004) at Number One in its fourth spell of the year, at the top of the chart.

The most successful album on the UK Rock & Metal Albums Chart in 2003 was Permission to Land, which spent a total of 18 weeks at Number One over five spells, including a run of eight consecutive weeks between the week ending 9 August and the week ending 27 September. Permission to Land was the best-selling rock and metal album of the year, ranking sixth in the UK End of Year Albums Chart. By the Way spent nine weeks at Number One in 2003, and was the 18th best-selling album of the year. Evanescence's debut studio album Fallen was Number One on the chart for five weeks in 2003, Linkin Park's second studio album Meteora spent four weeks at number one, and three albums – One by One by Foo Fighters, Radiohead's Hail to the Thief and Room on Fire by The Strokes – were Number One for two weeks each during 2003.

== Chart history ==
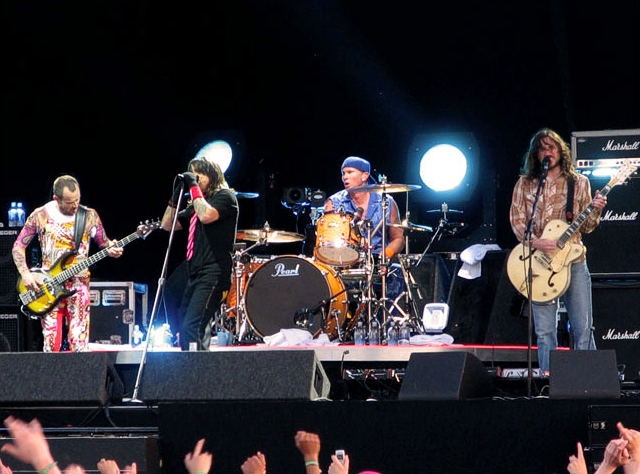
By the Way by Red Hot Chili Peppers spent nine weeks at Number One in 2003 and ranked as the 18th best-selling album of the year in the UK.

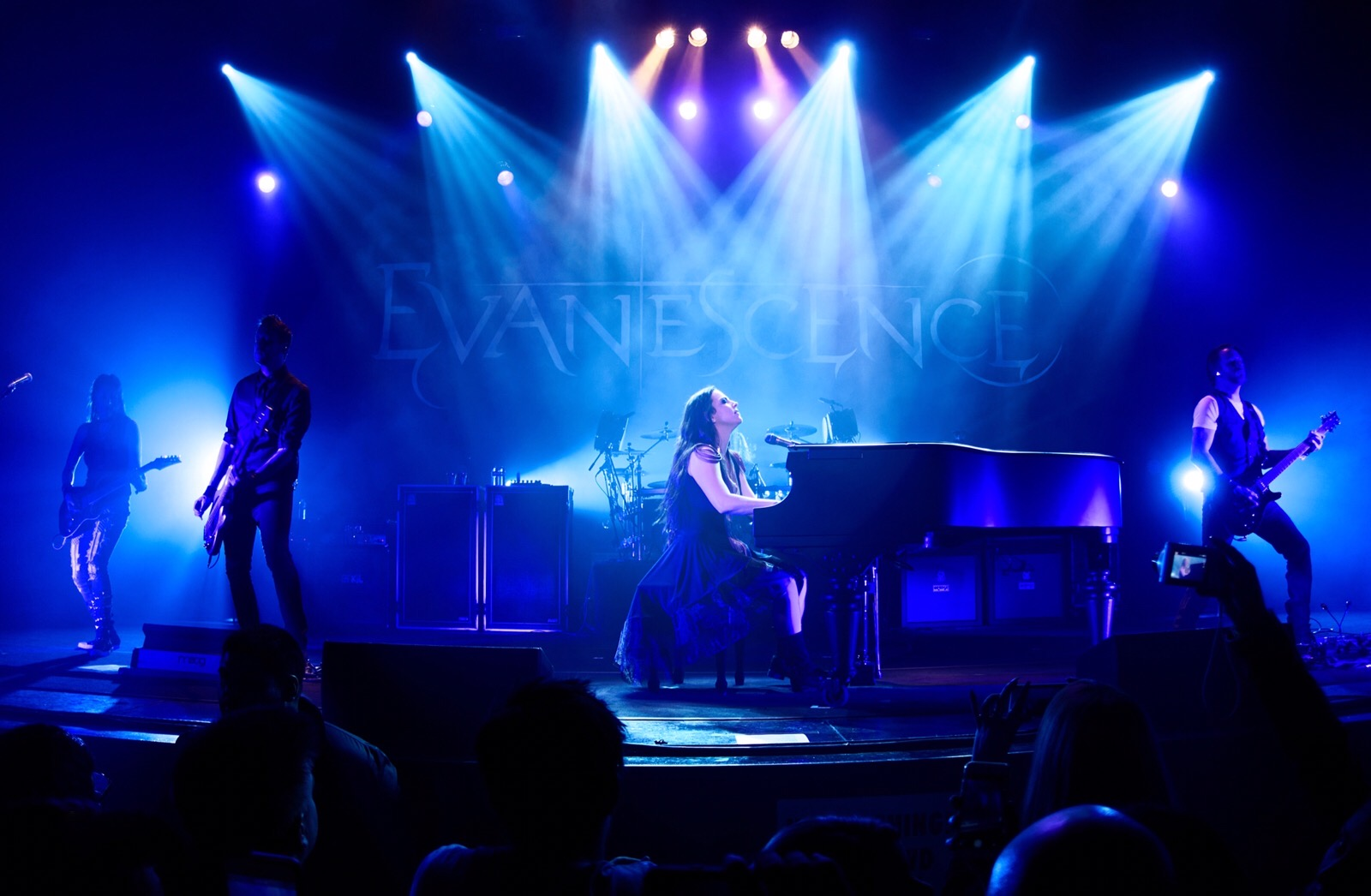
Evanescence's debut studio album Fallen was Number One in 2003 for five weeks over three different spells.

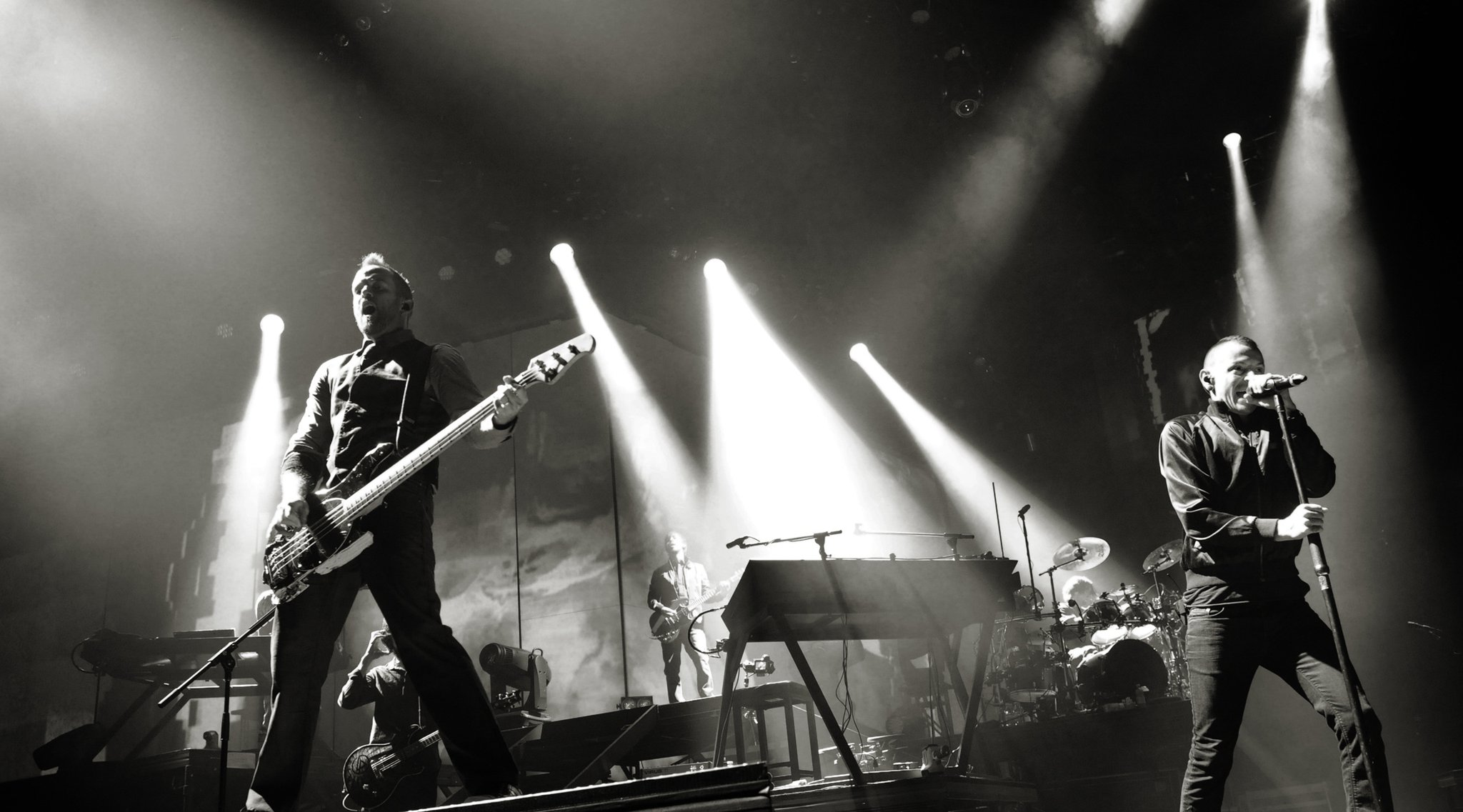
Linkin Park's second studio album Meteora spent four consecutive weeks in April 2003 at number one.

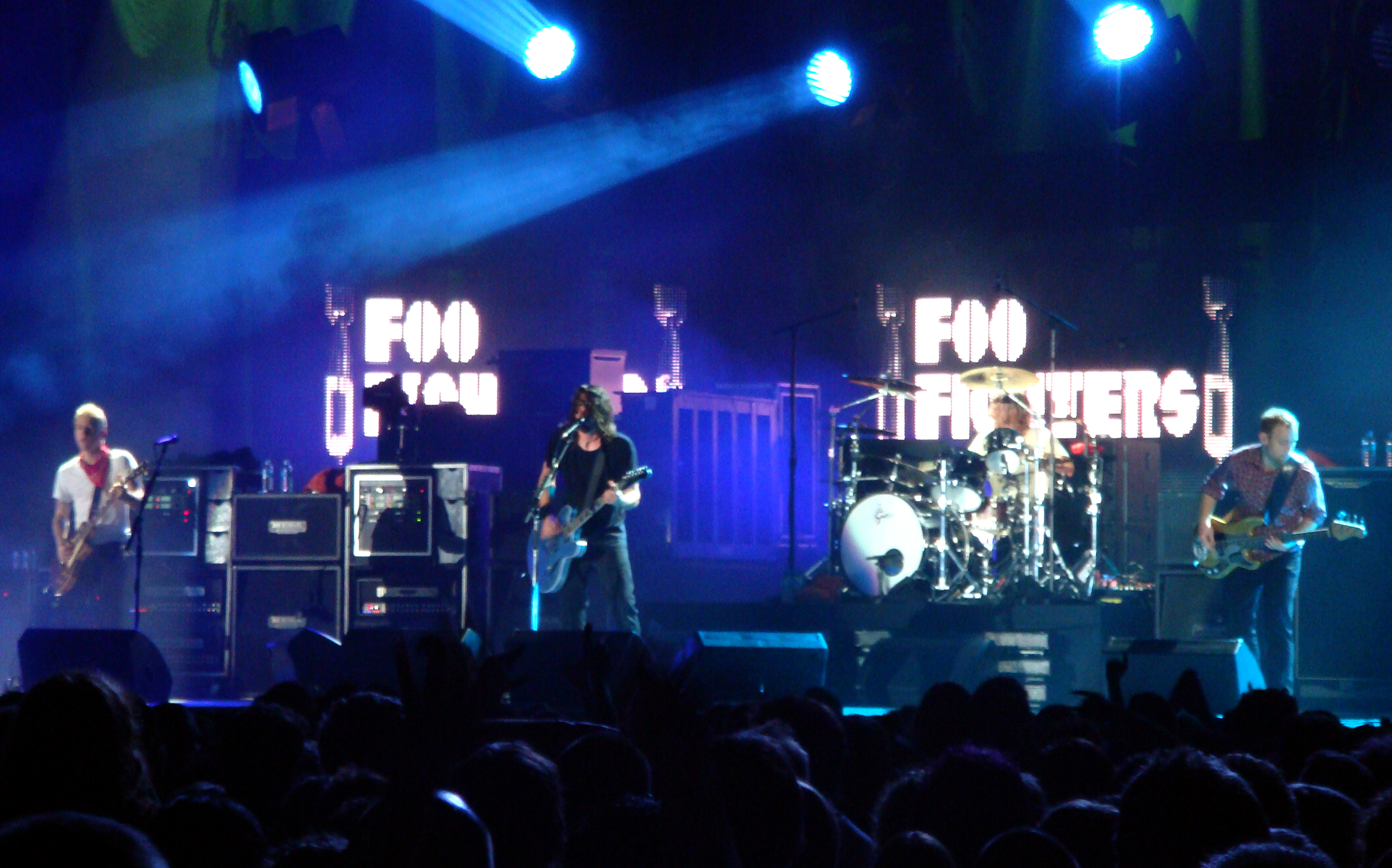
Foo Fighters spent two weeks at Number One in 2003 with their fourth studio album One by One.

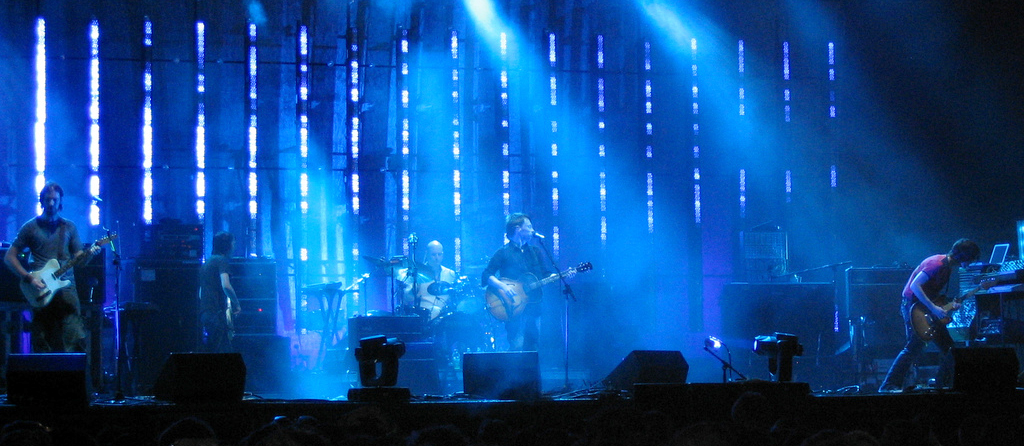
Hail to the Thief, the sixth studio album by Radiohead, was Number One on the chart for two weeks in 2003.

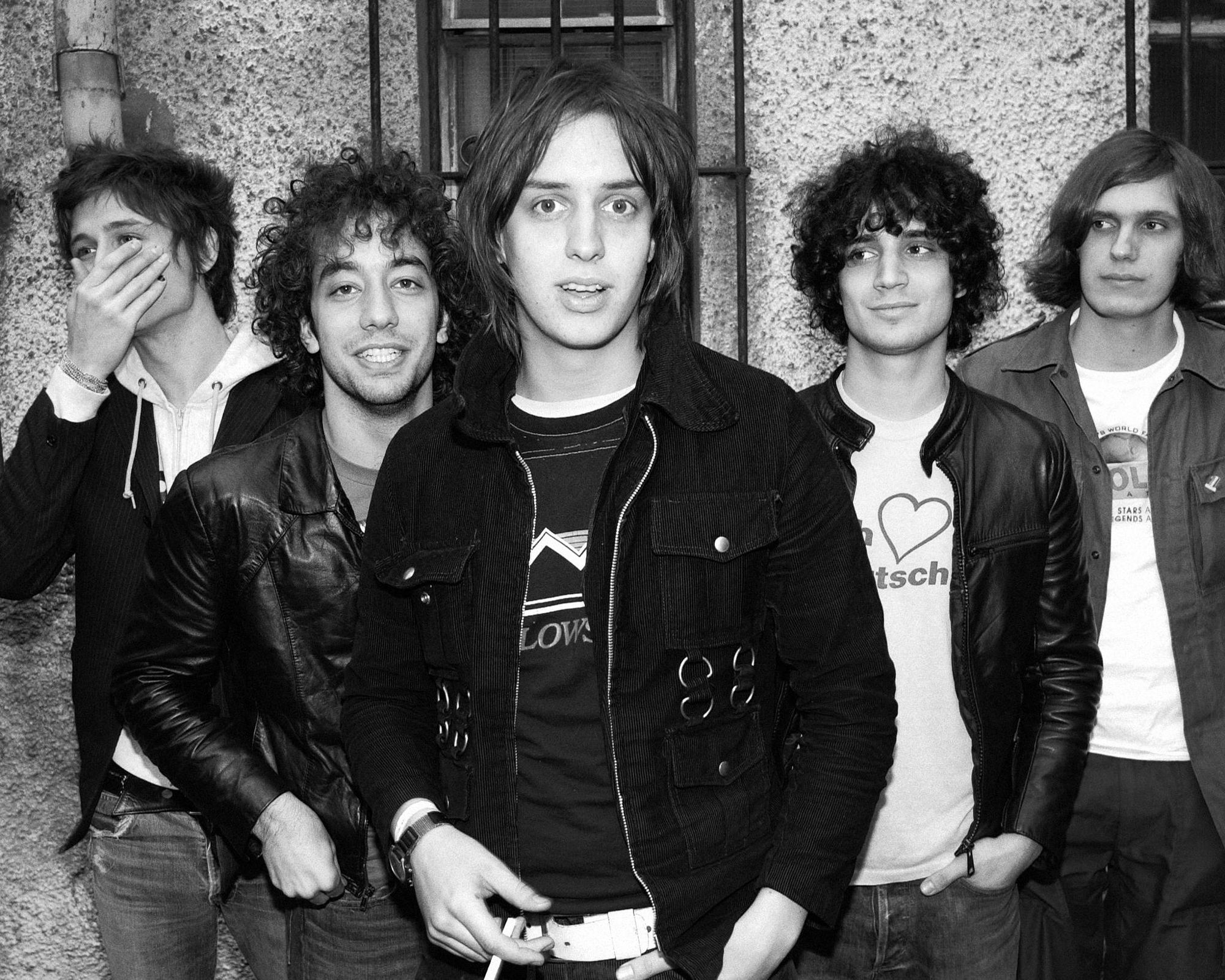
The Strokes registered their only Number One on the UK Rock & Metal Albums Chart in 2003 with the band's second studio album Room on Fire.

Key
†	Indicates best-selling rock album of 2003

Issue date	Album	Artist(s)	Record label(s)	Ref.
4 January	By the Way	Red Hot Chili Peppers	Warner Bros.	
11 January	By the Way	Red Hot Chili Peppers	Warner Bros.	
18 January	By the Way	Red Hot Chili Peppers	Warner Bros.	
25 January	One by One	Foo Fighters	RCA	
1 February	One by One	Foo Fighters	RCA	
8 February	Overgrown Eden	InMe	Music for Nations	
15 February	The Neon Handshake	Hell Is for Heroes	EMI	
22 February	By the Way	Red Hot Chili Peppers	Warner Bros.	
1 March	By the Way	Red Hot Chili Peppers	Warner Bros.	
8 March	By the Way	Red Hot Chili Peppers	Warner Bros.	
15 March	By the Way	Red Hot Chili Peppers	Warner Bros.	
22 March	By the Way	Red Hot Chili Peppers	Warner Bros.	
29 March	By the Way	Red Hot Chili Peppers	Warner Bros.	
5 April	Meteora	Linkin Park	Warner Bros.	
12 April	Meteora	Linkin Park	Warner Bros.	
19 April	Meteora	Linkin Park	Warner Bros.	
26 April	Meteora	Linkin Park	Warner Bros.	
3 May	Couldn't Have Said It Better	Meat Loaf	Mercury	
10 May	Fallen	Evanescence	Epic	
17 May	Fallen	Evanescence	Epic	
24 May	The Golden Age of Grotesque	Marilyn Manson	Interscope	
31 May	Deftones	Deftones	Maverick	
7 June	Fallen	Evanescence	Epic	
14 June	St. Anger	Metallica	Vertigo	
21 June	Hail to the Thief	Radiohead	Parlophone	
28 June	Hail to the Thief	Radiohead	Parlophone	
5 July	Fallen	Evanescence	Epic	
12 July	Fallen	Evanescence	Epic	
19 July	Permission to Land †	The Darkness	Must Destroy	
26 July	Permission to Land †	The Darkness	Must Destroy	
2 August	Strays	Jane's Addiction	Parlophone	
9 August	Permission to Land †	The Darkness	Must Destroy	
16 August	Permission to Land †	The Darkness	Must Destroy	
23 August	Permission to Land †	The Darkness	Must Destroy	
30 August	Permission to Land †	The Darkness	Must Destroy	
6 September	Permission to Land †	The Darkness	Must Destroy	
13 September	Permission to Land †	The Darkness	Must Destroy	
20 September	Permission to Land †	The Darkness	Must Destroy	
27 September	Permission to Land †	The Darkness	Must Destroy	
4 October	Absolution	Muse	East West	
11 October	Permission to Land †	The Darkness	Must Destroy	
18 October	Permission to Land †	The Darkness	Must Destroy	
25 October	Permission to Land †	The Darkness	Must Destroy	
1 November	Room on Fire	The Strokes	Rough Trade	
8 November	Room on Fire	The Strokes	Rough Trade	
15 November	This Left Feels Right	Bon Jovi	Mercury	
22 November	Permission to Land †	The Darkness	Must Destroy	
29 November	Blink-182	Blink-182	Geffen	
6 December	Permission to Land †	The Darkness	Must Destroy	
13 December	Permission to Land †	The Darkness	Must Destroy	
20 December	Permission to Land †	The Darkness	Must Destroy	
27 December	Permission to Land †	The Darkness	Must Destroy	

== See also ==
- 2003 in British music
- List of UK Rock & Metal Singles Chart number ones of 2003
