= Couldn't Have Said It Better =

Studio album by Meat Loaf
- Released: April 21, 2003
- Recorded: 2001–03
- Genre: Rock; hard rock
- Length: 55:23
- Label: Mercury; Sanctuary
- Producer: Tony Flores; James Michael; Peter Mokran

Meat Loaf chronology
Welcome to the Neighbourhood (1995)	Couldn't Have Said It Better (2003)	Bat Out of Hell III: The Monster Is Loose (2006)

Singles from Couldn't Have Said It Better
- 1. "Did I Say That?" Released: 2003; 2. "Couldn't Have Said It Better" Released: 2003; 3. "Man of Steel" Released: November 22, 2003

Professional ratings
Review scores
Source	Rating
AllMusic	3/5 stars
The Rolling Stone Album Guide	2/5 stars

Couldn't Have Said It Better is the eighth studio album by Meat Loaf, released in the UK on April 21, 2003. For only the third time in his career, he released an album without any songs written by Jim Steinman (not counting the bonus tracks). Meat Loaf claimed that Couldn't Have Said It Better was "the most perfect album [he] did since Bat Out of Hell".

Three singles were released: "Did I Say That?", "Couldn't Have Said It Better" and "Man of Steel", all with little chart impact. The album was recorded for Universal Music Germany's Polydor division and was licensed to Mercury Records for its UK release and Sanctuary Records for US release, while global distribution was handled by parent company Universal Music Group. Most of this was caused by lack of promotion on behalf of Sanctuary, the company that released the album in the US, and few actual singles being distributed, especially in the UK—his biggest market. The single "Couldn't Have Said It Better" featuring Patti Russo was #1 on the UK Rock & Metal Singles Chart in 2003 and reached the AC Top 40 in the US, while the videos also had low budgets, in stark contrast to his 1990s videos.

However, the album was a minor success worldwide and reached number 4 on the UK Albums Chart. There were many writers for the album including Diane Warren and James Michael. Warren has written for Meat Loaf in the past and had some very big hits. Michael had never written for Meat Loaf before and it was only his songs that were released as singles from the album.

Several versions of the album have been released, some with bonus-material. Also, the color of the album cover is different in the UK (blue) from the other territories (red).

== Tour ==
The album was accompanied by a sold-out world tour which was used to promote the album and some of Meat Loaf's biggest hits. On November 17, 2003, during a performance at London's Wembley Arena, he collapsed with what was later diagnosed as Wolff-Parkinson-White syndrome. The following week, he underwent a surgical procedure intended to correct the problem. As a result, Meat Loaf's insurance agency did not allow him to perform for any longer than one hour and 45 minutes.

Meat Loaf finished his tour and came back two years later for his Hair of the Dog That Bit You world tour, which was a sellout for over 160 concerts. As well as singing all the classics, he sang a cover version of the hit single "Black Betty". During this tour, Meat Loaf also sang one of the songs from his upcoming album Bat Out of Hell III called "Only When I Feel". He mentioned that it was not one of the most critical songs on the album, and it has since been removed from that album's track listing. Meat Loaf said that this could be his last 'world' tour, and when he came to promote Bat Out of Hell III, he would be doing less than a fifth of the concerts he did on this tour. "Only When I Feel" has instead been added to the 2016 album "Braver Than We Are".

== Track listing ==
No.	Title	Writer(s)	Length
1.	"Couldn't Have Said It Better" (Duet with Patti Russo)	James Michael; Nikki Sixx	7:07
2.	"Did I Say That?"	Michael	6:02
3.	"Why Isn't That Enough?"	Jo Davidson	4:07
4.	"Love You Out Loud"	Michael; Sixx	4:10
5.	"Man of Steel"	Michael; Sixx	4:44
6.	"Intermezzo" (instrumental)	Peter Mokran	1:28
7.	"Testify"	Kevin Griffin	4:56
8.	"Tear Me Down"	Stephen Trask	3:37
9.	"You're Right, I Was Wrong"	Diane Warren	3:44
10.	"Because of You"	Steve Balsamo; Rick Jude	3:54
11.	"Do It!"	Billy Rankin	2:36
12.	"Forever Young"	Bob Dylan	5:05
13.	"Mercury Blues" (Hidden track)	K. C. Douglas; Robert L. Geddins	3:48
14.	"Bat Out of Hell" (live bonus track, UK edition only from VH1: Storytellers)	Jim Steinman	11:17

=== Australian edition bonus live disc ===
The Australian release of Couldn't Have Said It Better included a live bonus disc, compiled by Meat Loaf, including 6 live tracks from the American leg of the 2003 world tour.

1. "Life Is a Lemon and I Want My Money Back" (Jim Steinman) – 6:47
2. "Tear Me Down" (Trask) – 4:00
3. "Love You Out Loud" (Michael/Sixx) – 4:34
4. "I'd Do Anything for Love (But I Won't Do That)" (Steinman) – 10:32
5. "Couldn't Have Said It Better" (Michael, Sixx) – 8:18
6. "Bat Out of Hell" (Steinman) – 11:47

=== Special edition bonus CD ===
The special editions of the UK and international releases included a bonus disc containing two video clips and an MP3 file from Meat Loaf's 1999 VH1 Storytellers DVD and CD, and the promotional video for "Did I Say That?".

1. "I'd Do Anything for Love" (video from Meat Loaf Storytellers DVD) (Steinman) – 8:04
2. "A Kiss Is a Terrible Thing to Waste" (video from Meat Loaf Storytellers DVD) (Andrew Lloyd Webber, Steinman) – 5:24
3. "Did I Say That?" (video) (Michael) – 4:46
4. "Two Out of Three Ain't Bad" (Meat Loaf VH1 Storytellers DVD, MP3 file) (Steinman) – 4:47

== Personnel ==
Track numbers indicate that a musician only plays the instrument so noted on that specific track.

=== Arrangements ===
- Todd Rundgren – vocal arranger (1)
- Aaron Zigman – orchestral arranger (1, 2, 5, 8, 11)

=== Band ===
- Meat Loaf – vocals

==== The Neverland Express ====
- Kasim Sulton – bass guitar, backing vocals
- Tom Brislin – piano (2–8), Hammond B3 (2, 6, 7)
- John Miceli – drums (9, 11, 12, 13)
- Patti Russo – female lead vocals (1), backing vocals (11, 12, 13)
- Pearl Aday – female lead vocals (5), backing vocals (7)

==== Regular Meat Loaf studio sidemen ====
- Tim Pierce – guitar (1)
- Mark Alexander – piano (9, 12), Hammond B3 (1)
- Kenny Aronoff – drums
- Todd Rundgren – backing vocals (1)
- Eric Troyer – backing vocals

==== Studio musicians ====
- Michael Thompson – guitar
- Peter Mokran – guitar (12), synthesizer, programming
- Aaron Zigman – piano (1, 11)
- Dan Higgins – penny whistle ("Intermezzo")
- Stephen Erdody – cello (12)
- Luis Conte – percussion (3)
- Tanja Reichert – spoken intro (5)
- Giselda Vatcky – spoken breakdown (7)
- James Michael – backing vocals (1, 2, 5)
- Maxi Anderson, Alexandra Brown, Lynn Davis, Rose Stone – backing vocals (3, 5, 6)

=== Australian edition bonus live disc ===
Musical director/producer: Kasim Sulton

- Meat Loaf – vocals, guitar
- Patti Russo – female lead and backing vocals
- Paul Crook – lead guitars
- Randy Flowers – guitars, keyboards, backing vocals
- Kasim Sulton – bass guitar, backing vocals
- Mark Alexander – keyboards, backing vocals
- John Miceli – drums
- Renee Cologne – backing vocals

== Charts ==
Chart (2003)	Peak position
Australian Albums (ARIA)	28
Austrian Albums (Ö3 Austria)	58
Danish Albums (Hitlisten)	5
Dutch Albums (Album Top 100)	36
German Albums (Offizielle Top 100)	8
Irish Albums (IRMA)	16
New Zealand Albums (RMNZ)	17
Scottish Albums (OCC)	4
Swedish Albums (Sverigetopplistan)	26
Swiss Albums (Schweizer Hitparade)	44
UK Albums (OCC)	4
US Billboard 200	85
