= Couldn't Have Said It Better (song) =

2003 single by Meat Loaf

Single by Meat Loaf

from the album Couldn't Have Said It Better
- Released: April 14, 2003
- Length: 7:08
- Label: Sanctuary; Universal
- Songwriters: James Michael, Nikki Sixx
- Producer: Peter Mokran

Meat Loaf singles chronology
"Did I Say That?" (2003)	"Couldn't Have Said It Better" (2003)	"Man of Steel" (2003)

"Couldn't Have Said It Better" is a song written by James Michael and Nikki Sixx and performed by American singer and actor Meat Loaf and Patti Russo. It was released as a single in April 2003 and was #1 on the UK Rock & Metal Singles Chart.

== Background ==
James Michael (Sixx:A.M.) wrote the lyrics to this song while Nikki Sixx (Mötley Crüe, Sixx:A.M.) wrote the music. The song is featured on Meat Loaf's 2003 album of the same name. Meat Loaf and Patti Russo performed this song nightly on the Couldn't Have Said It Better World Tour in 2003 and 2004. The music video for the song was released in April 2003 and featured Meat Loaf and Patti Russo singing on a soundstage.

This song is also featured on Meat Loaf's video Bat Out of Hell: Live with the Melbourne Symphony Orchestra.

== Charts ==
Chart (2003)	Peak position
Europe (Eurochart Hot 100)	82
Germany (GfK)	80
Netherlands (Single Top 100)	43
Scottish Singles Sales (Official Charts)	31
UK Singles (Official Charts)	31
US Adult Pop Airplay (Billboard)	36
UK Rock & Metal (Official Charts)	1

== Release history ==
Region	Date	Format(s)	Label(s)	Ref.
United Kingdom	April 14, 2003	CD	Universal	
Australia	April 21, 2003	CD	Universal	
United States	September 8, 2003	Adult contemporary; hot adult contemporary; mainstream rock radio	Sanctuary	
