= List of UK Rock & Metal Singles Chart number ones of 2003 =

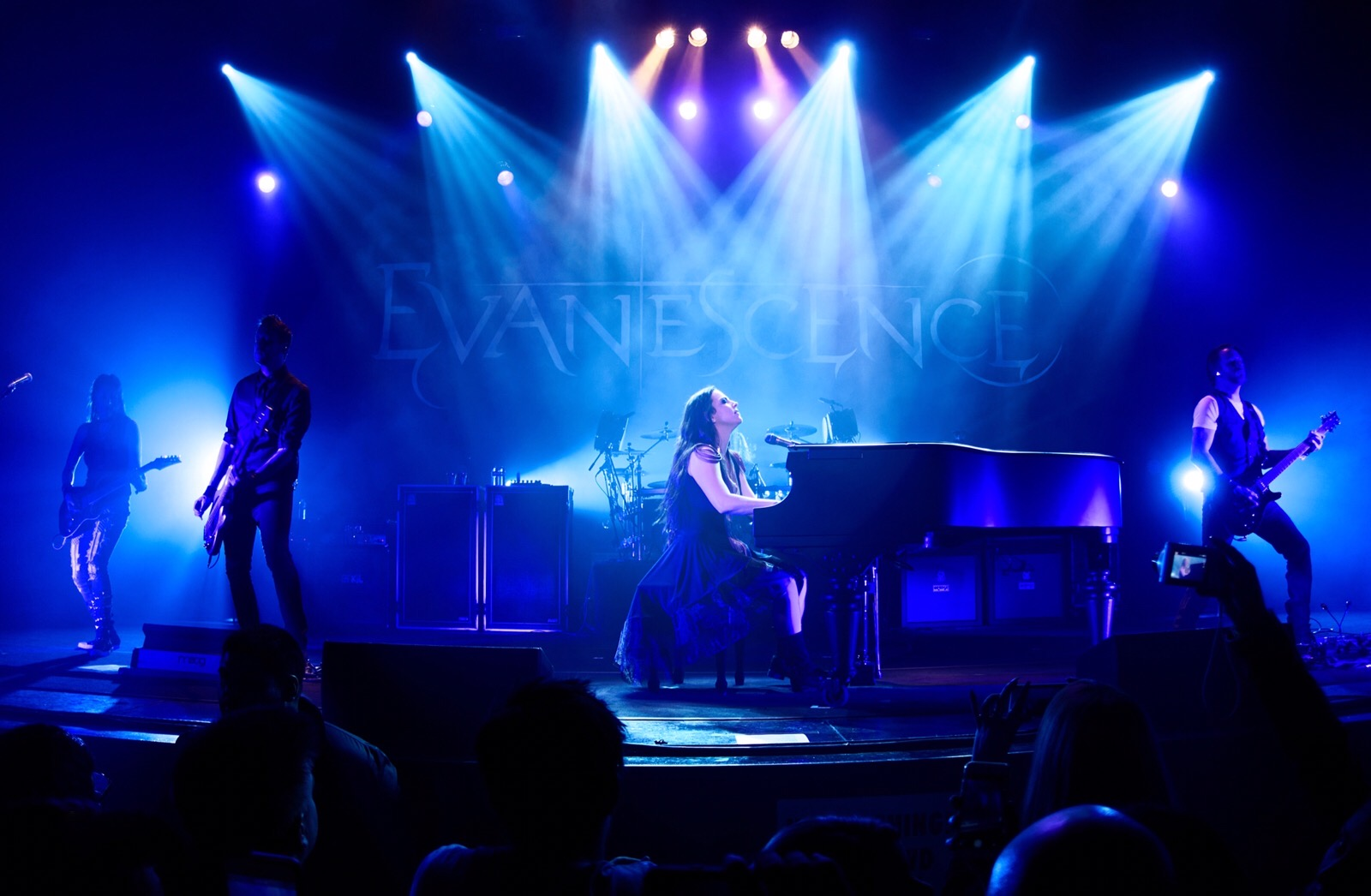
"Bring Me to Life" by Evanescence was the longest-running number-one single of 2003, spending ten weeks at number one. The band also reached number one for a single week with "My Immortal".

The UK Rock & Metal Singles Chart is a record chart which ranks the best-selling rock and heavy metal songs in the United Kingdom. Compiled and published by the Official Charts Company, the data is based on each track's weekly physical sales, digital downloads and streams. In 2003, there were 23 singles that topped the 52 published charts. The first number-one single of the year was "Still Waiting" by American pop punk band Sum 41, which spent the first two weeks of the year atop the chart. The final number-one single of the year was "Christmas Time (Don't Let the Bells End)" by glam rock band The Darkness.

The most successful song on the UK Rock & Metal Singles Chart in 2003 was "Bring Me to Life" by Evanescence, which spent ten weeks at number one. The band also topped the chart with "My Immortal". Good Charlotte's "Lifestyles of the Rich and Famous" spent six weeks at number one, with the band also reaching number one with "Girls & Boys" (for three weeks) and "The Anthem" (for two weeks). "I Believe in a Thing Called Love" by The Darkness was number one for six weeks, while "Somewhere I Belong" by Linkin Park spent five weeks atop the chart. "Still Waiting" by Sum 41, "Times Like These" by Foo Fighters and "Fortune Faded" by Red Hot Chili Peppers were all number one for two weeks, while Iron Maiden and Muse spent two weeks at number one in 2003 with two releases each.

== Chart history ==
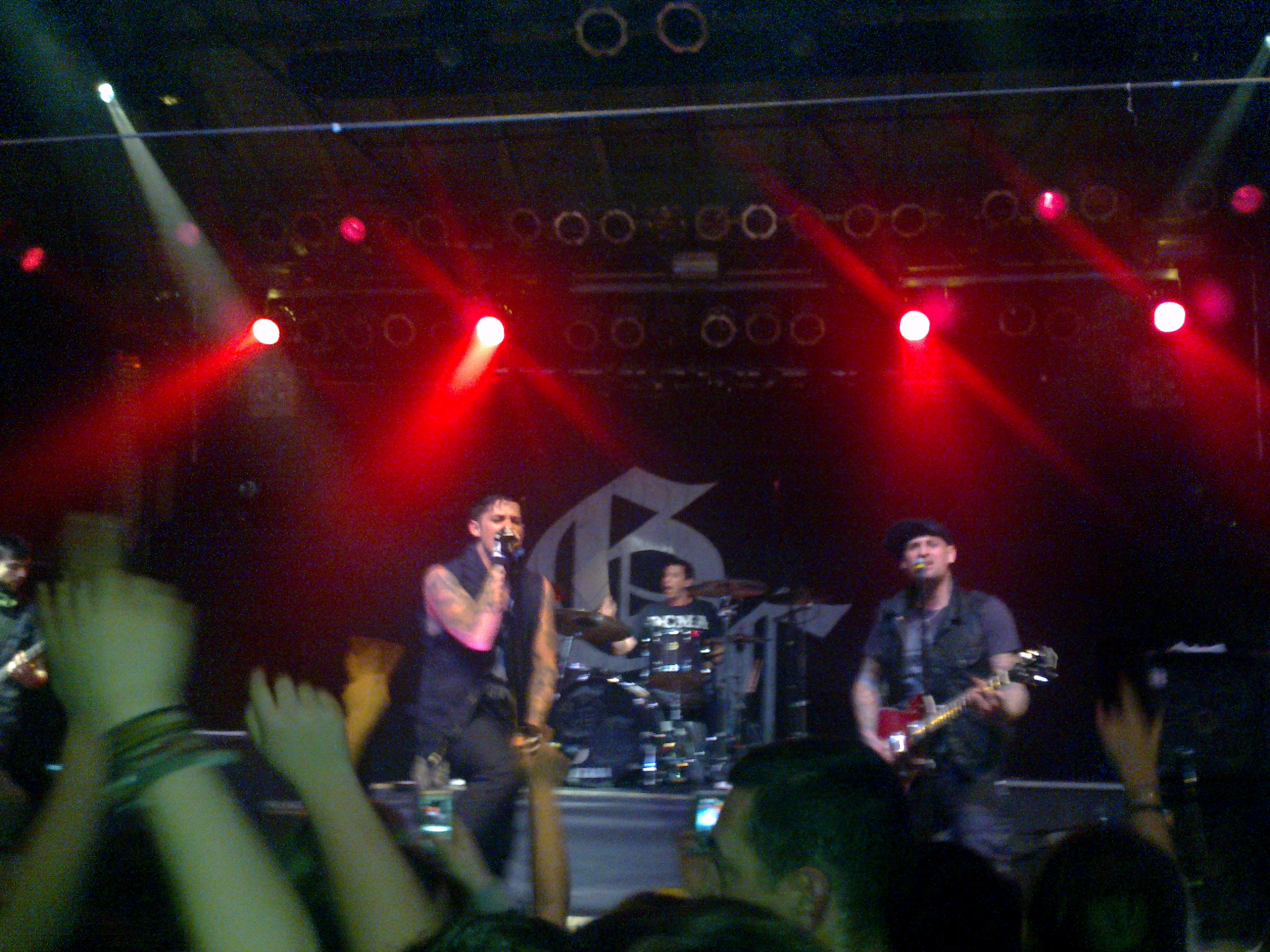
Good Charlotte spent eleven weeks at number one in 2003, with "Lifestyles of the Rich and Famous", "Girls & Boys" and "The Anthem" all topping the chart.

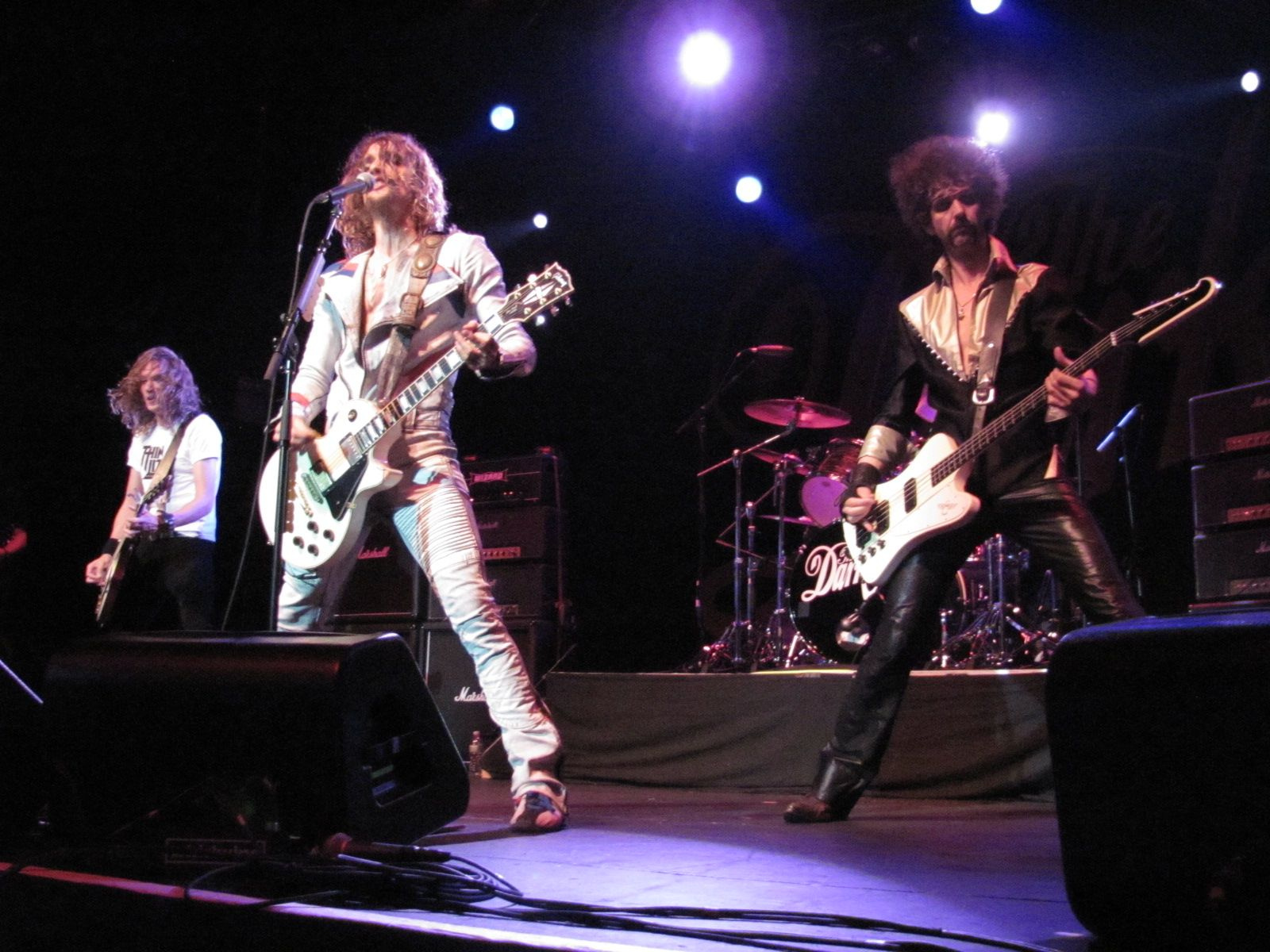
The Darkness reached number one with two singles in 2003: "I Believe in a Thing Called Love" and "Christmas Time (Don't Let the Bells End)".

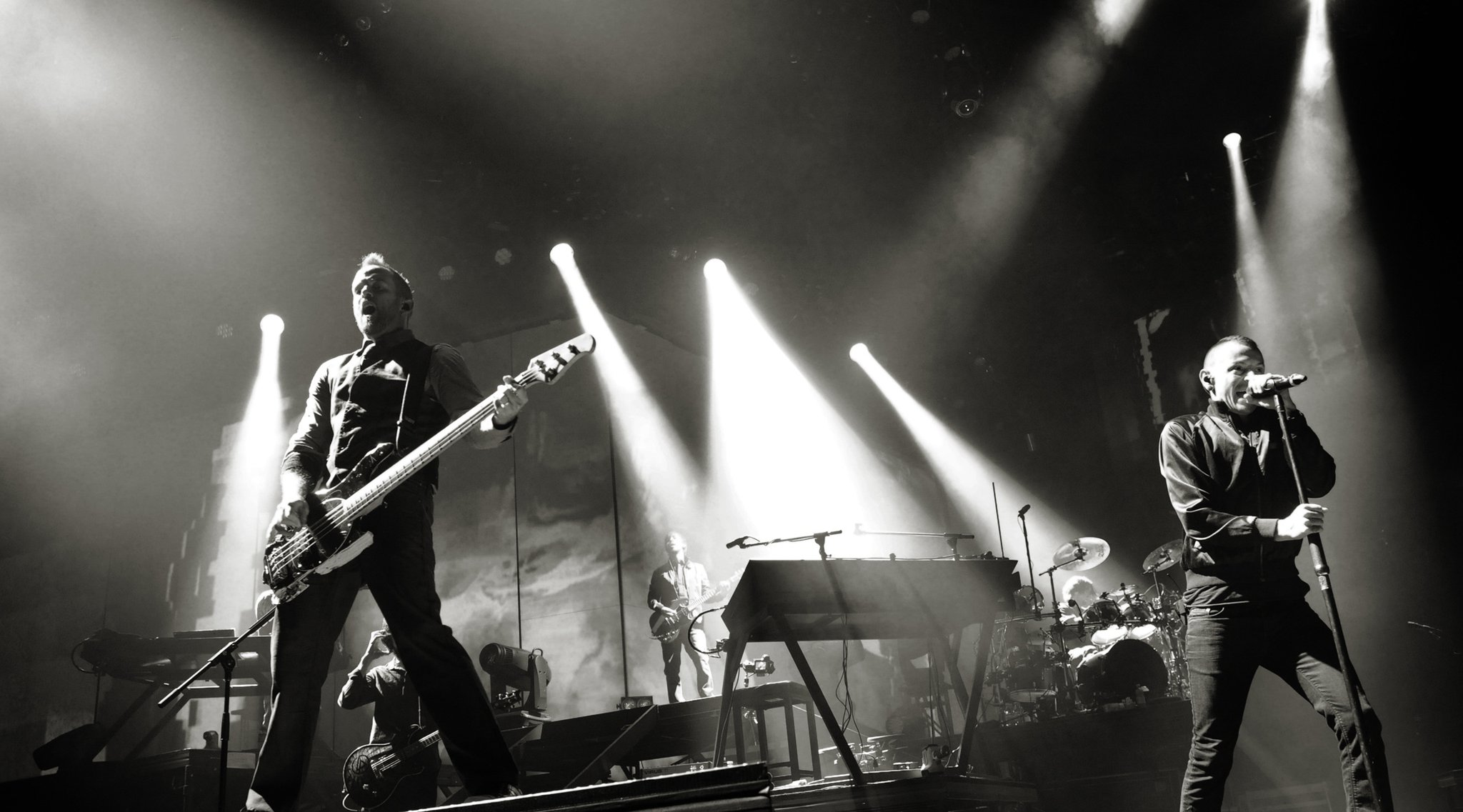
Linkin Park's "Somewhere I Belong" was number one for five weeks.

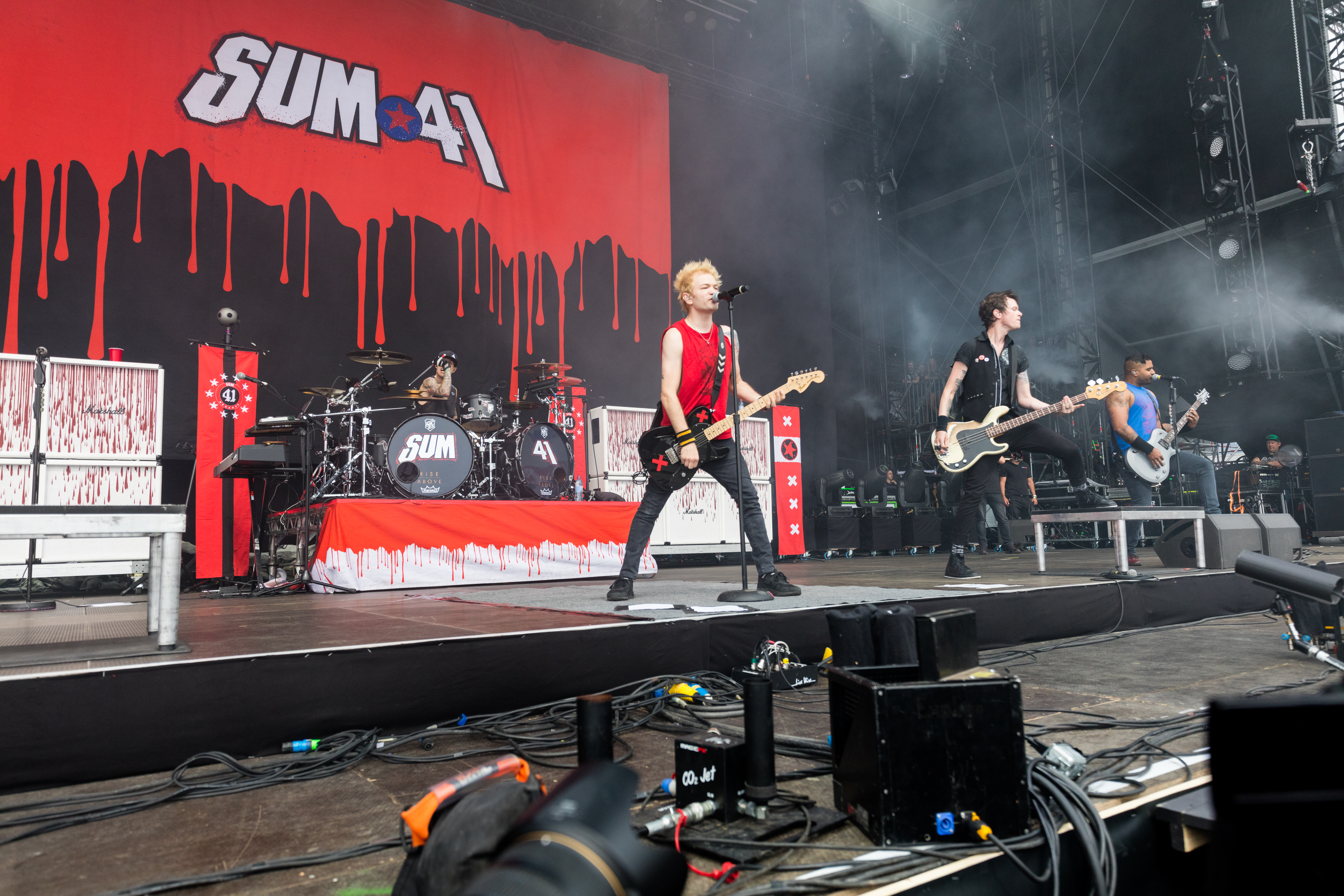
Sum 41's "Still Waiting" spent the first two weeks of the year at number one.

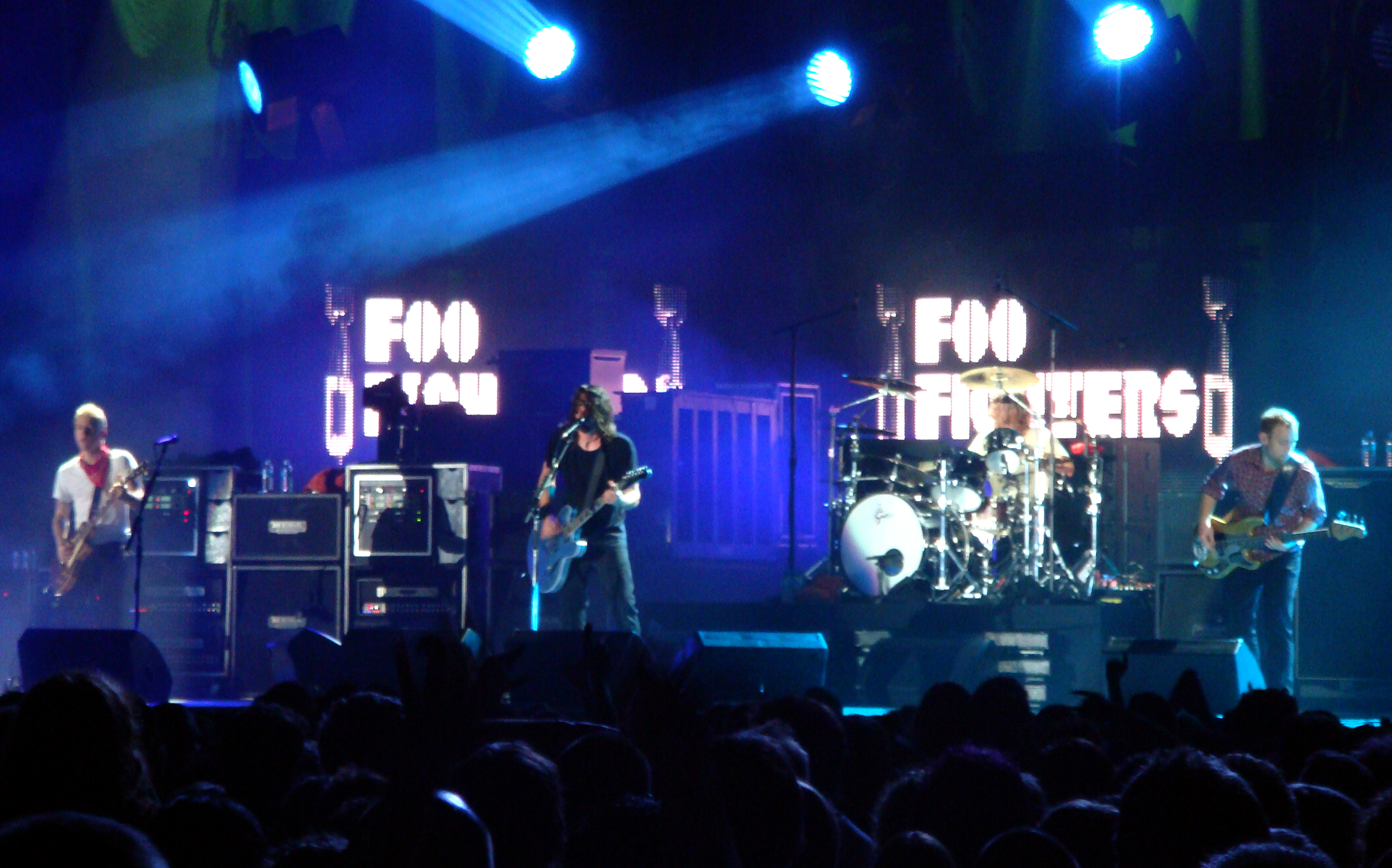
"Times Like These" by Foo Fighters was number one for two weeks.

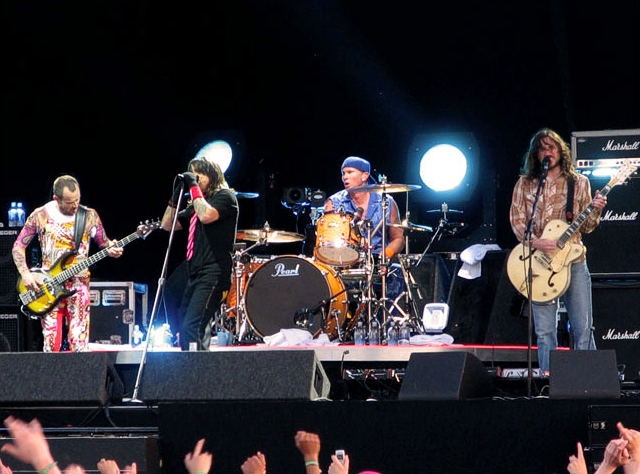
Red Hot Chili Peppers were number one for two weeks with "Fortune Faded".

Issue date	Single	Artist(s)	Record label(s)	Ref.
4 January	"Still Waiting"	Sum 41	Mercury	
11 January	"Still Waiting"	Sum 41	Mercury	
18 January	"Times Like These"	Foo Fighters	RCA	
25 January	"Times Like These"	Foo Fighters	RCA	
1 February	"Stormy in the North, Karma in the South"	The Wildhearts	Round	
8 February	"Shut Up"	Kelly Osbourne	Epic	
15 February	"Lifestyles of the Rich and Famous"	Good Charlotte	Epic	
22 February	"Lifestyles of the Rich and Famous"	Good Charlotte	Epic	
1 March	"Lifestyles of the Rich and Famous"	Good Charlotte	Epic	
8 March	"Lifestyles of the Rich and Famous"	Good Charlotte	Epic	
15 March	"Lifestyles of the Rich and Famous"	Good Charlotte	Epic	
22 March	"Lifestyles of the Rich and Famous"	Good Charlotte	Epic	
29 March	"Somewhere I Belong"	Linkin Park	Warner Bros.	
5 April	"Somewhere I Belong"	Linkin Park	Warner Bros.	
12 April	"Somewhere I Belong"	Linkin Park	Warner Bros.	
19 April	"Somewhere I Belong"	Linkin Park	Warner Bros.	
26 April	"Couldn't Have Said It Better"	Meat Loaf	Mercury	
3 May	"Somewhere I Belong"	Linkin Park	Warner Bros.	
10 May	"Girls & Boys"	Good Charlotte	Epic	
17 May	"Girls & Boys"	Good Charlotte	Epic	
24 May	"All About Lovin' You"	Bon Jovi	Mercury	
31 May	"Girls & Boys"	Good Charlotte	Epic	
7 June	"There There"	Radiohead	Parlophone	
14 June	"Bring Me to Life"	Evanescence	Epic	
21 June	"Bring Me to Life"	Evanescence	Epic	
28 June	"Bring Me to Life"	Evanescence	Epic	
5 July	"Bring Me to Life"	Evanescence	Epic	
12 July	"Bring Me to Life"	Evanescence	Epic	
19 July	"Bring Me to Life"	Evanescence	Epic	
26 July	"Bring Me to Life"	Evanescence	Epic	
2 August	"Bring Me to Life"	Evanescence	Epic	
9 August	"Bring Me to Life"	Evanescence	Epic	
16 August	"Bring Me to Life"	Evanescence	Epic	
23 August	"Did My Time"	Korn	Epic	
30 August	"The Anthem"	Good Charlotte	Epic	
6 September	"The Anthem"	Good Charlotte	Epic	
13 September	"Wildest Dreams"	Iron Maiden	EMI	
20 September	"Time Is Running Out"	Muse	East West	
27 September	"Someday"	Nickelback	Roadrunner	
4 October	"I Believe in a Thing Called Love"	The Darkness	Must Destroy	
11 October	"I Believe in a Thing Called Love"	The Darkness	Must Destroy	
18 October	"I Believe in a Thing Called Love"	The Darkness	Must Destroy	
25 October	"I Believe in a Thing Called Love"	The Darkness	Must Destroy	
1 November	"I Believe in a Thing Called Love"	The Darkness	Must Destroy	
8 November	"I Believe in a Thing Called Love"	The Darkness	Must Destroy	
15 November	"Burn Burn"	Lostprophets	Visible Noise	
22 November	"Fortune Faded"	Red Hot Chili Peppers	Warner Bros.	
29 November	"Fortune Faded"	Red Hot Chili Peppers	Warner Bros.	
6 December	"Rainmaker"	Iron Maiden	EMI	
13 December	"Hysteria"	Muse	East West	
20 December	"My Immortal"	Evanescence	Epic	
27 December	"Christmas Time (Don't Let the Bells End)"	The Darkness	Must Destroy	

== See also ==
- 2003 in British music
- List of UK Rock & Metal Albums Chart number ones of 2003
