= List of number-one singles from the 1990s (New Zealand) =

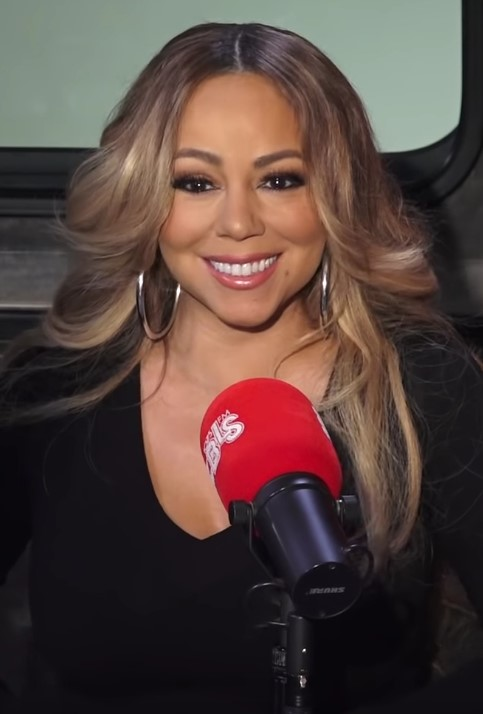
Mariah Carey had the most number-one singles—seven—in New Zealand during the 1990s: "Vision of Love", "I'll Be There", "Without You", "Endless Love", "Fantasy", "One Sweet Day", and "Heartbreaker".

The following lists the number one singles on the New Zealand Singles Chart during the 1990s. The source for this decade is the Recorded Music NZ chart, the chart history of which can be found on the Recorded Music NZ website or Charts.nz.

A total of 179 singles topped the chart in the 1990s, including 20 by New Zealand artists. Nine artists had three or more number-one singles; the most successful was Mariah Carey, who spent 20 weeks at number one with seven different singles; however, Michael Jackson spent 22 weeks at number one with six different singles. Boyz II Men reached number one four times, and those who peaked atop the chart three times were Boyzone, Blackstreet, Spice Girls, Janet Jackson, U2, and Deep Obsession—the New Zealand act with the most number-one singles during the decade.

Whitney Houston's cover of Dolly Parton's "I Will Always Love You" spent the most weeks at number one, claiming the number-one position for 14 weeks between December 1992 and March 1993 (this includes a three-week period in which no charts were published due to the Christmas and New Year holiday periods). "(I Can't Help) Falling in Love with You" by UB40 held the top position for 11 weeks, and the New Zealand act that spent the most weeks at number one during the 1990s was Push Push, who topped the listing for six weeks in 1991 with "Trippin'".

Key

* – Number-one single of the year (Note: Annual charts are sourced from the RIANZ website: "Annual Top 50 Singles Chart 2010")
† – Song of New Zealand origin (Note: Whether or not a song is of New Zealand origin is determined by the RMNZ)

== 1990 ==
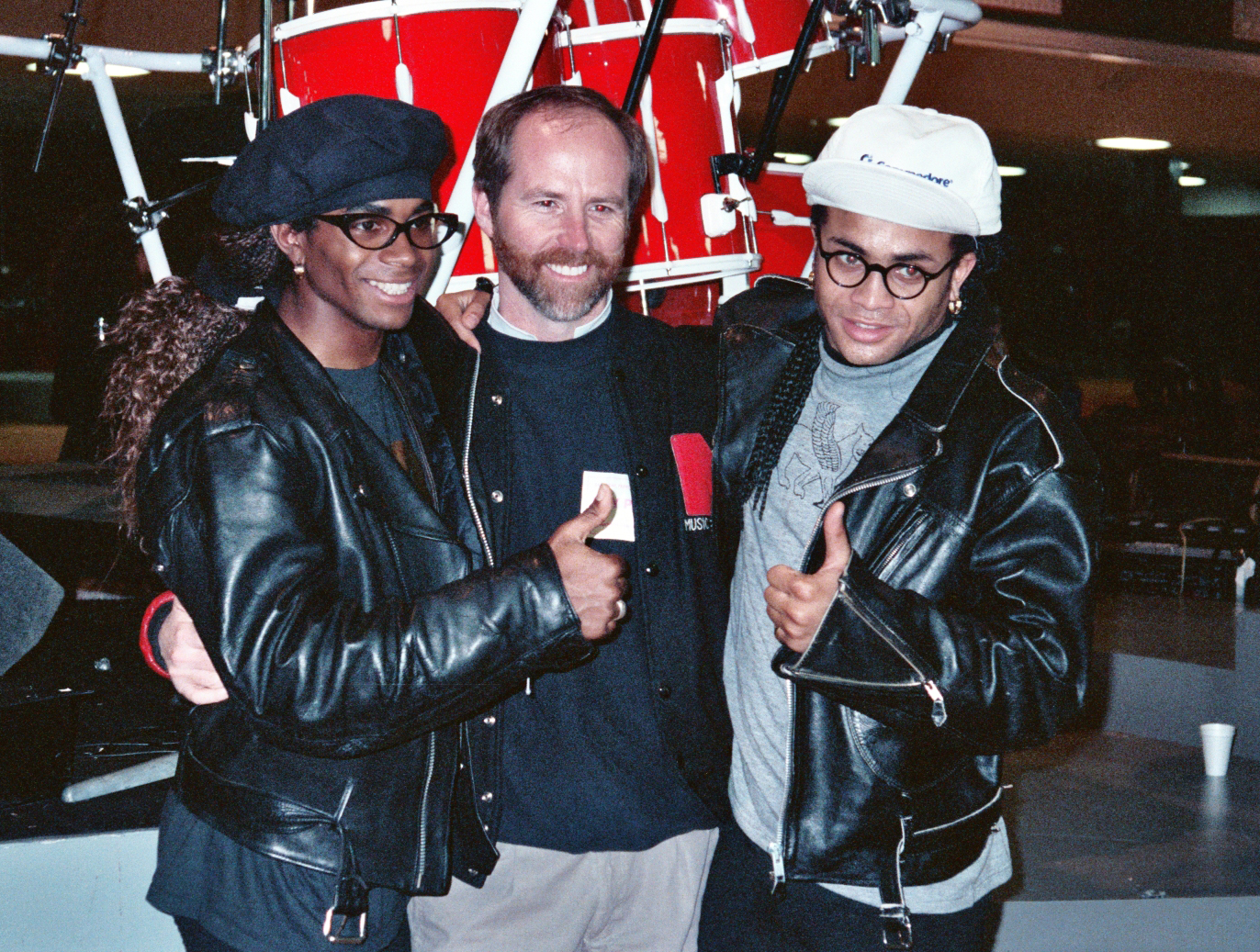
Milli Vanilli obtained their only New Zealand number-one single in 1990: "All or Nothing".

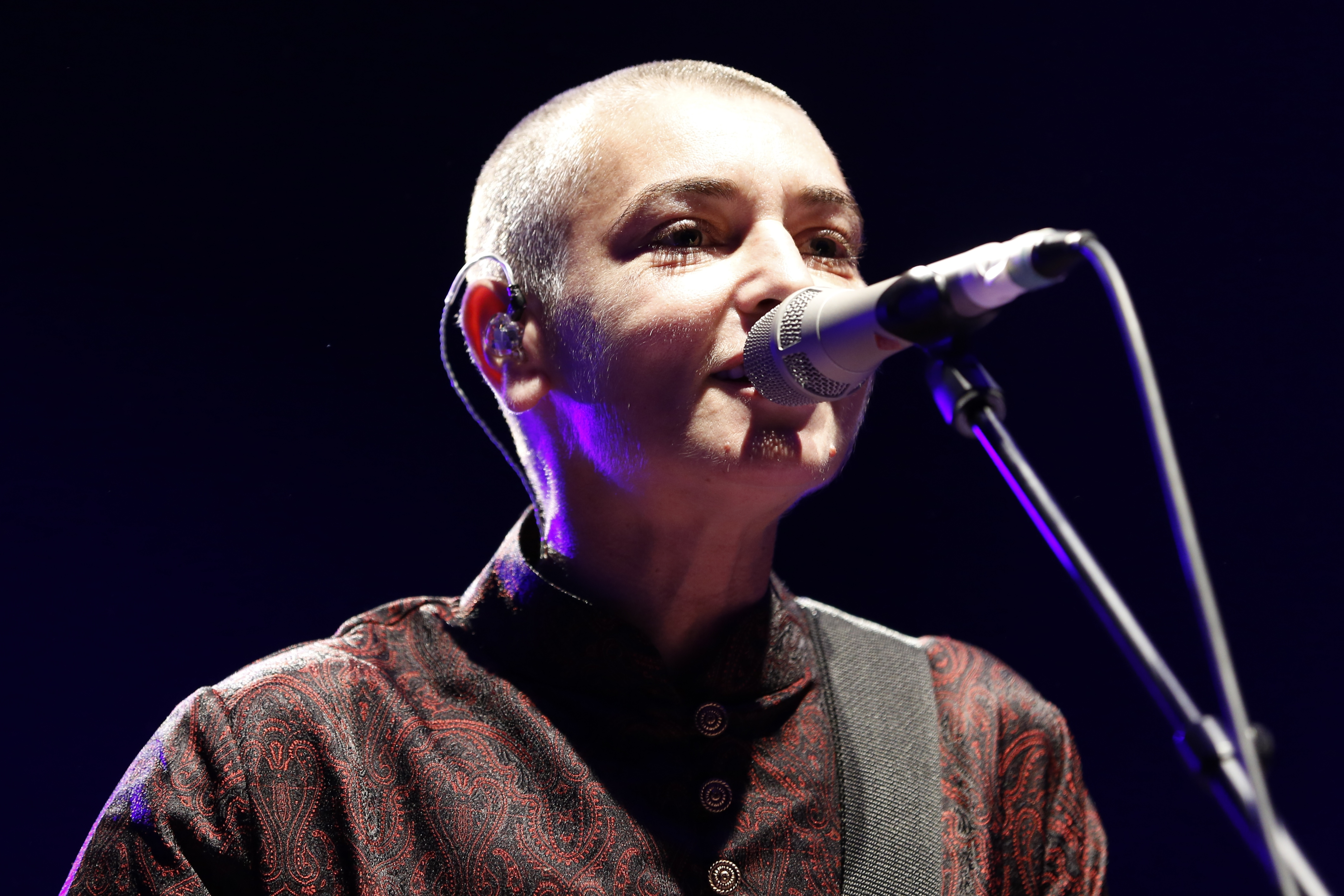
Sinéad O'Connor reached number one for five weeks with "Nothing Compares 2 U".

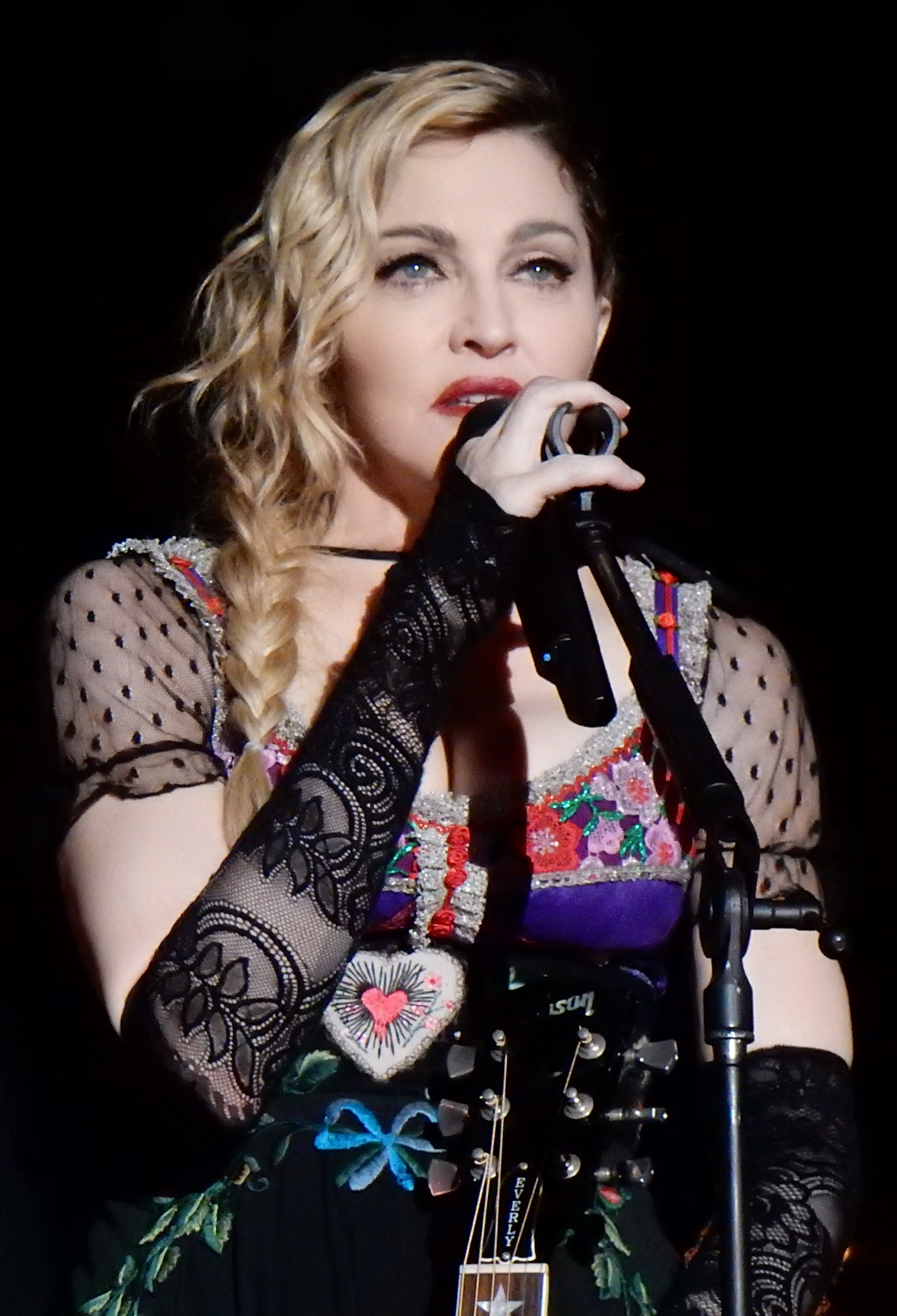
"Vogue" became Madonna's only New Zealand chart-topper during the 1990s.

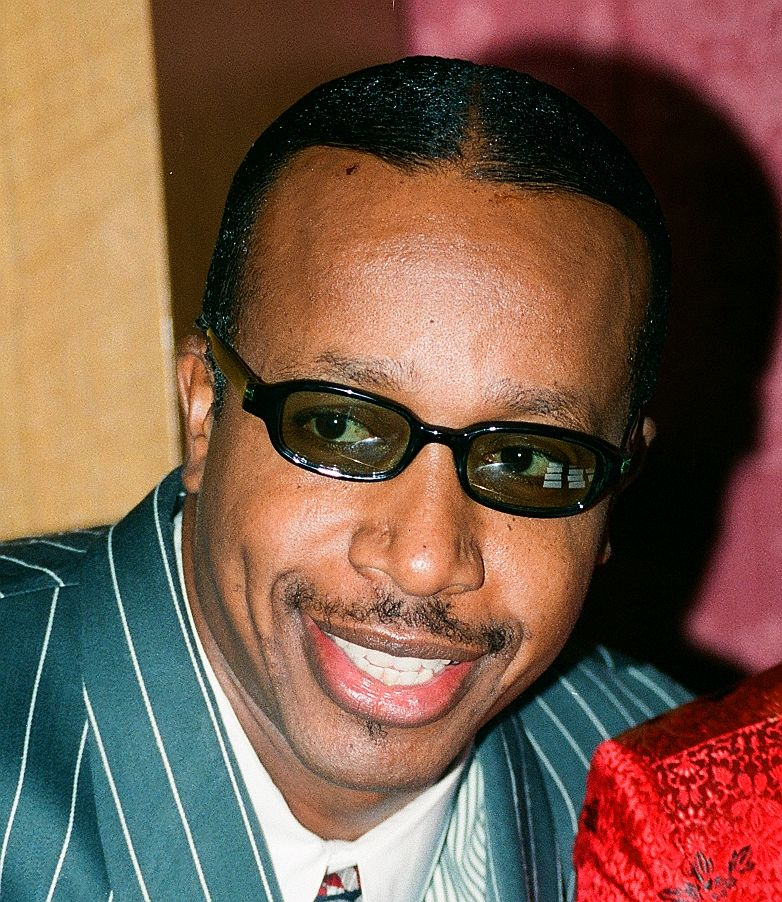
The highest-selling single of 1990 in New Zealand was MC Hammer's "U Can't Touch This" / "Dancin' Machine", which spent six weeks at number one.

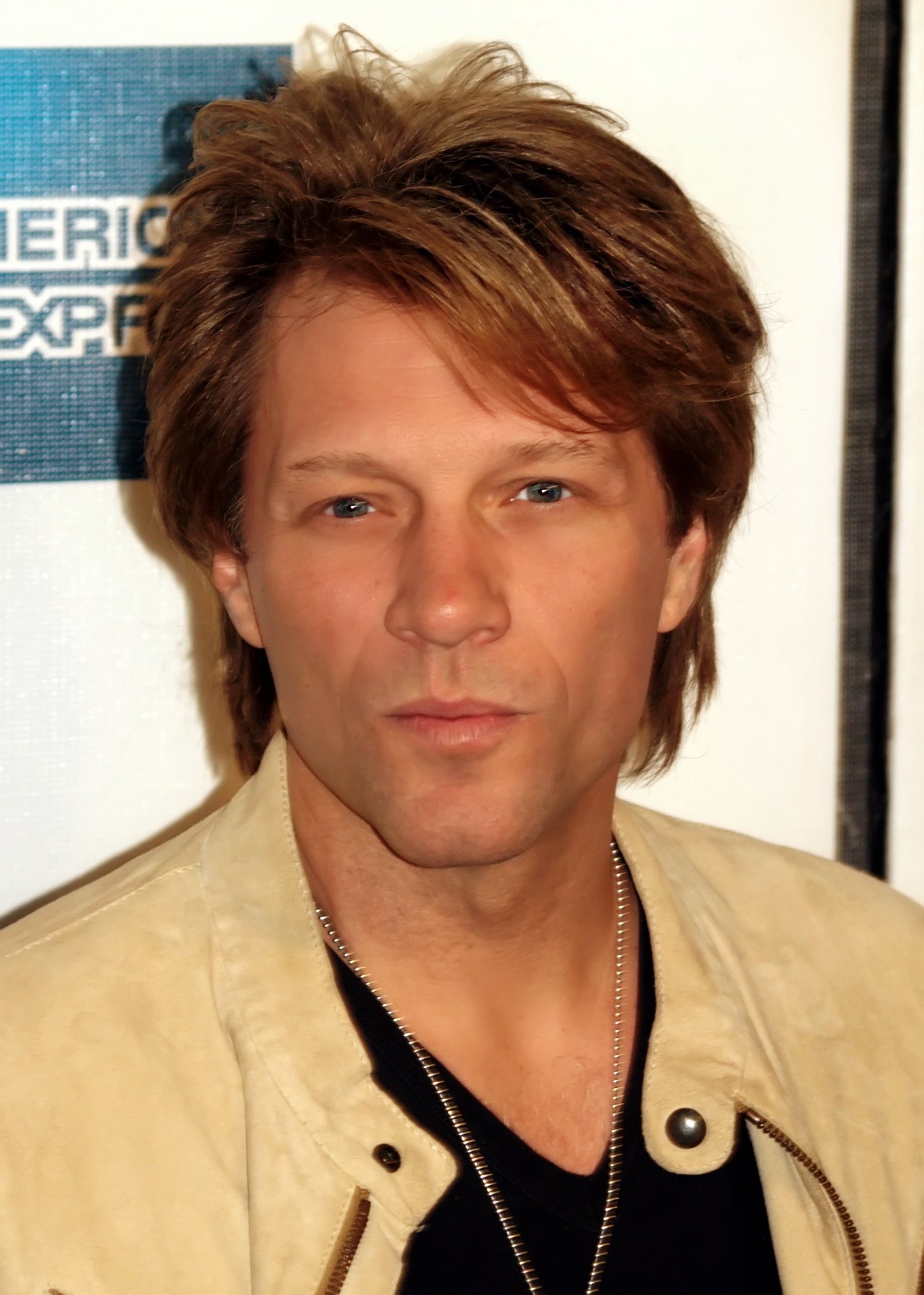
Jon Bon Jovi spent three weeks at the top with "Blaze of Glory".

Date	Artist	Single	Weeks at number one	Ref.
7 January	Margaret Urlich	"Escaping"	6 weeks (5 in 1989)	
14 January	The B-52's	"Love Shack"	4 weeks	
21 January	The B-52's	"Love Shack"	4 weeks	
28 January	The B-52's	"Love Shack"	4 weeks	
4 February	The B-52's	"Love Shack"	4 weeks	
11 February	John Grenell	"Welcome to Our World"	3 weeks	
18 February	John Grenell	"Welcome to Our World"	3 weeks	
25 February	John Grenell	"Welcome to Our World"	3 weeks	
4 March	Milli Vanilli	"All or Nothing"	1 week	
11 March	Sybil	"Don't Make Me Over"	4 weeks	
18 March	Sybil	"Don't Make Me Over"	4 weeks	
25 March	Sybil	"Don't Make Me Over"	4 weeks	
1 April	Sybil	"Don't Make Me Over"	4 weeks	
8 April	Sinéad O'Connor	"Nothing Compares 2 U"	5 weeks	
15 April	Sinéad O'Connor	"Nothing Compares 2 U"	5 weeks	
22 April	Sinéad O'Connor	"Nothing Compares 2 U"	5 weeks	
29 April	Sinéad O'Connor	"Nothing Compares 2 U"	5 weeks	
6 May	Sinéad O'Connor	"Nothing Compares 2 U"	5 weeks	
13 May	Jamie J. Morgan	"Walk on the Wild Side"	2 weeks	
20 May	Jamie J. Morgan	"Walk on the Wild Side"	2 weeks	
27 May	Madonna	"Vogue"	4 weeks	
3 June	Madonna	"Vogue"	4 weeks	
10 June	Madonna	"Vogue"	4 weeks	
17 June	Madonna	"Vogue"	4 weeks	
24 June	Daddy Cool	"Eagle Rock"	4 weeks	
1 July	Daddy Cool	"Eagle Rock"	4 weeks	
8 July	Daddy Cool	"Eagle Rock"	4 weeks	
15 July	Daddy Cool	"Eagle Rock"	4 weeks	
22 July	MC Hammer	"U Can't Touch This" / "Dancin' Machine"	6 weeks	
29 July	MC Hammer	"U Can't Touch This" / "Dancin' Machine"	6 weeks	
5 August	MC Hammer	"U Can't Touch This" / "Dancin' Machine"	6 weeks	
12 August	MC Hammer	"U Can't Touch This" / "Dancin' Machine"	6 weeks	
19 August	MC Hammer	"U Can't Touch This" / "Dancin' Machine"	6 weeks	
26 August	MC Hammer	"U Can't Touch This" / "Dancin' Machine"	6 weeks	
2 September	Mariah Carey	"Vision of Love"	2 weeks	
9 September	Mariah Carey	"Vision of Love"	2 weeks	
16 September	Jon Bon Jovi	"Blaze of Glory"	3 weeks	
23 September	Jon Bon Jovi	"Blaze of Glory"	3 weeks	
30 September	Jon Bon Jovi	"Blaze of Glory"	3 weeks	
7 October	INXS	"Suicide Blonde"	3 weeks	
14 October	INXS	"Suicide Blonde"	3 weeks	
21 October	INXS	"Suicide Blonde"	3 weeks	
28 October	Ngaire	"To Sir with Love"	5 weeks	
4 November	Ngaire	"To Sir with Love"	5 weeks	
11 November	Ngaire	"To Sir with Love"	5 weeks	
18 November	Ngaire	"To Sir with Love"	5 weeks	
25 November	Ngaire	"To Sir with Love"	5 weeks	
2 December	Vanilla Ice	"Ice Ice Baby"	8 weeks	
9 December	Vanilla Ice	"Ice Ice Baby"	8 weeks	
16 December	Vanilla Ice	"Ice Ice Baby"	8 weeks	
23 December	Vanilla Ice	"Ice Ice Baby"	8 weeks	
30 December	Vanilla Ice	"Ice Ice Baby"	8 weeks	

== 1991 ==
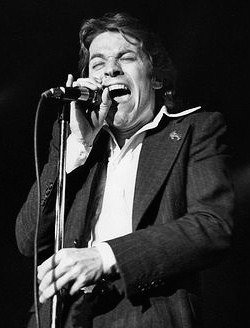
Robert Palmer collaborated with UB40 on "I'll Be Your Baby Tonight", which spent a week at number one in 1991.

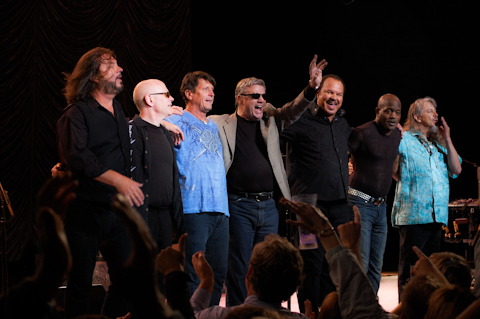
Originally released in 1973, "The Joker" by the Steve Miller Band climbed to number one for a week in May 1991.

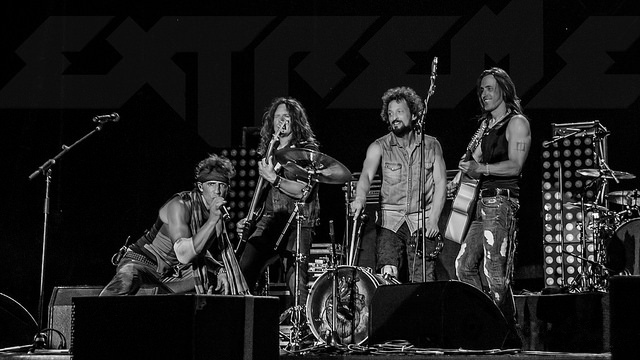
American rock band Extreme earned their sole number one, "More Than Words", in 1991; it spent two nonconsecutive weeks at the summit.

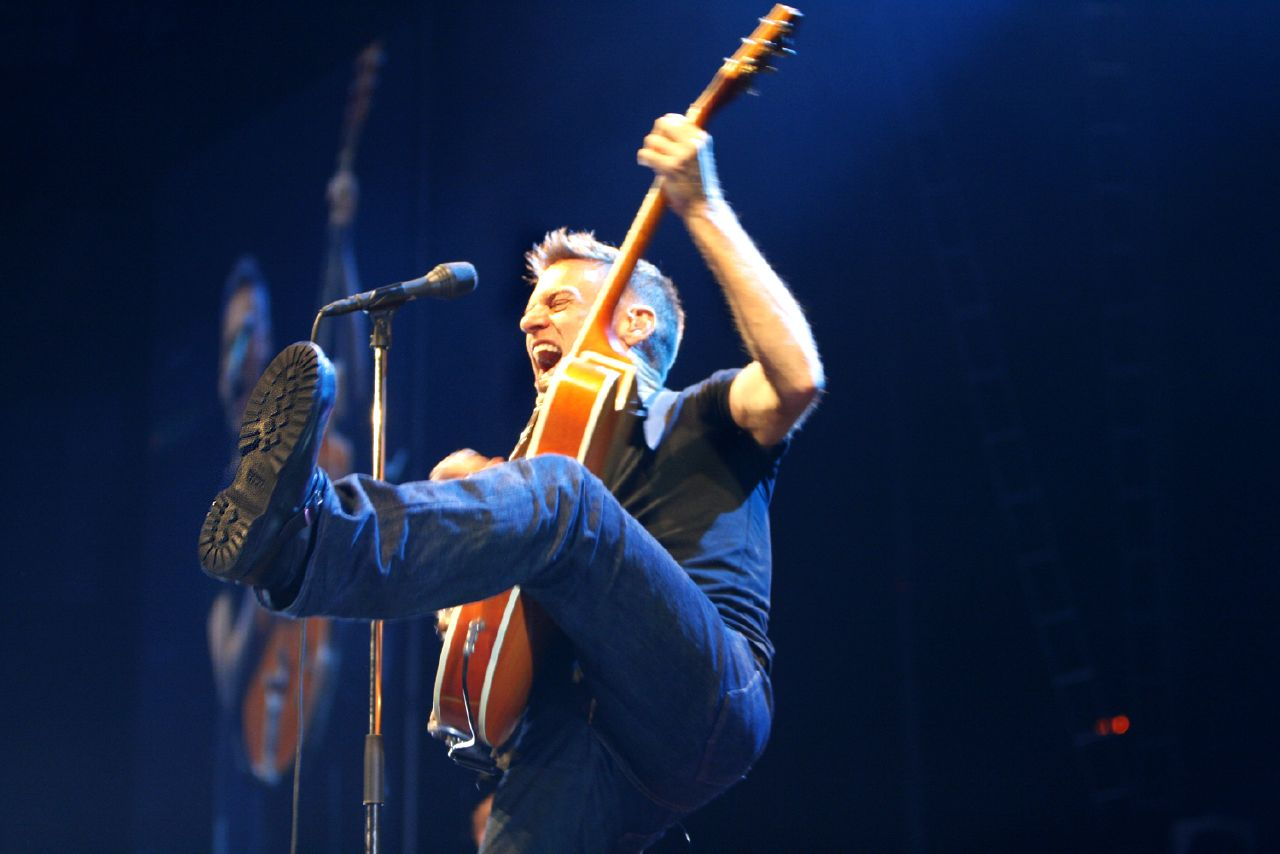
Canadian singer Bryan Adams topped the New Zealand chart for eight weeks with "(Everything I Do) I Do It for You".

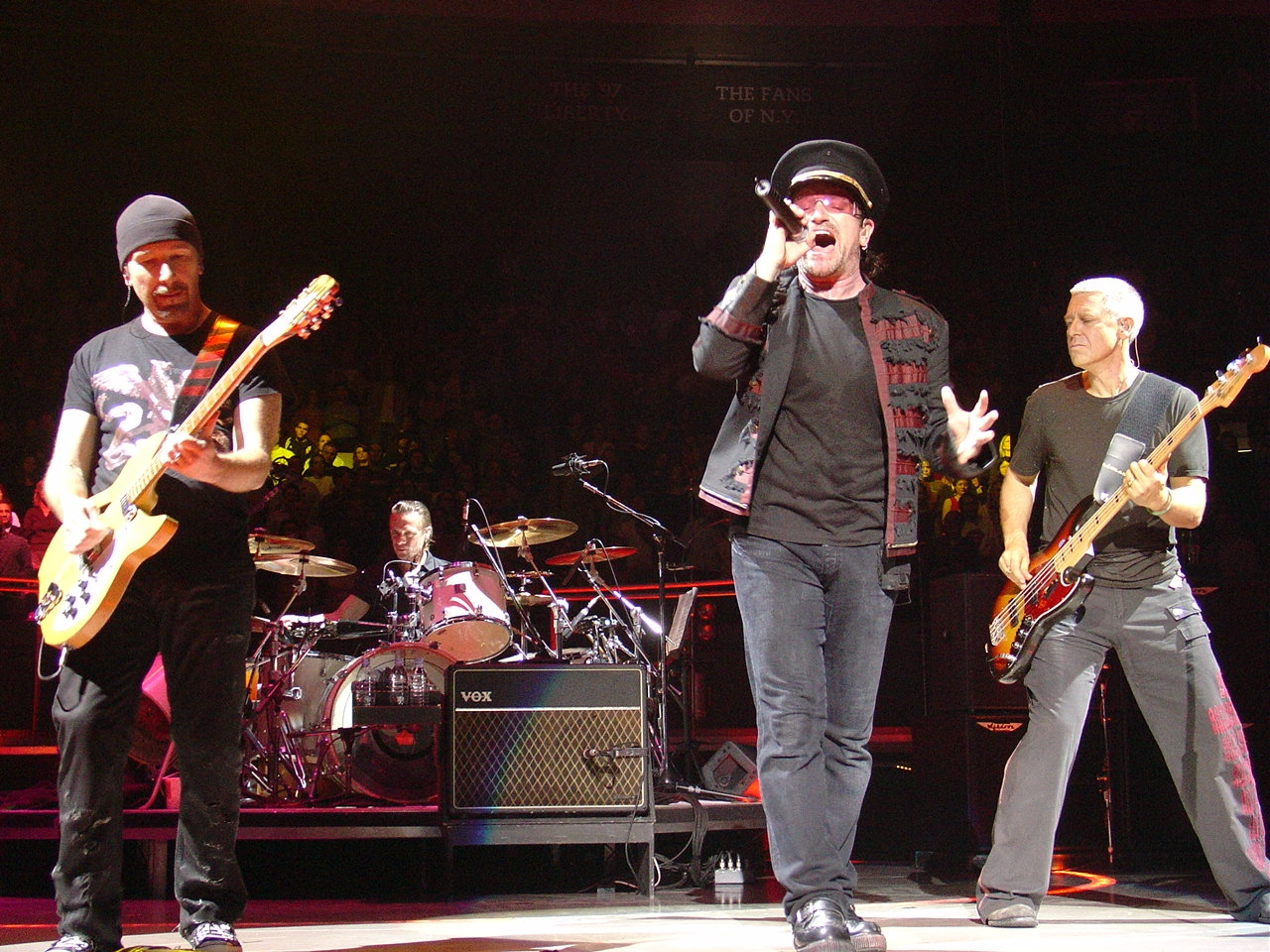
Irish band U2 earned three number-one singles in New Zealand during the 1990s: "The Fly", "Hold Me, Thrill Me, Kiss Me, Kill Me", and "Discothèque".

Date	Artist	Single	Weeks at number one	Ref.
6 January	Vanilla Ice	"Ice Ice Baby"	8 weeks	
13 January	Vanilla Ice	"Ice Ice Baby"	8 weeks	
20 January	Vanilla Ice	"Ice Ice Baby"	8 weeks	
27 January	The Simpsons	"Do the Bartman"	3 weeks	
3 February	Robert Palmer and UB40	"I'll Be Your Baby Tonight"	1 week	
10 February	The Simpsons	"Do the Bartman"	3 weeks	
17 February	The Simpsons	"Do the Bartman"	3 weeks	
24 February	The Righteous Brothers	"Unchained Melody"	7 weeks	
3 March	The Righteous Brothers	"Unchained Melody"	7 weeks	
10 March	The Righteous Brothers	"Unchained Melody"	7 weeks	
17 March	The Righteous Brothers	"Unchained Melody"	7 weeks	
24 March	The Righteous Brothers	"Unchained Melody"	7 weeks	
31 March	The Righteous Brothers	"Unchained Melody"	7 weeks	
7 April	The Righteous Brothers	"Unchained Melody"	7 weeks	
14 April	Push Push	"Trippin'"	6 weeks	
21 April	Push Push	"Trippin'"	6 weeks	
28 April	Push Push	"Trippin'"	6 weeks	
5 May	Push Push	"Trippin'"	6 weeks	
12 May	Steve Miller Band	"The Joker"	1 week	
19 May	Push Push	"Trippin'"	6 weeks	
26 May	Push Push	"Trippin'"	6 weeks	
2 June	The Parker Project	"Tears on My Pillow"	1 week	
9 June	Father MC	"I'll Do 4 U"	3 weeks	
16 June	Father MC	"I'll Do 4 U"	3 weeks	
23 June	Father MC	"I'll Do 4 U"	3 weeks	
30 June	AC/DC	"Are You Ready"	1 week	
7 July	Extreme	"More Than Words"	2 weeks	
14 July	Color Me Badd	"I Wanna Sex You Up"	2 weeks	
21 July	Color Me Badd	"I Wanna Sex You Up"	2 weeks	
28 July	Extreme	"More Than Words"	2 weeks	
4 August	Aaron Neville	"Everybody Plays the Fool"	2 weeks	
11 August	Aaron Neville	"Everybody Plays the Fool"	2 weeks	
18 August	Bryan Adams	"(Everything I Do) I Do It for You"	8 weeks	
25 August	Bryan Adams	"(Everything I Do) I Do It for You"	8 weeks	
1 September	Bryan Adams	"(Everything I Do) I Do It for You"	8 weeks	
8 September	Bryan Adams	"(Everything I Do) I Do It for You"	8 weeks	
15 September	Bryan Adams	"(Everything I Do) I Do It for You"	8 weeks	
22 September	Bryan Adams	"(Everything I Do) I Do It for You"	8 weeks	
29 September	Bryan Adams	"(Everything I Do) I Do It for You"	8 weeks	
6 October	Bryan Adams	"(Everything I Do) I Do It for You"	8 weeks	
13 October	Color Me Badd	"All 4 Love"	1 week	
20 October	P.M. Dawn	"Set Adrift on Memory Bliss"	2 weeks	
27 October	P.M. Dawn	"Set Adrift on Memory Bliss"	2 weeks	
3 November	U2	"The Fly"	3 weeks	
10 November	U2	"The Fly"	3 weeks	
17 November	U2	"The Fly"	3 weeks	
24 November	Michael Jackson	"Black or White"	8 weeks	
1 December	Michael Jackson	"Black or White"	8 weeks	
8 December	Michael Jackson	"Black or White"	8 weeks	
15 December	Michael Jackson	"Black or White"	8 weeks	
22 December	Michael Jackson	"Black or White"	8 weeks	
29 December	Michael Jackson	"Black or White"	8 weeks	

== 1992 ==
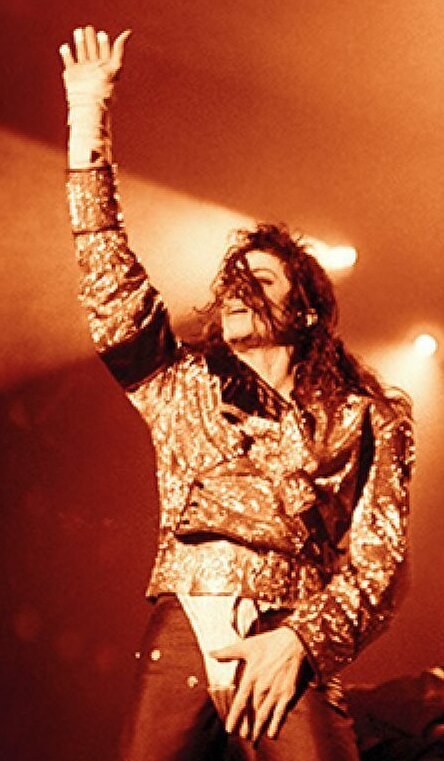
Michael Jackson spent 22 weeks at number one during the 1990s with six singles: "Black or White", "Remember the Time", "Give In to Me", "Scream", "You Are Not Alone", and "Blood on the Dance Floor".

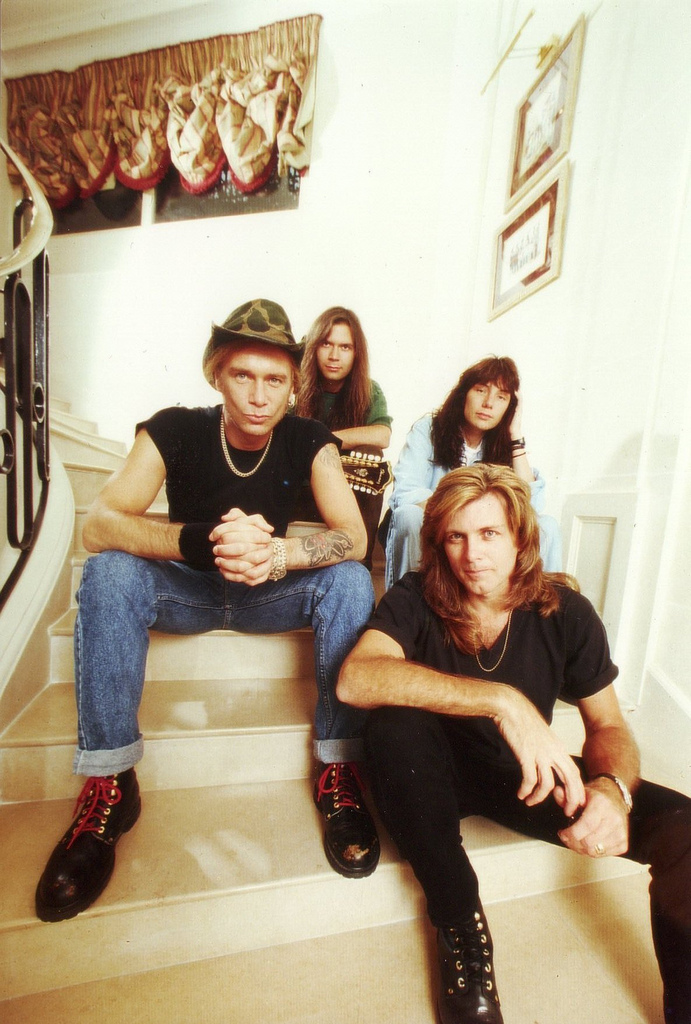
Mr. Big's "To Be with You" peaked atop the chart for five weeks in March and April 1992.

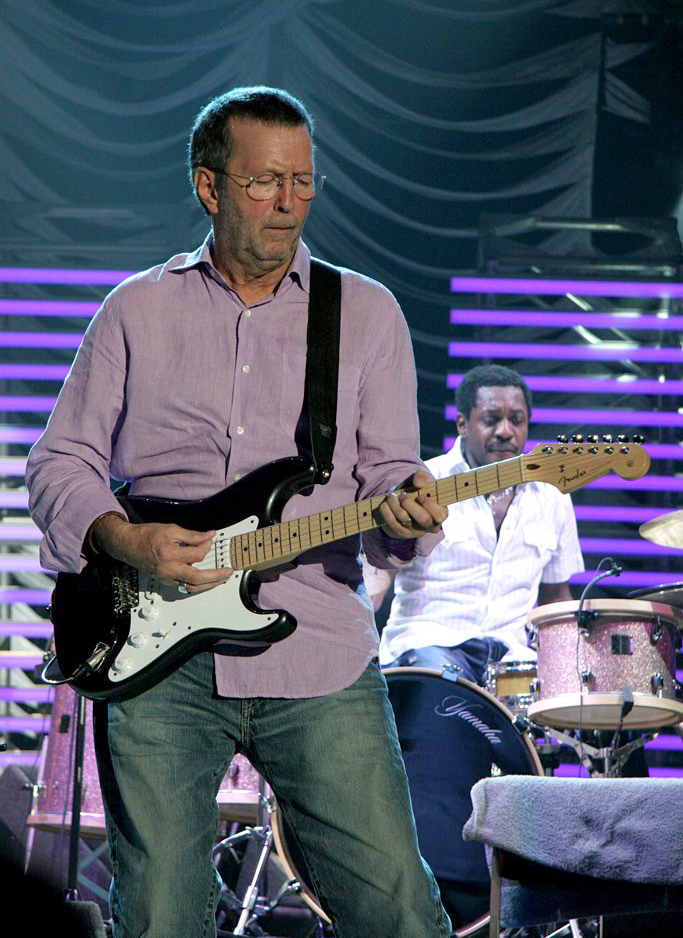
Eric Clapton had a five-week stint at number one with "Tears in Heaven".

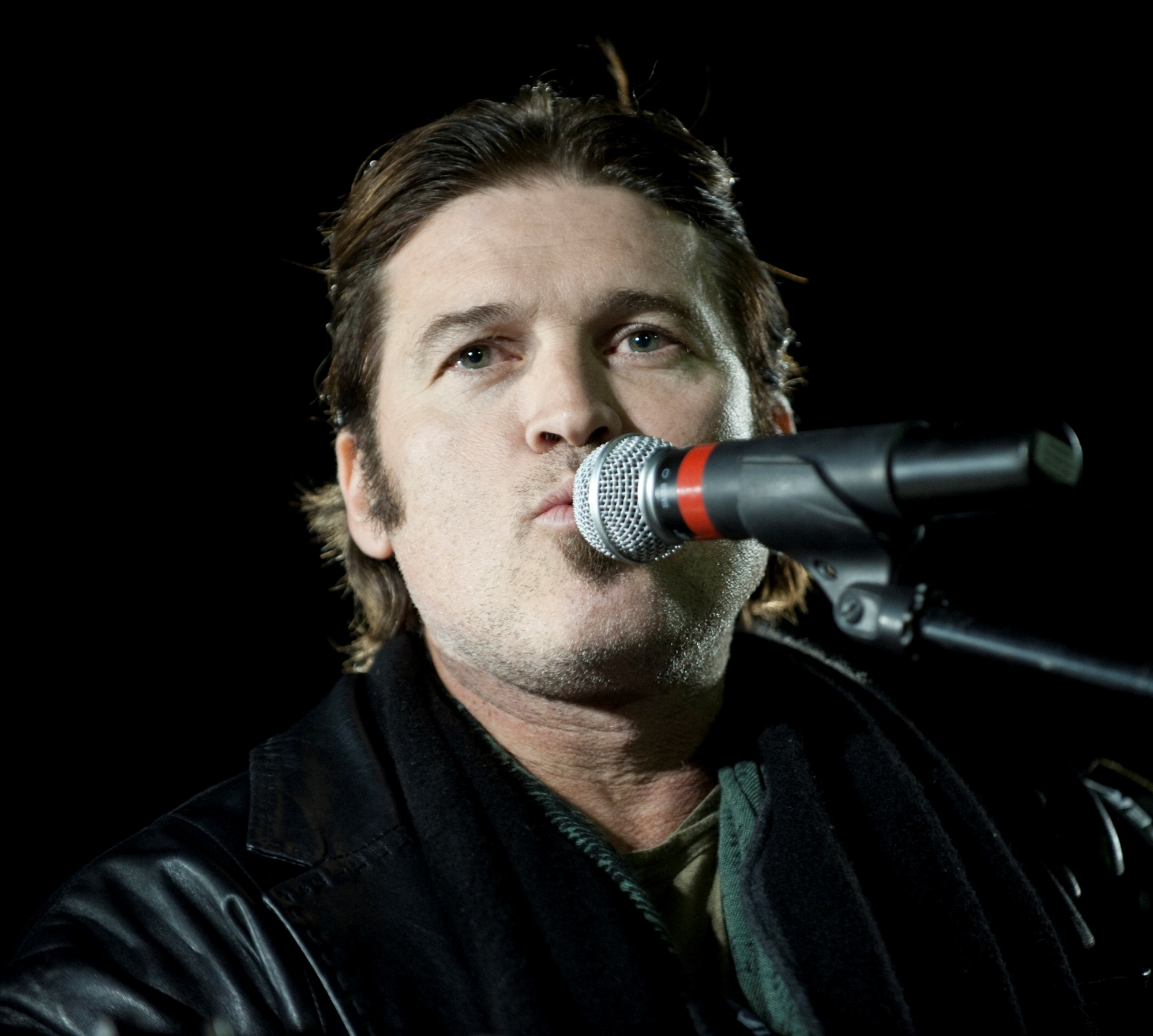
"Achy Breaky Heart" by Billy Ray Cyrus was 1992's most successful single, ranking at number one for six weeks.

Date	Artist	Single	Weeks at number one	Ref.
5 January	Michael Jackson	"Black or White"	8 weeks	
12 January	Michael Jackson	"Black or White"	8 weeks	
19 January	Right Said Fred	"I'm Too Sexy"	1 week	
26 January	Guns N' Roses	"Live and Let Die"	2 weeks	
2 February	Guns N' Roses	"Live and Let Die"	2 weeks	
9 February	Big Audio Dynamite II	"Rush"	2 weeks	
16 February	Big Audio Dynamite II	"Rush"	2 weeks	
23 February	Nirvana	"Smells Like Teen Spirit"	1 week	
1 March	Michael Jackson	"Remember the Time"	2 weeks	
8 March	Michael Jackson	"Remember the Time"	2 weeks	
15 March	The KLF featuring Tammy Wynette	"Justified & Ancient (Stand by The JAMs)"	1 week	
22 March	Mr. Big	"To Be with You"	5 weeks	
29 March	Mr. Big	"To Be with You"	5 weeks	
5 April	Mr. Big	"To Be with You"	5 weeks	
12 April	Mr. Big	"To Be with You"	5 weeks	
19 April	Mr. Big	"To Be with You"	5 weeks	
26 April	A Lighter Shade of Brown featuring Shiro and Huggy Boy	"On a Sunday Afternoon"	2 weeks	
3 May	A Lighter Shade of Brown featuring Shiro and Huggy Boy	"On a Sunday Afternoon"	2 weeks	
10 May	Eric Clapton	"Tears in Heaven"	5 weeks	
17 May	Eric Clapton	"Tears in Heaven"	5 weeks	
24 May	Eric Clapton	"Tears in Heaven"	5 weeks	
31 May	Eric Clapton	"Tears in Heaven"	5 weeks	
7 June	Eric Clapton	"Tears in Heaven"	5 weeks	
14 June	Kris Kross	"Jump"	2 weeks	
21 June	Kris Kross	"Jump"	2 weeks	
28 June	Riff	"White Men Can't Jump"	3 weeks	
5 July	Riff	"White Men Can't Jump"	3 weeks	
12 July	Riff	"White Men Can't Jump"	3 weeks	
19 July	Mariah Carey featuring Trey Lorenz	"I'll Be There"	5 weeks	
26 July	Mariah Carey featuring Trey Lorenz	"I'll Be There"	5 weeks	
2 August	Mariah Carey featuring Trey Lorenz	"I'll Be There"	5 weeks	
9 August	Mariah Carey featuring Trey Lorenz	"I'll Be There"	5 weeks	
16 August	Mariah Carey featuring Trey Lorenz	"I'll Be There"	5 weeks	
23 August	Hammond Gamble	"You Make the Whole World Smile"	3 weeks	
30 August	Hammond Gamble	"You Make the Whole World Smile"	3 weeks	
6 September	Billy Ray Cyrus	"Achy Breaky Heart"	6 weeks	
13 September	Billy Ray Cyrus	"Achy Breaky Heart"	6 weeks	
20 September	Billy Ray Cyrus	"Achy Breaky Heart"	6 weeks	
27 September	Billy Ray Cyrus	"Achy Breaky Heart"	6 weeks	
4 October	Billy Ray Cyrus	"Achy Breaky Heart"	6 weeks	
11 October	Billy Ray Cyrus	"Achy Breaky Heart"	6 weeks	
18 October	Boyz II Men	"End of the Road"	7 weeks	
25 October	Boyz II Men	"End of the Road"	7 weeks	
1 November	Boyz II Men	"End of the Road"	7 weeks	
8 November	Boyz II Men	"End of the Road"	7 weeks	
15 November	Boyz II Men	"End of the Road"	7 weeks	
22 November	Boyz II Men	"End of the Road"	7 weeks	
29 November	Boyz II Men	"End of the Road"	7 weeks	
6 December	Charles & Eddie	"Would I Lie to You?"	2 weeks	
13 December	Charles & Eddie	"Would I Lie to You?"	2 weeks	
20 December	Whitney Houston	"I Will Always Love You"	14 weeks	
27 December	Whitney Houston	"I Will Always Love You"	14 weeks	

== 1993 ==
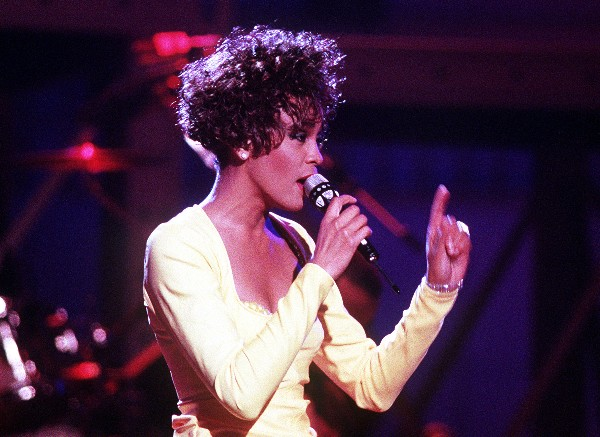
"I Will Always Love You" by Whitney Houston spent 14 weeks at number one in 1992 and 1993. She topped the chart again in 1999 with "My Love Is Your Love".

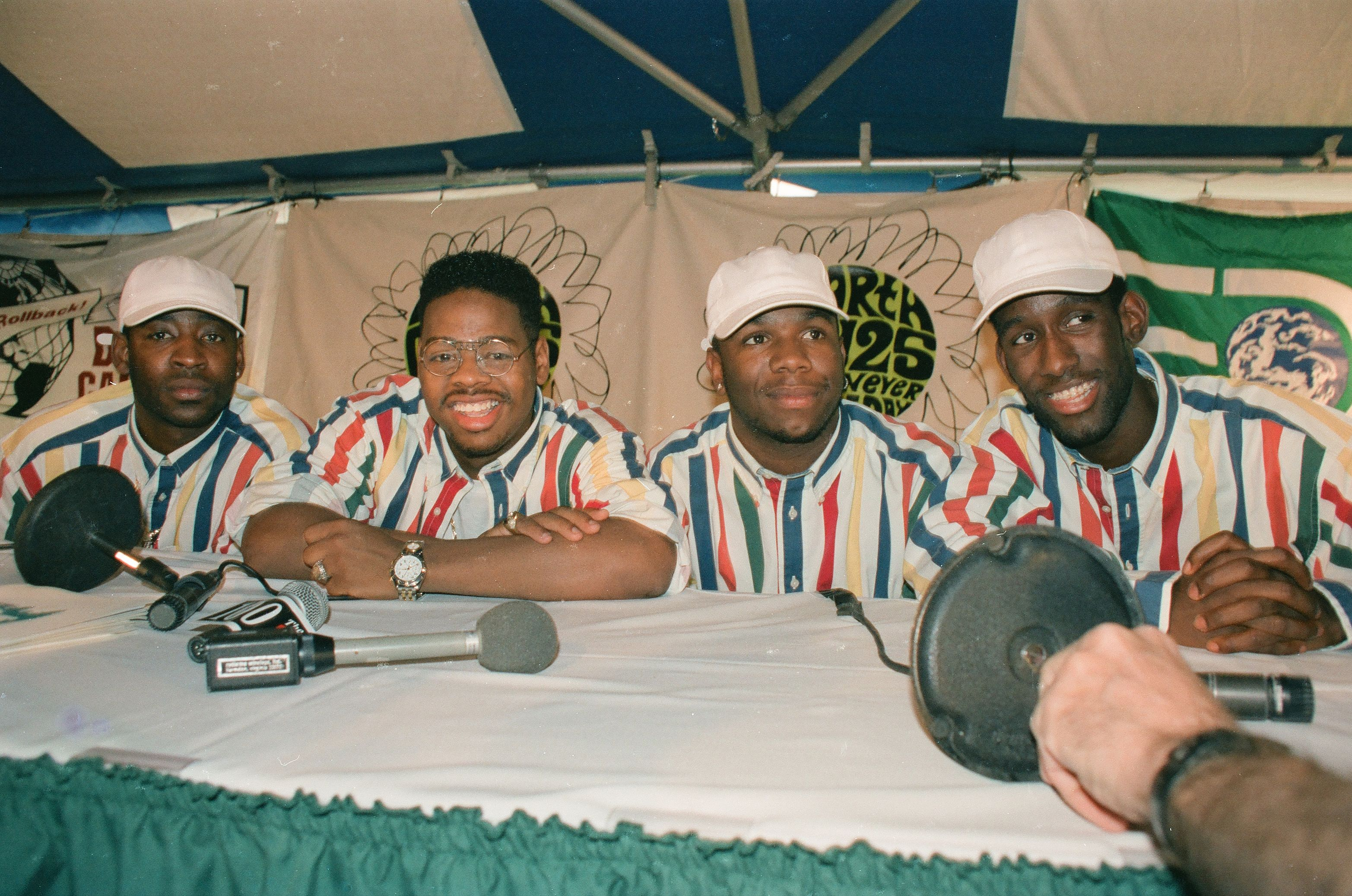
R&B group Boyz II Men scored four number-one singles in New Zealand during the decade: "End of the Road", "In the Still of the Nite (I'll Remember)", "I'll Make Love to You", and "One Sweet Day".

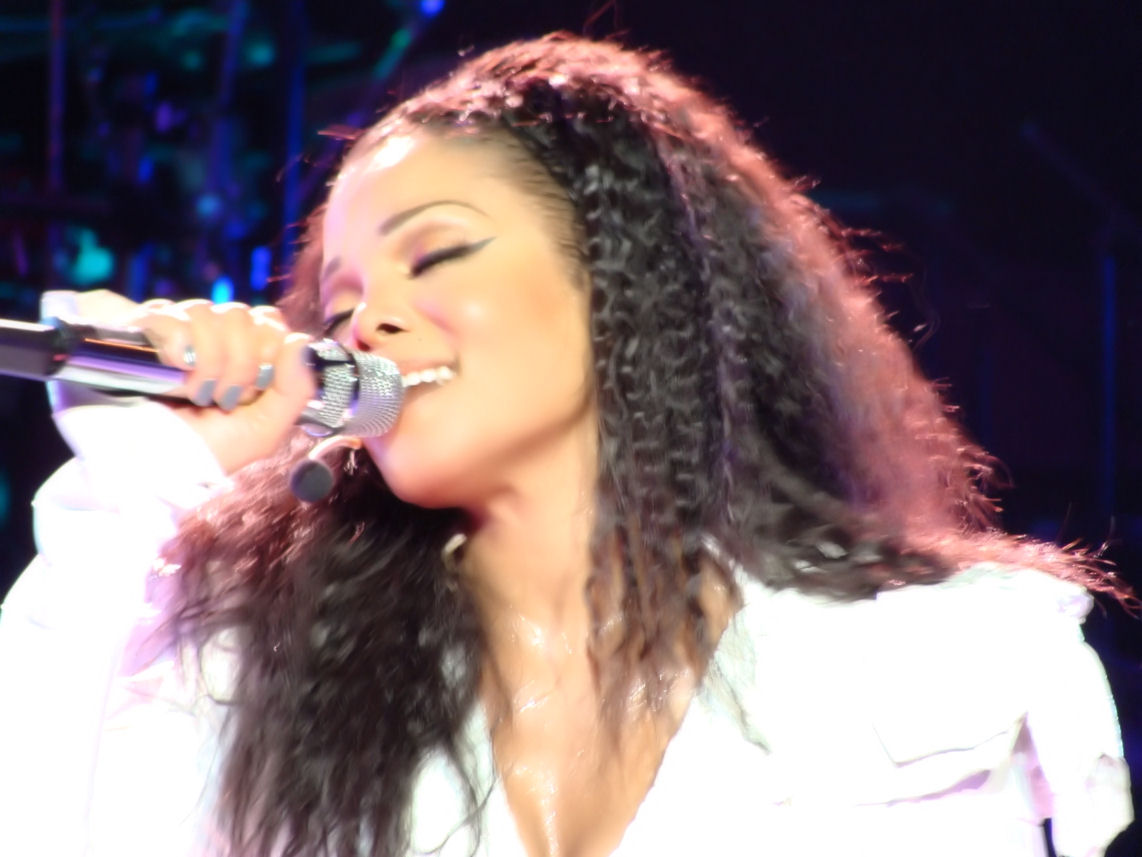
Three singles by Janet Jackson reached the top position during the 1990s: "That's the Way Love Goes", "Whoops Now/What'll I Do", and "Scream".

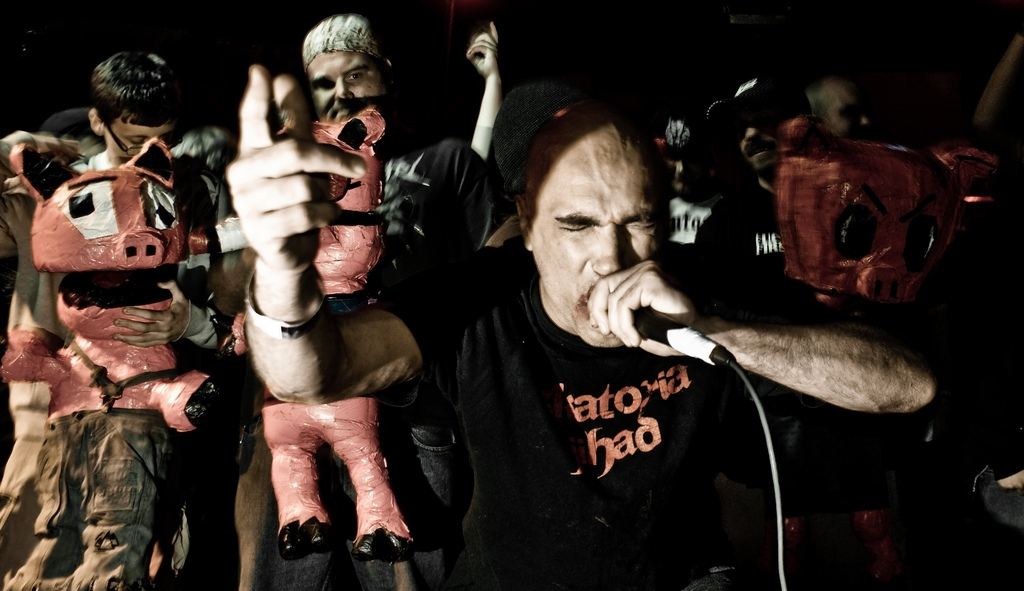
Comedy rock band Green Jellÿ spent two separate weeks at number one in September 1993 with "Three Little Pigs".

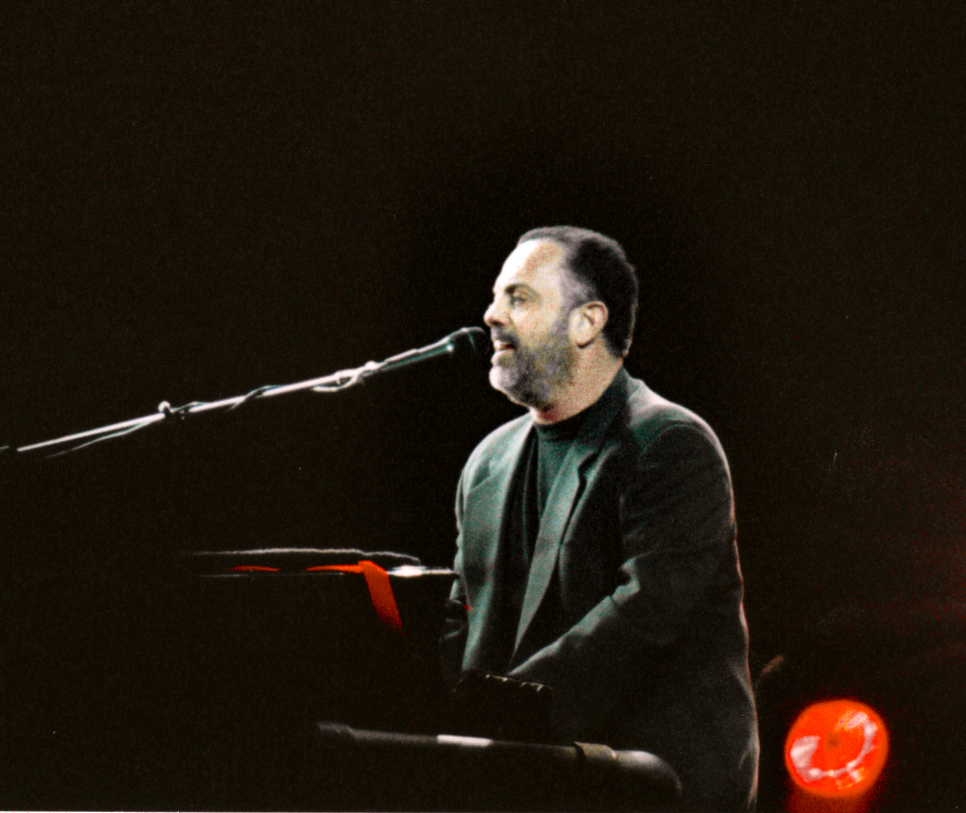
"The River of Dreams" gave Billy Joel his second number-one hit in New Zealand.

Date	Artist	Single	Weeks at number one	Ref.
3 January	Whitney Houston	"I Will Always Love You"	14 weeks	
10 January	Whitney Houston	"I Will Always Love You"	14 weeks	
17 January	Whitney Houston	"I Will Always Love You"	14 weeks	
24 January	Whitney Houston	"I Will Always Love You"	14 weeks	
31 January	Whitney Houston	"I Will Always Love You"	14 weeks	
7 February	Whitney Houston	"I Will Always Love You"	14 weeks	
14 February	Whitney Houston	"I Will Always Love You"	14 weeks	
21 February	Whitney Houston	"I Will Always Love You"	14 weeks	
28 February	Whitney Houston	"I Will Always Love You"	14 weeks	
7 March	Whitney Houston	"I Will Always Love You"	14 weeks	
14 March	Whitney Houston	"I Will Always Love You"	14 weeks	
21 March	Whitney Houston	"I Will Always Love You"	14 weeks	
28 March	Boyz II Men	"In the Still of the Nite (I'll Remember)"	2 weeks	
4 April	Boyz II Men	"In the Still of the Nite (I'll Remember)"	2 weeks	
11 April	Michael Jackson	"Give In to Me"	4 weeks	
18 April	Michael Jackson	"Give In to Me"	4 weeks	
25 April	Michael Jackson	"Give In to Me"	4 weeks	
2 May	Michael Jackson	"Give In to Me"	4 weeks	
9 May	Snow	"Informer"	3 weeks	
16 May	Snow	"Informer"	3 weeks	
23 May	Snow	"Informer"	3 weeks	
30 May	Janet Jackson	"That's the Way Love Goes"	2 weeks	
6 June	Janet Jackson	"That's the Way Love Goes"	2 weeks	
13 June	UB40	"(I Can't Help) Falling in Love with You"	11 weeks	
20 June	UB40	"(I Can't Help) Falling in Love with You"	11 weeks	
27 June	UB40	"(I Can't Help) Falling in Love with You"	11 weeks	
4 July	UB40	"(I Can't Help) Falling in Love with You"	11 weeks	
11 July	UB40	"(I Can't Help) Falling in Love with You"	11 weeks	
18 July	UB40	"(I Can't Help) Falling in Love with You"	11 weeks	
25 July	UB40	"(I Can't Help) Falling in Love with You"	11 weeks	
1 August	UB40	"(I Can't Help) Falling in Love with You"	11 weeks	
8 August	UB40	"(I Can't Help) Falling in Love with You"	11 weeks	
15 August	UB40	"(I Can't Help) Falling in Love with You"	11 weeks	
22 August	Hammond Gamble	"You Make the Whole World Smile"	3 weeks	
29 August	UB40	"(I Can't Help) Falling in Love with You"	11 weeks	
5 September	Green Jellÿ	"Three Little Pigs"	2 weeks	
12 September	Billy Joel	"The River of Dreams"	1 week	
19 September	Green Jellÿ	"Three Little Pigs"	2 weeks	
26 September	Meat Loaf	"I'd Do Anything for Love (But I Won't Do That)"	5 weeks	
3 October	Meat Loaf	"I'd Do Anything for Love (But I Won't Do That)"	5 weeks	
10 October	Meat Loaf	"I'd Do Anything for Love (But I Won't Do That)"	5 weeks	
17 October	Meat Loaf	"I'd Do Anything for Love (But I Won't Do That)"	5 weeks	
24 October	Meat Loaf	"I'd Do Anything for Love (But I Won't Do That)"	5 weeks	
31 October	Inner Circle	"Sweat (A La La La La Long)"	4 weeks	
7 November	Inner Circle	"Sweat (A La La La La Long)"	4 weeks	
14 November	Inner Circle	"Sweat (A La La La La Long)"	4 weeks	
21 November	Inner Circle	"Sweat (A La La La La Long)"	4 weeks	
28 November	Bitty McLean	"It Keeps Rainin' (Tears from My Eyes)"	7 weeks	
5 December	Bitty McLean	"It Keeps Rainin' (Tears from My Eyes)"	7 weeks	
12 December	Bitty McLean	"It Keeps Rainin' (Tears from My Eyes)"	7 weeks	
19 December	Bitty McLean	"It Keeps Rainin' (Tears from My Eyes)"	7 weeks	
26 December	Bitty McLean	"It Keeps Rainin' (Tears from My Eyes)"	7 weeks	

== 1994 ==
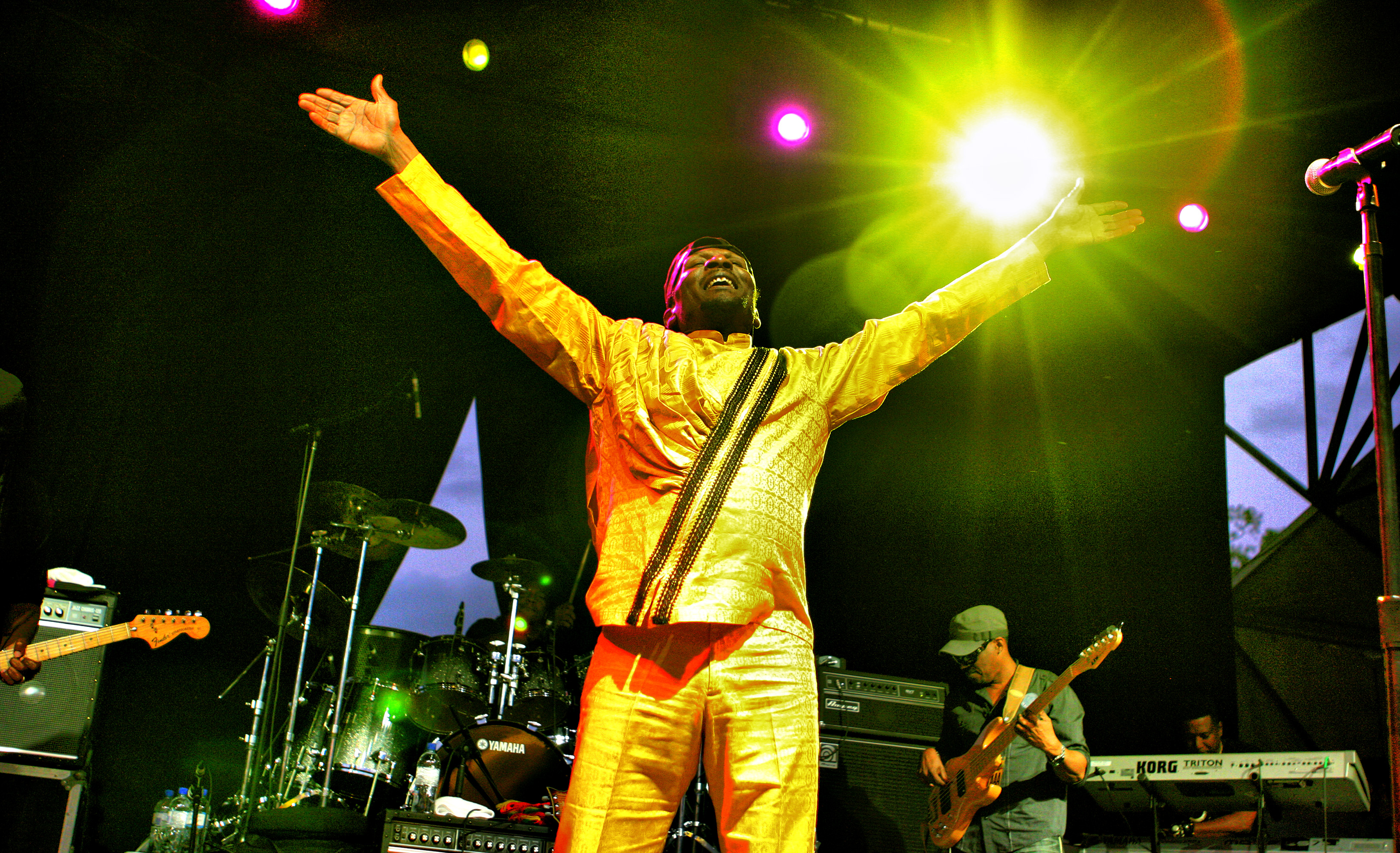
Jamaican singer Jimmy Cliff topped the New Zealand chart for six weeks with his rendition of "I Can See Clearly Now".

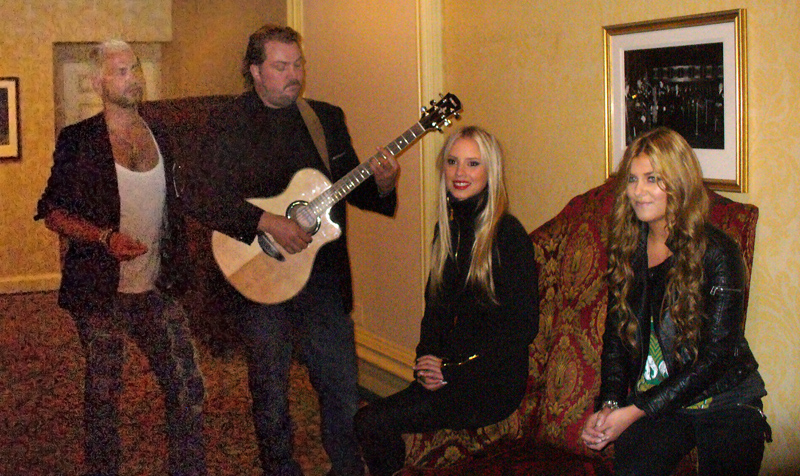
Ace of Base hit number one with "The Sign" for five weeks in mid-1994.

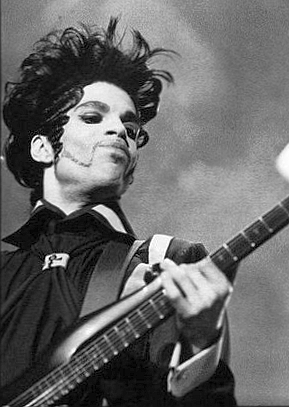
Prince picked up his third New Zealand number-one single in 1994 with "The Most Beautiful Girl in the World".

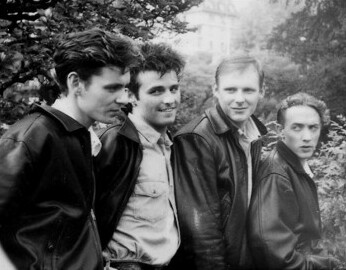
"Love Is All Around" by Wet Wet Wet topped the chart for four weeks to become 1994's highest-selling single in New Zealand.

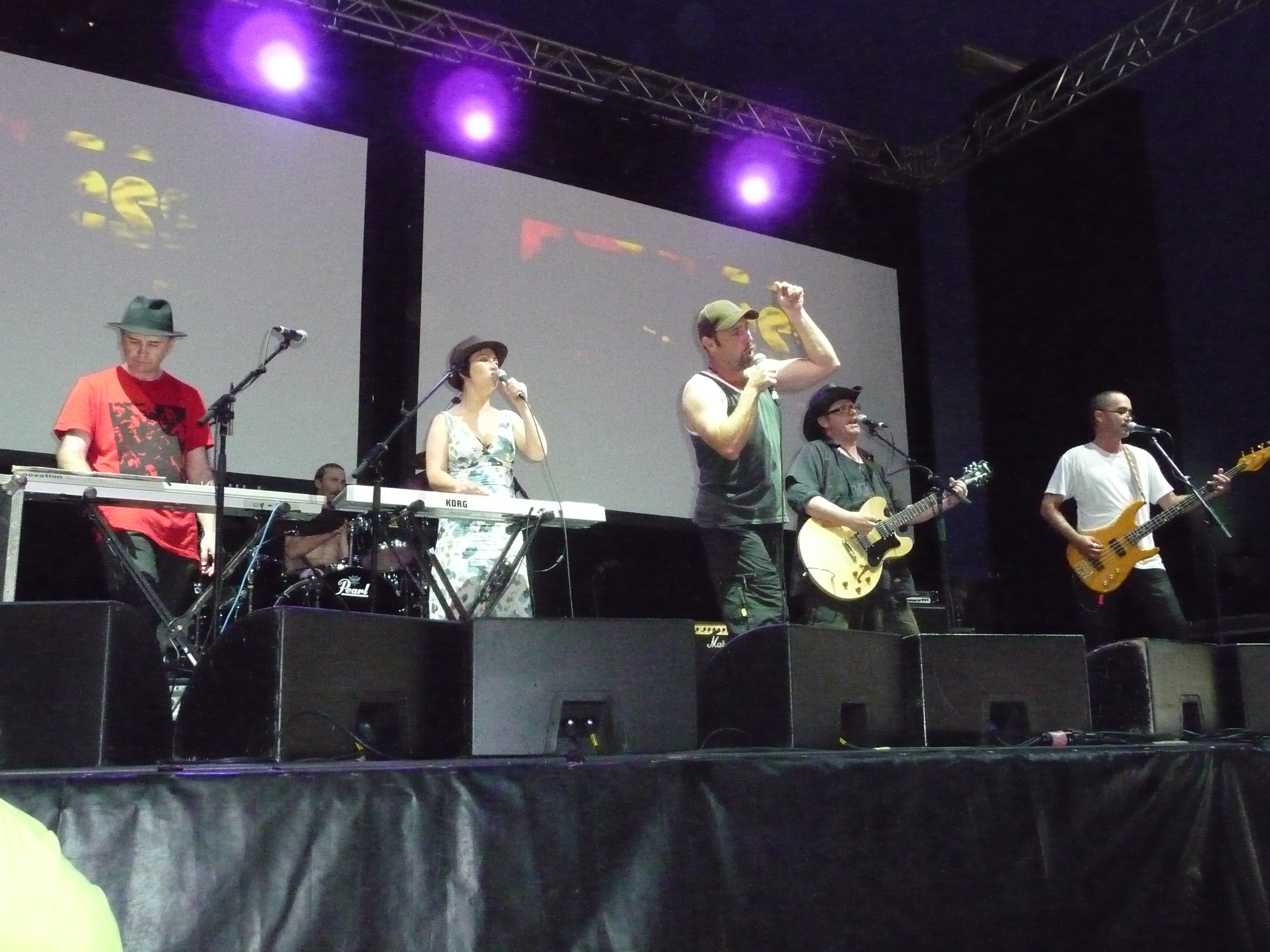
New Zealand band Headless Chickens obtained their only number one with "George" and a remix of their 1991 single "Cruise Control".

Date	Artist	Single	Weeks at number one	Ref.
2 January	Bitty McLean	"It Keeps Rainin' (Tears from My Eyes)"	7 weeks	
9 January	Bitty McLean	"It Keeps Rainin' (Tears from My Eyes)"	7 weeks	
16 January	Jimmy Cliff	"I Can See Clearly Now"	6 weeks	
23 January	Jimmy Cliff	"I Can See Clearly Now"	6 weeks	
30 January	Jimmy Cliff	"I Can See Clearly Now"	6 weeks	
6 February	Jimmy Cliff	"I Can See Clearly Now"	6 weeks	
13 February	Jimmy Cliff	"I Can See Clearly Now"	6 weeks	
20 February	Jimmy Cliff	"I Can See Clearly Now"	6 weeks	
27 February	The Mutton Birds	"The Heater"	1 week	
6 March	3 the Hard Way	"Hip Hop Holiday"	3 weeks	
13 March	3 the Hard Way	"Hip Hop Holiday"	3 weeks	
20 March	3 the Hard Way	"Hip Hop Holiday"	3 weeks	
27 March	DRS	"Gangsta Lean"	3 weeks	
3 April	DRS	"Gangsta Lean"	3 weeks	
10 April	Mariah Carey	"Without You"	1 week	
17 April	DRS	"Gangsta Lean"	3 weeks	
24 April	Ace of Base	"The Sign"	5 weeks	
1 May	Ace of Base	"The Sign"	5 weeks	
8 May	Ace of Base	"The Sign"	5 weeks	
15 May	Ace of Base	"The Sign"	5 weeks	
22 May	Supergroove	"Can't Get Enough"	1 week	
29 May	Ace of Base	"The Sign"	5 weeks	
5 June	Prince	"The Most Beautiful Girl in the World"	4 weeks	
12 June	Prince	"The Most Beautiful Girl in the World"	4 weeks	
19 June	Prince	"The Most Beautiful Girl in the World"	4 weeks	
26 June	Prince	"The Most Beautiful Girl in the World"	4 weeks	
3 July	Wet Wet Wet	"Love Is All Around"	4 weeks	
10 July	All-4-One	"I Swear"	6 weeks	
17 July	All-4-One	"I Swear"	6 weeks	
24 July	All-4-One	"I Swear"	6 weeks	
31 July	All-4-One	"I Swear"	6 weeks	
7 August	All-4-One	"I Swear"	6 weeks	
14 August	All-4-One	"I Swear"	6 weeks	
21 August	Wet Wet Wet	"Love Is All Around"	4 weeks	
28 August	Wet Wet Wet	"Love Is All Around"	4 weeks	
4 September	Wet Wet Wet	"Love Is All Around"	4 weeks	
11 September	Boyz II Men	"I'll Make Love to You"	4 weeks	
18 September	Boyz II Men	"I'll Make Love to You"	4 weeks	
25 September	Boyz II Men	"I'll Make Love to You"	4 weeks	
2 October	Boyz II Men	"I'll Make Love to You"	4 weeks	
9 October	Luther Vandross and Mariah Carey	"Endless Love"	5 weeks	
16 October	Luther Vandross and Mariah Carey	"Endless Love"	5 weeks	
23 October	Luther Vandross and Mariah Carey	"Endless Love"	5 weeks	
30 October	Luther Vandross and Mariah Carey	"Endless Love"	5 weeks	
6 November	Luther Vandross and Mariah Carey	"Endless Love"	5 weeks	
13 November	Pato Banton featuring Ali and Robin Campbell	"Baby Come Back"	4 weeks	
20 November	Pato Banton featuring Ali and Robin Campbell	"Baby Come Back"	4 weeks	
27 November	Pato Banton featuring Ali and Robin Campbell	"Baby Come Back"	4 weeks	
4 December	Pato Banton featuring Ali and Robin Campbell	"Baby Come Back"	4 weeks	
11 December	Headless Chickens	"George" / "Cruise Control"	4 weeks	
18 December	Ini Kamoze	"Here Comes the Hotstepper"	5 weeks	
25 December	Headless Chickens	"George" / "Cruise Control"	4 weeks	

== 1995 ==
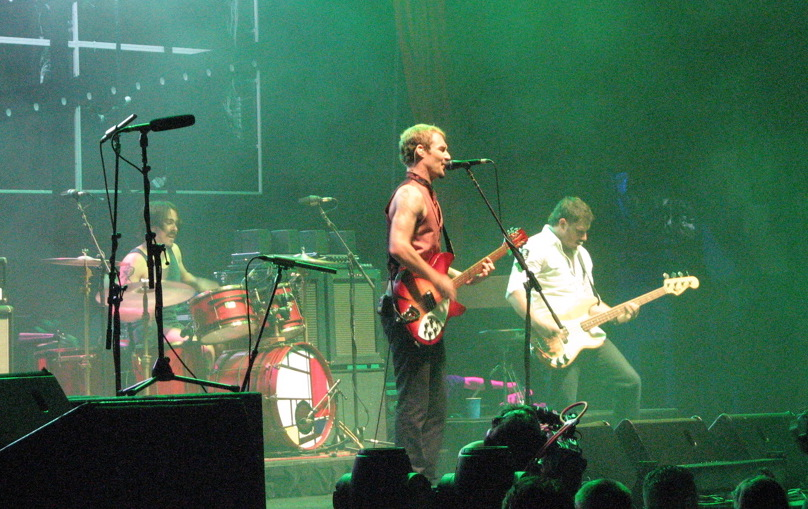
Australian rock band Silverchair peaked at number one on the New Zealand chart for three weeks with "Tomorrow".

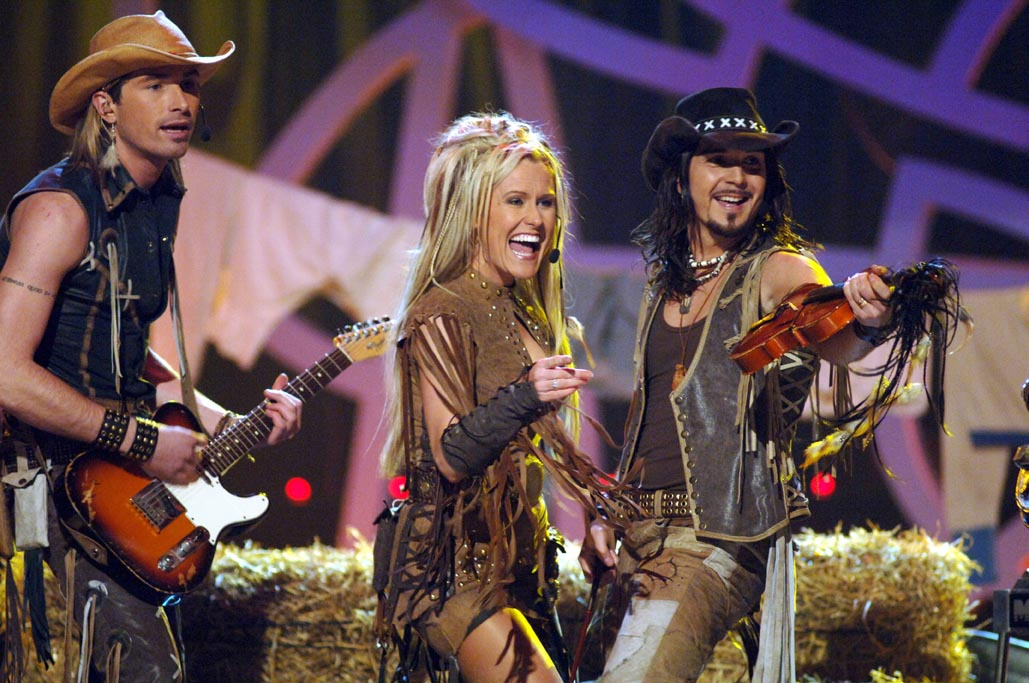
Rednex, under a different lineup, stayed at number one for six weeks with "Cotton Eye Joe" in March and April 1995.

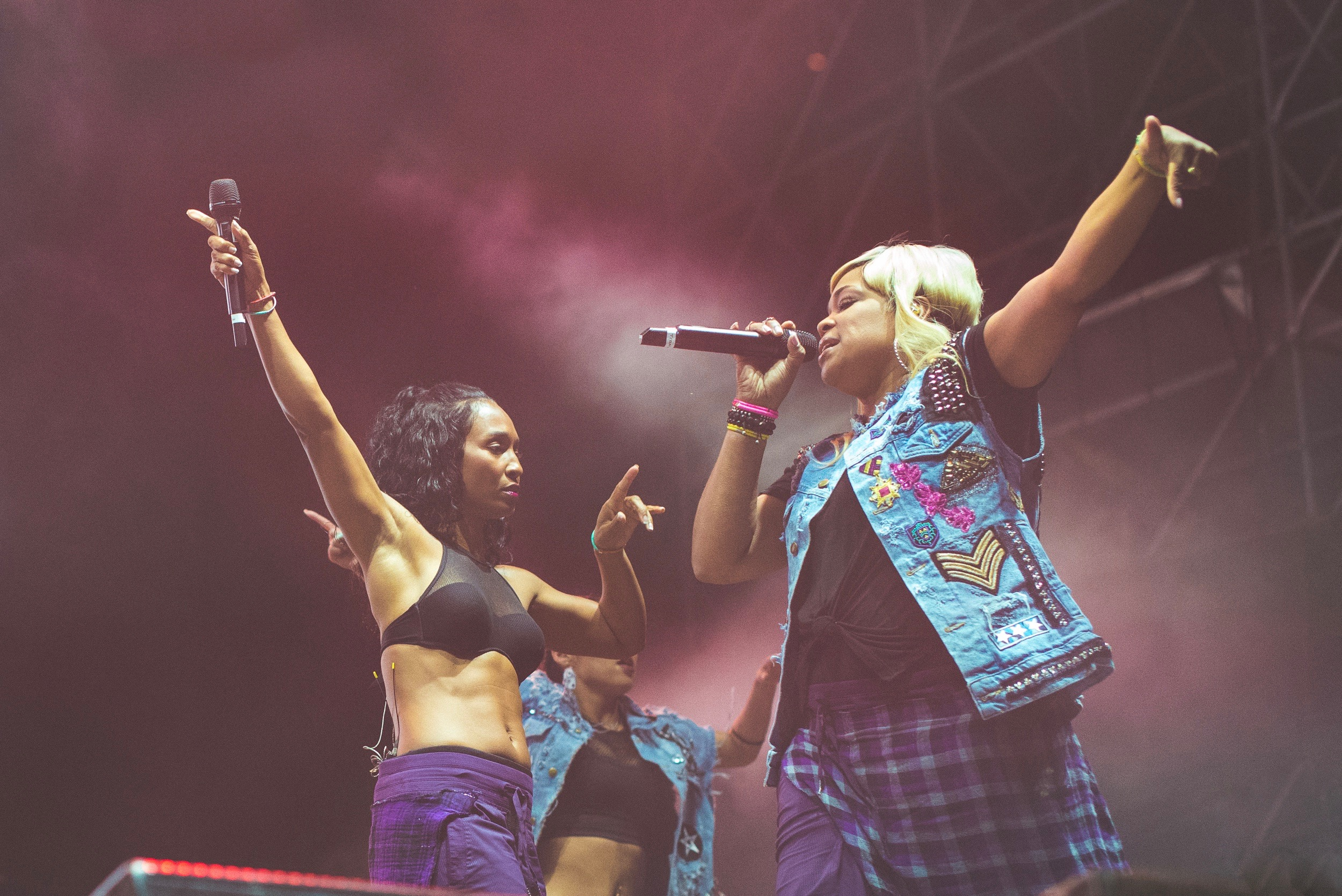
"Waterfalls" in 1995 in "No Scrubs" in 1999 were both number-one hits for American girl group TLC .

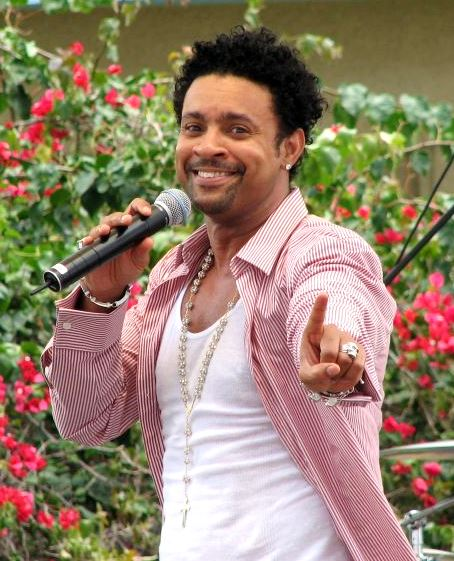
Jamaican musician Shaggy attained his first and sole number-one single in New Zealand with "Boombastic", which reached number one for two nonconsecutive weeks.

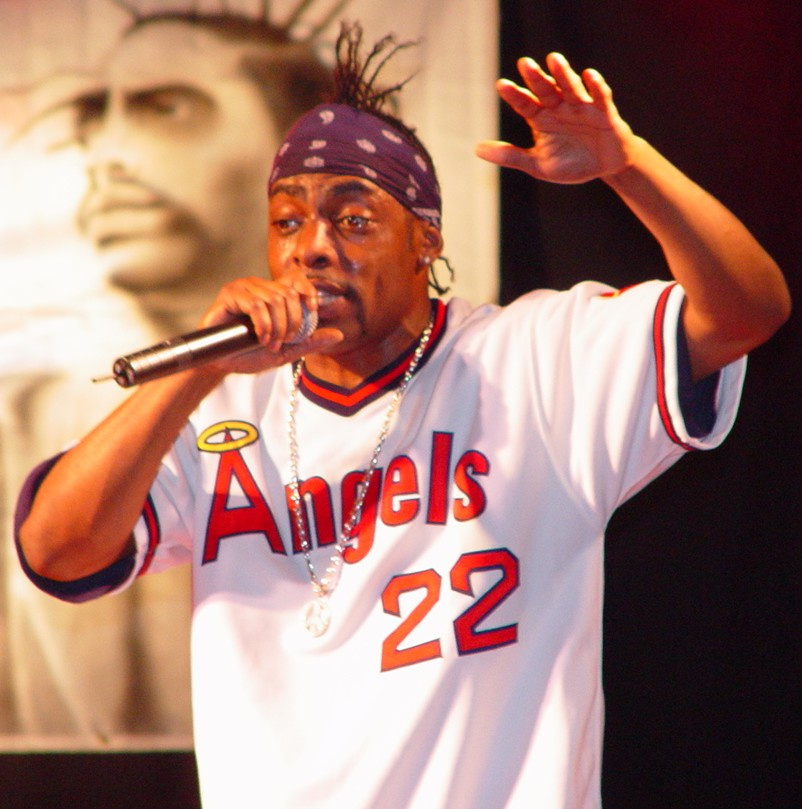
American rapper Coolio topped the New Zealand Singles Chart for nine weeks with "Gangsta's Paradise"; it was the third longest-running chart-topper during the 1990s in New Zealand.

Date	Artist	Single	Weeks at number one	Ref.
1 January	Headless Chickens	"George" / "Cruise Control"	4 weeks	
8 January	Headless Chickens	"George" / "Cruise Control"	4 weeks	
15 January	Ini Kamoze	"Here Comes the Hotstepper"	5 weeks	
22 January	Ini Kamoze	"Here Comes the Hotstepper"	5 weeks	
29 January	Ini Kamoze	"Here Comes the Hotstepper"	5 weeks	
5 February	Ini Kamoze	"Here Comes the Hotstepper"	5 weeks	
12 February	Silverchair	"Tomorrow"	3 weeks	
19 February	Silverchair	"Tomorrow"	3 weeks	
26 February	Silverchair	"Tomorrow"	3 weeks	
5 March	Rednex	"Cotton Eye Joe"	6 weeks	
12 March	Rednex	"Cotton Eye Joe"	6 weeks	
19 March	Rednex	"Cotton Eye Joe"	6 weeks	
26 March	Rednex	"Cotton Eye Joe"	6 weeks	
2 April	Rednex	"Cotton Eye Joe"	6 weeks	
9 April	Rednex	"Cotton Eye Joe"	6 weeks	
16 April	Brownstone	"If You Love Me"	5 weeks	
23 April	Brownstone	"If You Love Me"	5 weeks	
30 April	Brownstone	"If You Love Me"	5 weeks	
7 May	Brownstone	"If You Love Me"	5 weeks	
14 May	Brownstone	"If You Love Me"	5 weeks	
21 May	Janet Jackson	"Whoops Now" / "What'll I Do"	1 week	
28 May	Rappin' 4-Tay featuring the Spinners	"I'll Be Around"	3 weeks	
4 June	Rappin' 4-Tay featuring the Spinners	"I'll Be Around"	3 weeks	
11 June	Rappin' 4-Tay featuring the Spinners	"I'll Be Around"	3 weeks	
18 June	Michael Jackson and Janet Jackson	"Scream"	4 weeks	
25 June	Michael Jackson and Janet Jackson	"Scream"	4 weeks	
2 July	Michael Jackson and Janet Jackson	"Scream"	4 weeks	
9 July	Michael Jackson and Janet Jackson	"Scream"	4 weeks	
16 July	U2	"Hold Me, Thrill Me, Kiss Me, Kill Me"	1 week	
23 July	Portrait	"How Deep Is Your Love"	3 weeks	
30 July	Portrait	"How Deep Is Your Love"	3 weeks	
6 August	Portrait	"How Deep Is Your Love"	3 weeks	
13 August	TLC	"Waterfalls"	4 weeks	
20 August	TLC	"Waterfalls"	4 weeks	
27 August	TLC	"Waterfalls"	4 weeks	
3 September	TLC	"Waterfalls"	4 weeks	
10 September	Michael Jackson	"You Are Not Alone"	3 weeks	
17 September	Michael Jackson	"You Are Not Alone"	3 weeks	
24 September	Michael Jackson	"You Are Not Alone"	3 weeks	
1 October	Shaggy	"Boombastic"	2 weeks	
8 October	Mariah Carey	"Fantasy"	2 weeks	
15 October	Shaggy	"Boombastic"	2 weeks	
22 October	Mariah Carey	"Fantasy"	2 weeks	
29 October	Coolio featuring L.V.	"Gangsta's Paradise"	9 weeks	
5 November	Coolio featuring L.V.	"Gangsta's Paradise"	9 weeks	
12 November	Coolio featuring L.V.	"Gangsta's Paradise"	9 weeks	
19 November	Coolio featuring L.V.	"Gangsta's Paradise"	9 weeks	
26 November	Coolio featuring L.V.	"Gangsta's Paradise"	9 weeks	
3 December	Coolio featuring L.V.	"Gangsta's Paradise"	9 weeks	
10 December	Coolio featuring L.V.	"Gangsta's Paradise"	9 weeks	
17 December	Coolio featuring L.V.	"Gangsta's Paradise"	9 weeks	
24 December	Mariah Carey and Boyz II Men	"One Sweet Day"	4 weeks	
31 December	Mariah Carey and Boyz II Men	"One Sweet Day"	4 weeks	

== 1996 ==
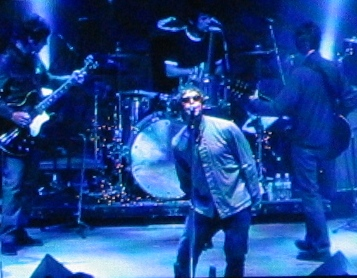
Britpop band Oasis reached number one for a single week with "Wonderwall".

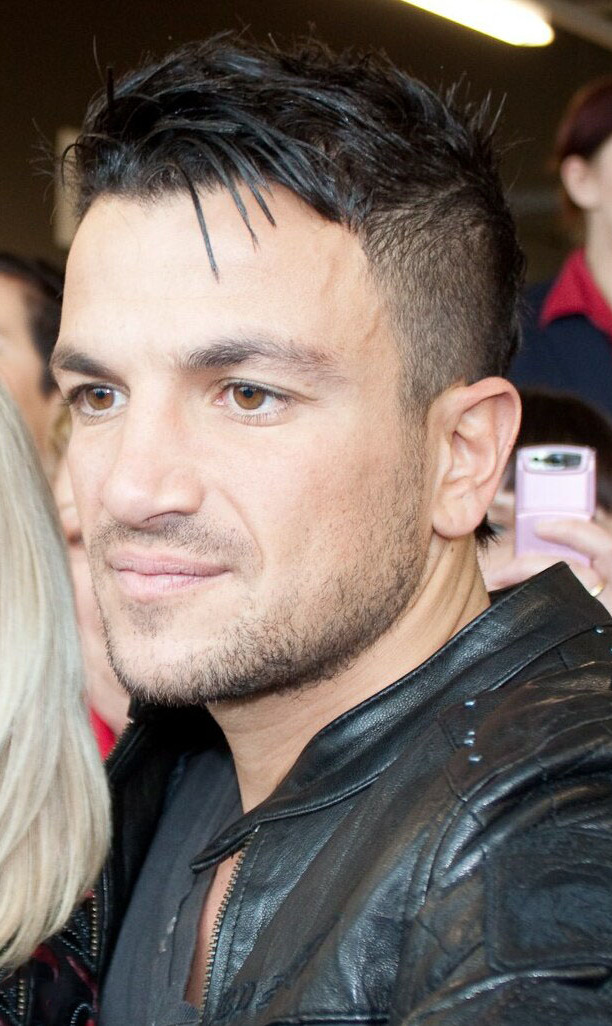
Peter Andre earned two different number-one singles two weeks apart: "Mysterious Girl" and "Get Down on It".

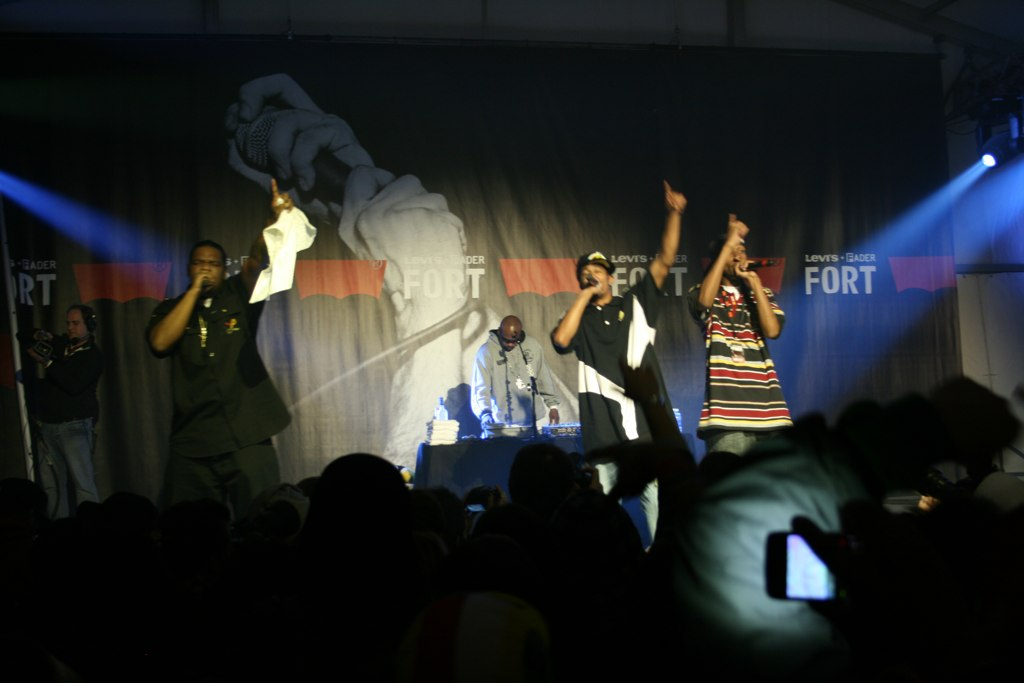
American hip hop group Bone Thugs-n-Harmony reached number one with "Tha Crossroads", which stayed at the top for six weeks and ended 1996 as the most successful single.

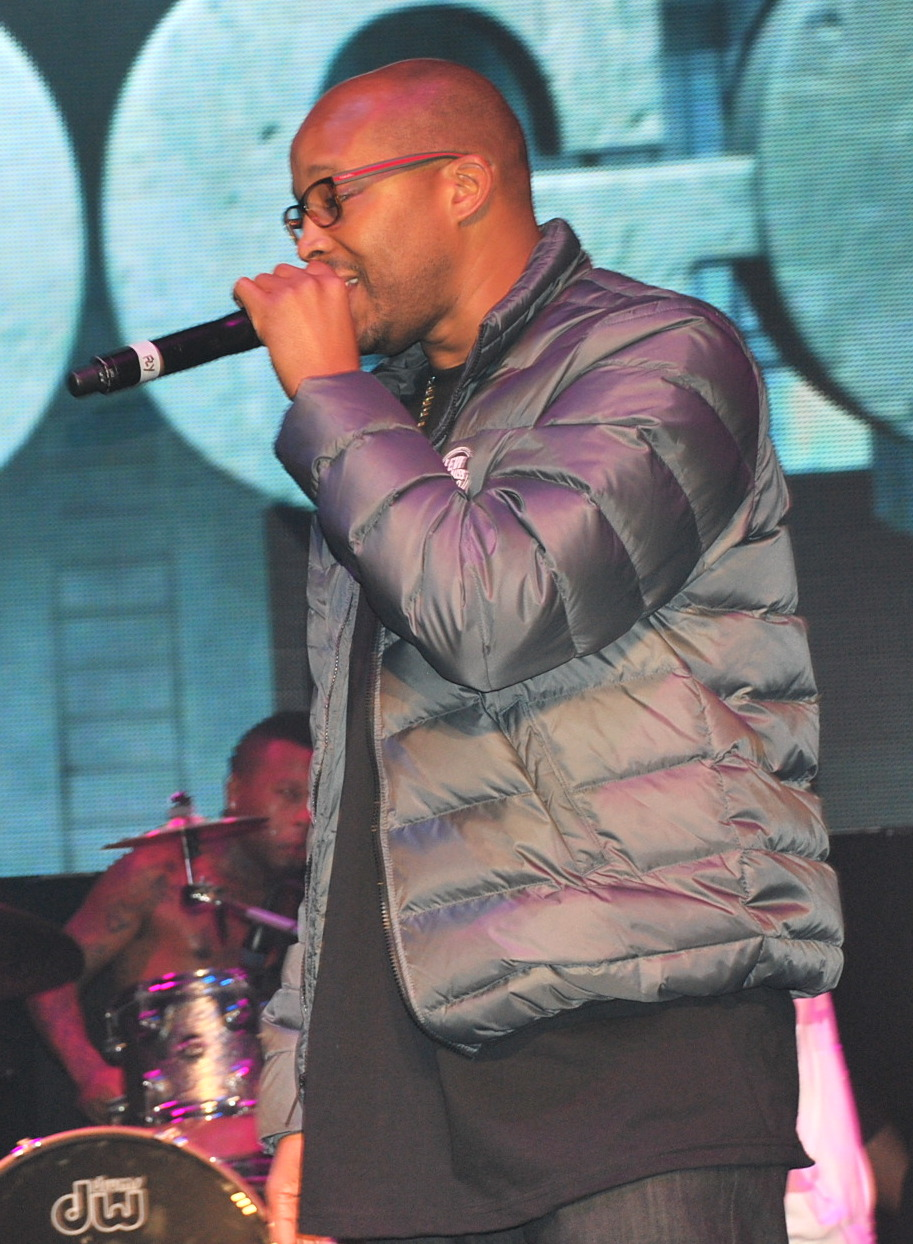
Warren G stayed at number one for four weeks with "What's Love Got to Do with It". In 1997, he earned his second number-one hit: "I Shot the Sheriff".

Date	Artist	Single	Weeks at number one	Ref.
7 January	Mariah Carey and Boyz II Men	"One Sweet Day"	4 weeks	
14 January	Coolio featuring L.V.	"Gangsta's Paradise"	9 weeks	
21 January	Mariah Carey and Boyz II Men	"One Sweet Day"	4 weeks	
28 January	OMC	"How Bizarre"	3 weeks	
4 February	OMC	"How Bizarre"	3 weeks	
11 February	OMC	"How Bizarre"	3 weeks	
18 February	CDB	"Let's Groove"	3 weeks	
25 February	CDB	"Let's Groove"	3 weeks	
3 March	CDB	"Let's Groove"	3 weeks	
10 March	Oasis	"Wonderwall"	1 week	
17 March	Peter Andre featuring Bubbler Ranx	"Mysterious Girl"	2 weeks	
24 March	Peter Andre featuring Bubbler Ranx	"Mysterious Girl"	2 weeks	
31 March	L.A.D.	"Ridin' Low"	2 weeks	
7 April	Peter Andre featuring Past to Present	"Get Down on It"	1 week	
14 April	L.A.D.	"Ridin' Low"	2 weeks	
21 April	CDB	"Hey Girl (This Is Our Time)"	1 week	
28 April	2Pac featuring Dr. Dre	"California Love"	5 weeks	
5 May	2Pac featuring Dr. Dre	"California Love"	5 weeks	
12 May	2Pac featuring Dr. Dre	"California Love"	5 weeks	
19 May	2Pac featuring Dr. Dre	"California Love"	5 weeks	
26 May	2Pac featuring Dr. Dre	"California Love"	5 weeks	
2 June	Fugees	"Killing Me Softly"	3 weeks	
9 June	Fugees	"Killing Me Softly"	3 weeks	
16 June	Fugees	"Killing Me Softly"	3 weeks	
23 June	Bone Thugs-n-Harmony	"Tha Crossroads"	6 weeks	
30 June	Bone Thugs-n-Harmony	"Tha Crossroads"	6 weeks	
7 July	Bone Thugs-n-Harmony	"Tha Crossroads"	6 weeks	
14 July	Bone Thugs-n-Harmony	"Tha Crossroads"	6 weeks	
21 July	Bone Thugs-n-Harmony	"Tha Crossroads"	6 weeks	
28 July	Bone Thugs-n-Harmony	"Tha Crossroads"	6 weeks	
4 August	DLT featuring Che Fu	"Chains"	5 weeks	
11 August	DLT featuring Che Fu	"Chains"	5 weeks	
18 August	DLT featuring Che Fu	"Chains"	5 weeks	
25 August	DLT featuring Che Fu	"Chains"	5 weeks	
1 September	DLT featuring Che Fu	"Chains"	5 weeks	
8 September	Keith Sweat	"Twisted"	6 weeks	
15 September	Keith Sweat	"Twisted"	6 weeks	
22 September	Keith Sweat	"Twisted"	6 weeks	
29 September	Keith Sweat	"Twisted"	6 weeks	
6 October	Keith Sweat	"Twisted"	6 weeks	
13 October	Keith Sweat	"Twisted"	6 weeks	
20 October	Warren G featuring Adina Howard	"What's Love Got to Do with It"	4 weeks	
27 October	Warren G featuring Adina Howard	"What's Love Got to Do with It"	4 weeks	
3 November	Warren G featuring Adina Howard	"What's Love Got to Do with It"	4 weeks	
10 November	Spice Girls	"Wannabe"	1 week	
17 November	Warren G featuring Adina Howard	"What's Love Got to Do with It"	4 weeks	
24 November	Blackstreet featuring Dr. Dre and Queen Pen	"No Diggity"	2 weeks	
1 December	Blackstreet featuring Dr. Dre and Queen Pen	"No Diggity"	2 weeks	
8 December	Fugees	"No Woman, No Cry"	2 weeks	
15 December	Fugees	"No Woman, No Cry"	2 weeks	
22 December	Mo Thugs	"Thug Devotion"	4 weeks	
29 December	Mo Thugs	"Thug Devotion"	4 weeks	

== 1997 ==
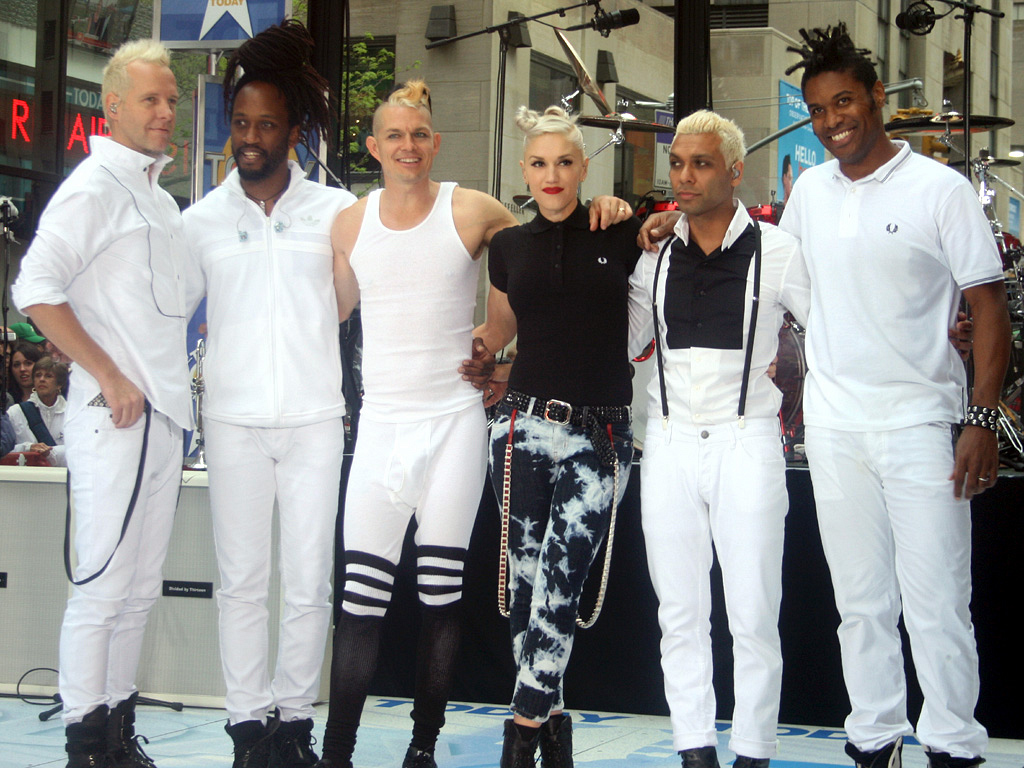
No Doubt's "Don't Speak" peaked at the summit of the New Zealand chart for three weeks.

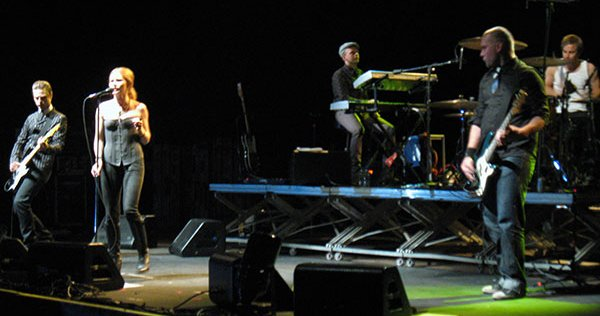
"Lovefool" by Swedish band the Cardigans remained at number one for two weeks in March 1997.

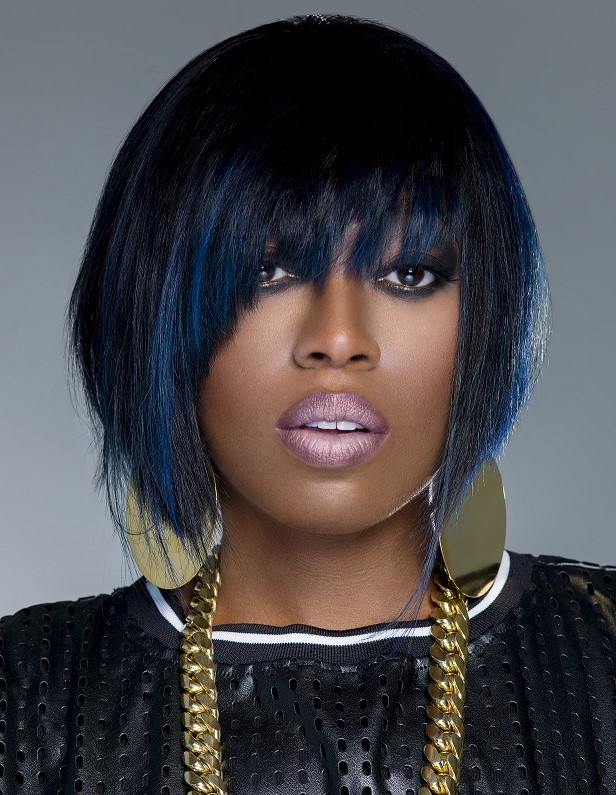
Despite not topping the New Zealand chart as a solo artist, Missy Elliott reached number one as a featured artist on two occasions: once with MC Lyte and another with SWV.

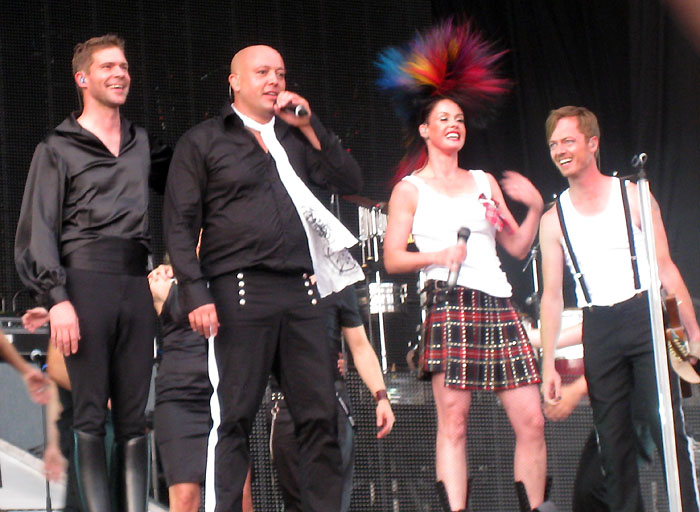
Danish band Aqua reached number one in New Zealand with their worldwide smash, "Barbie Girl".

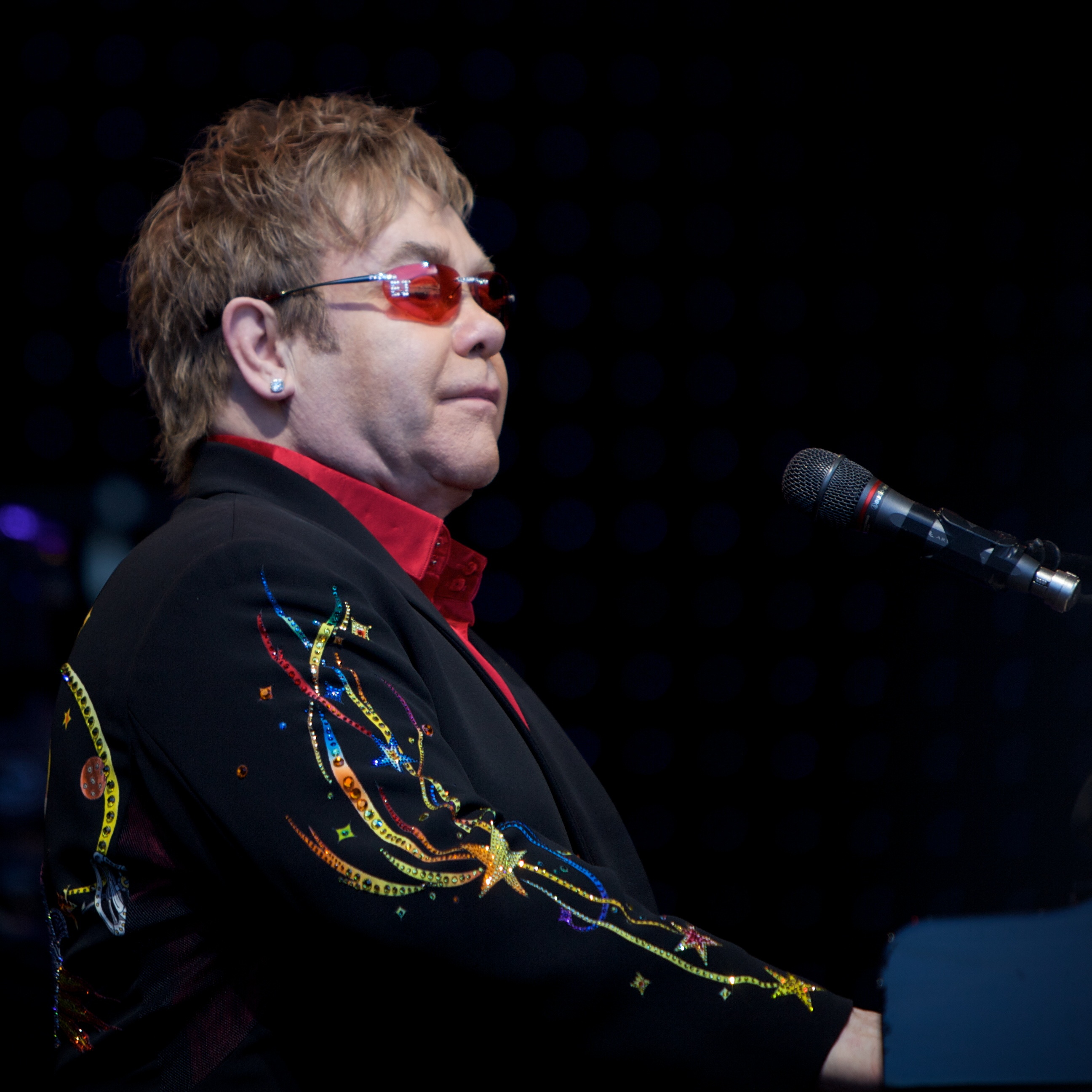
Elton John held the number-one position for six weeks with "Candle in the Wind 1997" / "Something About the Way You Look Tonight", New Zealand's most successful song of 1997.

Date	Artist	Single	Weeks at number one	Ref.
5 January	Mo Thugs	"Thug Devotion"	4 weeks	
12 January	Mo Thugs	"Thug Devotion"	4 weeks	
19 January	No Doubt	"Don't Speak"	3 weeks	
26 January	No Doubt	"Don't Speak"	3 weeks	
2 February	R. Kelly	"I Believe I Can Fly"	2 weeks	
9 February	No Doubt	"Don't Speak"	3 weeks	
16 February	R. Kelly	"I Believe I Can Fly"	2 weeks	
23 February	U2	"Discothèque"	1 week	
2 March	The Cardigans	"Lovefool"	2 weeks	
9 March	The Cardigans	"Lovefool"	2 weeks	
16 March	Unique II	"Break My Stride"	2 weeks	
23 March	MC Lyte featuring Missy Elliott	"Cold Rock a Party"	2 weeks	
30 March	Unique II	"Break My Stride"	2 weeks	
6 April	MC Lyte featuring Missy Elliott	"Cold Rock a Party"	2 weeks	
13 April	Warren G	"I Shot the Sheriff"	2 weeks	
20 April	Warren G	"I Shot the Sheriff"	2 weeks	
27 April	Az Yet featuring Peter Cetera	"Hard to Say I'm Sorry"	2 weeks	
4 May	Az Yet featuring Peter Cetera	"Hard to Say I'm Sorry"	2 weeks	
11 May	Blackstreet	"Don't Leave Me"	2 weeks	
18 May	Blackstreet	"Don't Leave Me"	2 weeks	
25 May	Michael Jackson	"Blood on the Dance Floor"	1 week	
1 June	Joose	"If Tomorrow Never Comes"	2 weeks	
8 June	Joose	"If Tomorrow Never Comes"	2 weeks	
15 June	SWV featuring Missy Elliott	"Can We"	1 week	
22 June	Hanson	"MMMBop"	2 weeks	
29 June	Hanson	"MMMBop"	2 weeks	
6 July	Puff Daddy and Faith Evans featuring 112	"I'll Be Missing You"	5 weeks	
13 July	Puff Daddy and Faith Evans featuring 112	"I'll Be Missing You"	5 weeks	
20 July	Puff Daddy and Faith Evans featuring 112	"I'll Be Missing You"	5 weeks	
27 July	Puff Daddy and Faith Evans featuring 112	"I'll Be Missing You"	5 weeks	
3 August	Puff Daddy and Faith Evans featuring 112	"I'll Be Missing You"	5 weeks	
10 August	Will Smith	"Men in Black"	5 weeks	
17 August	Will Smith	"Men in Black"	5 weeks	
24 August	Will Smith	"Men in Black"	5 weeks	
31 August	Will Smith	"Men in Black"	5 weeks	
7 September	Will Smith	"Men in Black"	5 weeks	
14 September	Aqua	"Barbie Girl"	2 weeks	
21 September	Aqua	"Barbie Girl"	2 weeks	
28 September	Chumbawamba	"Tubthumping"	1 week	
5 October	Elton John	"Candle in the Wind 1997"/ "Something About the Way You Look Tonight"	6 weeks	
12 October	Elton John	"Candle in the Wind 1997"/ "Something About the Way You Look Tonight"	6 weeks	
19 October	Elton John	"Candle in the Wind 1997"/ "Something About the Way You Look Tonight"	6 weeks	
26 October	Elton John	"Candle in the Wind 1997"/ "Something About the Way You Look Tonight"	6 weeks	
2 November	Elton John	"Candle in the Wind 1997"/ "Something About the Way You Look Tonight"	6 weeks	
9 November	Elton John	"Candle in the Wind 1997"/ "Something About the Way You Look Tonight"	6 weeks	
16 November	N-Trance featuring Rod Stewart	"Da Ya Think I'm Sexy?"	3 weeks	
23 November	N-Trance featuring Rod Stewart	"Da Ya Think I'm Sexy?"	3 weeks	
30 November	N-Trance featuring Rod Stewart	"Da Ya Think I'm Sexy?"	3 weeks	
7 December	Backstreet Boys	"As Long as You Love Me"	6 weeks	
14 December	Backstreet Boys	"As Long as You Love Me"	6 weeks	
21 December	Backstreet Boys	"As Long as You Love Me"	6 weeks	
28 December	Backstreet Boys	"As Long as You Love Me"	6 weeks	

== 1998 ==
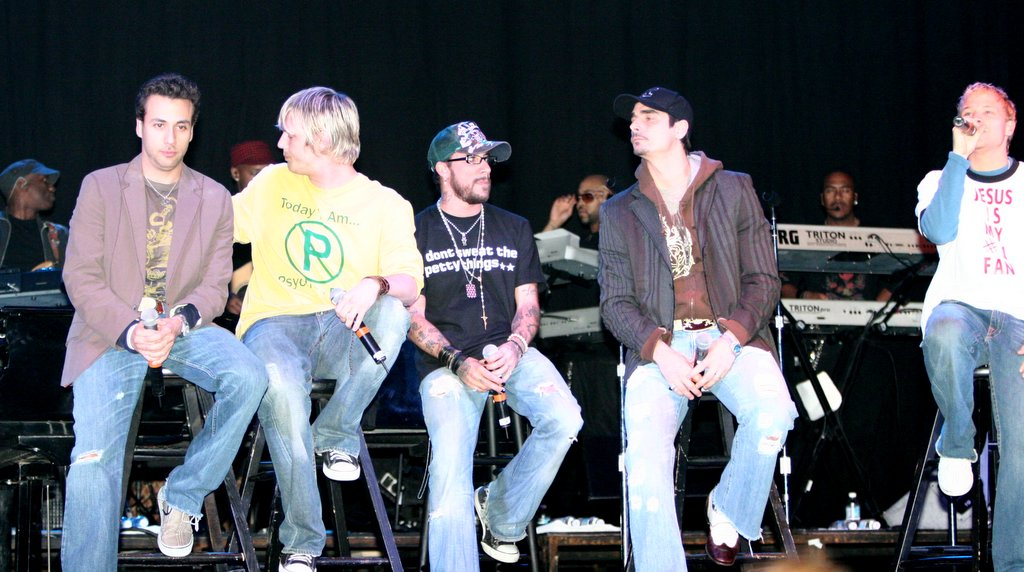
"As Long as You Love Me" and "I Want It That Way" by the Backstreet Boys reached number one in New Zealand.

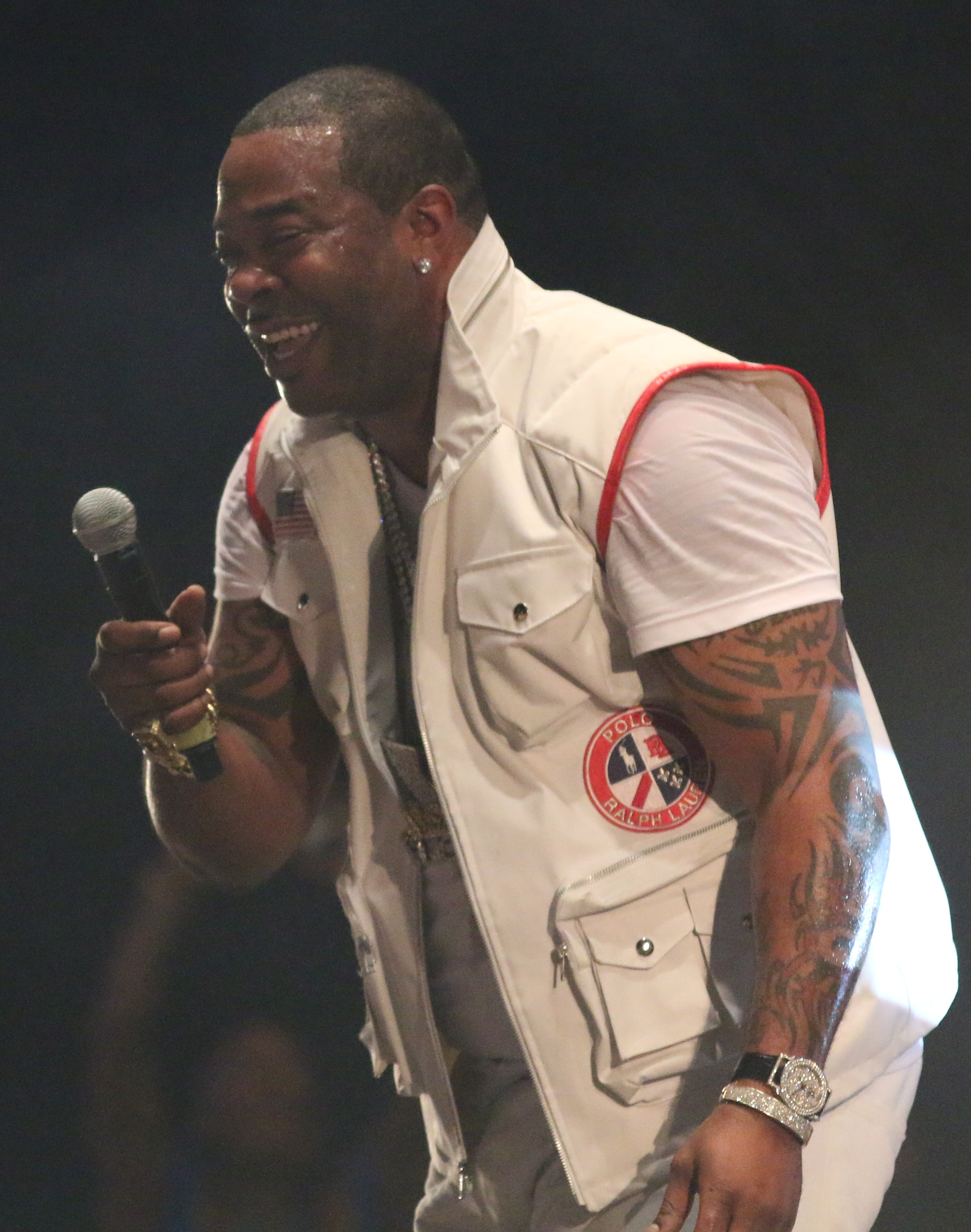
Busta Rhymes earned his first of two solo number-one singles in 1998 with "Turn It Up (Remix)/Fire It Up".

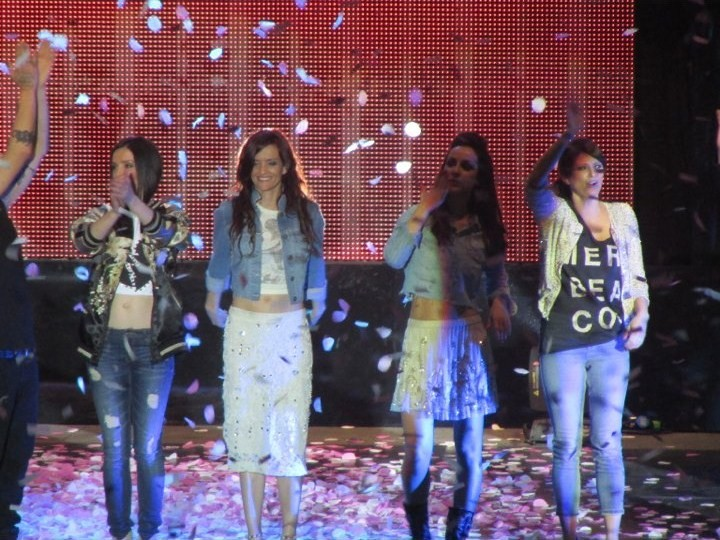
Irish girl group B*Witched climbed to number one twice in the 1990s with "C'est la Vie" and "Rollercoaster".

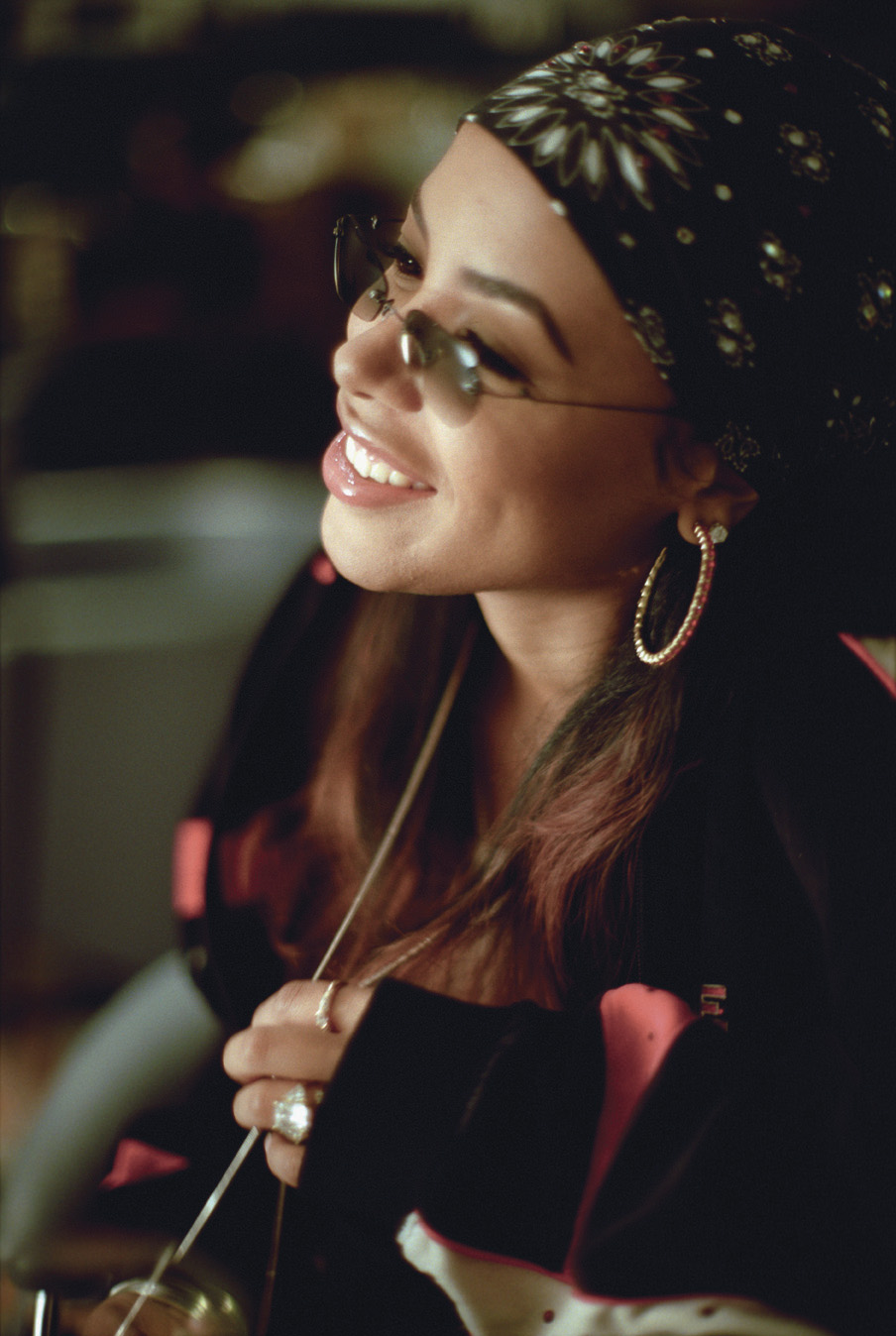
Aaliyah's "Are You That Somebody?" rose to number one in October 1998.

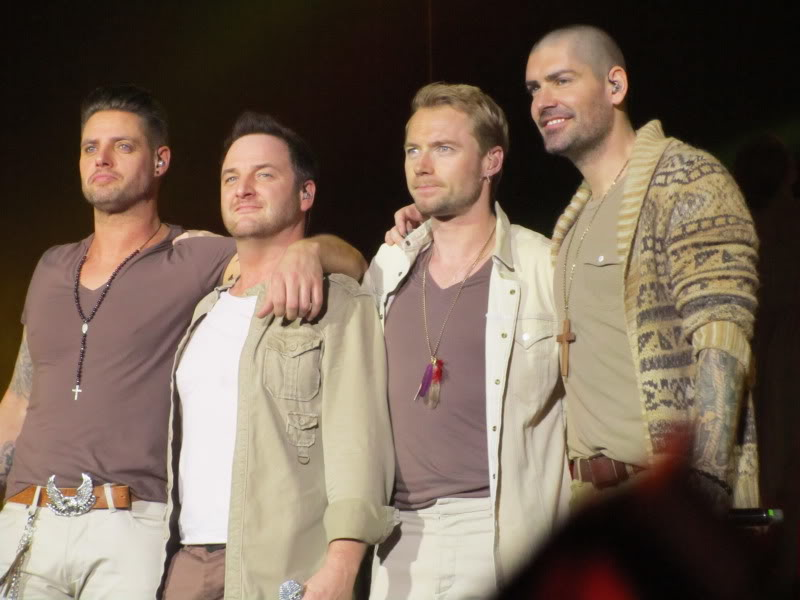
"No Matter What", "I Love the Way You Love Me", and "You Needed Me" gave Boyzone three number-one singles in New Zealand. Member Ronan Keating also peaked at number one in 1999 with "When You Say Nothing at All".

Date	Artist	Single	Weeks at number one	Ref.
4 January	Backstreet Boys	"As Long as You Love Me"	6 weeks	
11 January	Backstreet Boys	"As Long as You Love Me"	6 weeks	
18 January	All Saints	"Never Ever"	5 weeks	
25 January	All Saints	"Never Ever"	5 weeks	
1 February	All Saints	"Never Ever"	5 weeks	
8 February	All Saints	"Never Ever"	5 weeks	
15 February	All Saints	"Never Ever"	5 weeks	
22 February	Pappa Bear featuring Van der Toorn	"Cherish"	3 weeks	
1 March	Pappa Bear featuring Van der Toorn	"Cherish"	3 weeks	
8 March	Pappa Bear featuring Van der Toorn	"Cherish"	3 weeks	
15 March	Queen Pen featuring Eric Williams	"All My Love"	4 weeks	
22 March	Queen Pen featuring Eric Williams	"All My Love"	4 weeks	
29 March	Queen Pen featuring Eric Williams	"All My Love"	4 weeks	
5 April	Queen Pen featuring Eric Williams	"All My Love"	4 weeks	
12 April	K-Ci & JoJo	"All My Life"	4 weeks	
19 April	K-Ci & JoJo	"All My Life"	4 weeks	
26 April	K-Ci & JoJo	"All My Life"	4 weeks	
3 May	K-Ci & JoJo	"All My Life"	4 weeks	
10 May	Run–D.M.C. vs. Jason Nevins	"It's Like That"	2 weeks	
17 May	Run–D.M.C. vs. Jason Nevins	"It's Like That"	2 weeks	
24 May	Next	"Too Close"	2 weeks	
31 May	Next	"Too Close"	2 weeks	
7 June	Busta Rhymes	"Turn It Up (Remix)/Fire It Up"	3 weeks	
14 June	Busta Rhymes	"Turn It Up (Remix)/Fire It Up"	3 weeks	
21 June	Busta Rhymes	"Turn It Up (Remix)/Fire It Up"	3 weeks	
28 June	B*Witched	"C'est la Vie"	1 week	
5 July	Fred Dagg	"We Don't Know How Lucky We Are"	1 week	
12 July	Brandy and Monica	"The Boy Is Mine"	2 weeks	
19 July	Brandy and Monica	"The Boy Is Mine"	2 weeks	
26 July	Bus Stop featuring Carl Douglas	"Kung Fu Fighting"	2 weeks	
2 August	Bus Stop featuring Carl Douglas	"Kung Fu Fighting"	2 weeks	
9 August	Deep Obsession	"Lost in Love"	2 weeks	
16 August	Deep Obsession	"Lost in Love"	2 weeks	
23 August	Spice Girls	"Viva Forever"	2 weeks	
30 August	Spice Girls	"Viva Forever"	2 weeks	
6 September	Pras Michel featuring Ol' Dirty Bastard and Mýa	"Ghetto Supastar (That Is What You Are)"	4 weeks	
13 September	Pras Michel featuring Ol' Dirty Bastard and Mýa	"Ghetto Supastar (That Is What You Are)"	4 weeks	
20 September	Pras Michel featuring Ol' Dirty Bastard and Mýa	"Ghetto Supastar (That Is What You Are)"	4 weeks	
27 September	Pras Michel featuring Ol' Dirty Bastard and Mýa	"Ghetto Supastar (That Is What You Are)"	4 weeks	
4 October	Che Fu	"Without a Doubt" / "Machine Talk"	1 week	
11 October	Aaliyah	"Are You That Somebody?"	1 week	
18 October	Boyzone	"No Matter What"	6 weeks	
25 October	Boyzone	"No Matter What"	6 weeks	
1 November	B*Witched	"Rollercoaster"	1 week	
8 November	Boyzone	"No Matter What"	6 weeks	
15 November	Five	"Everybody Get Up"	1 week	
22 November	Boyzone	"No Matter What"	6 weeks	
29 November	Boyzone	"No Matter What"	6 weeks	
6 December	Boyzone	"No Matter What"	6 weeks	
13 December	Jennifer Paige	"Crush"	1 week	
20 December	Spice Girls	"Goodbye"	3 weeks	
27 December	Spice Girls	"Goodbye"	3 weeks	

== 1999 ==
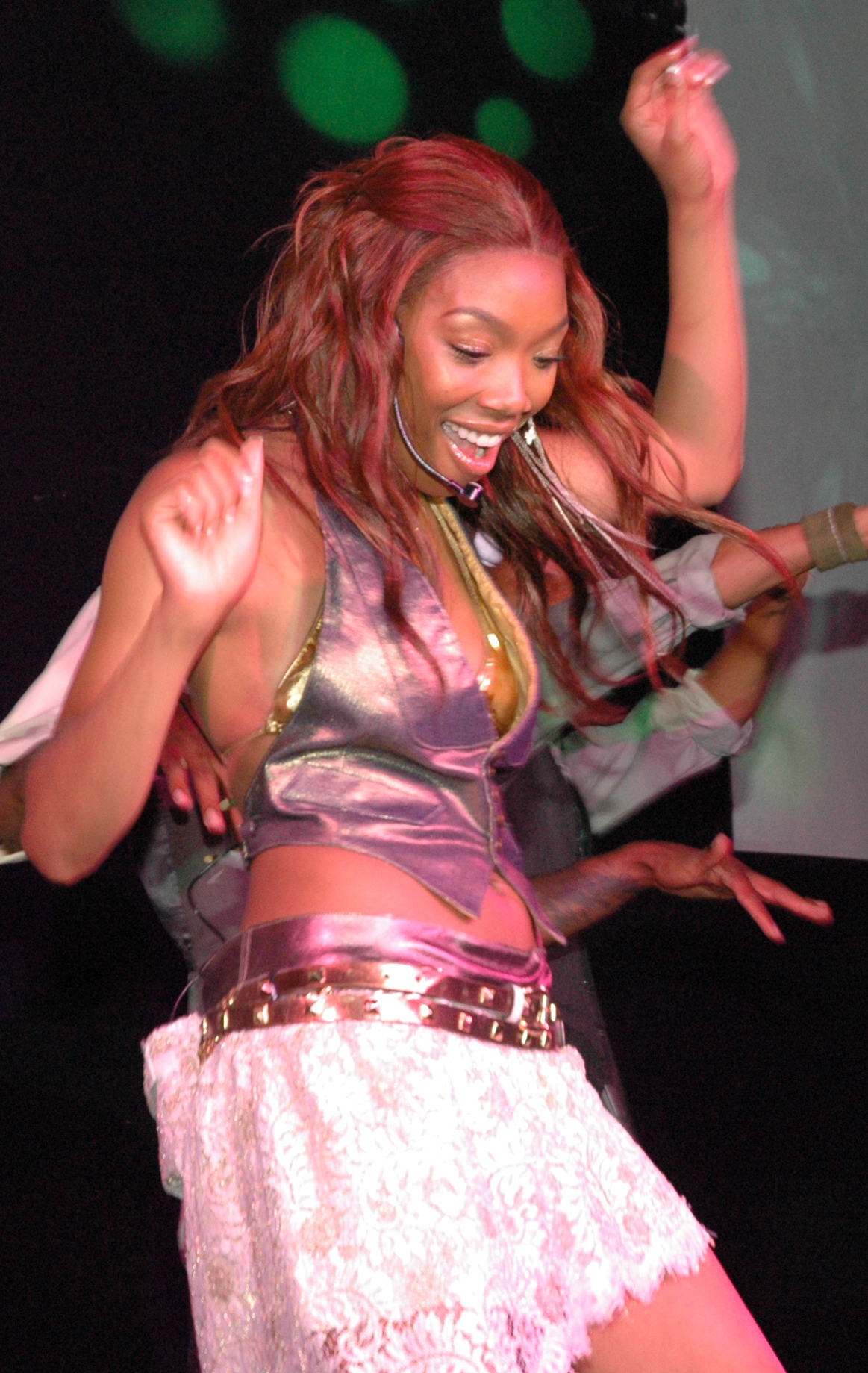
R&B singer Brandy Norwood spent a total of three weeks at number one with "The Boy Is Mine" in 1998 "Have You Ever?" in 1999.

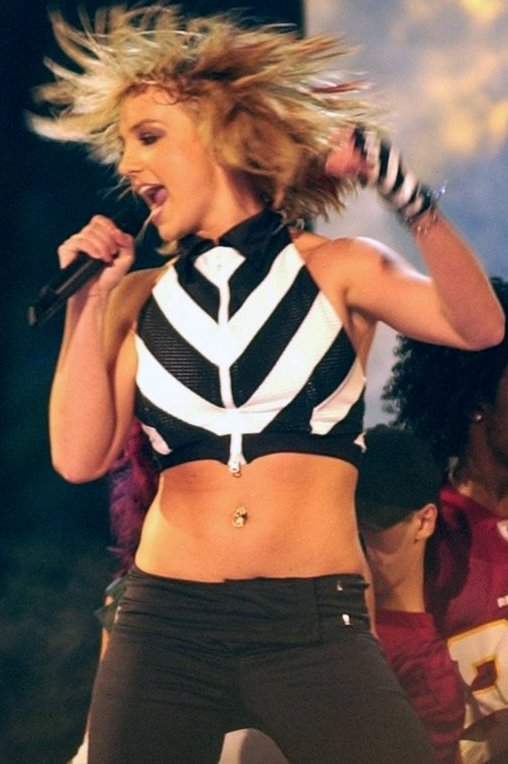
"...Baby One More Time" and "Sometimes" gave Britney Spears her first two New Zealand number ones.

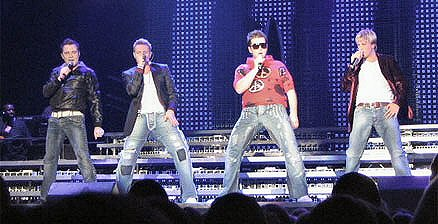
Boy band Westlife had a number-one hit with "Swear It Again".

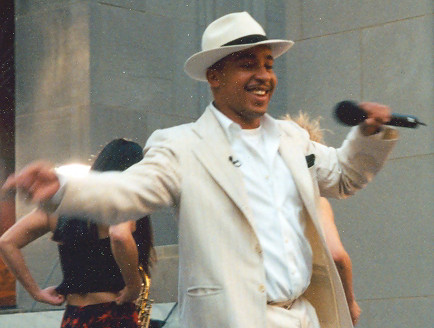
Lou Bega's cover of "Mambo No. 5" topped the New Zealand chart for six nonconsecutive weeks.

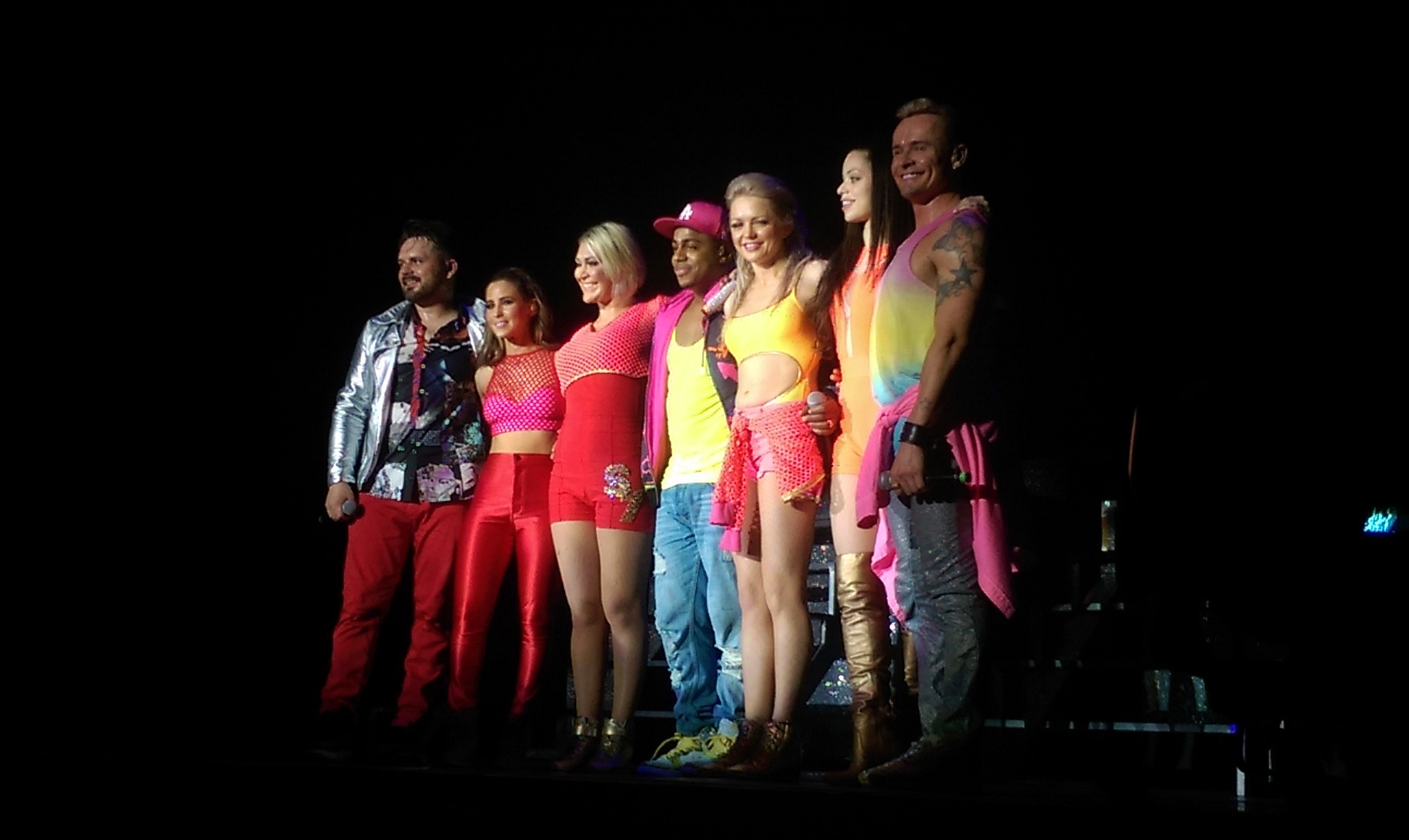
S Club 7 obtained two of their three New Zealand number-one hits in 1999: "Bring It All Back" and "S Club Party".

Date	Artist	Single	Weeks at number one	Ref.
3 January	Spice Girls	"Goodbye"	3 weeks	
10 January	Cher	"Believe"	1 week	
17 January	Blackstreet and Mýa featuring Mase and Blinky Blink	"Take Me There"	3 weeks	
24 January	Blackstreet and Mýa featuring Mase and Blinky Blink	"Take Me There"	3 weeks	
31 January	Blackstreet and Mýa featuring Mase and Blinky Blink	"Take Me There"	3 weeks	
7 February	Brandy	"Have You Ever?"	1 week	
14 February	Ardijah	"Silly Love Songs"	1 week	
21 February	Britney Spears	"...Baby One More Time"	4 weeks	
28 February	Britney Spears	"...Baby One More Time"	4 weeks	
7 March	New Radicals	"You Get What You Give"	1 week	
14 March	Lutricia McNeal	"My Side of Town"	1 week	
21 March	Britney Spears	"...Baby One More Time"	4 weeks	
28 March	Steps	"Heartbeat" / "Tragedy"	1 week	
4 April	Boyzone	"I Love the Way You Love Me"	2 weeks	
11 April	Boyzone	"I Love the Way You Love Me"	2 weeks	
18 April	Britney Spears	"...Baby One More Time"	4 weeks	
25 April	TLC	"No Scrubs"	2 weeks	
2 May	Shania Twain	"That Don't Impress Me Much"	1 week	
9 May	TLC	"No Scrubs"	2 weeks	
16 May	TrueBliss	"Tonight"	2 weeks	
23 May	TrueBliss	"Tonight"	2 weeks	
30 May	Geri Halliwell	"Look at Me"	1 week	
6 June	Backstreet Boys	"I Want It That Way"	2 weeks	
13 June	Backstreet Boys	"I Want It That Way"	2 weeks	
20 June	Ricky Martin	"Livin' la Vida Loca"	1 week	
27 June	Boyzone	"You Needed Me"	2 weeks	
4 July	Boyzone	"You Needed Me"	2 weeks	
11 July	Deep Obsession	"Cold"	1 week	
18 July	Britney Spears	"Sometimes"	1 week	
25 July	Westlife	"Swear It Again"	1 week	
1 August	Jennifer Lopez	"If You Had My Love"	1 week	
8 August	Vengaboys	"Boom, Boom, Boom, Boom!!"	1 week	
15 August	Shania Twain	"Man! I Feel Like a Woman!"	1 week	
22 August	Five	"If Ya Gettin' Down"	1 week	
29 August	Whitney Houston	"My Love Is Your Love"	1 week	
5 September	Ronan Keating	"When You Say Nothing at All"	1 week	
12 September	Lou Bega	"Mambo No. 5 (A Little Bit Of...)"	6 weeks	
19 September	Lou Bega	"Mambo No. 5 (A Little Bit Of...)"	6 weeks	
26 September	Lou Bega	"Mambo No. 5 (A Little Bit Of...)"	6 weeks	
3 October	Neil Finn	"Can You Hear Us"	1 week	
10 October	S Club 7	"Bring It All Back"	1 week	
17 October	Lou Bega	"Mambo No. 5 (A Little Bit Of...)"	6 weeks	
24 October	Lou Bega	"Mambo No. 5 (A Little Bit Of...)"	6 weeks	
31 October	Mariah Carey featuring Jay-Z	"Heartbreaker"	1 week	
7 November	Lou Bega	"Mambo No. 5 (A Little Bit Of...)"	6 weeks	
14 November	Eiffel 65	"Blue (Da Ba Dee)"	1 week	
21 November	Deep Obsession	"One & Only"	2 weeks	
28 November	Deep Obsession	"One & Only"	2 weeks	
5 December	Bob Marley featuring Lauryn Hill	"Turn Your Lights Down Low"	2 weeks	
12 December	Shaft	"(Mucho Mambo) Sway"	1 week	
19 December	Bob Marley featuring Lauryn Hill	"Turn Your Lights Down Low"	2 weeks	
26 December	S Club 7	"S Club Party"	5 weeks (4 in 2000)	

== Artists with the most number-one songs ==
Key

† – Song of New Zealand origin

Artist	Number-one singles	Longest run	Total weeks at number one
Michael Jackson	6	"Black or White" (8 weeks)	22
Mariah Carey	7	"I'll Be There"; "Endless Love" (with Luther Vandross) (5 weeks each)	20
Boyz II Men	4	"End of the Road" (7 weeks)	17
Boyzone^{1}	3	"No Matter What" (6 weeks)	10
Blackstreet	3	"Take Me There" (with Mýa featuring Mase and Blinky Blink) (3 weeks)	7
Janet Jackson	3	"Scream" (with Michael Jackson) (4 weeks)	7
Spice Girls^{2}	3	"Goodbye" (3 weeks)	6
Deep Obsession	3	"Lost in Love"; "One & Only" (2 weeks each)	5
U2	3	"The Fly" (3 weeks)	5

Excluded statistics

1 Boyzone's tally does not include Ronan Keating's solo single, "When You Say Nothing At All".
2 The Spice Girls' tally does not include Geri Halliwell's solo single, "Look At Me".
- While some artists made appearances in other artists songs, these songs were not included in their groups tally. This includes, Robin and Ali Campbell featuring in Pato Banton's single, "Baby Come Back" as they were featured together, not as part of UB40.
*Some artists who had solo number-one singles (or was a featured artist in a number-one single) and who were also part of a group that had number-one single(s) have been classed as separate entries. This includes Che Fu, who had one solo number-one and featured in another number-one single, and Supergroove, who had one a number-one single prior to Che Fu leaving the group, as well as Lauryn Hill and Pras Michel, who both had a solo number one single, and the Fugees, which had two number-one singles prior to the release of their solo singles.

== Most weeks at number one ==
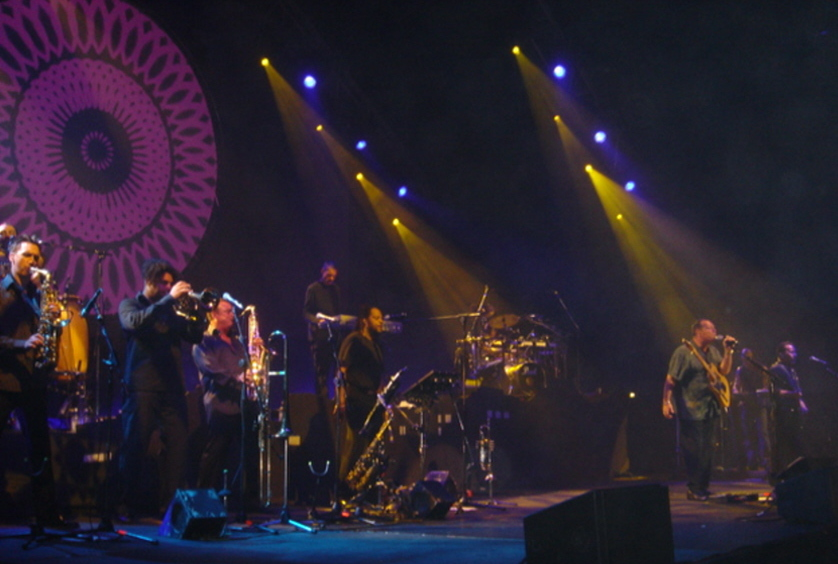
Reggae group UB40 had an eleven-week stay at number one with "(I Can't Help) Falling in Love with You" in 1993.

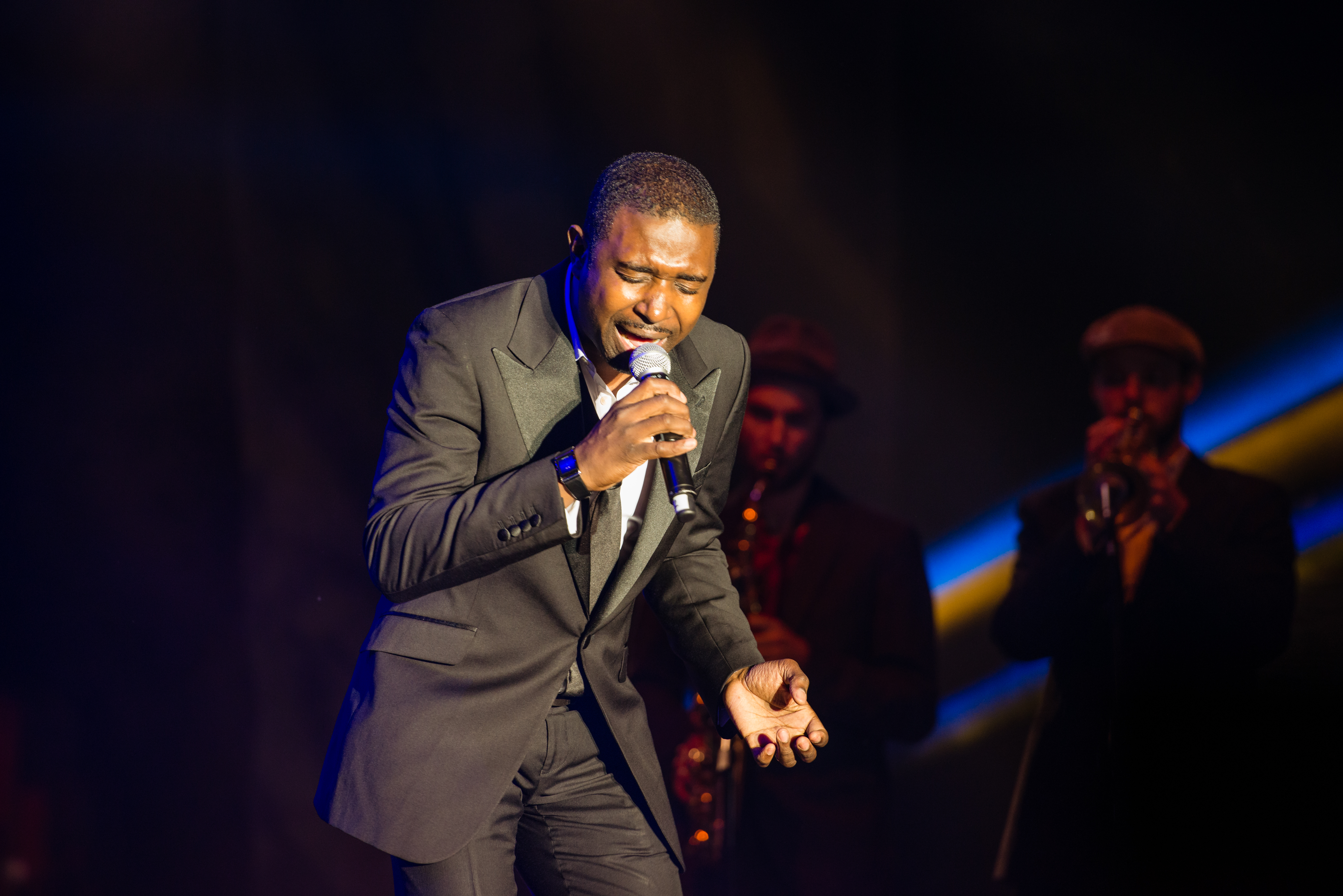
"It Keeps Rainin' (Tears from My Eyes)" by Bitty McLean held the number-one spot for eight weeks in 1993 and 1994.

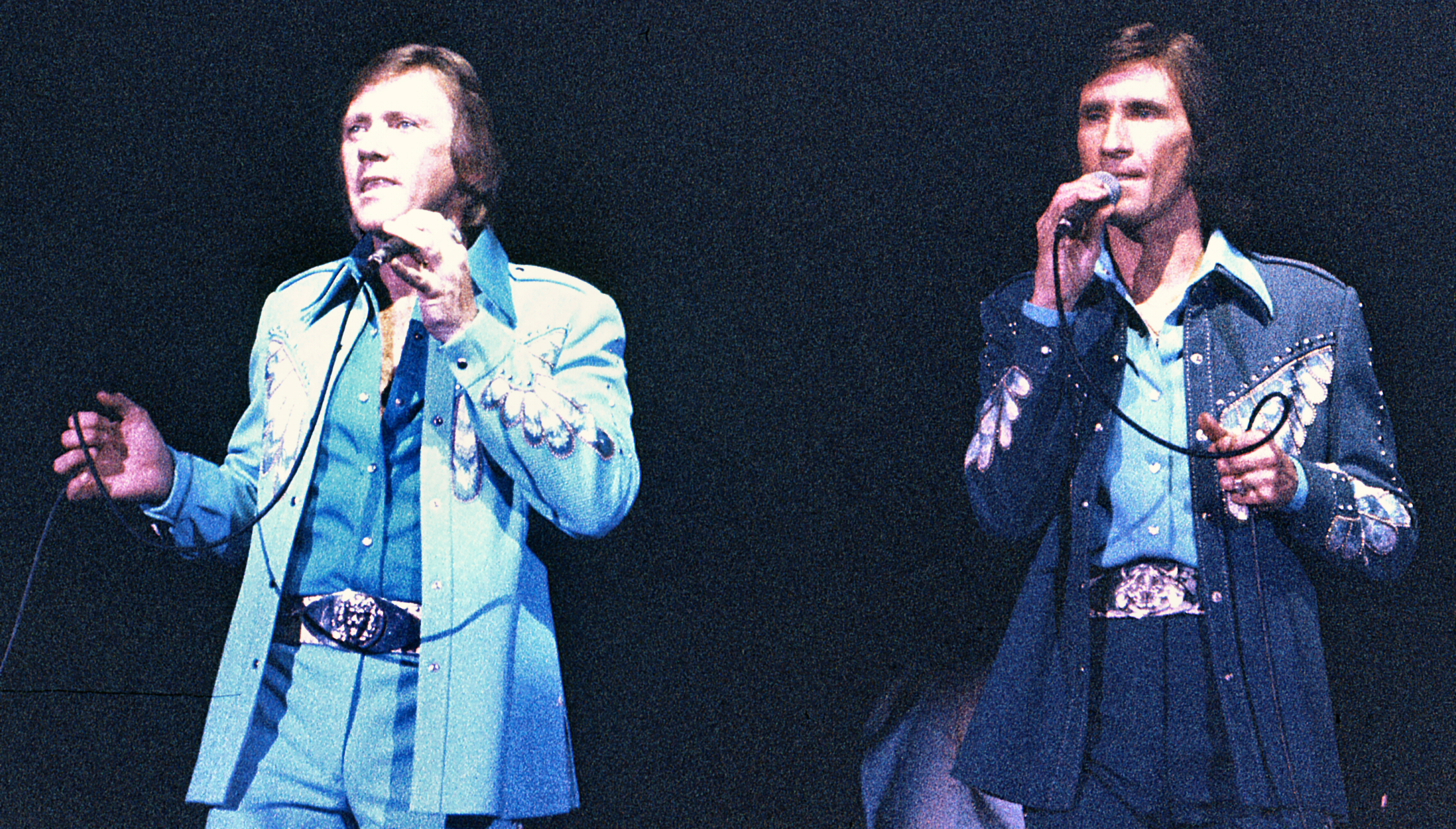
After being featured in the 1990 film Ghost, the Righteous Brothers' version of "Unchained Melody" was re-released and topped the New Zealand chart for seven weeks.

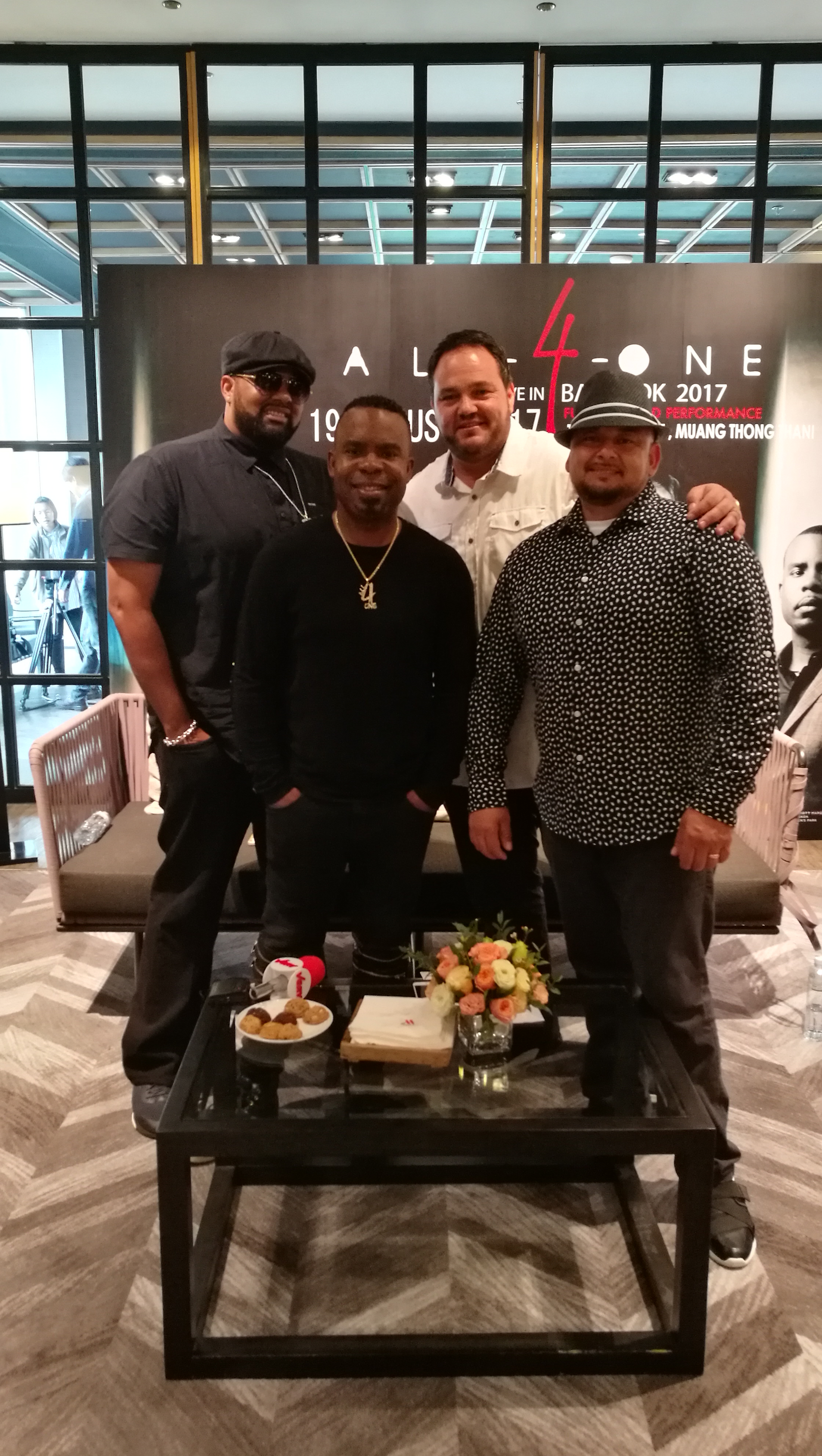
All-4-One topped the New Zealand chart for six weeks with their cover of "I Swear".

Key

† – Song of New Zealand origin

Title	Artist	Reached number one	Weeks at number one
"I Will Always Love You"	Whitney Houston	20 December 1992	14
"(I Can't Help) Falling in Love with You"	UB40	13 June 1993	11
"Gangsta's Paradise"	Coolio featuring L.V.	29 October 1995	9
"(Everything I Do) I Do It for You"	Bryan Adams	18 August 1991	8
"Black or White"	Michael Jackson	24 November 1991	8
"It Keeps Rainin' (Tears from My Eyes)"	Bitty McLean	28 November 1993	7
"End of the Road"	Boyz II Men	18 October 1992	7
"Unchained Melody"	The Righteous Brothers	24 February 1991	7
"Ice Ice Baby"	Vanilla Ice	9 December 1990	7
"I Swear"	All-4-One	10 September 1994	6
"As Long as You Love Me"	Backstreet Boys	7 December 1997	6
"Achy Breaky Heart"	Billy Ray Cyrus	6 September 1992	6
"Tha Crossroads"	Bone Thugs-n-Harmony	23 June 1996	6
"No Matter What"	Boyzone	18 October 1998	6
"Candle in the Wind 1997" / "Something About the Way You Look Tonight"	Elton John	5 October 1997	6
"I Can See Clearly Now"	Jimmy Cliff	16 January 1994	6
"Twisted"	Keith Sweat	8 September 1996	6
"Mambo No. 5 (A Little Bit Of...)"	Lou Bega	12 September 1999	6
"U Can't Touch This"	MC Hammer	27 July 1990	6
"Trippin'"	Push Push	14 April 1991	6
"Cotton Eye Joe"	Rednex	5 March 1995	6
"To Sir with Love"	Ngaire	28 October 1990	5
"California Love"	2Pac featuring Dr. Dre	28 April 1996	5
"The Sign"	Ace of Base	24 April 1994	5
"Never Ever"	All Saints	18 January 1998	5
"If You Love Me"	Brownstone	16 April 1995	5
"Chains"	DLT featuring Che Fu	28 July 1996	5
"Tears in Heaven"	Eric Clapton	10 May 1992	5
"Here Comes the Hotstepper"	Ini Kamoze	18 December 1994	5
"Endless Love"	Luther Vandross and Mariah Carey	9 October 1994	5
"I'll Be There"	Mariah Carey featuring Trey Lorenz	19 July 1992	5
"I'd Do Anything for Love (But I Won't Do That)"	Meat Loaf	26 September 1993	5
"To Be with You"	Mr. Big	22 March 1992	5
"I'll Be Missing You"	Puff Daddy and Faith Evans featuring 112	6 July 1997	5
"Nothing Compares 2 U"	Sinéad O'Connor	8 April 1990	5
"Men in Black"	Will Smith	10 August 1997	5

== See also ==
- Music of New Zealand
- List of UK Singles Chart number ones of the 1990s
- List of Billboard number-one singles
- List of number-one singles in Australia during the 1990s
