= Air Supply discography =

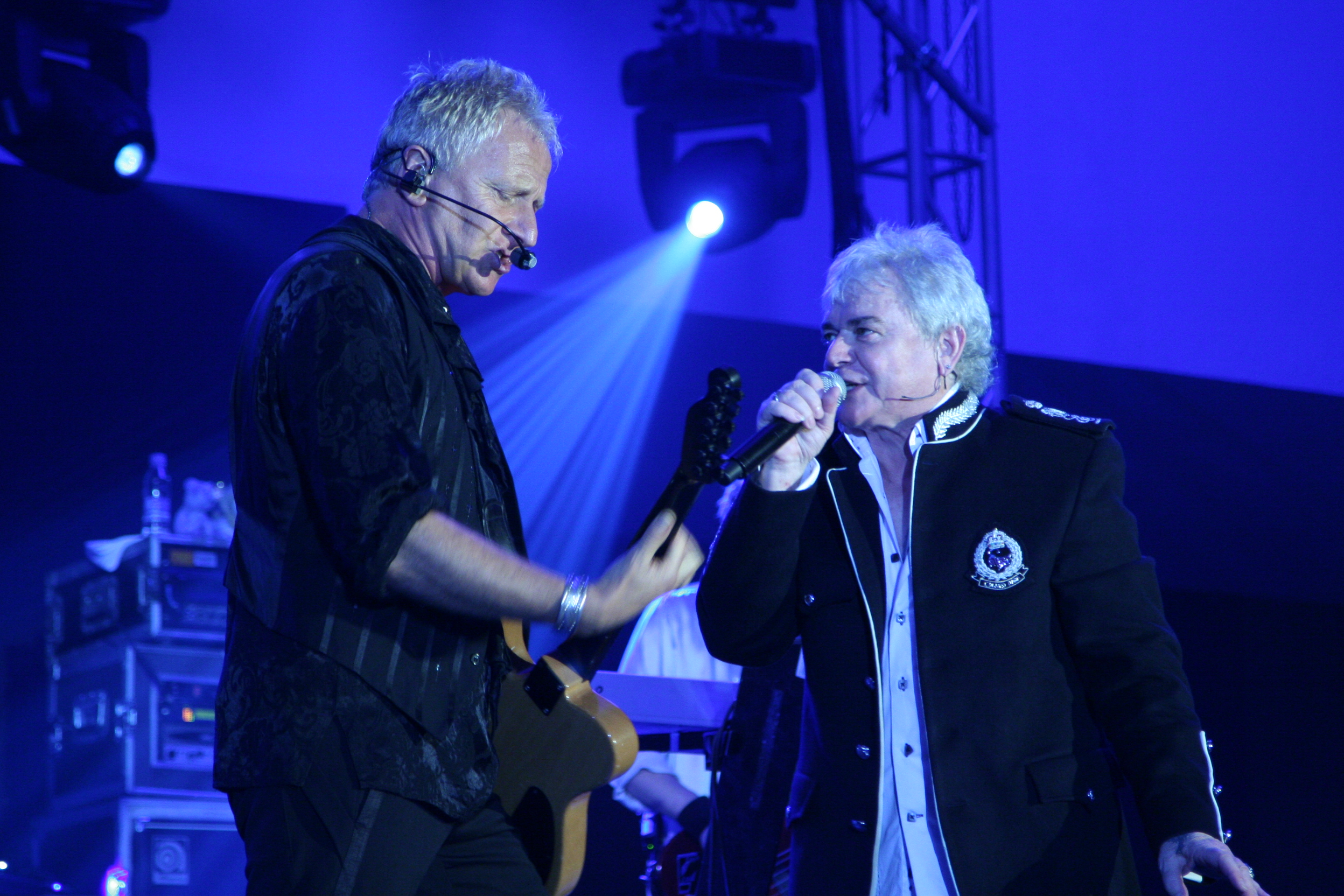
- Air Supply performing in the Philippines
- Studio albums: 17
- Live albums: 4
- Compilation albums: 13
- Singles: 27

Air Supply are a British-Australian soft rock duo formed in Melbourne in 1975. They have released 17 studio albums, 13 compilation albums, 4 live albums and 27 singles.

== Albums ==
=== Studio albums ===
Year	Album details	Peak chart positions			Certifications (sales thresholds)
Year	Album details	AUS	NZL	US	Certifications (sales thresholds)
1976	Air Supply: Released: December 1976; Label: CBS, Australian Record Company, Rainbow; Format: LP, cassette, CD	17	—N/a	—N/a	AUS: Gold
1977	The Whole Thing's Started: Released: 28 July 1977; Label: CBS (SBP 234999), Epic, Sony; Format: LP, cassette, CD	32	—N/a	—N/a	
1978	Love & Other Bruises: Released: 1978; Label: Columbia (PC 35047); Format: LP, cassette, CD	—N/a	—	—	
1979	Life Support: Released: April 1979; Label: Wizard, Big Time, EMI; Format: LP, cassette, CD	27	—	—	
1980	Lost in Love: Released: 3 March 1980; Label: K.M. Music (KMH-81002), Arista (202,317, 402,317); Format: LP, 8-track, cassette, CD	21	22	22	MC: 3× Platinum; RIAA: 2× Platinum
1981	The One That You Love: Released: May 1981; Label: Big Time, Arista (AL 9551), EMI; Format: LP, 8-track, cassette, CD	10	—	10	AUS: Platinum; MC: 2× Platinum; RIAA: Platinum
1982	Now and Forever: Released: June 1982; Label: Big Time, Arista (AL 9587), EMI; Format: LP, 8-track, cassette, CD	27	46	25	MC: Platinum; RIAA: Platinum
1985	Air Supply: Released: February 1985; Label: BMG, Arista (AL8-8283); Format: LP, cassette, CD	88	—	26	MC: Gold; RIAA: Gold
1986	Hearts in Motion: Released: August 1986; Label: BMG, Arista (AL9-8426); Format: LP, cassette, CD	—	—	84	
1987	The Christmas Album: Released: November 1987; Label: BMG, Arista (AL9-8528); Format: LP, cassette, CD	—	—	—	
1991	The Earth Is ...: Released: 23 July 1991; Label: Warner, Giant (24426); Format: LP, cassette, CD	—	—	—	
1993	The Vanishing Race: Released: 11 May 1993; Label: Warner, Giant (9 24494-2); Format: LP, cassette, CD	—	—	—	
1995	News from Nowhere: Released: 11 April 1995; Label: Warner, Giant; Format: LP, cassette, CD	—	—	—	
1997	The Book of Love: Released: 9 December 1997; Label: Giant; Format: CD, cassette	—	—	—	
2001	Yours Truly: Released: 12 June 2001; Label: Giant; Format: CD, cassette	—	—	—	
2003	Across the Concrete Sky: Released: 22 July 2003; Label: A Nice Pear; Format: CD, cassette	—	—	—	
2010	Mumbo Jumbo: Released: 4 May 2010; Label: Odds On; Format: CD	—	—	—	
2026	A Matter of Time: Released: 25 February 2026; Label: Air Supply Music; Format: Digital	—	—	—	
"—" denotes releases that did not chart.

=== Live albums ===
Year	Album details	Peak chart positions
Year	Album details	AUS
1995	Greatest Hits Live ... Now and Forever: Released: 1995; Label: Warner Bros.; Format: CD	60
2005	All Out of Love Live: Released: 2005; Label: Cleopatra; Format: CD	—
2014	Air Supply – Live in Hong Kong: Released: 2014; Label: Evosound; Format: CD, DVD, BD, 2LP	—
2019	The Lost in Love Experience: Released: 2019; Label: Air Supply Concerts; Format: CD	—
"—" denotes releases that did not chart.

=== Compilation albums ===
Year	Album details	Peak chart positions			Certifications (sales thresholds)
Year	Album details	AUS	NZL	US	Certifications (sales thresholds)
1983	Greatest Hits: Released: August 1983; Label: Arista (ARI 90070); Format: LP, cassette	1	2	7	MC: 2× Platinum; RIAA: 5× Platinum
1983	Making Love ... The Very Best of Air Supply: Released: November 1983; Label: BMG; Format: LP, cassette	—	—	—	
1988	Love Songs: Released: January 1988; Label: Dino; Format: LP, cassette	94	—	—	
1992	Air Supply Collection: Released: 1992; Label: BMG; Format: Cassette, CD	—	—	—	
1999	The Definitive Collection: Released: 24 August 1999; Label: Arista; Format: CD	—	—	—	
2001	Sweet Dreams: The Encore Collection: Released: 2 July 2001; Label: BMG; Format: CD	—	—	—	
2003	Ultimate Air Supply: Released: 6 May 2003; Label: Arista; Format: CD	—	—	186	
2003	Forever Love: 36 Greatest Hits: Released: 2003; Label: BMG; Format: CD	—	—	—	
2004	Platinum and Gold Collection: Released: 4 May 2004; Label: Arista; Format: CD	—	—	—	
2005	The Singer and the Song: Released: 2005; Label: A Nice Pear; Format: CD	—	—	—	
2009	Free Love: Released: 2009; Label: Odds On; Format: CD	—	—	—	
2010	Playlist: The Very Best of Air Supply: Released: 26 January 2010; Label: Sony Legacy/Sony Music; Format: CD	—	—	—	
2012	The Ultimate Collection: Released: 27 April 2012; Label: EMI; Format: CD	38	38	—	RMNZ: Gold
"—" denotes releases that did not chart.

== Video albums ==
Title	Details	Certification
Live in Hawaii	Released: 1983; Label: Pioneer Artists	
Now and Forever – Greatest Hits Live – Video Special	Released: 1995; Label: Giant Records	
The Definitive DVD Collection	Released: 2001; Label: Arista, BMG	
It Was 30 Years Ago Today 1975–2005	Released: 2005; Label: MRA Entertainment	ARIA: Gold

== Singles ==
=== 1976–1983 ===
List of singles, with selected chart positions and certifications, showing year released and album name
Title	Year	Peak chart positions								Certifications	Album
Title	Year	AUS KMR	NZ	UK	IRE	CAN Hot	CAN AC	US Hot	US AC	Certifications	Album
"Love and Other Bruises"	1976	6	—	—	—	—	—	—	—		Air Supply
"Empty Pages"	1976	43	—	—	—	—	—	—	—		Air Supply
"Do What You Do"	1977	45	—	—	—	—	—	—	—		The Whole Thing's Started
"That's How the Whole Thing Started"	1977	—	—	—	—	—	—	—	—		The Whole Thing's Started
"Love and Other Bruises" (re-recorded version, released outside Australia)	1977	—	—	—	—	—	—	—	—		Love & Other Bruises
"Do It Again"	1978	—	—	—	—	—	—	—	—		The Whole Thing's Started
"What a Life"	1978	—	—	—	—	—	—	—	—		Love & Other Bruises
"Lost in Love" (original version)	1979	13	3	—	—	—	—	—	—	RIAA: Gold; RMNZ: Gold	Life Support
"Bring Out the Magic" / "Just Another Woman"	1979	—	—	—	—	—	—	—	—		Life Support
"Lost in Love" (remixed version)	1980	—	—	—	—	4	1	3	1		Lost in Love
"All Out of Love"	1980	9	21	11	10	2	—	2	5	BPI: Gold; MC: Gold; RIAA: 2× Platinum; RMNZ: Platinum	Lost in Love
"Every Woman in the World"	1980	8	7	—	—	31	—	5	2		Lost in Love
"The One That You Love"	1981	10	26	—	—	3	3	1	2	MC: Gold; RIAA: Gold	The One That You Love
"Here I Am"	1981	43	—	—	—	18	5	5	1		The One That You Love
"I'll Never Get Enough of You" (Note: "I'll Never Get Enough of You" released only in Japan. The proof of this was in the Japanese Wikipedia source: https://neverendingmusic.blog.jp/archives/20644210.html And please edit this page cause the proof is that it reached Number 5 on Oricon International Singles Chart.)	1981	—	—	—	—	—	—	—	—		The One That You Love
"Keeping the Love Alive" (Note: "Keeping the Love Alive" released only in Europe.)	1981	—	—	—	—	—	—	—	—		The One That You Love
"Sweet Dreams"	1981	—	—	—	—	14	15	5	4		The One That You Love
"Even the Nights Are Better"	1982	35	37	44	9	7	1	5	1	RIAA: Gold	Now and Forever
"Young Love"	1982	—	—	—	—	—	3	38	13		Now and Forever
"Two Less Lonely People in the World"	1982	46	—	—	—	—	2	38	4		Now and Forever
"I'm Late Again" (Note: "I'm Late Again" released only in Australia.)	1982	—	—	—	—	—	—	—	—		Now and Forever
"One Step Closer" (Note: "One Step Closer" released only in Japan.)	1983	—	—	—	—	—	—	—	—		Now and Forever
"Come What May" (Note: "Come What May" released only in the Philippines.)	1983	—	—	—	—	—	—	—	—		Now and Forever
"Now and Forever" (Note: "Now and Forever" released only in Australia.)	1983	—	—	—	—	—	—	—	—		Now and Forever
"Making Love Out of Nothing at All"	1983	45	24	80	30	3	4	2	2	MC: Gold; RIAA: 2× Platinum; RMNZ: Gold	Greatest Hits
"—" denotes a recording that did not chart or was not released in that territory.

Note: "All Out of Love" peaked at position 27 on the Dutch Top 40 chart in 1980.

=== 1984–2026 ===
List of singles, with selected chart positions and certifications, showing year released and album name
Title	Year	Peak chart positions								Album
Title	Year	AUS KMR ARIA	NZ	UK	IRE	CAN Hot	CAN AC	US Hot	US AC	Album
"I Can Wait Forever" (Note: "I Can Wait Forever" released only in Japan.)	1984	—	—	—	—	—	—	—	—	Ghostbusters (soundtrack) / Forever Love
"Just as I Am"	1985	79	—	124	—	12	9	19	3	Air Supply
"The Power of Love (You Are My Lady)"	1985	—	21	—	—	—	4	68	13	Air Supply
"I Can't Let Go" (Note: "I Can't Let Go" released only in the Philippines.)	1985	—	—	—	—	—	—	—	—	Air Supply
"Lonely Is the Night"	1986	—	—	168	—	—	—	76	12	Hearts in Motion
"One More Chance"	1986	—	—	—	—	—	—	—	—	Hearts in Motion
"Stars in Your Eyes"	1987	—	—	—	—	—	—	—	—	Hearts in Motion
"It's Not Too Late" (Note: "It's Not Too Late" released only in Japan.)	1987	—	—	—	—	—	—	—	—	Hearts in Motion
"The Christmas Song"	1987	—	—	—	—	—	—	—	—	The Christmas Album
"The Eyes of a Child"	1987	—	—	—	—	—	—	—	—	The Christmas Album
"Without You"	1991	—	—	—	—	—	—	—	48	The Earth Is...
"Stronger Than the Night"	1991	—	—	—	—	—	—	—	—	The Earth Is...
"Goodbye"	1993	140	—	66	—	—	—	—	48	The Vanishing Race
"Someone"	1995	—	—	—	—	—	—	—	60	News from Nowhere
"Unchained Melody"	1995	—	—	—	—	—	—	—	—	News from Nowhere
"The Way I Feel"	1995	—	—	—	—	—	—	—	—	Now and Forever...Greatest Hits Live
"Strong Strong Wind"	1997	—	—	—	—	—	—	—	—	The Book of Love
"You Are the Reason"	2001	—	—	—	—	—	—	—	—	Yours Truly
"Shadow of the Sun"	2003	—	—	—	—	—	—	—	—	Across the Concrete Sky
"Dance with Me"	2010	—	—	—	—	—	—	—	28	Mumbo Jumbo
"Faith in Love"	2010	—	—	—	—	—	—	—	30	Mumbo Jumbo
"I Adore You"	2015	—	—	—	—	—	—	—	—	Non-album single
"A Matter of Time"	2026	—	—	—	—	—	—	—	—	A Matter of Time
"Can We Say I Do"	2026	—	—	—	—	—	—	—	—	A Matter of Time
"—" denotes a recording that did not chart or was not released in that territory.

== Music videos ==
Year	Title
1976	"Love and Other Bruises"
1977	"Bring Out the Magic"
1980	"Lost in Love"
1980	"All Out of Love"
1980	"Every Woman in the World"
1981	"Even the Nights Are Better"
1981	"Young Love"
1982	"Here I Am (Just When I Thought I Was Over You)"
1982	"Keeping the Love Alive"
1982	"The One That You Love"
1983	"Making Love Out of Nothing at All"
1985	"Just as I Am"
1985	"The Power of Love"
1986	"Lonely Is the Night"
1986	"One More Chance"
1987	"Winter Wonderland"
1987	"The Eyes of a Child"
1991	"Without You"
1991	"Stronger Than the Night"
1991	"Stop the Tears"
1993	"It's Never Too Late"
1993	"Goodbye"
1994	"You'll Never Know (with Alejandro Lerner)"
1995	"Someone"
1995	"Unchained Melody"
1995	"Always"
1997	"Strong Strong Wind"
2001	"You Are the Reason"
2005	"Miracles"
2011	"Sanctuary"
2014	"Desert Sea Sky"
2015	"I Adore You"
2022	"Be Tough"
