= Forever Love: 36 Greatest Hits =

Compilation album by Air Supply

Compilation album by Air Supply
- Released: 21 April 2003
- Genre: Soft rock, adult contemporary
- Length: 155:02 (77:11+77:51)
- Label: BMG, RCA Victor Europe

Air Supply chronology
Yours Truly (2001)	Forever Love: 36 Greatest Hits (2003)	Across the Concrete Sky (2003)

Forever Love: 36 Greatest Hits (1980–2001) is a double-disc compilation album by Australian soft rock band Air Supply, released in 2003. It is the most complete collection of the band's work, including most of the band's singles up to 2001, as well as more obscure tracks such as "Strong Strong Wind" and "The Way I Feel". The compilation also includes songs from Russell Hitchcock's solo album and the live album Greatest Hits Live ... Now and Forever.

== Reception ==
Professional ratings
Review scores
Source	Rating
Allmusic	Link
Discogs	4/5 stars

James Monger of AllMusic felt that "Australian soft rock stewards Air Supply have had more than their share of compilations, but this sprawling 36-track collection from BMG is the first and last word on the amorous duo. Listeners who just want the hits -- whether "Making Love Out of Nothing at All," "All Out of Love," "Lost in Love," "Young Love," or any of their other hits with the word "love" in them—would be better off picking up Arista's 18-song Definitive Collection, but true Supply fans will need the exhaustive Forever Love: Greatest Hits, if only to have "Here I Am (Just When I Thought I Was Over You)," "I'll Never Get Enough of You," "Someone Who Believes in You," "Without You," and every other song with the word "you" in it."

== Track listing ==
=== Disc 1 ===
#	Title	Writer	Length	Album
1	"Lost in Love"	Graham Russell	3:54	Lost in Love (1980)
2	"Every Woman in the World"	Dominic Bugatti / Frank Musker	3:30	Lost in Love (1980)
3	"All Out of Love"	Clive Davis / Russell	4:02	Lost in Love (1980)
4	"Chances"	Russell	3:35	Lost in Love (1980)
5	"The One That You Love"	Russell	4:18	The One That You Love (1981)
6	"Here I Am (Just When I Thought I Was Over You)"	Norman Sallitt / Michael Masser / Linda Creed	3:49	The One That You Love (1981)
7	"I'll Never Get Enough of You"	Jeanne Napoli / Gary Portnoy / Judy Quay	3:48	The One That You Love (1981)
8	"Tonite"	Russell	3:48	The One That You Love (1981)
9	"Sweet Dreams"	Russell	5:20	The One That You Love (1981)
10	"Come What May"	Tom Snow / Cynthia Weil	4:01	Now and Forever (1982)
11	"Even the Nights Are Better"	Ken Bell / Terry Skinner / J.L. Wallace	3:57	Now and Forever (1982)
12	"Two Less Lonely People in the World"	Howard Greenfield / Ken Hirsch	4:02	Now and Forever (1982)
13	"Young Love"	Russell	3:53	Now and Forever (1982)
14	"Taking the Chance"	Russell	4:11	Now and Forever (1982)
15	"Making Love Out of Nothing at All"	Jim Steinman	5:43	Air Supply Greatest Hits (1983)
16	"I Can Wait Forever"	David Foster / Jay Graydon / Russell	5:10	Ghostbusters: Original Soundtrack Album / The Definitive Collection (1984/1985)
17	"Just as I Am"	Rob Hegel / Dick Wagner	4:45	Air Supply (1985)
18	"The Power of Love (You Are My Lady)"	Mary Applegate / Candy Derouge / Gunther Mende / Jennifer Rush	5:26	Air Supply (1985)

=== Disc 2 ===
#	Title	Writer	Length	Album
1	"Lonely Is the Night"	Albert Hammond / Diane Warren	4:12	Hearts in Motion (1986)
2	"What Becomes of the Broken Hearted?" (Russell Hitchcock solo)	James Dean / Paul Riser / William Weatherspoon	3:39	Russell Hitchcock (1988)
3	"Someone Who Believes in You" (Russell Hitchcock solo)	Gerry Goffin / Carole King	4:15	Russell Hitchcock (1988)
4	"Where Did the Feeling Go?" (Russell Hitchcock solo)	Norman Sallitt	3:49	Russell Hitchcock (1988)
5	"Without You"	Tom Evans / Pete Ham	4:50	The Earth Is ... (1991)
6	"Goodbye"	David Foster / Linda Thompson-Jenner	4:05	The Vanishing Race (1993)
7	"It's Never Too Late"	Russell / Michael Sherwood	6:00	The Vanishing Race (1993)
8	"Too Sentimental"	Brad Buxer / Russell	3:53	The Vanishing Race (1993)
9	"Always"	Guy Allison / Russell / Sherwood	4:14	News from Nowhere (1995)
10	"Unchained Melody"	Alex North / Hy Zaret	3:42	News from Nowhere (1995)
11	"I Want to Give It All (Live)"	Rex Goh / Russell	4:26	Greatest Hits Live ... Now and Forever (1995)
12	"The Way I Feel"	Allison / Russell	4:42	Greatest Hits Live ... Now and Forever (1995)
13	"Now and Forever"	Russell	4:17	Greatest Hits Live ... Now and Forever (1995)
14	"Strong Strong Wind"	Diane Warren	4:22	The Book of Love (1997)
15	"Once"	Jed Moss / Russell	4:59	The Book of Love (1997)
16	"Daybreak"	Russell	4:28	The Book of Love (1997)
17	"Only One Forever"	Russell	3:23	Yours Truly (2001)
18	"Yours Truly"	Russell	4:35	Yours Truly (2001)

== Credits ==
- Liner notes – Graham Russell, Russell Hitchcock
- Photography by Lady Jodi Russell
