= Greatest Hits (1983 Air Supply album) =

Greatest hits album by Air Supply
- Released: August 1983
- Genres: Pop rock, soft rock
- Length: 37:27 (CD Edition)
- Label: Arista
- Producers: Rick Chertoff, Charles Fisher; Harry Maslin; Robie Porter; Jim Steinman; Peter Dawkins

Air Supply chronology
Now and Forever (1982)	Greatest Hits (1983)	Making Love ... The Very Best of Air Supply (1983)

Singles from Greatest Hits
- 1. "Making Love Out of Nothing at All" Released: July 1983

Greatest Hits or Air Supply Greatest Hits is a greatest hits album by British-Australian soft rock duo Air Supply, released in August 1983. It spent one week on top of the Australian (Kent Music Report) album chart and reached number seven on the Billboard 200. The Jim Steinman-written and produced track "Making Love Out of Nothing at All" had been released in July as a single. It is Air Supply's last top 10 hit in the United States, peaking at No. 2 on the Billboard Hot 100. "Making Love Out of Nothing at All" also reached top 10 in Canada and South Africa. The album was certified 5× platinum in 1993 in the US, denoting shipments of five million copies.

== Background ==
British-Australian soft rock group Air Supply had been formed in Melbourne in 1975 by vocalists Russell Hitchcock and Graham Russell. By the late 1970s, they were based in the United States. The duo had released seven studio albums, Air Supply (1976), The Whole Thing's Started, Love & Other Bruises (both 1977), Life Support (1979), Lost in Love (1980), The One That You Love (1981) and Now and Forever (1982). Their compilation album Greatest Hits or Air Supply Greatest Hits was issued on vinyl by EMI Records in Australia and Arista Records in the United States in August 1983. Each included a new track "Making Love Out of Nothing at All", released as a single a month earlier. The EMI version had 13 tracks with "Love and Other Bruises", "Bring out the Magic", "Two Less Lonely People in the World" and "Now and Forever" not included on the 9-track Arista version.

== Reception ==
Professional ratings
Review scores
Source	Rating
AllMusic	4/5 stars

Stephen Thomas Erlewine of AllMusic reviewed the 1988 Arista Records version of Greatest Hits and rated it at four-out-of-five starts, "[it's] all that most Air Supply fans need, at least casual fans, but even the hardcore followers are sure to like having such a concentrated dose of hits in one package." Australian writer Glenn A. Baker described how they used their "undeniably American laid-back style" to provide "six Stateside top ten hits", which are included on this compilation. He considered the songs' writers, aside from band member Graham Russell, who "continued to pen excellent commercial songs, outside hitwriters (such as Lee Greenwood and the legendary Howie Greenfield) were also engaged to keep the hits flowing."

== Track listing ==
All tracks are written by Graham Russell, unless otherwise noted.

Greatest Hits EMI Records (BIT.10000)
No.	Title	Album	Length
1.	"Love and Other Bruises"	Air Supply	3:40
2.	"Bring out the Magic"	Life Support	3:51
3.	"The One That You Love"	The One That You Love	4:17
4.	"Here I Am" (Norman Sallitt, Michael Masser, Linda Creed)	The One That You Love	3:46
5.	"Sweet Dreams"	The One That You Love	5:19
6.	"Lost in Love"	Lost in Love	3:51
7.	"Chances"	Lost in Love	3:32
8.	"Every Woman in the World" (Dominic Bugatti, Frank Musker)	Lost in Love	3:30
9.	"All Out of Love" (Russell, Clive Davis)	Lost in Love	4:01
10.	"Even the Nights Are Better" (K Bell, T Skinner, J L Wallace)	Now and Forever	3:57
11.	"Two Less Lonely People in the World" (Howard Greenfield, Ken Hirsch)	Now and Forever	3:59
12.	"Now and Forever"	Now and Forever	4:18
13.	"Making Love Out of Nothing at All" (Jim Steinman)	New recording	5:15

Greatest Hits Arista Records (AL8-8024)

1. "Lost in Love" – 3:51
2. "Even the Nights Are Better" – 3:57
3. "The One That You Love" – 4:17
4. "Every Woman in the World" – 3:29
5. "Chances" – 3:32
6. "Making Love Out of Nothing at All" – 5:15
7. "All Out of Love" – 4:01
8. "Here I Am" – 3:46
9. "Sweet Dreams" – 5:19

== Personnel ==
Credits (tracks 1–5, 7–9)

- Russell Hitchcock – lead vocals, backing vocals
- Graham Russell – lead vocals (1, 4, 7), backing vocals (1, 3, 4, 7–9), rhythm guitar (1, 2, 4, 5, 7), acoustic guitar (3, 8, 9)
- Frank Esler-Smith – keyboards, orchestrations
- David Moyse – lead guitar (1, 3–5, 7–9), bass (1, 4, 5, 7), backing vocals (1, 4, 5, 7), rhythm guitar (3, 8, 9)
- Rex Goh – lead guitar (2), rhythm guitar (8, 9)
- David Green – bass (2, 3, 8, 9)
- Ralph Cooper – drums (1–5, 7–9)

Credits (track 6 "Making Love Out of Nothing at All")

Air Supply

- Russell Hitchcock – lead vocals
- Graham Russell – backing vocals

Musicians

- Roy Bittan – acoustic piano, synthesisers, arrangements
- Larry Fast – synthesisers
- Rick Derringer – guitars
- Sid McGinnis – acoustic guitar
- Steve Buslowe – bass
- Max Weinberg – drums
- Jimmy Maelen – percussion
- Jim Steinman – arrangements
- Rory Dodd – additional backing vocals
- Holly Sherwood – additional backing vocals
- Eric Troyer – additional backing vocals

=== Production ===
- Clive Davis – executive producer
- Rick Chertoff – producer (1)
- Charles Fisher – producer (1)
- Robie Porter – producer (1, 4, 5, 7)
- Harry Maslin – producer (2–4, 8, 9), engineer (2, 3, 8, 9)
- Jim Steinman – producer (6), mixing (6)
- John Jansen – associate producer (6), engineer (6), mixing (6)
- Rod Hui – engineer (6)
- Scott Litt – engineer (6)
- Arthur Payson – engineer (6)
- Dee Rob – engineer (6)
- Neil Dorfsman – mixing (6)
- Greg Calbi – mastering (6)
- Donn Davenport – art direction, design
- Linda Fenimore – illustration
- Don Arden – management

== Charts ==
=== Weekly charts ===
Chart (1983–84)	Peak position
Australian Albums (Kent Music Report)	27
Canada Top Albums/CDs (RPM)	15
New Zealand Albums (RMNZ)	2
US Billboard 200	7

=== Year-end charts ===
Chart (1983)	Position
Canada Top Albums/CDs (RPM)	55
New Zealand Albums (RMNZ)	26
Chart (1984)	Position
US Billboard 200	57

== Certifications and sales ==
Region	Certification	Certified units/sales
Argentina (CAPIF)	2× Platinum	120,000^{^}
Canada (Music Canada)	2× Platinum	200,000^{^}
Hong Kong (IFPI Hong Kong)	Platinum	20,000^{*}
New Zealand (RMNZ)	Platinum	15,000^{^}
United States (RIAA)	5× Platinum	5,000,000^{^}
^{*} Sales figures based on certification alone.^{^} Shipments figures based on certification alone.
