= Air supply =

Air supply may refer to:

- Ventilation (architecture)
- Airlift
- Air Supply, a soft rock music duo
  - Air Supply (1976 album)
  - Air Supply (1985 album)
- Air Supply, a song by Sweet Trip from their 2009 album You Will Never Know Why

== See also ==
- Breathing apparatus
- Air compressor
- Oxygen
