= The Christmas Album (Air Supply album) =

1987 studio album by Air Supply

Studio album by Air Supply
- Released: November 1987
- Studio: A&M Studios (Hollywood, California)
- Genres: Soft rock, Christmas
- Length: 33:22
- Label: Arista
- Producers: Russell Hitchcock; Michael Lloyd; Graham Russell

Air Supply chronology
Hearts in Motion (1986)	The Christmas Album (1987)	The Earth Is... (1991)

Singles from The Christmas Album
- 1. "The Christmas Song" Released: November 1987; 2. "The Eyes of a Child" Released: December 1987

Professional ratings
Review scores
Source	Rating
AllMusic	2.5/5 stars

The Christmas Album is the tenth studio album by British-Australian soft rock duo Air Supply, released in 1987. It was their last studio album to be released under Arista Records. The album features recordings of classic Christmas songs plus the two original songs, "Love Is All" and "The Eyes of a Child". There is a short instrumental version of "What Child Is This" in the track "Silent Night".

== Track listing ==
1. "White Christmas" (Irving Berlin) - 3:25
2. "The First Noel" (Traditional, William Sandys) - 3:23
3. "The Little Drummer Boy" (Katherine K. Davis, Henry Onorati, Harry Simeone) - 3:07
4. "The Eyes of a Child" (Graham Russell, Brendan Graham, Rolf Løvland, Ron Bloom) - 4:33
5. "Silent Night" (Franz Xaver Gruber, Joseph Mohr, John F. Young) - 3:08
6. "The Christmas Song" (Mel Torme, Robert Wells) - 3:01
7. "Sleigh Ride" (Leroy Anderson, Mitchell Parish) - 2:23
8. "Winter Wonderland" (Felix Bernard, Richard B. Smith) - 2:35
9. "O Come All Ye Faithful" (Frederick Oakeley, John Francis Wade) - 3:14
10. "Love Is All" (Graham Russell, Billy Steinberg, Tom Kelly) - 4:30

== Personnel ==
Air Supply

- Russell Hitchcock – vocals, backing vocals
- Graham Russell – vocals, backing vocals

Musicians and Background vocals

- Jim Cox – keyboards
- John Hobbs – keyboards
- Michael Lloyd – keyboards, additional backing vocals
- Laurence Juber – guitars
- Dennis Belfield – bass
- Ron Krasinski – drums, percussion
- Paul Leim – drums
- Alan Estes – percussion
- Michael Fisher – percussion
- Bob Zimmitti – percussion
- Linda Harmon – additional backing vocals
- Edie Lehmann – additional backing vocals
- Patti Lloyd – additional backing vocals
- Debbie Lytton – additional backing vocals
- Jeni Lytton – additional backing vocals

Orchestra

- John D'Andrea – arrangements (1, 6–9)
- Nick Strimple – arrangements (2–5, 10)
- John Rosenberg – brass direction
- Sid Sharp – string direction

Brass and Woodwinds

- Don Ashworth, Jon Clarke, Ronald Jannelli and John Mitchell – woodwinds
- Ernie Carlson, Dick Hyde and Lew McCreary – trombone
- Stuart Blumberg and John Rosenberg – trumpet
- Brian O'Connor and James Thatcher – French horn

Strings

- Gayle Levant – harp
- Israel Baker, Arnold Belnick, Kenneth Burward-Hoy, Samuel Boghossian, Bonnie Douglas, Bruce Dukov, Arni Egilsson, Jesse Ehrlich, Henry Ferber, James Getzoff, Harris Goldman, V. Grahat, Endre Granat, Nathan Kaproff, Dennis Karmazyn, Ray Kelley, Jerome Kessler, Myra Kestenbaum, William Kurasch, Joy Lyle, Michael Markman, Donald McInnes, Buell Neidlinger, Michael Nowak, Stanley Plummer, David Shamban, Sid Sharp, Harry Shultz and Tibor Zelig – string players

== Production ==
- Jimmy Ienner – executive producer, mixing
- Russell Hitchcock – producer
- Graham Russell – producer
- Michael Lloyd – producer, mixing
- Carmine Rubino – engineer, mixing
- Dan Nebenzal – mixing, assistant engineer
- Steve Barncard – assistant engineer
- Greg Goldman – assistant engineer
- Ron Jacobs – assistant engineer
- Brad Lambert – assistant engineer
- Bob Vogt – assistant engineer, mix assistant
- Maude Gilman – art direction
- Robert Cohen – photography
- Susan Tobman – clothing stylist
- Imageworks – styling, set
- Foley – make-up
- T.A.G. – hair
- JACOB Jr. – children's clothing
- Clifford's Farm – sleigh
