= Greatest Hits Live ... Now and Forever =

1995 live album by Air Supply

Live album by Air Supply
- Released: 1995
- Recorded: Taipei, Taiwan
- Genre: Soft rock
- Label: Warner Bros. Records
- Producer: Graham Russell

Air Supply chronology
News from Nowhere (1995)	Greatest Hits Live ... Now and Forever (1995)	The Book of Love (1997)

Professional ratings
Review scores
Source	Rating
AllMusic	3/5 stars

Greatest Hits Live ... Now and Forever is a live album by British-Australian soft rock duo Air Supply, released in 1995. It also contains two new studio recordings of previously released songs. The album was a massive success in Asia, where in Taiwan it topped the album charts for 16 weeks. It was recorded in Taipei, Taiwan, and later a DVD of the concert was released. The band played live with a 16-piece string section.

== Track listing ==
1. "The Vanishing Race" (Russell, Sherwood)
2. "Making Love Out of Nothing at All" (Steinman) – 5:46
3. "Chances" (Russell) – 3:46
4. "Lost in Love" (Russell) – 4:29
5. "Sweet Dreams" (Russell) – 7:14
6. "Someone" (Allison, Russell) – 5:45
7. "Always" (Allison, Russell, Sherwood) – 4:22
8. "Unchained Melody" (North, Zaret) – 3:48
9. "The One That You Love" (Russell) – 4:36
10. "Goodbye" (Foster, Thompson-Jenner) 4:03
11. "All Out of Love" (Davis, Russell) – 6:11
12. "I Can Wait Forever" (Foster, Russell)
13. "Just Between the Lines" (Russell)
14. "I Want to Give It All" (Russell)
15. "Here I Am (Just When I Thought I Was Over You)" (Masser, Sallitt, Creed)
16. "Don't Be Afraid" (Russell)
17. "Without You" (Ham, Evans)
18. "The Way I Feel" [Studio] (Allison, Russell) – 4:40
19. "Now and Forever" [Studio] (Russell) – 4:17

== Personnel ==
- Russell Hitchcock – vocals
- Graham Russell – vocals, keyboards, guitars
- Guy Allison – acoustic piano, keyboards
- Clifford Rehrig – bass, backing vocals
- Mark T. Williams – drums, percussion, backing vocals

Featuring:

- The Taipei Symphony Orchestra
- Mei-Ying Lin – orchestra leader
- Mark T. Williams – conductor

== Production ==
- Producer – Graham Russell
- Engineer and mixing – Alejandro Rodriguez
- Assistant engineer – Erich Gobel
- Design – Heather Porter
