= Chrissie Hammond =

English singer and musician

- Born: Christine Hammond; November 25, 1956 (age 69); England, United Kingdom
- Genres: Rock, pop
- Occupations: Singer, musician
- Years active: 1970s–present

Chrissie Hammond (born 1956) is an English singer and musician, best known as one half of the rock duo Cheetah (band), which she formed with her sister Lyndsay Hammond, and as a long-time vocalist with keyboardist Rick Wakeman. She was also an early member of the soft rock band Air Supply.

== Early life ==
Hammond was born in England in 1956 and later moved to Australia. Details of her early musical influences are limited in published sources, but she began performing in musical theatre during the 1970s.

== Career ==
=== Early career ===
Hammond first came to prominence in 1975 when she performed as Mary Magdalene in the Australian production of Jesus Christ Superstar.

In 1976, she co-founded Air Supply with Russell Hitchcock and Graham Russell, singing on the group’s first single "Love and Other Bruises" before leaving to pursue other projects.

=== Cheetah ===
In 1976, Chrissie and her sister Lyndsay formed the rock duo Cheetah (band). The group signed with Albert Productions and had several singles, including a Top Ten hit in Australia with "Walking in the Rain" (1978). They toured widely, supporting acts such as U2, Neil Young, and Jackson Browne, and performed at major festivals including the Reading Festival in 1982. Cheetah disbanded in 1984 but briefly reunited in 2006 for a European tour.

=== Work with Rick Wakeman ===
Following Cheetah’s split, Hammond became a regular vocalist with keyboardist Rick Wakeman, appearing on more than a dozen of his albums from the mid-1980s onwards.

=== Later work ===
Hammond has continued to perform both solo and in collaborations. She has made television and stage appearances, and has been interviewed reflecting on her career and experiences in the Australian and British music industries.

== Discography ==
=== With Cheetah ===
- Rock and Roll Women (1982, Albert Productions)
- Singles include "Walking in the Rain" (1978) – AUS #10

=== With Air Supply ===
- Contributed vocals on early Air Supply material, including the 1976 single "Love and Other Bruises".

=== With Rick Wakeman ===
- Featured vocalist on albums including Live at Hammersmith (1985), Time Machine (1988), and others.
