= Air Supply (1976 album) =

1976 studio album by Air Supply

Studio album by Air Supply
- Released: December 1976
- Recorded: October 1976
- Studios: Albert Studio, Sydney
- Genres: Soft rock, disco
- Length: 42:37
- Label: CBS
- Producer: Peter Dawkins

Air Supply chronology
Air Supply (1976)	The Whole Thing's Started (1977)

Alternate cover
- Japanese reissue

Singles from Air Supply
- 1. "Love and Other Bruises" Released: October 1976; 2. "Empty Pages" Released: February 1977

Air Supply is the debut album by British/Australian soft rock band Air Supply released on CBS Records in December 1976. The lead single "Love and Other Bruises" was released in October, reaching No. 6 on the Kent Music Report Singles Chart, followed by the album's peak at No. 17 on the Kent Albums Chart. While the album reached gold status in Australia, the second single "Empty Pages" did not reach the Top 40 in February 1977. The album was issued as Strangers in Love in Japan.

The album preceded the band's international breakthrough, which came with Lost in Love in 1980. The band would later release another self-titled album in 1985.

== Background ==
Chrissie Hammond, Russell Hitchcock and Graham Russell met in May 1975 while performing in the Australian production of the Andrew Lloyd Webber and Tim Rice musical, Jesus Christ Superstar. With Hammond and Hitchcock on vocals and Russell on guitar, they formed Air Supply as a harmony vocal group in Melbourne. Hammond left to form Cheetah and was replaced by Jeremy Paul (ex-Soffrok) on bass guitar and vocals in 1976. The group's first single, "Love and Other Bruises", peaked at No. 6 on the Australian Kent Music Report Singles Chart in October. It was followed by Air Supply, their debut album, in December, which reached No. 17 on the Kent Music Report Albums Chart and achieved gold in Australia. The album was produced by Peter Dawkins (Spectrum, Ross Ryan) with Air Supply line-up as Hitchcock, Paul, Russell and drummer Jeff Browne, guitarist Mark McEntee and keyboardist/arranger Adrian Scott. The second single was "Empty Pages" peaked at No. 43. A national tour followed with Hitchcock, Paul, Russell and Scott joined by Nigel Macara (ex-Tamam Shud, Ariel) on drums and Brenton White (Skintight) on guitar. Brenton White rehearsed but did not perform with Air Supply.

== Critical reception ==
Cashbox said that "their music is polished, poised and mainstream without being predictable".

== Track listing ==
All tracks are written by Graham Russell.

Side one
No.	Title	Lead vocals	Length
1.	"Feel the Breeze"	Russell Hitchcock	3:59
2.	"I Don't Believe You"	Air Supply	4:04
3.	"Empty Pages"	Hitchcock	4:21
4.	"What a Life"	Jeremy Paul	4:39
5.	"Secret Agent"	Graham Russell	3:43

Side two
No.	Title	Lead vocals	Length
1.	"The Weight Is My Soul"	Russell	3:29
2.	"Love and Other Bruises"	Hitchcock	3:43
3.	"It's Not Easy"	Russell with Hitchcock	4:25
4.	"We Are All Alone"	Russell	3:17
5.	"Strangers in Love"	Hitchcock	3:48
6.	"Ain't It a Shame"	Russell with Hitchcock	3:09
Total length:			42:37

== Personnel ==
Musicians

- Graham Russell – lead vocals, backing vocals, electric and acoustic guitars
- Russell Hitchcock – lead vocals, backing vocals
- Jeremy Paul – bass guitar, backing vocals, lead vocals (on "What a Life")
- Adrian Scott – keyboards, additional vocals
- Mark McEntee – electric, rhythm, and lead guitars
- Jeff Browne – drums
- Ian Bloxsom – extra percussion
- William Motzing – string arrangements and conduction
- Graeme Pearce – drums (on "Love and Other Bruises")
- Peter Deacon – piano (on "Love and Other Bruises")

Production

- Peter Dawkins – producer
- Richard Lush – engineer (at EMI Studios, Sydney)
- Bruce Brown – engineer on "Love and Other Bruises" (at Albert Studios)
- Martin Benge – additional engineering
- Mastering – CBS Records, Artarmon
- J. Peter Thoeming – art direction, design
- Carroll Holloway – photography

== Charts ==
Chart (1976/77)	Peak position
Australian Albums (Kent Music Report)	17

== Certifications and sales ==
Region	Certification	Certified units/sales
Australia (ARIA)	Gold	50,000^{^}
^{^} Shipments figures based on certification alone.

== Release history ==
Date	Region	Label	Format	Catalog	Notes
1976	Australia	CBS	LP	SBP 234929	
1976	New Zealand	CBS	LP	SBP 234929	
1976	Canada	Columbia	LP	PES 90413	
1976	Australia	CBS	CAS	PC 4929	
1976	Australia	Summit/Rainbow	CAS	SUL 3002	
1977	Australia	CBS	2LP	SBP 241031	Repackaged with The Whole Thing's Started
1980	Japan	Epic/Sony	LP	25•3P-232	Issued as Strangers in Love, alternate cover
1981	Australia	Harmony	LP	HC 15070	Love and Other Bruises compilation, includes six tracks from Air Supply
1981	Australia	Harmony	CAS	TCHC 15070	Love and Other Bruises compilation, includes six tracks from Air Supply
1981	Australia	Summit/Rainbow	CAS	SC 3036	Love and Other Bruises compilation, includes six tracks from Air Supply
1988	Australia	Columbia/Sony	CD	463016 2	Love and Other Bruises compilation, includes six tracks from Air Supply
1988	Australia	CBS/Disctronics	CD	463016 2	Reissue of 1981 compilation, alternate cover
1988	Australia	CBS	CAS	463016 4	Reissue of 1981 compilation, alternate cover
1991	Australia	Rainbow	CD	RCD 1118	First appearance of full album on CD
1992	Australia	Rainbow	2CD	2RCD 111/112	Feel the Breeze, includes Air Supply and The Whole Thing's Started
1996	Korea	Columbia/Sony	CD	486553.2	Once Upon a Time, includes three tracks from Air Supply
1996	Korea	Columbia/Sony	CAS	486553.4	Once Upon a Time, includes three tracks from Air Supply

== See also ==
- Air Supply (1985 album)
