= Love & Other Bruises =

1978 studio album by Air Supply

Love and Other Bruises

Studio album by Air Supply
- Released: 1978
- Recorded: July–August 1977
- Studio: Cherokee Studios, Los Angeles
- Genre: Soft rock
- Label: Columbia
- Producer: Jimmy Horowitz

Air Supply chronology
The Whole Thing's Started (1977)	Love and Other Bruises (1978)	Life Support (1979)

Professional ratings
Review scores
Source	Rating
AllMusic	2/5 stars

Love & Other Bruises is the third studio album by British-Australian soft rock duo Air Supply. It was their debut album in America and only released internationally. The album compiled re-recorded versions of some of their past singles, such as "What a Life", "Feel the Breeze" and "Empty Pages", from their self-titled debut album, and "Do It Again", "End of the Line" and "That's How the Whole Thing Started" from the album The Whole Thing's Started. "Who Will Love Me Now" and "Does It Matter" were new songs written for this specific album.

The album was recorded in America while the band were touring in support of Rod Stewart and designed specifically for the American market. Air Supply's touring band was not utilised on the record.

Lead vocalists Graham Russell and Russell Hitchcock sang their parts to tracks laid down by American studio musicians. Jeremy Paul, Air Supply's bass player and third lead vocalist was relegated to backing vocal duties for the recording sessions. This led to his leaving the band after the album's release. The album failed to chart.

== Reception ==
Cash Box magazine said "Their music is polished, poised and mainstream without being predictable."

== Track listing ==
All songs composed by Graham Russell.

1. "Love and Other Bruises"
2. "What a Life"
3. "Feel the Breeze"
4. "Who Will Love Me Now"
5. "Do It Again"
6. "The End of the Line"
7. "Ready for You"
8. "Empty Pages"
9. "Does It Matter"
10. "That's How the Whole Thing Started" (Graham Russell, Johann Pachelbel)

== Personnel ==
- Russell Hitchcock, Graham Russell - lead vocals
- Russell Hitchcock, Graham Russell, Jeremy Paul, Joey Carbone - backing vocals
- Ross Salomone - drums, percussion
- Jeff Eyrich - bass guitar
- Rick Lo Tempio, Tony Berg - electric guitar
- Tony Berg - acoustic guitar
- Joey Carbone - acoustic piano, clavinet, electric piano
- John Jarvis - acoustic piano
- Jimmy Horowitz - organ and piano on "That's How the Whole Thing Started"
- Steve Madaio, Chuck Findley, Jim Horn, David Luell - horns
- Jim Horn - alto saxophone solo on "Does It Matter"
- David Luell - tenor saxophone solo on "What a Life": David Luell
- Strings arranged by David Katz

Technical

- Management: Bastall Reynolds
- Engineer: Tim Sadler
- Producer: Jimmy Horowitz
- Design: Roger Carpenter, Nancy Donald
- Photography: Gary Heery
