= Yours Truly (Air Supply album) =

Studio album by Air Supply
- Released: 28 August 2001
- Recorded: 2000 at Woodland Magic (Las Vegas, Nevada); L.A. East Studios (Salt Lake City, Utah).
- Genre: Soft rock
- Length: 56:12
- Label: Giant Records
- Producer: Graham Russell, Mark T. Williams

Air Supply chronology
The Definitive Collection (1999)	Yours Truly (2001)	Across the Concrete Sky (2003)

Yours Truly is the fifteenth studio album by British/Australian soft rock duo Air Supply, released in 2001. The songs "Yours Truly" and "You Are the Reason" have gained critical acclaim.

== Critical reception ==
Professional ratings
Review scores
Source	Rating
AllMusic	1.5/5 stars

Jonathan Widran of AllMusic called the album as "disastrous" with the sweeping, orchestrally enhanced "You Are the Reason" the only track that comes close to capturing the "sugary charm of the band's old days." Widran criticized the album's overall production, saying it has inane lyrics, songs are mundane, and Russell Hitchcock's voice attraction is "completely suppressed" here.

== Track listing ==
All tracks are written by Graham Russell, except where noted.

No.	Title	Writer(s)	Length
1.	"Who Am I"		3:38
2.	"Body Glove"		4:34
3.	"Don't Throw Our Love Away"		4:58
4.	"Tell Me of Spring"	T. Pulnam, Tim Putnam, Russell	4:07
5.	"Why Don't You Come Over"	T. Pulnam, Putnam, Russell	5:10
6.	"Yours Truly"		4:37
7.	"You Are the Reason" (featuring Mehnaz)		4:28
8.	"Only One Forever"		3:22
9.	"If You Love Me"	Clifford Rehrig, Russell, Noble Williams	4:22
10.	"The Scene"	Rehrig, Russell, Williams	4:30
11.	"Learning to Make Love to You"		4:29
12.	"Peaches and Cream"	Putman, Russell	4:16
13.	"Hard to Forget Her"		3:41
Total length:			56:12

== Personnel ==
Air Supply

- Russell Hitchcock – lead and backing vocals
- Graham Russell – lead and backing vocals, acoustic guitar, electric guitar, keyboards (1, 2), synthesizers (4, 13)

Additional musicians

- Brian Hess – organ (3, 13)
- Jed Moss – acoustic piano (10), backing vocals (10)
- Guy Allison – acoustic piano (11)
- Jimmy Haun – guitar (2, 7)
- Larry Antonino – bass (1–4, 6, 8, 9, 13)
- Alec Milstein – bass (5, 11, 12)
- Clifford Rehrig – bass (7)
- Mark T. Williams – drums, percussion, conductor (3, 4, 6, 7, 9, 10, 13), strings (4, 9, 10, 13), arrangements (4, 9, 10, 13), orchestrations (4, 9, 10, 13), sequencing (9, 10), bass (10)
- Louis Clark – strings (3, 6, 7), arrangements (3, 6, 7)
- Mehnaz Hoosein – lead and backing vocals (7)
- Michael Sherwood – backing vocals (12)

== Production ==
- Graham Russell – producer, executive producer, mixing
- Mark T. Williams – producer, mixing
- Jay Anderson – engineer (1–6, 8–13), audio recording
- Tom Fletcher – engineer (7)
- Eddy Schreyer – mastering at Oasis Mastering (Burbank, California).
- Katherine Delaney – design
- Jodi Russell – cover layout, design, photography
