= Making Love ... The Very Best of Air Supply =

Compilation album by Air Supply
- Released: 4 November 1983
- Recorded: 1976–1983
- Genre: Soft rock
- Length: 46:56
- Label: Arista
- Producers: Charles Fisher, Rick Chertoff, Robie Porter, Harry Maslin

Air Supply chronology
Greatest Hits (1983)	Making Love ... The Very Best of Air Supply (1983)	Air Supply (1985)

Professional ratings
Review scores
Source	Rating
AllMusic	4/5 stars

Making Love ... The Very Best of Air Supply is the second compilation album by British/Australian soft rock duo Air Supply, released in 1983. Earlier that year, Greatest Hits was also issued and included "Making Love Out of Nothing at All", which was issued as a new single in August. The earlier compilation had nine tracks and is missing "Two Less Lonely People in the World", "Keeping the Love Alive" and "Now and Forever".

== Track listing ==
All tracks are written by Graham Russell, unless otherwise indicated.

No.	Title	Length
1.	"Lost in Love"	3:53
2.	"Even the Nights Are Better" (Terry Skinner, J.L. Wallace, Ken Bell)	3:55
3.	"The One That You Love"	4:16
4.	"Every Woman in the World" (Dominic Bugatti, Frank Musker)	3:23
5.	"Two Less Lonely People in the World" (Howard Greenfield, Ken Hirsch)	4:03
6.	"Chances"	3:34
7.	"Making Love Out of Nothing at All" (Jim Steinman)	4:57
8.	"All Out of Love" (Russell, Clive Davis)	3:55
9.	"Here I Am (Just When I Thought I Was Over You)" (Norman Saleet)	3:47
10.	"Sweet Dreams"	3:58
11.	"Keeping the Love Alive" (Russell, Richard Supa)	3:34
12.	"Now and Forever"	3:49
