= The Whole Thing's Started =

Studio album by Air Supply
- Released: 27 July 1977
- Recorded: March 1977
- Studios: Albert Studios, Sydney
- Genre: Soft rock
- Label: CBS
- Producer: Peter Dawkins

Air Supply chronology
Air Supply (1976)	The Whole Thing's Started (1977)	Love & Other Bruises (1977)

Alternate cover
- Japanese reissue

Singles from The Whole Thing's Started
- 1. "Do What You Do" Released: June 1977; 2. "That's How the Whole Thing Started" Released: October 1977; 3. "Do It Again" Released: February 1978

The Whole Thing's Started is the second studio album by British/Australian soft rock band Air Supply, released in July 1977. The first single "Do What You Do" was released ahead of the album in June, "That's How the Whole Thing Started" followed in October and "Do It Again" appeared in February 1978. Neither the album nor the singles peaked into the Australian Kent Music Report Top 40 charts.

== Background ==
The Whole Thing's Started was produced by Peter Dawkins, and was released in July 1977 with Brenton White replaced on lead guitar by Rex Goh. The album spawned the singles "Do What You Do" (June), "That's How the Whole Thing Started" (October) and "Do It Again" (February 1978) but neither album nor singles charted into the top 40. From late 1977, the group supported Rod Stewart during his tour of Australia—he invited them to continue on to the United States and Canada. Their third album, Love & Other Bruises, included re-recordings of some earlier tracks, and was made mid-tour in Los Angeles in July–August and released internationally later that year on Columbia Records with Jimmy Horowitz producing. During the tour, Paul left the band with a new line-up of Goh, Hitchcock, Macara and Russell, plus Joey Carbone on keyboards, Robin LeMesurier on lead guitar and Howard Sukimoto on bass guitar. Paul, in 1980, joined fellow Air Supply bandmate McEntee in the lineup of Divinyls, fronted by Chrissie Amphlett. Air Supply performed in London supporting Chicago and Boz Scaggs.

== Track listing ==
All tracks are written by Graham Russell

No.	Title	Length
1.	"Teach Me to Run"	4:02
2.	"Do It Again"	3:35
3.	"Do What You Do"	3:47
4.	"There's Nothing I Can Do"	3:38
5.	"Ready for You"	4:28
6.	"That's How the Whole Thing Started"	4:03
7.	"Love Comes to Me"	5:51
8.	"The Answer Lies"	3:44
9.	"It's Automatic"	2:57
10.	"The End of the Line"	3:33

== Personnel ==
Air Supply members

- Russell Hitchcock – vocals
- Rex Goh – electric guitar
- Graham Russell – acoustic guitar, vocals
- Adrian Scott – keyboards
- Jeremy Paul – bass guitar, vocals
- Nigel Macara – drums

Additional musicians

- William Motzing – arranger and conductor (strings and brass)

Recording details

- Producer – Peter Dawkins
- Engineer – Bruce Brown at Albert Studios, Sydney
  - Additional Engineering – Peter Dawkins and Wyn Wynyard

Artwork

- Art Direction and Design – J. Peter Thoeming
- Photography – Patrick Jones

== Charts ==
Chart (1977)	Peak position
Australian Albums (Kent Music Report)	32

== Release history ==
Date	Region	Label	Format	Catalog	Notes
1977	Australia	CBS	LP	SBP 234999	
1977	Australia	CBS	2LP	SBP 241031	Repackaged with Air Supply
1977	Australia	CBS	CAS	PC 4999	
1977	Australia	Rainbow	CAS	RSV-001	
1977	Australia	Summit/Rainbow	CAS	SUL 3001	
1980	Japan	Epic/Sony	LP	25•3P-238	Japanese reissue, alternate cover
1981	Australia	Harmony	LP	HC 15070	Love and Other Bruises compilation, includes six tracks from The Whole Thing's Started
1981	Australia	Harmony	CAS	TCHC 15070	Love and Other Bruises compilation, includes six tracks from The Whole Thing's Started
1981	Australia	Summit/Rainbow	CAS	SC 3036	Love and Other Bruises compilation, includes six tracks from The Whole Thing's Started
1988	Australia	Columbia/Sony	CD	463016 2	Love and Other Bruises compilation, includes six tracks from The Whole Thing's Started
1988	Australia	CBS/Disctronics	CD	463016 2	Reissue of 1981 compilation, alternate cover
1988	Australia	CBS	CAS	463016 4	Reissue of 1981 compilation, alternate cover
1991	Japan	Epic/Sony	CD	ESCA 5390	First appearance of full album on CD
1992	Australia	Rainbow	2CD	2RCD 111/112	Feel the Breeze, includes Air Supply and The Whole Thing's Started
1996	Korea	Columbia/Sony	CD	486553.2	Once Upon a Time, includes five tracks from The Whole Thing's Started
1996	Korea	Columbia/Sony	CAS	486553.4	Once Upon a Time, includes five tracks from The Whole Thing's Started
2002	Japan	Epic	CD	EICP 7033	Reissue of 1991 release
