= News from Nowhere (Air Supply album) =

1995 studio album by Air Supply

Studio album by Air Supply
- Released: 11 April 1995
- Recorded: 1994
- Studios: A&M Studios and Conway Studios (Hollywood, California); Sound Chamber Recorders (North Hollywood, California); Chapel Studios (Los Angeles, California); Milagro Sound Recorders (Glendale, California); The Enterprise (Burbank, California); L.A. East Studios (Salt Lake City, Utah)
- Genre: Soft rock
- Length: 52:10
- Label: Giant Records
- Producer: Graham Russell

Air Supply chronology
The Vanishing Race (1993)	News from Nowhere (1995)	Greatest Hits Live ... Now and Forever (1995)

News from Nowhere is the thirteenth studio album by British/Australian soft rock duo Air Supply, released in 1995. The album marks a turn for the band from pop to more adult-oriented themes. The single "Someone" reached #60 in US Adult Contemporary charts. The interpretation of the song "Unchained Melody" and single "Always" both have become favourites in the band's repertoire.

== Reception ==
Professional ratings
Review scores
Source	Rating
AllMusic	2/5 stars

AllMusic's Stephen Thomas Erlewine felt it was a "carefully crafted piece of adult contemporary pop, but it lacks memorable songs and suffers from several uninspired performances."

== Track listing ==
No.	Title	Writer(s)	Length
1.	"Someone"	Guy Allison, Graham Russell	5:12
2.	"Just Between the Lines"	Russell, Rex Goh	4:03
3.	"Heart of the Rose"	Russell	5:36
4.	"Unchained Melody"	Alex North, Hy Zaret	3:43
5.	"Feel for Your Love"	Russell, Billy Sherwood, Marty Walsh	5:21
6.	"News from Nowhere"	Russell	6:10
7.	"Always"	Allison, Russell, Michael Sherwood	4:12
8.	"Can't Stop the Rain"	Allison, Russell	4:17
9.	"Primitive Man"	Allison, Russell	5:04
10.	"Spirit of Love"	Russell, Benny Andersson, Björn Ulvaeus, B. Sherwood	4:30
11.	"I Know You Better Than You Think"	Russell, Johann Sebastian Bach	4:02
Total length:			52:10

== Personnel ==
- Russell Hitchcock – vocals, harmony vocals (4)
- Graham Russell – vocals (1–3, 5, 6, 8–11), acoustic guitar (1, 3–6, 10, 11), nylon guitar (2), harmony vocals (4), additional nylon guitar (8)
- Guy Allison – acoustic piano (1–4, 6, 8–10), keyboards (1, 4, 8–10), African drums (1), string arrangements (8)
- Hans Zermuehlen – additional keyboards (3), harmonium (11), strings (11)
- Michael Ruff – Hammond B3 organ (5)
- Rob Mullins – additional keyboards (10)
- Michael Thompson – electric guitar (1, 8), guitars (7), dobro (8), nylon guitar (8)
- Marty Walsh – guitars (3, 4, 9), electric guitar (5, 10)
- Larry Antonino – bass (1, 3, 6–10)
- Billy Sherwood – bass (4, 5), drum programming (5), backing vocals (5, 10), acoustic piano (7), keyboards (7), electric guitar (10)
- Mark Towner Williams – talking drum (1), additional percussion (1), drums (3, 4, 7–10), percussion (5, 8)
- Paulinho da Costa – percussion (1, 6, 8)
- Martin Tillman – cello (1, 8, 10)
- Lili Haydn – violin (8, 10)
- John Philip Shenale – string arrangements (2, 3, 7, 9)
- Scott Smalley – string conductor (2, 3, 7, 9)
- Michael Sherwood – backing vocals (1, 10, 11)
- C.C. White – backing vocals (8)

== Production ==
- Graham Russell – producer
- Alejandro Rodriguez – mixing, engineer (1–3, 5–11)
- Billy Sherwood – engineer (4)
- Pat Karamian – recording assistant
- Manny Marroquin – recording assistant
- James McIlvery – recording assistant
- Krish Sharma – recording assistant
- Andy Warwick – recording assistant
- Glen Niebaur – live string recording assistant
- Jodi Russell – string dates coordinator
- Simon Russell – studio support
- Bruttars Copying Services – copyist
- George Marino – mastering at Sterling Sound (New York City, New York)
- Heather Laurie – art direction
- Chris Reisig – photography
- Lisa Taylor – photography
- Beth Goodman – stylist
- Katrina Borgstrom – hair, make-up
- Barry Siegel – management
