= The Book of Love (album) =

1997 studio album by Air Supply

Studio album by Air Supply
- Released: 9 December 1997
- Recorded: 1997
- Studio: Runs with the Wild (Utah); L.A. East Studios (Salt Lake City, Utah); Westlake Studios (Los Angeles, California); SBX Studios (Melbourne, Australia)
- Genre: Soft rock, adult contemporary
- Length: 51:00
- Label: Giant Records
- Producer: Sageman for A Nice Pear Inc.

Air Supply chronology
Now and Forever...Greatest Hits Live (1995)	The Book of Love (1997)	The Definitive Collection (1999)

Professional ratings
Review scores
Source	Rating
AllMusic	Link

The Book of Love is the fourteenth studio album by British/Australian soft rock duo Air Supply, released in 1997. The album mainly focuses on mature adult contemporary songs.

== Background ==
The writing of songs on the album began during their Asian tour on 1995, with the song "Mother Said" being demonstrated by Graham Russell at their room in a hotel on Taipei, Taiwan. It was shown on their interactive CD-ROM titled As Close As This.

Though the album didn't have any chart entries, the singles "So Much Love" and "When I Say" have gained critical acclaim in USA, although in Asia the single "Strong Strong Wind" was a big hit. The latter song was also recorded by the American band Heart for their 1998 compilation Greatest Hits.

== Track listing ==
All tracks are written by Graham Russell, except where noted.

No.	Title	Writer(s)	Length
1.	"The Book of Love"		4:50
2.	"Strong, Strong Wind"	Diane Warren	4:21
3.	"So Much Love"	Russell, Tom Evans	4:14
4.	"When I Say"		5:27
5.	"We the People"	Russell, Mark Williams	3:41
6.	"Once"	Jed Moss, Russell	4:59
7.	"Let's Stay Together Tonight"	Clifford Rehrig, Russell, Noble Williams	7:56
8.	"Daybreak"		4:28
9.	"Mother Said"		3:15
10.	"Would You Ever Walk Away"		3:58
11.	"All That You Want"	Guy Allison, Russell	3:51
Total length:			51:00

== Personnel ==
Air Supply

- Russell Hitchcock – lead vocals (2, 3, 6–9), backing vocals (2, 8, 9)
- Graham Russell – keyboards (1), programming (1), acoustic guitar (1), poem (1), lead vocals (2, 4, 6, 8, 9), backing vocals (2, 8, 9), guitars (3, 6, 10), harp (8), nylon guitar (9), drum programming (10)

Additional musicians

- Jed Moss – acoustic piano (1–3, 5, 7, 8)
- Randy Kerber – keyboards (2, 4, 5, 8), strings (7)
- John Philip Shenale – strings (3), keyboards (6)
- Guy Allison – keyboards (6, 9, 10), drum programming (10)
- Rex Goh – electric guitar (1), guitars (2, 4, 6), additional guitars (10)
- Larry Antonino – bass (1)
- Abraham Laboriel – bass (1, 2, 4)
- Clifford Rehrig – bass (3, 6, 8, 9)
- Mark T. Williams – drums (2–4, 6), keyboard sequencing (4), percussion (4, 9)
- Rafael Padilla – percussion (2, 3, 9, 10)
- Paulinho da Costa – percussion (4)
- Martin Tillman – cello (6)
- The Beejeagles (Russell Hitchcock, Graham Russell and Michael Sherwood) – lead vocals (1), backing vocals (1, 3, 4, 6, 7, 10)
- The Waters Family (Julia Tillman Waters, Luther Waters, Maxine Waters Willard and Oren Waters) – backing vocals (4)

== Production ==
- Jeff Aldrich – A&R
- Graham Russell – producer
- Alejandro Rodriguez – engineer, mixing
- Tony Meador – recording assistant
- Jeff Robinette – mix assistant
- Bob Ludwig – mastering at Gateway Mastering (Portland, Maine)
- Mark T. Williams – string conductor
- Jodi Russell – Utah recording and location coordinator
- Lyn Bradley – art direction, design
- Michael Wilson – photography
- Xavier Cabrera – stylist
- Barry Siegel – management
