= The Vanishing Race =

1993 studio album by Air Supply

Studio album by Air Supply
- Released: 11 May 1993
- Recorded: November 1992 – March 1993
- Studios: Trax Recording Studios, Sunset Sound and Capitol Studios (Hollywood, California); Ground Control Studios (Santa Monica, California); Chartmaker Studios (Malibu, California)
- Genre: Soft rock
- Length: 47:23
- Label: Giant Records
- Producer: Humberto Gatica

Air Supply chronology
The Earth Is... (1991)	The Vanishing Race (1993)	News From Nowhere (1995)

Singles from The Vanishing Race
- 1. "Goodbye" Released: 1993; 2. "It's Never Too Late" Released: 1993

Professional ratings
Review scores
Source	Rating
AllMusic	2/5 stars

The Vanishing Race is the twelfth studio album by British/Australian soft rock duo Air Supply, released in 1993. Although the album failed to reach the US charts, its single "Goodbye" peaked at No. 48 on the Adult Contemporary chart. The album became especially relevant in Asia, where singles "Goodbye", which reached No. 1 in several Asian countries, and "It's Never Too Late" helped the album reach platinum certification. The album sold over 4 million copies worldwide.

== Track listing ==
No.	Title	Writer(s)	Length
1.	"It's Never Too Late"	Graham Russell, Michael Sherwood	6:01
2.	"Faith"	Rick Hahn, George Thatcher	4:53
3.	"Kiss Me Like You Mean It"	Russell, Guy Allison, Clifford Rehrig	4:27
4.	"Evidence of Love"	Steve Diamond, Chris Farron	4:40
5.	"Goodbye"	David Foster, Linda Thompson	4:05
6.	"The Vanishing Race"	Russell, Larry Antonino, Michael Sherwood	5:39
7.	"Don't Tell Me"	Russell, Jimmy Haun, Michael Sherwood	4:51
8.	"Too Sentimental"	Brad Buxer, Russell	3:54
9.	"I Remember Love"	Russell, Michael Sherwood	4:27
10.	"I'll Be Thinking of You"	Russell	4:26
Total length:			47:23

== Personnel ==
- Russell Hitchcock – lead vocals (1–3, 5, 8–10), backing vocals (1–3, 6–8)
- Graham Russell – lead vocals (1, 3–7), backing vocals (1–3, 6–9), arrangements (1, 3, 4, 6, 7, 9, 10) acoustic guitar (1, 3, 6), electric guitar (7), acoustic piano (10)
- Guy Allison – keyboards (1–4, 6, 7, 9, 10), programming (7), acoustic piano (10)
- Simon Franglen – Synclavier (1), Synclavier programming (5)
- Rick Hahn – keyboard programming (2), drum programming (2)
- Robbie Buchanan – keyboards (4, 10)
- Claude Gaudette – keyboards (5), drum programming (5, 8), Moog bass (8)
- Brad Buxer – keyboards (8), percussion programming (8)
- Michael Thompson – electric guitar (1, 3, 5, 9)
- Tim Pierce – electric guitar (2, 3, 6)
- Dean Parks – acoustic guitar (4, 5)
- Billy Sherwood – 8-string bass (1), 5-string bass (1)
- Leland Sklar – bass (3, 6)
- Neil Stubenhaus – bass (6, 7, 9)
- Clifford Rehrig – stick bass (9, 10)
- Michael Baird – drums (1)
- Vinnie Colaiuta – drums (3, 6, 9)
- Rafael Padilla – percussion (1–5, 9)
- Paulinho da Costa – percussion (6, 7)
- Steve Tavaglione – saxophone (4, 7, 8)
- Anita Sherman – backing vocals (1, 3)
- Jessica Williams – backing vocals (1, 3)
- Warren Wiebe – backing vocals (2)
- Milton "Quiltman" Sahme – backing vocals (6), Indian chant and prayer (6)
- Michael Sherwood – backing vocals (6)

== Production ==
- Graham Russell – executive producer
- Jeff Aldrich – A&R
- Humberto Gatica – producer, engineer, mixing
- Alejandro Rodriguez – engineer, mix assistant
- Felipe Elgueta – assistant engineer, production assistant
- George Marino – mastering at Sterling Sound (New York City, New York)
- Tony DeFranco – production coordinator
- Brett-Livingstone Strong – cover concept, artwork
- Dean Armstrong – photography
- Howard Kaufman – management
