= Across the Concrete Sky =

2003 studio album by Air Supply

Studio album by Air Supply
- Released: 7 July 2003
- Genre: Soft rock
- Length: 49:33
- Label: A Nice Pear
- Producer: Graham Russell

Air Supply chronology
Forever Love: 36 Greatest Hits (2003)	Across the Concrete Sky (2003)	Mumbo Jumbo (2010)

Across the Concrete Sky is the sixteenth studio album by British/Australian soft rock duo Air Supply, released in 2003 under A Nice Pear label. The single "Goodnight" received minor recognition.

== Track listing ==
All tracks are written by Graham Russell; except "A Place Where We Belong" co-written by Alejandro Lerner.

No.	Title	Length
1.	"Shadow of the Sun"	5:42
2.	"Big Cat"	4:43
3.	"Love Is the Arrow"	3:34
4.	"We Are All Children"	4:49
5.	"A Place Where We Belong"	4:57
6.	"Feel Like Screaming"	4:43
7.	"I'll Find You"	4:12
8.	"Come to Me"	5:31
9.	"I Want You"	4:50
10.	"You Belong to Me"	3:56
11.	"Goodnight"	2:36
Total length:		49:33

== Personnel ==
Air Supply

- Russell Hitchcock – vocals
- Graham Russell – vocals, acoustic guitar, electric guitar, acoustic piano, keyboards

Additional musicians

- Jed Moss – acoustic piano, backing vocals
- Alejandro Lerner – acoustic piano (5)
- Jonni Lightfoot – guitars, electric bass, electric upright bass, drums
- Mark T. Williams – drums
- Louis Clark – string arrangements
- John Philip Shenale – string arrangements
- Stina – backing vocals

== Production ==
- Graham Russell – producer, concept, mixing
- Jonni Lightfoot – engineer, mixing, digital editing
- Eddy Schreyer – mastering
- Jay Anderson – production coordinator
- Jed Moss – production coordinator
- Jody Russell – project coordinator, design, photography
- Barry Siegel – management
