= Life Support (Air Supply album) =

1979 studio album by Air Supply

Studio album by Air Supply
- Released: April 1979
- Recorded: 1978
- Studios: Trafalgar Studios, Sydney
- Genre: Soft rock
- Length: 40:24
- Label: Sony
- Producer: Charles Fisher

Air Supply chronology
Love & Other Bruises (1977)	Life Support (1979)	Lost in Love (1980)

Singles from Life Support
- 1. "Lost in Love" Released: January 1980

Life Support is the fourth studio album by British-Australian soft rock duo Air Supply, released in 1979. The album contains the original version of the later hit single "Lost in Love", which peaked at number 13 on Australian charts. "Just Another Woman" would also be re-released on the album Lost in Love. The album was reissued on CD in 1996 with a new cover.

== Track listing ==
All tracks are written by Graham Russell.

1. "Give Me Love" (4:07)
2. "Looking Out for Something Outside" (4:05)
3. "Lost in Love" (5:34)
4. "I Just Like the Feeling" (4:18)
5. "More Than Natural" (4:24)
6. "Just Another Woman" (3:38)
7. "Bring Out the Magic" (3:51)
8. "I Don't Want to Lose You" (4:09)
9. "Believe in the Supernatural" (6:14)

== Personnel ==
Air Supply

- Russell Hitchcock – vocals
- Graham Russell – vocals, rhythm guitar
- Brian Hamilton – vocals, bass
- David Moyse – lead and rhythm guitars
- Ralph Cooper – drums, percussion

Additional Personnel

- Geoff Oakes – brass
- Mike Bukovsky – brass
- Peter Walker – guitar
- Tommy Emmanuel – guitar
- Frank Esler-Smith – synthesizer
- Cos Russo – keyboards

== Charts ==
Chart (1979)	Peak position
Australian Albums (Kent Music Report)	27
