= Cheetah (band) =

Australian hard rock band

- Origin: Melbourne, Victoria, Australia
- Genre: Hard rock
- Years active: 1976–1984, 2006
- Labels: Philips, Albert/EMI
- Past members: Chrissie Hammond; Lyndsay Hammond; Mark Evans; Michael Evans; Martin Fisher; John Lalor; Scott Ginn

Cheetah were an Australian hard rock band, active between 1976 and 1984.

The mainstay members and co-lead vocalists were English-born sisters, Chrissie and Lyndsay Hammond. They released their only album, Rock & Roll Women, in April 1982. The band's single, "Walking in the Rain" (1978), peaked at No. 10 on the Australian Kent Music Report Singles Chart.

Cheetah toured Australia, the United Kingdom and continental Europe, including appearances at Roskilde in Denmark, the Nuremberg and Wiesbaden Golden Summernight Festivals in Germany and at the 1982 Reading Festival with Iron Maiden to an audience of 120,000 people. From 1982, they were based in the UK.

After disbanding in 1984, Chrissie provided vocals for Rick Wakeman while Lyndsay issued a solo album, The Raven (1997). Cheetah reformed in 2006 to perform in the Countdown Spectacular and a subsequent tour of Europe.

Australian musicologist Ian McFarlane opined that the sisters "were the archetypal 1970s sex bombs with big hair. They had tremendous, booming rock voices and were in constant demand as session vocalists."

== History ==
Cheetah were an Australian pop rock band formed in 1976 in Melbourne, by the English-born sisters, Chrissie (born 25 November 1955) and Lyndsay Hammond (born 14 May 1954). The Hammond family had emigrated to Australia on the liner Strathnaver departing Tilbury on 10 November 1958.

From 1974, Lyndsay fronted a group, Skintight, for three years and toured backing Renée Geyer before forming Cheetah. The name was chosen as they "wanted a feline image"; it was "seen as a bit racy, not right." They "adopted a sensual approach to singing and modelled their clothes on the title of Lyndsay's old band." (Skintight)

Chrissie was a member of the group Eli Flash prior to undertaking the role of Mary Magdalene, from May 1975, in the second Australian musical theatre production of Jesus Christ Superstar. There she met Russell Hitchcock and Graham Russell. While the show was still running, they formed a harmony vocal group, Air Supply, in Melbourne, with Chrissie and Hitchcock on lead vocals and Russell on guitar. Chrissie left Air Supply in 1976. Both sisters were session vocalists for various Australia-based artists, including Jo Jo Zep, Jon English, Marc Hunter, and Flash and the Pan. They also worked as a vocal duo backing Stevie Wright, Norman Gunston and Daryl Braithwaite.

Cheetah were managed by Brian de Courcy and initially signed with Philips Records, which issued their debut single, "Love Ain't Easy to Come By", in 1977—without the group's permission. They switched to Albert Music and recorded a cover version of "Walking in the Rain", originally by The Ronettes, which peaked at No. 10 on the Kent Music Report Singles Chart in October 1978 and was the 100th-best-selling single of 1978 in Australia. It was produced by Molly Meldrum (Supernaut, The Ferrets). A music video, by Chris Löfvén (Spectrum, Daddy Cool, Birtles & Goble), was also provided. Their other charting singles include "Deeper Than Love" (June 1979), "Spend the Night" (September 1980) and "Bang Bang" (August 1981).

In mid-1980, Chrissie collapsed in a Melbourne recording studio due to a "kidney infection", which had cleared up by August. When not recording or performing, Chrissie lived in Melbourne and Lyndsay in Sydney. Cheetah gained popularity in Europe, especially "Germany where the girls had a big hit with 'Deeper Than Love'", which sold 96,000 copies. During 1981, for live performances, in Cheetah the Hammond sisters were backed by Mark Evans on bass guitar (ex-AC/DC), Michael Evans on guitar, Martin Fisher on keyboards and saxophone (Swanee, Little Heroes), and John Lalor on drums (Stevie Wright Band, Swanee).

Cheetah toured across Australia, the UK and Europe, including appearances at Roskilde in Denmark, the Nuremberg and Wiesbaden Festivals in Germany, and a show at the 1982 Reading Festival, which was headlined by Iron Maiden, to an audience of 120,000 people. In April 1982, they issued their debut album, Rock & Roll Women, which was produced by Vanda & Young (AC/DC, John Paul Young, Flash and the Pan). Chrissie recalled working with Vanda & Young: "They were tough rockers but decent guys. They saw us as strong women, rather than being the tits, the teeth and the glam, they produced us as rockers, which was very innate. Our lyrics, our stage performance was very much in the male vernacular."

For the album, they used session musicians: Ray Arnott on drums (ex-Cam-Pact, Spectrum, the Dingoes), Leszek Karski on bass guitar (Supercharge), Ian Miller on lead guitar (Chetarca, John Paul Young and the All Stars), Ronnie Peel on rhythm guitar (the Missing Links, Rockwell T. James and the Rhythm Aces, the La De Da's, John Paul Young) and Mike Peters on keyboards. Australian musicologist, Ian McFarlane, felt Cheetah had "turned their attentions to AC/DC-styled hard rock with some success."

In mid-1982 Cheetah relocated to the UK. They used various local musicians: Dave Dowell, Martin Dzal, Tom Evans, Ant Glyn, Rod Roche, Eddie Sparrow and Chris West. The group broke up in 1984. McFarlane opined that the sisters "were the archetypal 1970s sex bombs with big hair. They had tremendous, booming rock voices and were in constant demand as session vocalists." After disbanding Chrissie provided vocals for Rick Wakeman (from 1990 to 1998), while Lyndsay issued a solo album, The Raven (1997).

Cheetah reformed in 2006 to perform in the Countdown Spectacular and a subsequent tour of Europe.

In 2007, Lyndsay co-wrote "Higher Than Heaven" with James Blundell, which the latter issued as his country music single. At the APRA Music Awards of 2008, Lyndsay and Blundell were nominated for Country Work of the Year.

== Discography ==
=== Albums ===
List of live albums, with selected chart positions
Title	Album details
Rock & Roll Women	Released: April 1982; Format: LP, Cassette; Label: Albert/EMI (EPC 85522)

=== Singles ===
List of singles, with selected chart positions
Year	Title	Peak chart positions	Album
Year	Title	AUS	Album
1977	"Love Ain't Easy to Come By" / "Shake It to the Right"	-	non album single
1978	"Walking in the Rain"	10	non album single
1979	"Deeper Than Love"	89	non album single
1980	"Spend the Night"	31	Rock & Roll Women
1981	"Love You to the Limit"	-	Rock & Roll Women
1981	"Bang Bang"	80	Rock & Roll Women
1982	"My Man" / "Come and Get It"	-	Rock & Roll Women
