= The Earth Is ... =

1991 studio album by Air Supply

Studio album by Air Supply
- Released: 23 July 1991
- Recorded: Los Angeles, California
- Studios: A&M Studios (Los Angeles, California), Ground Control Studios (Santa Monica, California)
- Genre: Soft rock
- Length: 51:12
- Label: Giant
- Producer: Harry Maslin

Air Supply chronology
The Christmas Album (1987)	The Earth Is ... (1991)	The Vanishing Race (1993)

Singles from The Earth Is ...
- 1. "Without You" Released: 1991; 2. "Stronger Than the Night" Released: 1991

Professional ratings
Review scores
Source	Rating
AllMusic	2/5 stars

The Earth Is ... is the eleventh studio album by British-Australian soft rock duo Air Supply, released in 1991 and their first for Giant Records. It was their comeback album after taking a break in 1987.

The Earth Is ... did not reach the American charts, but it produced a worldwide tour in which the band focused on Asian countries and Latin America. The interpretation of "Without You" reached No. 48 on the US Adult Contemporary chart. "Dame Amor" is the first song by the band recorded in Spanish.

== Track listing ==
No.	Title	Writer(s)	Length
1.	"Stronger Than the Night"	Graham Russell, Michael Sherwood, David Young	4:15
2.	"Without You"	Tom Evans, Pete Ham	4:57
3.	"The Earth Is"	Russell, Sherwood	5:37
4.	"Speaking of Love"	Jimmy Haun, Russell, Sherwood, Young	4:30
5.	"She's Got the Answer"	Larry Antonino, Haun, Russell, Sherwood	5:45
6.	"Stop the Tears"	Jan Buckingham, Jaime Kyle	4:14
7.	"Dame Amor"	Haun, Russell, Sherwood	6:15
8.	"Dancing with the Mountain"	Russell, Sherwood, Young	5:28
9.	"Love Conquers Time"	Russell	5:01
10.	"Bread and Blood"	Russell	4:38

== Personnel ==
- Russell Hitchcock – lead vocals (1–4, 6–10), backing vocals (1, 3–6, 8–10)
- Graham Russell – acoustic guitar (1–3, 6, 9), backing vocals (1, 3, 4, 8–10), harmony vocals (2), lead vocals (3, 5, 7–10), drums (3), percussion (3), drum programming (3, 7), 12-string guitar (7), acoustic piano (10)
- Guy Allison – keyboards (1, 3–6, 8, 9), programming (3, 6, 8)
- David Young – keyboards (1, 4, 9), drum programming (8)
- Randy Kerber – acoustic piano (2)
- Brad Buxer – strings (2, 4), keyboards (3–6, 8), programming (3, 6, 8)
- Michael Sherwood – keyboards (5)
- Jimmy Haun – guitars (1, 3–6, 8, 9), acoustic guitar (2), electric guitar (2)
- Larry Antonino – bass (1–7, 9), backing vocals (1, 4, 5), fretless bass (8)
- Ralph Cooper – drums (1, 3, 4, 9), drum programming (3, 5–8), percussion (3)
- Michito Sánchez – percussion (7)
- Novi Novog – viola (10)
- Karen Tobin – additional backing vocals (6)

== Production ==
- Harry Maslin – producer, engineer
- James Jason – assistant engineer
- Jason Roberts – assistant engineer
- Talley Sherwood – assistant engineer
- Humberto Gatica – remixing (1, 2, 6), mastering
- Alejandro Rodriguez – remix assistant (1, 2, 6)
- Ground Control Studios (Santa Monica, California) – remixing location
- Precision Sound (Los Angeles, California) – mastering location
- Christine Cano – package design
- Valerie Lettera – cover artwork
- Dean Armstrong – photography
- B.B.G Management and HK Management – management
