= Air Supply (1985 album) =

Studio album by Air Supply
- Released: February 1985
- Recorded: Winter 1984
- Genre: Soft rock
- Length: 50:15
- Label: Arista
- Producers: Peter Collins; Bob Ezrin

Air Supply chronology
Making Love... The Very Best of Air Supply (1983)	Air Supply (1985)	Hearts in Motion (1986)

Singles from Air Supply
- 1. "Just as I Am" Released: May 1985; 2. "The Power of Love (You Are My Lady)" Released: July 1985

Professional ratings
Review scores
Source	Rating
AllMusic	3/5 stars

Air Supply is the eighth studio and second eponymous album by British-Australian soft rock duo Air Supply, released in 1985. The album was a step down in the band's sales, attaining gold certification by the RIAA and peaking at No. 26 on the US Billboard 200 chart. The single "Just as I Am" was their last major entry on the charts, reaching No. 19 on the Billboard Hot 100, while their interpretation of the Jennifer Rush song "The Power of Love" became a minor hit, reaching No. 68.

== Track listing ==
Side One
No.	Title	Writer(s)	Length
1.	"Just as I Am"	Rob Hegel, Dick Wagner	4:46
2.	"The Power of Love"	Gunther Mende, Candy DeRouge, Jennifer Rush, Mary Susan Applegate	5:22
3.	"I Can't Let Go"	Graham Russell, Billy Steinberg	4:10
4.	"After All"	Seth Swirsky	3:40
5.	"I Wanna Hold You Tonight"	Russell, Don Cromwell, Ken Rarick	3:45
6.	"Make It Right"	Russell, Cromwell, Rarick	3:48

Side Two
No.	Title	Writer(s)	Length
1.	"When the Time Is Right"	Gerald Milne	4:51
2.	"Sandy"	Bruce Springsteen	4:17
3.	"Great Pioneer"	Russell	4:11
4.	"Black and Blue"	Russell, Steinberg, Cromwell, Rarick	3:58
5.	"Sunset"	Russell	2:49
6.	"Never Fade Away"	Russell	4:40
Total length:			50:15

== Personnel ==
Air Supply

- Russell Hitchcock – vocals
- Graham Russell – vocals, guitars
- Frank Esler-Smith – keyboards, string arrangements
- Ken Rarick – keyboards
- Wally Stocker – guitars
- Don Cromwell – bass
- Ralph Cooper – drums

Additional musicians

- Bob Ezrin – keyboards
- Andy Richards – keyboard programming, synthesizer programming
- George Doering – guitars
- Grant Geissman – guitars
- Tim Thorney – guitars
- Dick Wagner – guitars
- Howard Ayee – bass, backing vocals
- Tim Ryan – bass
- Ken Sinnaeve – bass
- Jorn Anderson – drums
- Gary Craig – drums, percussion
- Charlie Morgan – drums, percussion
- Del Blake – percussion
- Marc Russo – saxophones
- Larry Williams – saxophones
- Gary Grant – trumpet
- Jerry Hey – trumpet
- Maxi Anderson – backing vocals
- Joel Feeney – backing vocals
- Chrissie Hammond – backing vocals
- Lindsay Hammond – backing vocals
- Rachel Oldfield – backing vocals
- Phyllis St. James – backing vocals
- Tata Vega – backing vocals

== Production ==
- Bob Ezrin – producer (1, 4, 7–9, 11)
- Peter Collins – producer (2, 3, 5, 6, 10, 12)
- Mark Weiss – photography
- David Arden – management
- Don Arden – management
- Jet Management – management company

== Charts ==
Chart (1985)	Peak position
Australian (Kent Music Report)	88
Canada Top Albums/CDs (RPM)	39
US Billboard 200	26

== Certifications and sales ==
Region	Certification	Certified units/sales
Canada (Music Canada)	Gold	50,000^{^}
United States (RIAA)	Gold	500,000^{^}
^{^} Shipments figures based on certification alone.
