= Love and Other Bruises =

1976 single by Air Supply

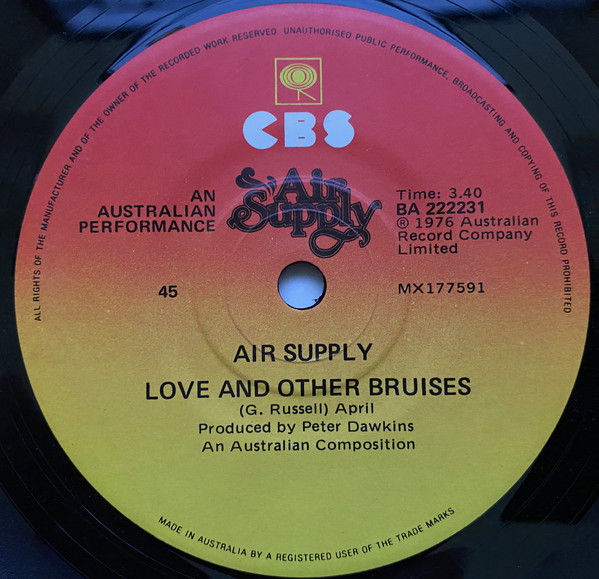

Single by Air Supply

from the album Air Supply / Love & Other Bruises
- B-side: "If You Knew Me"
- Released: October 1976
- Recorded: September 1976
- Studio: Albert Recording Studio, Sydney
- Genre: Soft rock
- Length: 3:40
- Label: CBS
- Songwriter: Graham Russell
- Producer: Peter Dawkins

Air Supply singles chronology
"Love and Other Bruises" (1976)	"Empty Pages" (1976)

"Love and Other Bruises" is the debut single by English/Australian soft rock duo Air Supply, from their 1976 self-titled debut album. The song was a top ten hit in Australia, where it peaked at No. 6. The song also appeared on the duo's third album of the same name, which was their first release in the United States.

== Track listing ==
Australia & UK 7" single
A. "Love and Other Bruises" - 3:40
B. "If You Knew Me" - 4:02

== Charts ==
=== Weekly charts ===
Chart (1976–77)	Peak position
Australian (Kent Music Report)	6

=== Year-end charts ===
Chart (1976)	Position
Australia (Kent Music Report)	92
Chart (1977)	Position
Australia (Kent Music Report)	64
