= Making Love Out of Nothing at All =

1983 single by Air Supply

"Making Love Out of Nothing At All"

Single by Air Supply

from the album Greatest Hits
- B-side: "Late Again"
- Released: July 1983
- Recorded: August 1982
- Genre: Pop rock; soft rock
- Length: 5:43 (album version); 4:53 (single version); 5:38 (video version)
- Label: Arista (US); Geffen (UK)
- Songwriter: Jim Steinman
- Producer: Jim Steinman

Air Supply singles chronology
"Two Less Lonely People in the World" (1982)	"Making Love Out of Nothing At All" (1983)	"I Can Wait Forever" (1984)

Music video
- "Making Love Out of Nothing At All" on YouTube

"Making Love Out of Nothing at All" is a power ballad written and composed by Jim Steinman and first released by the British/Australian soft rock duo Air Supply for their 1983 compilation album Greatest Hits. It reached number two on the US Billboard Hot 100 for three weeks (behind "Total Eclipse of the Heart" by Bonnie Tyler, giving Steinman a consecutive peak of two songs).

The song has been covered and sampled by other artists, such as Tyler in 1995 and rapper Cuban Link in the song "Letter to Pun" from the album Chain Reaction.

== Background and recording ==
The song is a reworking of the main title theme from the 1980 film A Small Circle of Friends, for which Jim Steinman wrote the score. It was first recorded by Air Supply, giving them a number two hit on the Billboard Hot 100 in the US for three weeks.

The song was subsequently released as a new track from their 1983 greatest hits album. The B-side of the single is "Late Again". They have included the song on their greatest hits and live albums, and recorded an acoustic version for their 2005 album The Singer and the Song.

Simultaneously, Steinman offered the song, along with "Total Eclipse of the Heart", to Meat Loaf for his Midnight at the Lost and Found album; however, Meat Loaf's record company refused to pay Steinman for the material so Meat Loaf ended up writing compositions for the album himself.

By 1983, Air Supply had changed much of its classic musician line-up, both in the recording studio and on tour. But Steinman, known for his lavish, rock-opera-ish type productions, used Bruce Springsteen's E-Street Band members Roy Bittan on keyboards and Max Weinberg on drums, to musically underscore the recording with like energies. Rick Derringer, who was previously the guitarist for the McCoys and Edgar Winter, provided the electric guitar solo.

== Chart performance ==
The song was most successful in the United States and Canada, reaching numbers two and three, respectively. It also reached the top 30 in Ireland and New Zealand. In the United Kingdom, the song was not as successful, peaking at No. 80 on the UK Singles Chart, their fourth highest charting single there overall, after "All Out of Love" (#11), "Even the Nights Are Better" (#44) and "Goodbye" (#66).

== Music video ==
Two versions of the music video for "Making Love Out of Nothing At All" were produced. The initial version is a loose homage to the lives of bands on tour life and the long distance relationships they go through during their concert tours. It begins with a couple driving to an airport; the man (Graham Russell) is "leaving for a tour" and tries to convince the woman (played by Graham Russell's real-life spouse, actress Jodi Varble-Russell) to join him:

Exterior house
Man: So, won't you reconsider?
Woman: So, won't you?

Driving to the airport
Man: Come with me, I can give you anything.
Woman: I've been there, all I want is you.

Airport tarmac
Man: But it's just one more tour, then I'll be back.
Woman: But I won't...I can't...

After the man leaves and boards the plane, a Learjet 35, the band flies off to their destination. The remainder of the video intersperses Air Supply onstage with various scenes of the man and woman's relationship. Hitchcock and Russell leave their dressing room for the stage; as they sing with the band, the woman is shown packing to leave. Nevertheless, she changes her mind and does a u-turn on the freeway, and now drives to the airport. She meets Russell at the side of the stage near the end of the song and they embrace. This version was filmed entirely in Los Angeles, with the concert sequences shot at the Forum and the airport scenes done at Van Nuys Airport.

The subsequent official version is set in 1960s New York City and involves a Marine and a young woman and the various challenges they encounter in their relationship, interspersed with scenes of the band singing the song.

== Charts ==
=== Weekly charts ===
Chart (1983–84)	Peak position
Australia (Kent Music Report)	45
Canada Top Singles (RPM)	3
Canada Adult Contemporary (RPM)	4
Ireland (IRMA)	30
New Zealand (Recorded Music NZ)	24
South Africa (Springbok)	5
UK Singles (OCC)	80
US Billboard Hot 100	2
US Adult Contemporary (Billboard)	2
US Cash Box Top 100	2

=== Year-end charts ===
Chart (1983)	Rank
Canada Top Singles (RPM)	28
US Billboard Hot 100	66
US Cash Box Top 100	27

== Certifications ==
Region	Certification	Certified units/sales
Canada (Music Canada)	Gold	50,000^{^}
New Zealand (RMNZ)	Gold	15,000^{‡}
United States (RIAA)	2× Platinum	2,000,000^{‡}
^{^} Shipments figures based on certification alone.^{‡} Sales+streaming figures based on certification alone.

== Personnel ==
- Russell Hitchcock - lead vocals
- Graham Russell - backing vocals
- Rick Derringer - electric guitar
- Sid McGinnis - acoustic guitar
- Steve Buslowe - bass
- Roy Bittan - synthesizers, piano and backing vocals
- Eric Troyer, Rory Dodd, Holly Sherwood - backing vocals
- Max Weinberg - drums

+ In initial releases of Air Supply's 1983 Greatest Hits album, Steve Buslowe was not included as the bassist in the album credits. However, this error was corrected in future pressings.

== Bonnie Tyler version ==
"Making Love (Out of Nothing at All)"

Single by Bonnie Tyler

from the album Free Spirit
- Released: 2 October 1995 (EU); 15 January 1996 (UK)
- Studio: The Hit Factory (New York City)
- Genre: Pop rock
- Length: 7:49
- Label: East West
- Songwriter: Jim Steinman
- Producers: Jim Steinman; Steven Rinkoff

Bonnie Tyler singles chronology
"Back Home" (1994)	"Making Love (Out of Nothing at All)" (1995)	"You're the One" (1995)

Music video
- "Making Love (Out of Nothing at All)" on YouTube

In 1995, Welsh singer Bonnie Tyler covered "Making Love (Out of Nothing at All)" on her eleventh studio album, Free Spirit (1995). The track was co-produced by Steinman and Steven Rinkoff, and features samples of Tyler's mother, Elsie Hopkins, singing "Un bel dì vedremo" from Puccini's opera Madama Butterfly. The accompanying music video was directed by Randee St. Nicholas.

=== Critical reception ===
AllMusic called Tyler's interpretation "fantastic, clocking in at nearly eight minutes, and seems perfectly suited for her voice. [Air Supply's] version was already great, but hers is awesome." Pan-European magazine Music & Media wrote, "Written and produced by Meatloaf's musical director Jim Steinman, Tyler does what few considered possible: singing a big ballad which goes beyond the monumental 'A Total Eclipse of the Heart'."

=== Lyrics ===
The verse immediately after the song's bridge are changed for the Tyler version, and also for the subsequent Karine Hannah version.

I can make you find your power
I can make you lose your fear
I can make your body do some very magical things
And make your inhibitions all disappear

=== Charts ===
Chart (1995–96)	Peak position
European Border Breakers Airplay (Music & Media)	5
Netherlands (Dutch Single Top 100)	17
Netherlands (Dutch Top 40)	12
UK Singles (Official Charts)	45

Chart (2020)	Peak position
UK Physical Singles (OCC)	87

=== Re-recording ===
In 2010, Tyler released a new version of the song with Canadian singer Matt Petrin.

== Rory Dodd demo version ==
A version from 1982 sung by Rory Dodd also exists. The only accompaniment is Steinman playing piano, and he includes several variations on the primary melody in the intro and bridge.

=== Lyrics ===
After the bridge, there are two verses that appear before the final two verses of the Air Supply version. The verse from the Tyler version is not included.

I can make your money double
Or I can make you lose your shirt
I can make the old wounds start to heal
Or I can make the new ones hurt

I can make the music louder
Or I can make the songs all fade
I can make every girl just wanna get up and dance
And make the boys in the band start to play

== Wendy's parody version ==
In 2007, a commercial featured two employees having lunch, where one is having a "dressed-up burger" while the other is having Wendy's. The "dressed-up hamburger" sings the chorus of the song.
