= Air Supply =

Australian-English soft rock group

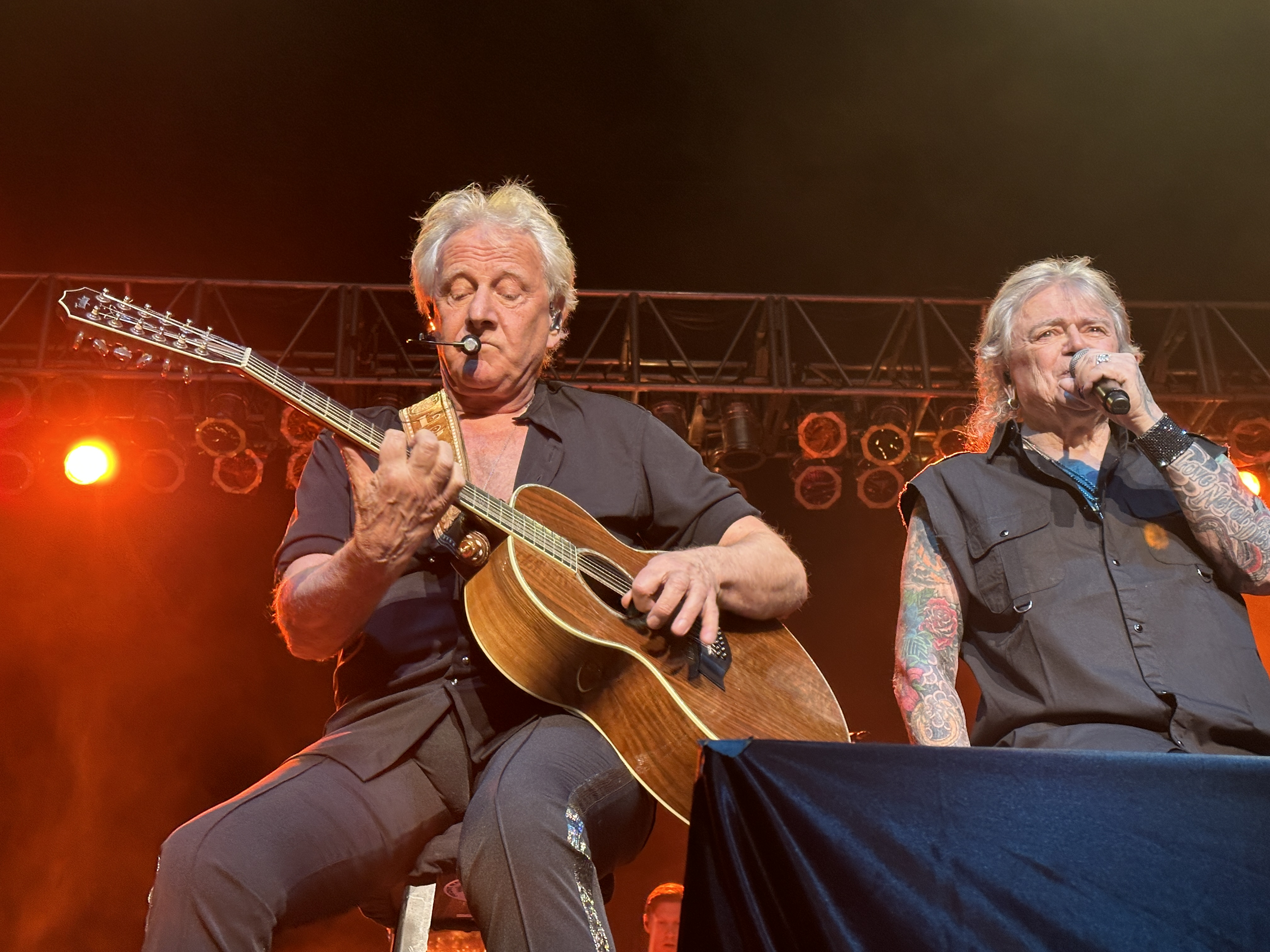
- Russell, left, and Hitchcock, right, at Paramount Theater in Denver (2023)

Background information
- Origin: Melbourne, Victoria, Australia
- Genres: Soft rock; pop rock; pop
- Years active: 1975–present
- Labels: Arista; Columbia; Warner; Giant; A Nice Pear; EMI; BMG
- Members: Russell Hitchcock; Graham Russell
- Past members: see Members below
- Website: airsupplymusic.com

Air Supply are a soft rock duo formed in Melbourne, Australia, in 1975, consisting of English singer-songwriter and guitarist Graham Russell and Australian singer Russell Hitchcock.

With record sales of 100 million worldwide, they had a succession of hits worldwide, including eight top-five hits on the US Billboard Hot 100, "Lost in Love" (1979), "All Out of Love", "Every Woman in the World" (both 1980), "The One That You Love", "Here I Am" (both 1981), "Sweet Dreams", "Even the Nights Are Better" (both 1982) and "Making Love Out of Nothing at All" (1983). In Australia, they had four top ten placements with "Love and Other Bruises" (1976), "All Out of Love", "Every Woman in the World" and "The One That You Love". Their highest charting studio album, The One That You Love (1981) reached number ten in both Australia and the US. The group, which relocated to Los Angeles in the late 1970s, has included many members, with Hitchcock and Russell at the core.

The Australian Recording Industry Association (ARIA) inducted Air Supply into their Hall of Fame on 1 December 2013, at the annual ARIA Awards.

== History ==
=== Formation and early years: 1975–1980 ===
Air Supply's founding members met on 12 May 1975, while rehearsing for the Australian production of the musical Jesus Christ Superstar. Chrissie Hammond portrayed Mary Magdalene, while Russell Hitchcock and Graham Russell were in the chorus. With the show they toured Australia and New Zealand for 18 months. In 1958, as a three-year-old, English-born Hammond had migrated to Melbourne with her family, including older sister Lyndsay Hammond, who also became a rock singer. Russell, also English-born, had been a percussionist in United Kingdom group, Union Blues, in 1965. After arriving in Australia in 1968, Russell performed solo and was later, in 1973, a member of Eli Flash with Hammond, her sister Lyndsay, Brenton White and Sam McNally later of Stylus. “Love and Other Bruises” was originally demoed by Russell, Lyndsay Hammond and Brenton White in 1974. Hitchcock left school in 1965 to work as a salesman, also joining a group, 19th Generation, on drums and vocals.

With Hammond and Hitchcock on vocals and Russell on guitar, they formed Air Supply as a harmony vocal group in Melbourne in 1975. When the show's run finished in late 1976, Hammond departed to form a hard rock group, Cheetah, with her sister. Hammond was replaced in the group by Jeremy Paul (ex-Soffrok) who provided bass guitar and backing vocals. Paul had joined the cast of Jesus Christ Superstar when it reached Brisbane and continued with the show to New Zealand. According to Paul, the group's name was "indicative of the sound and feeling forming the relationships within the band". The group's first single, "Love and Other Bruises", was released in October 1976 and peaked at No. 6 on the Australian Kent Music Report singles chart. Russell recalled that they had been unable to promote "Love and Other Bruises" while still performing in Jesus Christ Superstar, due to contractual obligations to the show. It was first aired on weekly teen pop music TV show, Countdown in early December 1976. It remains their highest charting single in Australia.

The group followed with their debut album, Air Supply, in December 1976, which reached No. 17 on the Kent Music Report albums chart and achieved gold accreditation for shipment of 20,000 copies. It was produced by Peter Dawkins (Spectrum, Ross Ryan) with the line-up of Hitchcock, Paul, Russell and drummer Jeff Browne, guitarist Mark McEntee, and keyboardist Adrian Scott. Other singles were "If You Knew Me", "Empty Pages" and "Feel the Breeze", but none reached the top 40. McEntee had left Air Supply by the end of 1976 to work as a session musician. In 1980, bandmates McEntee and Paul formed Divinyls alongside Chrissy Amphlett. Air Supply undertook a national tour in support of their debut album with Hitchcock, Paul, Russell and Scott joined by Nigel Macara (ex–Tamam Shud, Ariel) on drums and Brenton White (Skintight) on guitar. Brenton White rehearsed but did not perform with Air Supply. Later he played with Roberta Flack, Renee Geyer, Doug Parkinson and many others. In April 1977, portions of their music videos for "Empty Pages" and "Do What You Do" were screened on Countdown.

Their second album, The Whole Thing's Started, also produced by Dawkins, was released in July 1977, with White replaced on lead guitar by Rex Goh. White did not play on the album. The album provided three singles, but neither album nor singles charted in the top 40. In mid-1977, the group supported Rod Stewart during his tour of Australia, and he invited them to continue to the United States and Canada. Mid-tour they worked on their third album, Love & Other Bruises, in Los Angeles from July to August. It included re-recordings of tracks from their previous two albums, with Jimmy Horowitz producing, and was released later that year in the US on Columbia Records. At the end of 1977, Paul left and the line-up of Hitchcock, Macara, Goh and Russell, were joined by Joey Carbone on keyboards, Robin Le Mesurier on co-lead guitar and Howard Sukimoto on bass guitar. Air Supply performed in London supporting Chicago and Boz Scaggs.

Although their music had some commercial success, Russell claimed, on a 1995 DVD, that he and Hitchcock were so poor that they checked the backs of hotel sofas for change so that they could buy bread to make toast. By early 1978, the line-up was Hitchcock, Macara and Russell, with Ken Francis on guitar, Rick Mellick on keyboards and Bill Putt (Spectrum, Ariel) on bass guitar. In April of that year, Russell was considering relocating to Los Angeles: "Even though it's expensive it's the music centre of the world. In Australia you can hit yourself against a brick wall." By mid-1978, only Hitchcock and Russell remained, backed by Ralph Cooper (Windchase) on drums, and former Sailor members Brian Hamilton on bass guitar and vocals and David Moyse on guitar.

In April 1979, the band released Life Support, a concept album which included a picture disc on its first pressing. It was recorded at Trafalgar Studios, Sydney. The album had a five-and-a-half-minute version of "Lost in Love", written by Russell, which was released as a single and peaked at No. 13 in Australia and No.3 in New Zealand. The track caught the attention of Arista Records boss Clive Davis, who remixed the song and released it as a single in the US early the following year. The line-up for the album kept Hitchcock, Russell, Cooper, and Moyse, and added Criston Barker (bass guitar) and Frank Esler-Smith (keyboards) with help from other session musicians. Esler-Smith had previously known Hitchcock and Russell from working with them in Jesus Christ Superstar.

All Out of Love

A remixed version of "Lost in Love" was issued internationally as a single in January 1980 on Arista Records. The associated album, Lost in Love, appeared in March, which was co-produced by Robie Porter, Rick Chertoff and Charles Fisher. It contained three US top five singles, including the title track, which peaked at No. 3 on the Billboard Hot 100. The others were "Every Woman in the World" (No. 5) and "All Out of Love" (No. 2). The latter two singles were top 10 hits in Australia, with "All Out of Love" also reaching No. 11 on the UK singles chart and No. 17 in the Netherlands. The album had the same line-up of Barker, Cooper, Esler-Smith, Hitchcock, Moyse and Russell. It sold three million copies in the US and peaked at No. 22 on the Billboard 200. It reached No, 21 in Australia and No. 22 in New Zealand.

=== 1981–1990 ===
Air Supply's sixth studio album, The One That You Love (July 1981), was produced by Harry Maslin with the title track issued as a single in April. It is the group's only No. 1 on the Billboard Hot 100. The album provided two more US top five hits, "Here I Am (Just When I Thought I Was Over You)" (August) and "Sweet Dreams" (December). During recording, Barker left and was replaced by David Green on bass guitar, while early member Goh returned on guitar.

From 1981 Air Supply regularly appeared on US music show, Solid Gold (1980–1988). Hitchcock and Russell also filled-in as co-hosts when resident co-host Andy Gibb was unavailable. Gibb's attendance on the show became problematic and he was fired in 1982. The duo co-hosted the show in October 1983 (with Marilyn McCoo) and September 1985 (with Dionne Warwick).

Their seventh studio album Now and Forever, was released in June 1982 with the line-up of Cooper, Esler-Smith, Goh, Green, Hitchcock, Moyse and Russell; it was produced by Maslin, again. It continued the group's popularity in the US with top 5 hit "Even the Nights Are Better" (June) and two top 40 singles, "Young Love" and "Two Less Lonely People in the World" (November). On the Australian singles chart, "Even the Nights Are Better" reached the top 40 and is the group's last single to do so. It also peaked in the top 40 in New Zealand.

They released their first compilation album, Greatest Hits, in August 1983, which included a new single, "Making Love Out of Nothing at All" (July), written by Jim Steinman. The album reached number one in Australia, number two in New Zealand, and number seven on the US Billboard 200 – selling 5 million copies in the US by March 1993 according to Recording Industry Association of America (RIAA).

"Making Love Out of Nothing at All" was their equal second biggest US hit (with "All Out of Love") at No. 2, behind their only US number-one single, "The One That You Love". The band also released their first live video album, Air Supply Live in Hawaii in 1983. Their song "I Can Wait Forever", which was co-written by Russell with David Foster and Jay Graydon, was featured in a scene of the film, Ghostbusters (June 1984), and was included on its soundtrack album in the same month.

By the mid-1980s, Goh, Green and Moyse had all left, and the band's February 1985 self-titled album had Cooper, Esler-Smith, Hitchcock and Russell joined by Wally Stocker (ex-the Babys) on guitar, Don Cromwell on bass guitar, and Ken Rarick on keyboards. This album included their last top 20 Billboard hit with their rendition of Rob Hegel's 1982 single, "Just as I Am" (May 1985), which was also their last charting single in Australia. They released a cover version of Jennifer Rush's "The Power of Love" in July, which reached No. 21 in New Zealand, and they had a minor US hit with "Lonely Is the Night" from the album Hearts in Motion (August 1986) – their last US charting studio album on the Billboard 200.

Russell and Hitchcock recorded a 1987 Christmas Album, containing the holiday single "The Eyes of a Child", before taking a break as a band. During this time, Hitchcock released a solo self-titled album in 1988 which was not a big seller. However, his single "Swear to Your Heart" (1990) – from the soundtrack album for the film Arachnophobia – received significant airplay and reached the top ten on the US Adult Contemporary chart.

=== 1991–2000 ===
Using previous producer, Maslin and the returning Cooper, the duo recorded The Earth Is ..., which was released in July 1991 by Giant Records/Warner Bros. Records. It contains their rendition of Badfinger's "Without You", which reached the US Adult Contemporary top 50. Other singles from the album are "Stronger Than the Night" and "Stop the Tears". The album is dedicated to Frank Esler-Smith who had died in March of that year, from pneumonia. The official fan club released The Earth Is World Tour video, which contains live footage from the band's global tour.

They followed with their twelfth studio album, The Vanishing Race, in May 1993, which was supported by the single "Goodbye" (September), with lyrics by David Foster and Linda Thompson. Although it did not chart in Australian or the US Top 100, it was critically praised in Asia, where in many countries it reached number No. 1. In Taiwan, Power Station and Terry Lin, the latter of whom has admitted to have been influenced by Air Supply, covered "Goodbye" but renamed it "Loving you is not like loving the sea" in 2009. "It's Never Too Late" was the album's second single.

They undertook another world tour in 1993 alongside Earth, Wind & Fire guitarist Dick Smith. The album was dedicated to the plight of the Native Americans, the Vanishing Race of the album's title, and sold 4 million copies. Their third album of the decade, News from Nowhere, was released in 1995. It contained the Asian hit singles "Someone", "Always", and a cover of "Unchained Melody".

The duo's popularity continued in South-east Asia, culminating in the release of Greatest Hits Live ... Now and Forever (June 1996), a CD and DVD recording of two live concerts from mid-June 1995 in Taipei, Taiwan, which stayed at the top of the Hong Kong album charts for 15 weeks. Stephen Thomas Erlewine of AllMusic rated the album at two-and-a-half stars out-of-five and explained, "it's slick and professional... but the intent is clearly replication, not interpretation... it's not bad — it's pleasant, even — but it's not necessary." Hitchcock combined with Judith Durham (of the Seekers) and Mandawuy Yunupingu (of Yothu Yindi) for a cover version of "I Am Australian" (originally by Bruce Woodley of the Seekers and Dobe Newton of the Bushwackers), which was issued as a single in January 1997. It reached No. 17 on the ARIA singles chart.

=== 2001–2011 ===
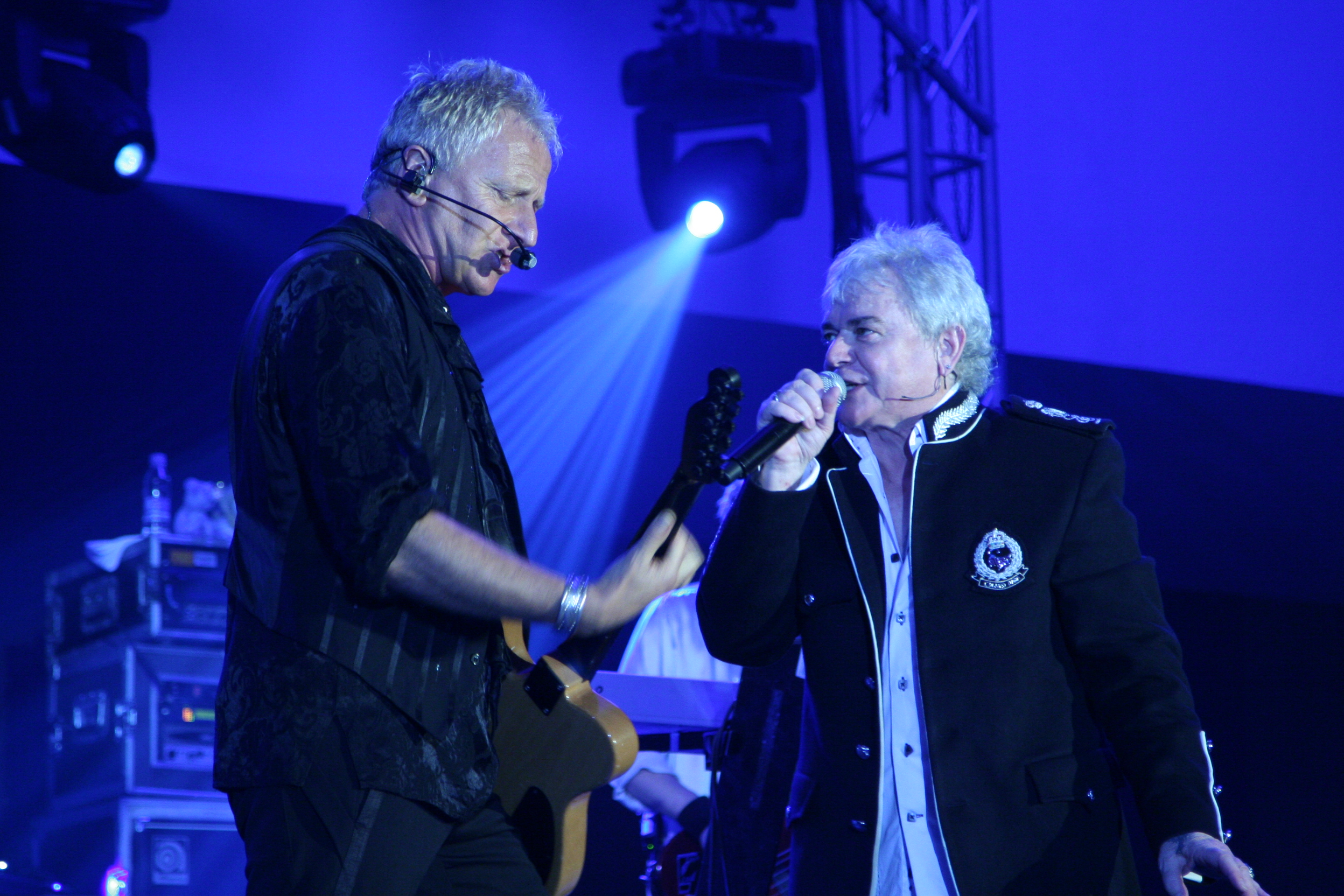
Air Supply at the Subic Convention Center, Philippines, on 12 June 2008

From the late 1990s Air Supply toured Asia and select US venues into the new millennium. They released further adult contemporary albums, The Book of Love (1997), Yours Truly (2001), and Across the Concrete Sky (2003). In 2005 they issued live albums both on CD and DVD. They performed in Havana, Cuba, becoming one of the first foreign bands invited to perform in the country. They were scheduled to perform two concerts, and played the first show on 7 July, the day before Hurricane Dennis hit the island. In high winds, that concert had an audience of 175,000. Due to the hurricane, the second show was cancelled. Fans staying at their hotel on 8 July had Russell performing acoustically for them, as there was no electricity. Songs were used in feature films Bad Company (2002), Mr. & Mrs. Smith and The Wedding Date (both 2005).

In 2006 they issued an acoustic album, The Singer and the Song. To support it they made their first trip to India in May 2006. On 2 December 2006, the duo performed to a capacity crowd in Kingston, Jamaica. This was their second visit, after performing at the Air Jamaica Jazz and Blues Festival in January. In 2007 Russell released his first adult contemporary solo album, The Future. He also made an appearance in the film Believe (2007), a comedy about multi-level marketing. In 2008 based on their chart performances, they were ranked the 83rd best musical act of all time in Billboard Hot 100's 50th anniversary edition.

In May 2010, Air Supply released Mumbo Jumbo, the duo's first studio album in eight years. It was recorded at Russell's home studio near Park City, Utah and at Odds on Records' state of the art facilities in Las Vegas with session musicians and an orchestra. It was produced by Russell and engineered by Sean O'Dwyer (Pink Floyd, Randy Newman and Blink-182). The first single "Dance with Me" reached number 28 on the Billboard Adult Contemporary chart and "Faith in Love", which peaked at number 30. The music video for "All Out of Love" is seen briefly in the 2010 Australian film, Animal Kingdom.

=== 2011–present ===
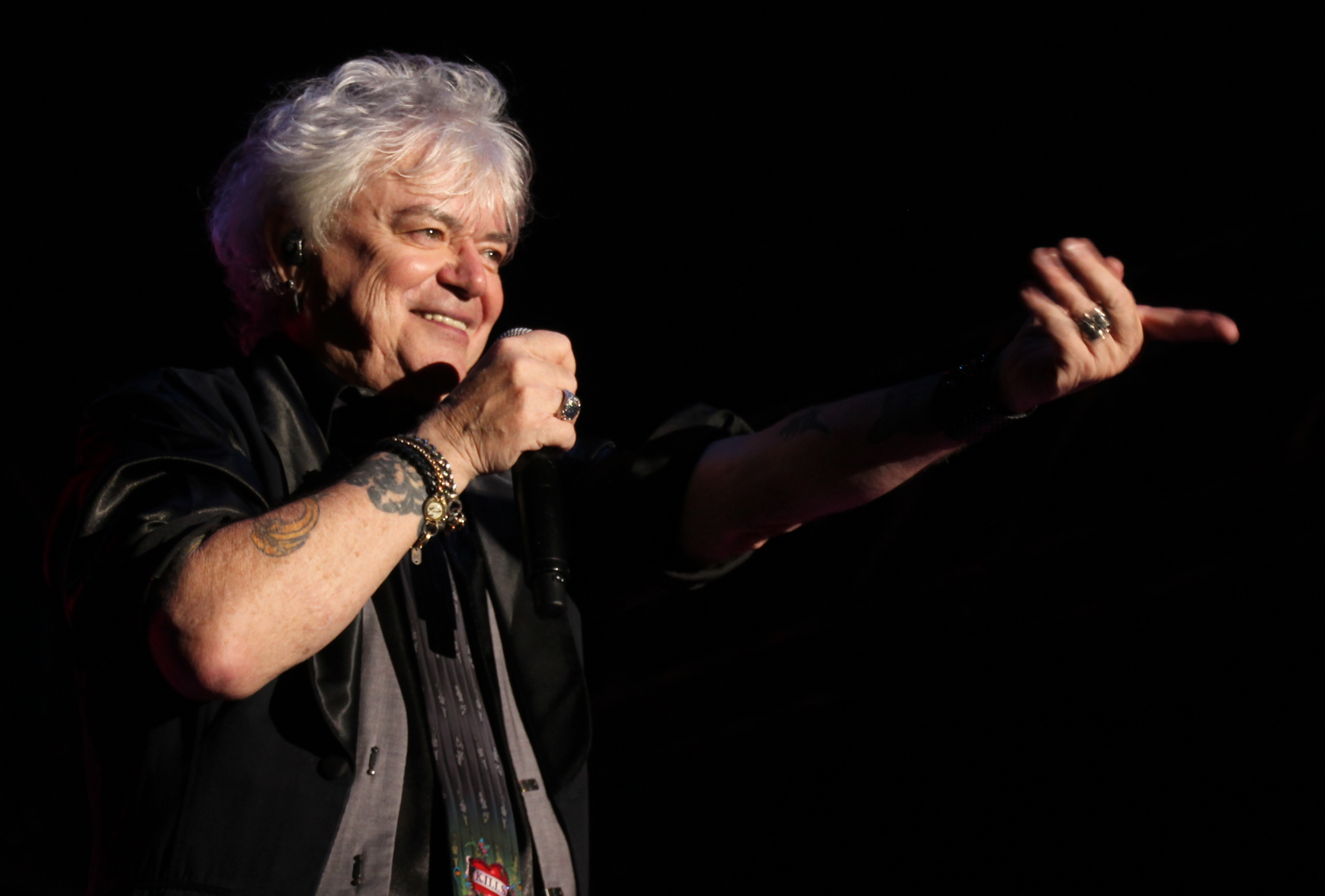
Air Supply live performance in Napa, California in 2015

In October 2012 Air Supply were honoured by Gray Line's Ride of Fame. A double-decker tour bus was dedicated to them, which roamed the streets of New York City. On 24 October 2013 the Australian Recording Industry Association (ARIA) announced that Air Supply were to be inducted into their Hall of Fame on 1 December 2013 at the same ceremony as the ARIA Music Awards of 2013. Speaking on behalf of the duo, Hitchcock declared it was a great honour for them and was totally unexpected. He continued that the pair were due to return to Australia for the ceremony and "have fun with everybody and we want to say thank you to all who participated in our ARIA Hall of Fame induction."

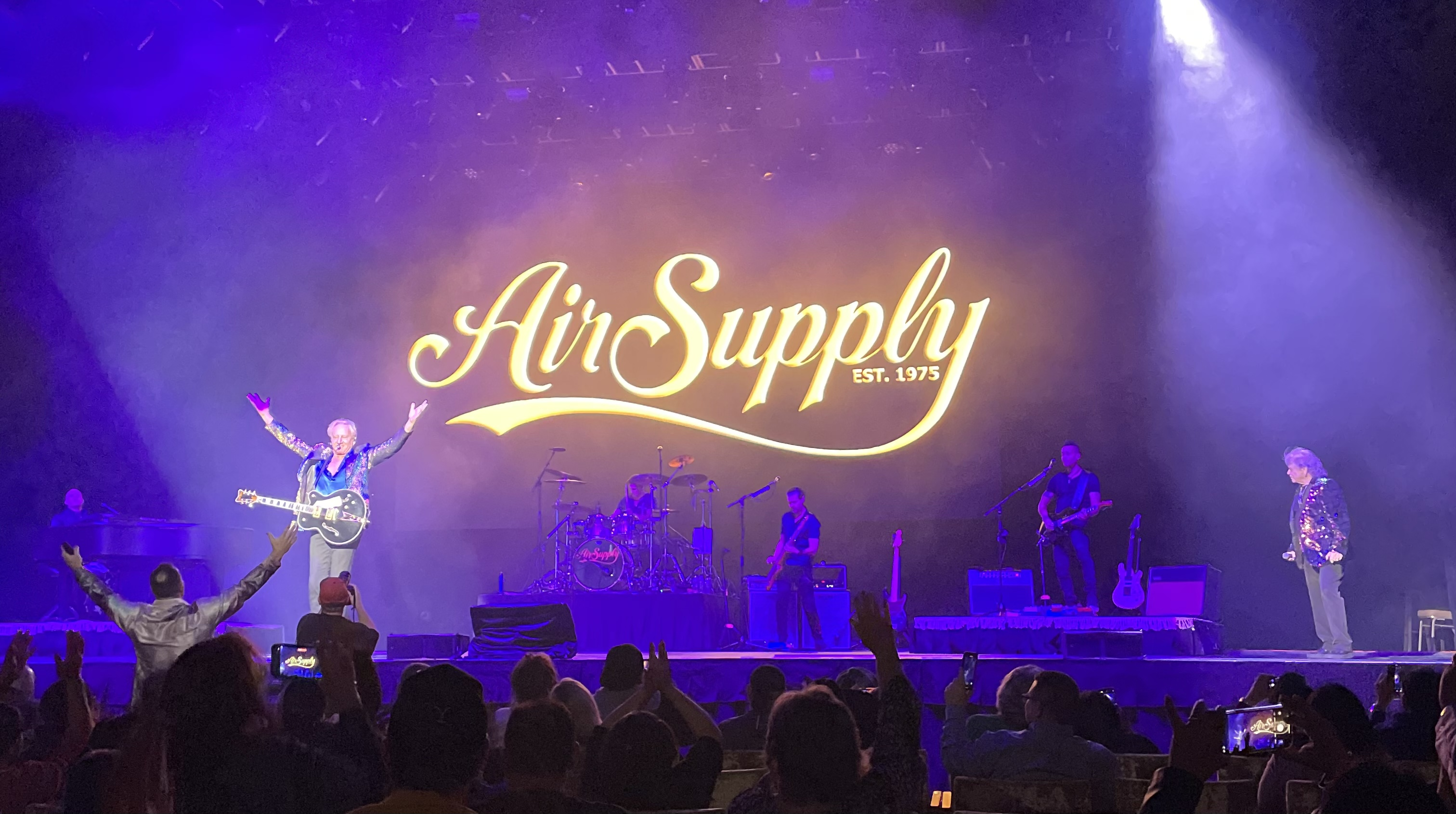
Air Supply live performance, Hard Rock Casino Sacramento, 20 January 2023

In 2014, the group were approached by the Wideboys to remix their single "Desert Sea Sky". Penned by Russell, the UK remix duo created multiple versions of the song to suit Billboard dance club DJs, clubs, radio stations and the Billboard Dance Club Songs chart. On 2 December 2014, Evolution Music Group released Air Supply's first high-definition concert film, Air Supply - Live in Hong Kong on their evosound label. The album was released on blu-ray, DVD, CD and LP formats. The concert was recorded on 11 August 2013 at Asia World-Expo, Hong Kong. It showcased new songs, "Desert Sea Sky", "Dance with Me" and "I Won't Stop Loving You", alongside their earlier hits.

"I Want You" reached number 35 on the Billboard Dance Club Songs chart in September 2015. They also released the single "I Adore You" that same month. Air Supply were scheduled to perform in Haifa on 25 November 2016 but postponed due to fires in the region. The band gave 200 free tickets to the wives of the firemen through the Haifa Fire Department workers union.

A jukebox musical based on Air Supply's songs, All Out of Love: The Musical (October 2018), was made in the Philippines. It was created and produced by Naomi Toohey and Dale Harrison, and written by Canadian playwright Jim Millan. It starred Mig Ayesa, Rachel Alejandro, Tanya Manalang, Raymund Concepcion and Jamie Wilson. It premiered at the Newport Performing Arts Theater in Resorts World Manila. It included a new song, "I Was in Love with You", written by Russell. In 2020, Air Supply were listed at number 48 in Rolling Stone Australia's list of the "50 Greatest Australian Artists of All Time".

In February 2026 their new album “A Matter of Time” was released online to fans on Facebook to download as a gift for their support. The vinyl version was made available at shows. This is in partnership with the Matter of Time tour.

== Members ==
Credits:

Current members

- Russell Hitchcock – lead vocals (1975–present)
- Graham Russell – co-lead vocals, acoustic and rhythm guitar, keyboards (1975–present)
- Mirko Tessandori - musical director, piano, keyboards (2016–present)
- Doug Gild - bass guitar (2017–present)
- Pavel Valdman - drums (2020–present)
- Jessika Soli - cello (2025–present)
- Kat Findlay - cello (2025–present)

Former members

- Chrissie Hammond – co-lead vocals (1975)
- Jeremy Paul – bass guitar, co-lead and backing vocals (1975–1977)
- Mark McEntee – lead guitar (1976)
- Jeff Browne – drums (1976)
- Bill Linnane – piano (1975)
- Adrian Scott – keyboards (1976–1977)
- Brenton White – lead guitar (1977)
- Rex Goh – lead guitar (1977, 1981–1983, 1997)
- Nigel Macara – drums (1977–1978)
- Robin Le Mesurier – lead guitar (1977; died 2021)
- Joey Carbone – keyboards, clavinet (1977)
- Howard Sukimoto – bass guitar (1977)
- Ken Francis – lead guitar (1978)
- Tim Gaze – lead guitar (1978)
- Bill Putt – bass guitar (1978; died 2013)
- Rick Mellick – keyboards (1978)
- Brian Hamilton – vocals, bass guitar (1978–1979)
- David Moyse – lead guitar, backing vocals (1978–1983)
- Ralph Cooper – drums, percussion (1978–1983, 1983-1991)
- Jamie Rogers – bass guitar (1979)
- Criston Barker – bass guitar, backing vocals (1979–1980)
- David Green – bass guitar, backing vocals (1980–1983)
- Frank Esler-Smith – keyboards (1981–1983, 1983–1986, died 1991)
- Don Cromwell – bass guitar, backing vocals (1983–1987)
- Ken Rarick – keyboards (1983–1986)
- Wally Stocker – lead guitar (1985–1986)
- Robin Swensen – keyboards, backing vocals (1986–1988)
- Greg Hilfman – keyboards, backing vocals (1986–1988)
- Tim Godwin – lead guitar, backing vocals (1986–1987)
- Jimmy Haun – lead guitar (1987–1993, 2001)
- Larry Antonino – bass guitar (1988–1994, 1997, 2000–2001)
- Michael Sherwood – keyboards, backing vocals (1988–1994, 1997; died 2019)
- David Young – keyboards (1988–1993)
- Guy Allison – keyboards (1990–1995, 1997)
- Cliff Rehrig – bass guitar (1992–2000)
- Michael Thompson – lead guitar (1992–1994)
- Mark Williams – drums, backing vocals (1992–2002)
- Hans Zermuehlen – keyboards (1993–1994)
- Billy Sherwood – bass, vocals (1993–1994)
- Jed Moss – piano (1995–2009; died 2019)
- Christopher Pellani – percussion, backing vocals (1997, 1999)
- Jonni Lightfoot – bass (2001–2016)
- Mike Zerbe – drums (2002–2011)
- Amir Efrat – keyboards (2009–2016)
- Christian Nesmith – lead guitar (2010–2011)
- CJ Burton – drums (2009–2013)
- Tiki Pasillas – drums (2012–2014)
- Aviv Cohen – drums (2014–2020)
- Derek Frank – bass guitar (2016–2017)
- Cassie Olson - cello (2025)
- Hannah Brown - cello (2025)
- Aaron McLain - lead guitar, musical director (2011–2026)

== Discography ==
Studio albums

- Air Supply (1976)
- The Whole Thing's Started (1977)
- Love & Other Bruises (1977)
- Life Support (1979)
- Lost in Love (1980)
- The One That You Love (1981)
- Now and Forever (1982)
- Air Supply (1985)
- Hearts in Motion (1986)
- The Christmas Album (1987)
- The Earth Is ... (1991)
- The Vanishing Race (1993)
- News from Nowhere (1995)
- The Book of Love (1997)
- Yours Truly (2001)
- Across the Concrete Sky (2003)
- Mumbo Jumbo (2010)
- A Matter of Time (2026)

== Awards and nominations ==
=== ARIA Music Awards ===
The ARIA Music Awards is an annual awards ceremony that recognises excellence, innovation, and achievement across all genres of the music of Australia. They commenced in 1987. Air Supply were inducted into the Hall of Fame in 2013.

Denis Handlin AM, ARIA Chairman & CEO of Sony Music Entertainment Australia & New Zealand and President, Asia said: "On behalf of the ARIA Board we are honoured to induct Air Supply into the ARIA Hall of Fame... at the 27th Annual ARIA Awards. With their many timeless songs that have crossed generations and led to ground-breaking success overseas, Air Supply are one of Australia's most unique and successful musical stories."

Year	Nominee / work	Award	Result
2013	themselves	ARIA Hall of Fame	inductee

=== TV Week / Countdown Awards ===
Countdown was an Australian pop music TV series on national broadcaster ABC-TV from 1974 to 1987, it presented music awards from 1979 to 1987, initially in conjunction with magazine TV Week. The TV Week / Countdown Awards (1979–1980) were a combination of popular-voted and peer-voted awards and were followed by the Countdown Australian Music Awards (1981–1986).

Year	Nominee / work	Award	Result
1980	Themselves (Note: The 1980 award for Most Outstanding Achievement was won by Cold Chisel, who trashed the set after their final performance during the ceremony's live telecast, held in May 1981. In the following week the show's host Molly Meldrum asked for Cold Chisel to mail their trophy to Air Supply, as "[it] should have gone to [them].")	Most Outstanding Achievement	Nominated
1981	Themselves	Most Outstanding Achievement	Won

== Tours ==
- The Power of Love World Tour (1985)
- The Earth Is...World Tour (1991)
- Always World Tour (1995)
- From the Heart Tour (2008)
- 40th Anniversary Tour (2016)
- The Lost in Love Experience (2019)
- 50th Anniversary Tour (2025)
- A Matter of Time Tour (2026)
