= Russell Hitchcock =

Australian singer (born 1949)

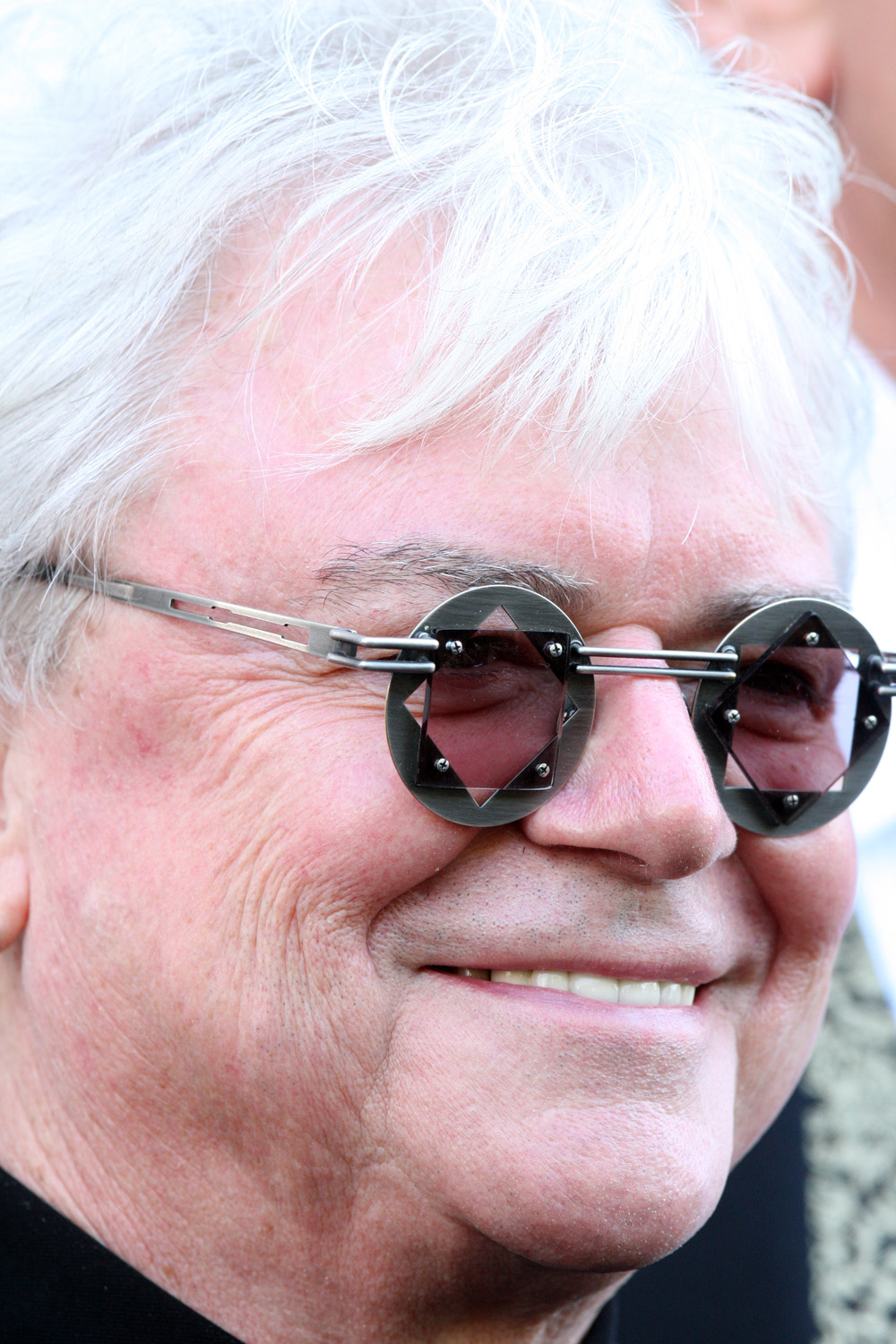
- Hitchcock in 2013

Background information
- Born: 15 June 1949 (age 77); Melbourne, Victoria, Australia
- Genre: Soft rock
- Occupation: Musician
- Instruments: Vocals; drums; percussion
- Years active: 1975–present
- Labels: Arista; Giant; BMG; EMI
- Member of: Air Supply

Russell Charles Hitchcock (born 15 June 1949) is an Australian musician and lead vocalist of the soft rock duo Air Supply.

== Early life ==
Born in Melbourne, Hitchcock attended South Brunswick State School, and later studied at Princes Hill High School in Carlton North. In 1965, he left school to work as a salesman. At that time, he played the drums and was the lead vocalist in a band called "19th Generation". At the age of 20, Hitchcock obtained a job at a computer company where he continued work for three years, before being promoted and transferred to Sydney.

== Career ==
Hitchcock met British musician Graham Russell in 1975 on the set of a production of Jesus Christ Superstar, and Air Supply was formed. The group went on to have many hit records from 1976 into the 1990s; among their biggest hits are "All Out of Love", "The One That You Love", "Here I Am", "Lost in Love" and "Making Love Out of Nothing at All".

After the band took a break in 1987, Hitchcock released several solo singles followed by his self-titled solo debut album in 1988. In 1990, the single "Swear to Your Heart" was released, which is from the soundtrack of the film Arachnophobia.

In 1991, Air Supply made a comeback with the album The Earth Is ... featuring the singles "Without You" and "Stronger Than the Night". In 1995, Hitchcock recorded a duet, "Is It You", with Rita Coolidge from her album Behind the Memories.

== Personal life ==
In the late 1970s, Hitchcock relocated to the United States. He currently resides in Los Angeles, California. In 2021, he tested positive for COVID-19, postponing two shows in Beverly Hills and Oak Grove, Kentucky.

Hitchcock became a naturalized US citizen in December 2024.

He is married to Cari Hitchcock. They married in 2021. She is an author, recognized for her children's book series The Adventures of Baby Brown Bear.

== Discography ==
=== Albums ===
List of albums, with selected details
Title	Details
Russell Hitchcock	Released: 1988; Format: CD, CS, LP; Label: Arista
Take Time	Released: 2006; Format: CD; Label: Russell Hitchcock
Tennessee: The Nashville Sessions	Released: 2011; Format: 2×CD; Label: Better Angels

=== Singles ===
List of singles, with selected chart positions
Title	Year	Chart positions		Album
Title	Year	AUS	US AC	Album
"The River Cried" / "Heart & Soul"	1987	— —	— —	Russell Hitchcock
"Dreams of the Lonely" / "Where Did the Feeling Go?"	1987	— —	— —	Russell Hitchcock
"Someone Who Believes in You" / "I Come Alive"	1988	— —	— —	Russell Hitchcock
"The Sun Ain't Gonna Shine (Anymore)" / "What Becomes of the Brokenhearted"	1988	— —	— 39	Russell Hitchcock
"Swear to Your Heart"	1990	—	9	Arachnophobia (soundtrack)
"I Am Australian" (with Judith Durham featuring Mandawuy Yunupingu)	1997	17	—	Always There (Judith Durham)
