= Graham Russell =

British musician

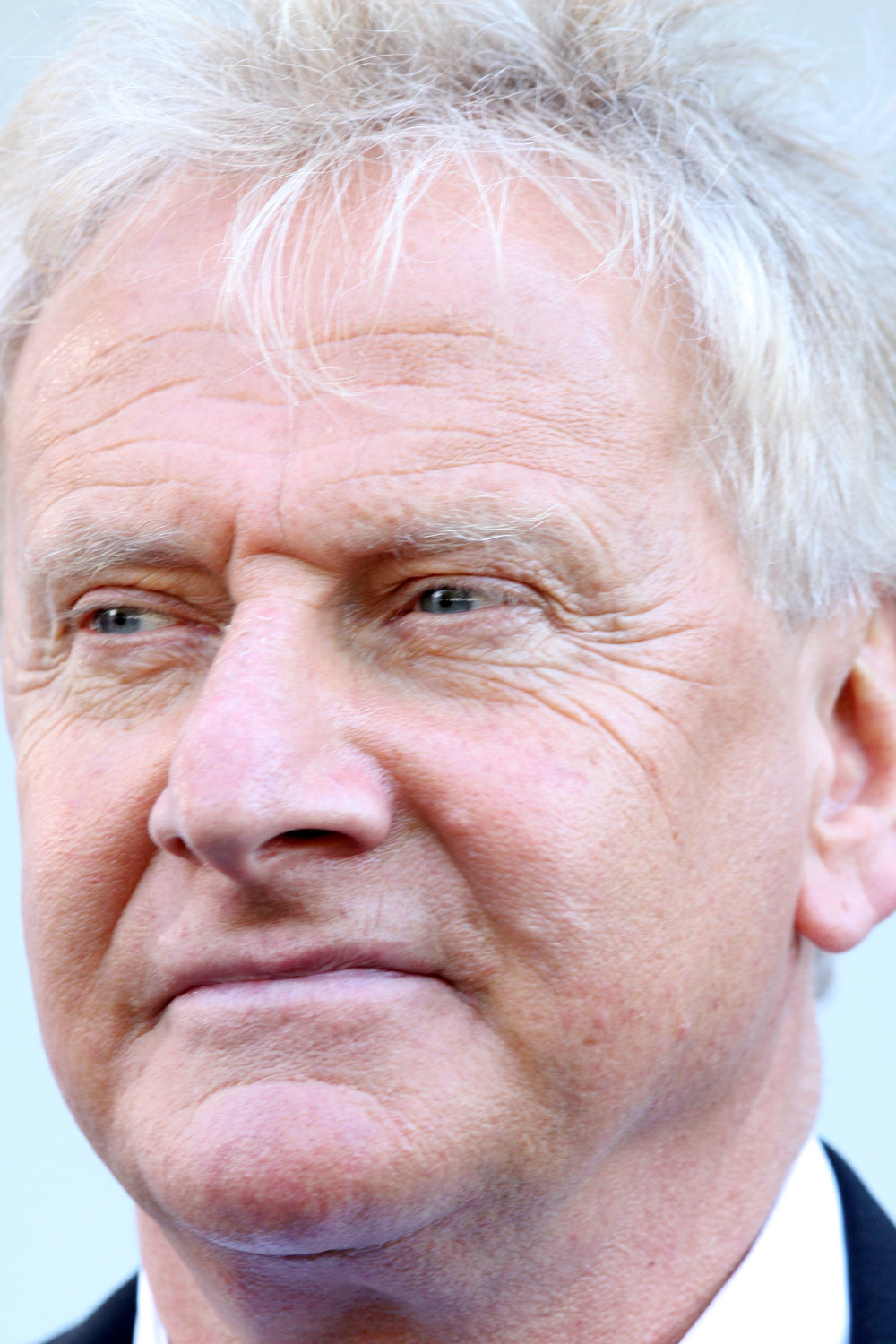
- Russell in 2013

Background information
- Born: Graham Cyril Russell; 11 June 1950 (age 76); Arnold, Nottinghamshire, England
- Genre: Soft rock
- Occupations: Musician; singer; songwriter; producer
- Instruments: Vocals; guitar; keyboards
- Years active: 1975–present
- Labels: Arista; Giant; BMG; EMI
- Member of: Air Supply

Graham Cyril Russell (born 11 June 1950) is a British musician, singer-songwriter, producer and guitarist of the soft rock duo Air Supply.

In 1975, with Russell Hitchcock, he formed Air Supply in Australia. The duo have been singing and performing romantic songs and ballads, such as "Lost in Love", "All Out of Love", "Every Woman in the World", "The One That You Love", "Even the Nights Are Better", "Goodbye" and "Making Love Out of Nothing at All", for more than 50 years.

== Early life ==
Russell was born in Arnold, Nottingham. He had a strong interest in poetry, music and books since his childhood. In 1961, at the age of 11, he started writing poems and composed his first song, called "That Rockin' Feeling".

Self-taught, he learned to play guitar and percussion alone and, after the loss of his mother in childhood, he became a loner and thereby found in music and poems a way to express his loss and his emotions.

He attended the Carlton-Le-Willows, a technical school in Gedling, Nottingham, where his love for literature and the great English poets only grew further, fueled by study and also an interest that developed on the arts of the paranormal and occult sciences, highlighted by the works of writers Shelley, Keats, and Lord Byron.

In 1963, the music of the Beatles was a strong influence that marked his life that year, and after watching a live show in 1964, Russell decided that he wanted to be a musician. Russell joined a band called Union Blues in 1965, where he played percussion, but really wanted to play his own songs in front of the stage.

== Career ==
In 1968, he moved to Australia and formed a second band in Melbourne, and began to also play solo in cafes and dance clubs, gaining ground on the Australian circuit.

In 1973, after reading spiritual and mystical content in search of knowledge and answers for several questions about life, Russell joined the rock opera Jesus Christ Superstar in 1975 and met Russell Hitchcock on the first day and became instant friends. They would sing Beatles songs together during and after shows and this would eventually lead them to form the band Air Supply.

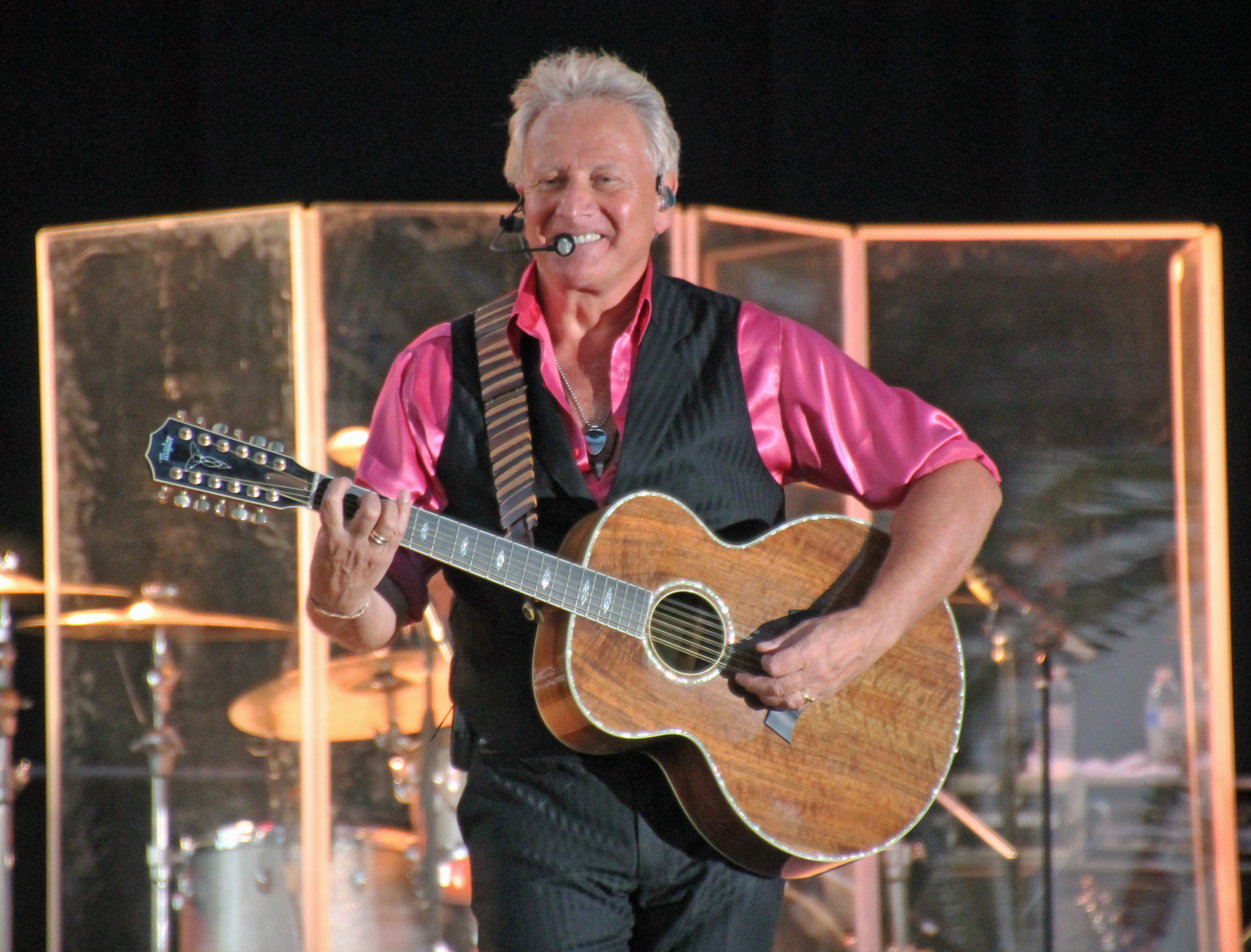
Russell performing in Napa, California in 2015 with Air Supply

After 18 months in Jesus Christ Superstar, Graham Russell and Russell Hitchcock formed the band under the name which Graham Russell had seen in a dream, a giant bright lights plate in which could be read "Air Supply". Their first single, "Love and Other Bruises", became a success. In 1976, after opening for Rod Stewart in Australia and also in the United States in 1977, Air Supply went on tour and two more hit records ensued, "Lost in Love" and "All Out of Love".

In 1979, Clive Davis heard the song "Lost in Love", and the band signed to the label Arista Records. The first single on the Hot 100, "Lost in Love", reached the top 3 in May 1980, and Graham Russell's "The One That You Love" reached the top in July 1981.

== Playing style ==
Russell plays guitar left-handed, but unusually among professionals, he plays right-handed guitars, strung for right-handed players, with the bass strings on the underside and the high strings on top, meaning unlike the majority of left-handed guitarists, he is not mirroring the fretting of a right-handed guitarist, but rather he is horizontally mirroring the chords using a unique fingering pattern. Other similar players include Karl Wallinger and Bob Geldof.

This is noticeable and obvious when he is seen playing an electric or otherwise asymmetrical guitar, as the extra cutaway space at the high end of the fret board and underside of the neck, reserved for the non-dominant left hand of a right-handed guitarist, is visible (and squandered) on the top side of the neck of his guitar. Also, the tuning pegs are on the underside instead of the upper side, and the pick guard is, uselessly, above the strings and not below them where it would usefully protect the finish from pick strikes.

== Personal life ==
In 1967, Russell married a high school sweetheart, Linda, and had a son with her the following year, Simon. Russell and Linda also had a daughter, Samantha, born in March 1972. Russell's marriage to Linda ended in 1978.

In 1981, Russell met Jodi Varble at a show and, after two years in which they exchanged correspondence only, became a couple and married in 1986, when Varble was 21 and Russell was 36. She appears as his love interest in the first music video released for the single "Making Love Out of Nothing at All".

In the late 1970s, Russell relocated to the United States. He currently lives in Park City, Utah.

== Discography ==
Solo

- The Future (2007)

Of Eden

- Feel (2013)
- Astral Love (2020)

G and the Jolly Cucumbers

- The Perfect Lover (2022)
