= All Out of Love (musical) =

Jukebox musical

All Out of Love: The Musical
- Official poster featuring the main cast
- Music: Air Supply
- Lyrics: Air Supply
- Book: Jim Millan
- Setting: 1980s New York City
- Premiere: October 18, 2018: Newport Performing Arts Theater, Manila, Philippines
- Productions: 2018 Manila

All Out of Love: The Musical is a jukebox musical based on the songs of Australian pop band Air Supply. The musical was created by producers Naomi Toohey and Dale Harrison. The musical made its world premiere at Resorts World Manila's Newport Performing Arts Theater in Pasay, Manila, Philippines on October 18, 2018. It was scheduled to run until October 28, 2018, but it was given an extended run until November 10, 2018.

== Production ==
All Out of Love is written by Canadian playwright Jim Millan and directed by Jacinta John and Darren Yap. Stephen Amos serves as the music supervisor while Yvette Lee is the musical's choreographer. The musical is produced by Naomi Toohey, Dale Harrison, and Barry Siegel. The Philippines was chosen to host the musical's world premiere due to the country being one of the largest markets for Air Supply's music.

When asked about the concept of his band's songs being made into a musical, Graham Russell said, "It was great. I think it’s overdue. I think it should have happened a long time ago. It’s really nice to see and exciting for it to be happening first in Manila. It’s like our gift here to all the fans here in the Philippines. To begin here, the journey has now begun." Russell also wrote a new song titled "I Was in Love with You" exclusively for the musical.

== Premise ==
In 1980s New York City, Jamie Crimson, a rock star at the peak of his career, is about to embark on a world tour to promote his second album when he suffers an emotional breakdown from having to split from his girlfriend Rayne. This breakdown causes a rift between him and his producer, Tommy King, to the point where he threatens to leave the music industry. Tommy's daughter Stacie, fresh out of graduating from Harvard Business School, decides to save Jamie's career and love life by helping him reunite with Rayne. Meanwhile, rival producer Kurt Swinghammer decides to take advantage of Tommy's stress disorder by proposing to buy out his record label.

== Cast ==
Character	Actor
Jamie Crimson	Mig Ayesa
Rayne	Rachel Alejandro
Stacie King	Tanya Manalang
Tommy King	Raymund Concepcion
Kurt Swinghammer	Jaime Wilson
Cabbie	Red Nuestro
Larson Bailey/Neighbor	Ariel Reonal
Helena	Raflesia Bravo
Dog Walker/Kurt Swinghammer cover	Jun Manuel Tuason
Tiny	Carlos Deriada
Crazy Fan/Stacie King cover	Helene Enriquez
Bernard	Franco Ramos
Rhonda	Japs Tropaldo
Lorrie	Mitzi Lao
Ensemble/Jamie Crimson cover	Carlos Canlas
Ensemble/Rayne cover	Gold Villar Lim
Ensemble/Tommy King cover	Juliene Mendoza
Ensemble	Eizel Marcelo
Ensemble	Hazel Grace Maranan
Ensemble	Paulina Reyes
Ensemble	Fay Castro
Ensemble	Chesko Rodriguez
Ensemble	Paul Clark
Ensemble/Dance Captain	Stephen Viñas

== Musical numbers ==
=== Original Manila production ===
Act I

- "Overture
- "Bring Out the Magic" – Company
- "Sweet Dreams" — Jamie Crimson
- "All Out of Love" – Jamie Crimson
- "I Was in Love with You" – Jamie Crimson and Rayne
- "Every Woman in the World" — Jamie Crimson and Stacie King
- "Here I Am (Just When I Thought I Was Over You)" — Tommy King
- "Keeping the Love Alive" – Jamie Crimson and Stacie King
- "Chances" — Jamie Crimson, Stacie King and Cabbie
- "Lonely Is the Night" — Cabbie and Company

Act II

- "Lonely Is the Night (Reprise)" – Company
- "Lost in Love" – Rayne
- "Two Less Lonely People in the World" – Jamie Crimson and Company
- "The One That You Love" – Jamie Crimson and Stacie King
- "Now and Forever" – Jamie Crimson and Rayne
- "Even the Nights Are Better" – Company
- "The One That You Love/All Out of Love/Lost in Love (Finale)" – Company

== Critical reception ==
All Out of Love received favorable reviews from theater critics. Robert Encila-Celdran of Broadway World commented on his review: "Surround that cast with an equally talented ensemble and a solid band, put them up on a fabulous multi-level set, provide them with a first-rate creative support, and you just might get away with a middling repertoire beloved by a multitude. And entertain the audience they did; the crowd came in droves to be affirmed, and we know them to be a big part of the journey." Fred Hawson of ABS-CBN commented that "The story is admittedly unremarkable and unoriginal, even corny and cliche at several points. But overall, the show was still very entertaining because of the karaoke familiarity of the songs (you will have to stop yourself from singing along) and the show-stopping performances of the triple-threat Filipino cast." Nikki Francisco of Theater Fans Manila gave an unfavorable review of the musical, commenting that "It’s a simple premise featuring cheesy dialogue that might have been hilarious, but the assembled cast weren’t all that funny, least of all Manalang, who would later make up for it by showing she can sing like nobody’s business in two solo numbers."

== Awards and nominations ==
=== Manila production ===
Year	Award	Category	Nominee	Result
2018	Aliw Awards	Best Actress (musical)	Tanya Manalang	Won
