= 2000 in New Zealand =

- Decades: 1980s; 1990s; 2000s; 2010s; 2020s
- See also: History of New Zealand; List of years in New Zealand; Timeline of New Zealand history

The following lists events that happened during 2000 in New Zealand.

== Population ==
- Estimated population as of 31 December: 3,873,100.
- Increase since 31 December 1999: 21,900 (0.57%).
- Males per 100 Females: 96.3.

== Incumbents ==
=== Regal and viceregal ===
- Head of State – Elizabeth II
- Governor-General – Michael Hardie Boys
Elizabeth II

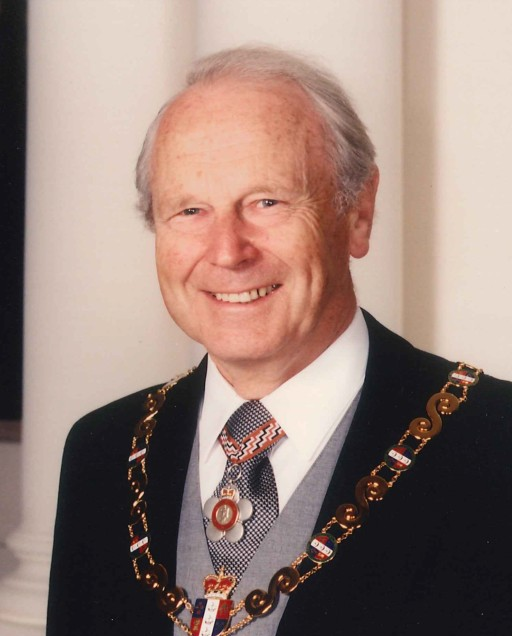
Michael Hardie Boys

=== Government ===
Legislature term: 46th New Zealand Parliament.

The Fifth Labour Government, elected in 1999, continues.

- Speaker of the House – Jonathan Hunt
- Prime Minister – Helen Clark
- Deputy Prime Minister – Jim Anderton
- Leader of the House – Michael Cullen
- Minister of Finance – Michael Cullen
- Minister of Foreign Affairs – Phil Goff
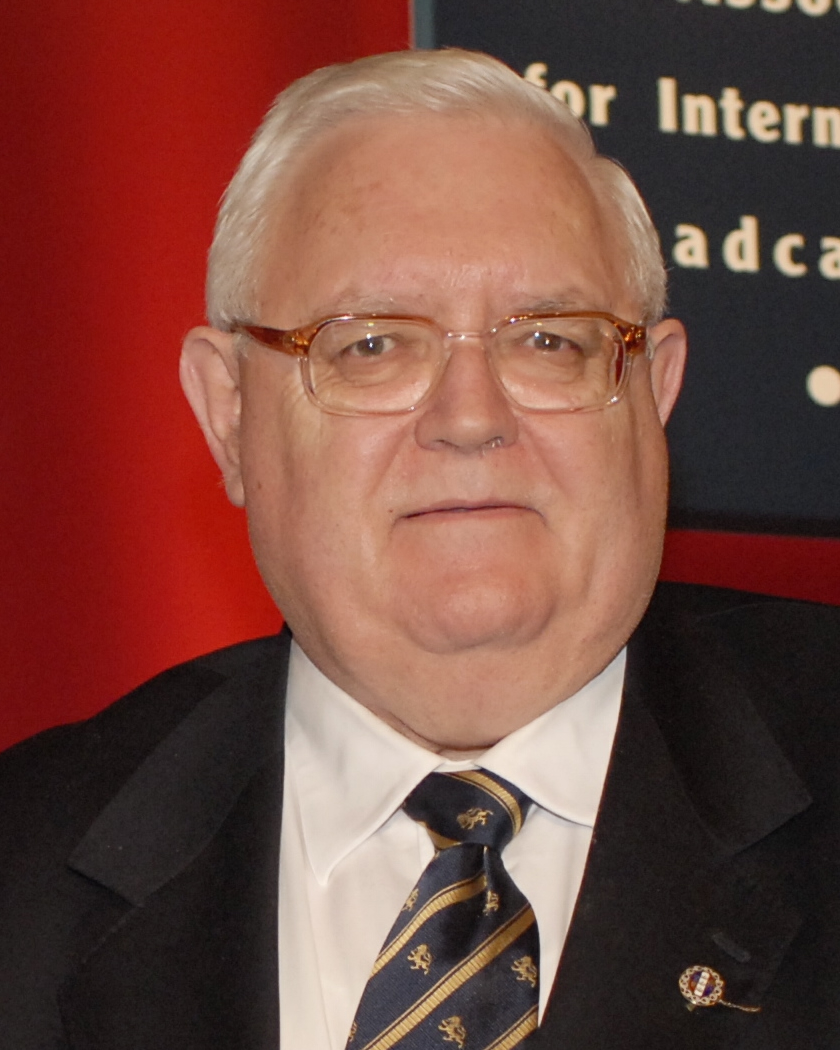
Jonathan Hunt

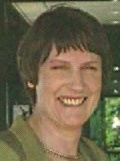
Helen Clark

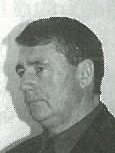
Jim Anderton

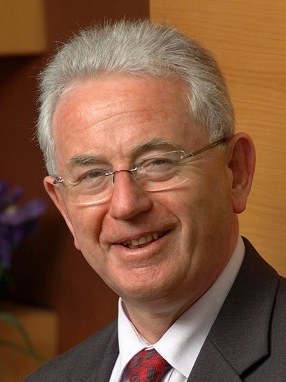
Michael Cullen

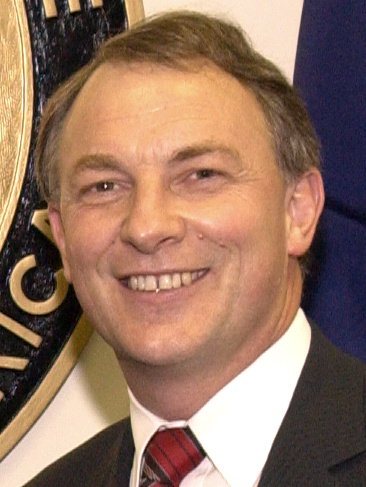
Phil Goff

=== Other party leaders in parliament ===
- National – Jenny Shipley (Leader of the Opposition)
- Greens – Jeanette Fitzsimons and Rod Donald
- Act – Richard Prebble
- New Zealand First – Winston Peters
- United – Peter Dunne

=== Judiciary ===
- Chief Justice — Sian Elias

=== Main centre leaders ===
- Mayor of Auckland – Christine Fletcher
- Mayor of Hamilton – Russ Rimmington
- Mayor of Wellington – Mark Blumsky
- Mayor of Christchurch – Garry Moore
- Mayor of Dunedin – Sukhi Turner

== Events ==
=== January ===
- 1 January – Broadcasts from the Chatham Islands and the New Zealand mainland are watched worldwide as New Zealand, by virtue of time zone, kicks off the worldwide millennium celebrations.

=== November ===
- 1 November – A magnitude 6.1 earthquake strikes north-west of Te Anau, Southland.

== Arts and literature ==
- James Norcliffe wins the Robert Burns Fellowship.
- Montana New Zealand Book Awards:
  - Montana Medal: Grahame Sydney, The Art of Grahame Sydney
  - Deutz Medal: Owen Marshall, Harlequin Rex
  - Reader's Choice: Grahame Sydney, The Art of Grahame Sydney
  - First Book Awards
    - Fiction: Duncan Sarkies, Stray Thoughts And Nosebleeds
    - Poetry: Glenn Colquhoun, The Art of Walking Upright
    - Non-Fiction: Pether Thomson, Kava in the Blood

See 2000 in art, 2000 in literature, Category:2000 books

=== Music ===
==== New Zealand Music Awards ====
This year of awards included a new category, ' Best Film Soundtrack/Cast Recording/Compilation': Winners are shown first with nominees underneath.

- Album of the Year: Stellar* – Mix
  - Shihad – The General Electric
  - Ardijah – Time
  - Salmonella Dub – Killervision
  - The Mutton Birds – Rain, Steam and Speed
- Single of the Year: Stellar* – Violent
  - AKA Brown – Something I Need
  - Shihad – My Minds Sedate
  - The Mutton Birds – Pulled Along By Love
  - Breathe – Landslide
- Top Male Vocalist: Jon Toogood – The General Electric (Shihad)
  - Dave Dobbyn
  - Don McGlashan (The Mutton Birds)
- Top Female Vocalist: Boh Runga – Mix (Stellar*)
  - Betty-Anne Monga (Ardijah)
  - Zara Clark (Deep Obsession)
- Top Group: Stellar* – Mix
  - Shihad – The General Electric
  - Deep Obsession – Infinity
- Most Promising Male Vocalist: Aaron Tokona (Weta)
  - Sama Feo (AKA Brown)
  - Conan Wilcox (Salmonella Dub)
- Most Promising Female Vocalist: Vanessa Kelly – Infinity (Deep Obsession)
  - Maybelle Galuvao (Ma-V-Elle)
  - Lavina Williams (The Invasion Band / Ma-V-Elle)
- Most Promising Group: Weta
  - Breathe
  - AKA Brown
- International Achievement: Bic Runga
  - Te Vaka
  - Shihad
- Best Video: Reuben Sutherland – My Mind's Sedate (Shihad)
  - Marc Swadel – Birthday (The Stereo Bus)
  - Jonathan King – Violent (Stellar*)
- Best Producer: Tom Bailey & Stellar* – Mix
  - Anthony Ioasa – Dream (TrueBliss)
  - Malcolm Welsford – Landslide (Breathe)
- Best Engineer: Luke Tomes – Mix (Stellar*)
  - Sam Gibson – Rain Steam & Speed (The Mutton Birds)
  - Paddy Free & Tiki Taane – Killervision (Salmonella Dub)
- Best Jazz Album: Jason Jones – Subspace
  - Mark De Clive-Lowe – Six Degrees
  - Steve Sherriff – See What Happens
- Best Classical Album: John Psathas – Rhythm Spike
  - NZ National Youth Choir – Winds That Whisper
  - Gareth Farr / NZSO – Te Papa
- Best Country Album: The Warratahs – One of Two Things
  - The Minstrel – Blaaack
  - Rosy Parsons – Pride of Place
- Best Film Soundtrack/Cast Recording/Compilation (new category): Dave Dobbyn – Overnight Success: The Definitive Dave Dobbyn Collection
  - Various – World Famous in New Zealand
  - The Exponents – Hello, Love You, Goodbye
- Best Folk Album: –
- Best Gospel Album: The Lads – Lost at Sea
  - The Invasion Band – Everything
  - The Parachute Band – Adore
- Best Mana Maori Album: Southside of Bombay – Live in Aotearoa
  - Maisey Rika – 20 Favourite Maori Songs
  - Hato Paora College – Hato Paora – 50 Years On
- Best Mana Reo Album: Iwi – Iwi
  - Maisey Rika – 20 Favourite Maori Songs
  - Hato Paora College – Hato Paora – 50 Years On
  - He Taonga Reo – Tahi/Rua'
- Best Children's Album: Jennifer Moss – Jennifer's House
  - Janet Channon & Wendy Jensen – You've Got to Clap
  - Janet Grierson and Kidz Choice Singers – Singing Is Fun
  - Tessarose Productions – Sing A Song About The Body
- Best Songwriter: Boh Runga – Violent (Stellar*)
  - Salmonella Dub – For The Love of It (Salmonella Dub)
  - Christopher Bands and Zara Clark – Cold (Deep Obsession)
- Best Cover: Shihad & Karl Kippenberger – The General Electric
  - Kimberley Renwick – Second Nature (Margaret Urlich)
  - Gideon Keith and Seven – Infinity (Deep Obsession)
- New Zealand Radio Programmer Award: Grant Hislop – (ZM / Hauraki Auckland)
  - Martin Good (Hits 89FM)
  - Rodger Clamp (More FM Auckland)

See: 2000 in music, New Zealand Top 50 Albums of 2000

=== Performing arts ===
- Benny Award presented by the Variety Artists Club of New Zealand to Doug Aston.

=== Radio and television ===
- 1 July: Public Broadcasting Fee finishes.

See: 2000 in New Zealand television, 2000 in television, List of TVNZ television programming, Category:Television in New Zealand, TV3 (New Zealand), Category:New Zealand television shows, Public broadcasting in New Zealand

=== Film ===
- Jubilee
- Stickmen
- The Lord of the Rings: The Fellowship of the Ring
- The Price of Milk

See: Category:2000 film awards, 2000 in film, List of New Zealand feature films, Cinema of New Zealand, Category:2000 films

=== Internet ===
See: NZ Internet History

== Sport ==
- See: 2000 in sports, Category:2000 in sports

=== Athletics ===
- Mark Hutchinson wins his third national title in the men's marathon, clocking 2:24:58 on 29 October in Auckland, while Melissa Moon claims her first in the women's championship (2:45:42).

=== Basketball ===
- The NBL was won by the Auckland Stars who beat the Nelson Giants, 95–78 in the final.
- The Women’s NBL was won by the Otago Breakers, who beat Waikato in the final, 75-69
- The Tall Blacks lost all five pool games at the Olympic Men's tournament, then beat Angola in the classification game to finish 11th out of 12 teams.
- The Tall Ferns lost all five pool games at the Olympic Women's tournament, then beat Senegal in the classification game to finish 11th out of 12 teams.

=== Cricket ===
- New Zealand cricket team
- The State Championship was won by the Northern Districts Knights

=== Golf ===
- New Zealand Open, Category:New Zealand golfers in overseas tournaments.

=== Horse racing ===
==== Harness racing ====
- New Zealand Trotting Cup: Yulestar
- Auckland Trotting Cup: Flight South

=== Netball ===
- Silver Ferns
- National Bank Cup

=== Olympic Games ===
- New Zealand sends a team of 151 competitors.
- The medal tally is considered very disappointing and sparks a review of high-performance sports training programmes.

Gold	Silver	Bronze	Total
1	0	3	4

=== Paralympics ===
- New Zealand sends a team of 43 competitors.

Gold	Silver	Bronze	Total
6	8	4	18

=== Rugby league ===
- The inaugural Bartercard Cup was won by the Canterbury Bulls who defeated the Otahuhu Leopards 38–24 in the grand final.
- The Auckland Warriors finished 13th of 14 teams in the NRL. The club was under severe financial pressure until purchased by Eric Watson after the season had ended and rebranded as the New Zealand Warriors.
- 27 April, New Zealand lost to Australia 0–52.
- New Zealand competed in the 2000 Rugby League World Cup, losing to Australia 12–40 in the final.

=== Rugby union ===
Category:Rugby union in New Zealand, Super 12, National Provincial Championship, Category:All Blacks, Bledisloe Cup, Tri Nations Series, Ranfurly Shield

=== Shooting ===
- Ballinger Belt – John Whiteman (Upper Hutt)

=== Soccer ===
- The New Zealand National Soccer League was relaunched as a winter competition with 10 teams and finals playoffs. The winner was Napier City Rovers.
- New Zealand placed second to Australia at the OFC Nations Cup tournament held in Tahiti
- The Chatham Cup is won by Napier City Rovers who beat Central United 4–1 in the final.

== Births ==
=== January–June ===
- 4 January – Veronica Wall, rower
- 9 January – Olivia McTaggart, pole vaulter
- 28 January – Zac Reid, swimmer
- 30 January – Benee, singer-songwriter
- 1 February – Llew Johnson, cricketer
- 7 February – Nadia Olla, association footballer
- 16 February – Matthew Palmer, association footballer
- 21 March – Max Chu, cricketer
- 24 March – Ben Lockrose, cricketer
- 1 May – Elijah Just, association footballer
- 5 May – Hannah Blake, association footballer
- 28 May – Risi Pouri-Lane, rugby sevens player
- 29 May – Chloe McMillan, freestyle skier
- 8 June – Jarrod McKay, cricketer
- 21 June – Dylan Brown, rugby league player
- 23 June – Starford To'a, rugby league player

=== July–December ===
- 10 July – Max Mata, association footballer
- 26 July – Thomasin McKenzie, actor
- 29 July – Marcus Armstrong, motor racing driver
- 2 August – Madeline Stewart, motor racing driver
- 27 August – Shylah Waikai, boxer
- 8 September – Spencer Leniu, rugby league player
- 21 September – Vengeance of Rain. Thoroughbred racehorse
- 27 September – Liberato Cacace, association footballer
- 5 October – Glamour Puss, Thoroughbred racehorse
- 13 October – Amelia Kerr, cricketer
- 21 October – Starcraft, Thoroughbred racehorse
- 26 October – Cut The Cake, Thoroughbred racehorse
- 7 November – Jesse Tashkoff, cricketer
- 12 December – Imogen Ayris, pole vaulter
- 20 December – Kyle Chen, boxer
- 29 December – Bernadette Doyle, water polo player
- 30 December – Tayla Alexander, singer

== Deaths ==
=== January–March ===
- 23 January
  - George Hoskins, athlete (born 1928)
  - Bill Sutton, artist (born 1917)
- 28 January – Lauris Edmond, poet and writer (born 1924)
- 12 February – Ray Hrstich, professional wrestler (born 1920)
- 16 February – Ian Lythgoe, public servant (born 1914)
- 19 February – Friedensreich Hundertwasser, artist, and architect (born 1928)
- 2 March – Roger Capey, field hockey player (born 1945)
- 4 March – Michael Noonan, novelist and scriptwriter (born 1921)
- 16 March – Connie Purdue, trade unionist, anti-abortion activist (born 1912)
- 18 March – Tom Ah Chee, businessman (born 1928)
- 19 March – Alison Duff, sculptor (born 1914)
- 20 March – Dame Ruth Kirk, anti-abortion campaigner, wife of Norman Kirk (born 1922)
- 24 March – Rod MacKenzie, rugby union player (born 1909)

=== April–June ===
- 1 April – Dorothy Freed, author, composer and music historian (born 1919)
- 8 April – A. K. Grant, writer, satirist (born 1941)
- 12 April – Ronald Lockley, ornithologist, naturalist, author (born 1903)
- 17 April – Beau Zam, Throroughbred racehorse and sire (foaled 1984)
- 24 April
  - John Beck, cricketer (born 1934)
  - Pru Chapman, swimmer (born 1950)
- 30 April – Gwen Rix, diver (born 1918)
- 11 May – Gwyn Evans, association footballer (born 1935)
- 12 May – Dave Crowe, cricketer (born 1933)
- 14 May – Graeme Nesbitt, music, arts and radio promoter (born 1950)
- 30 May – Maurie Robertson, rugby league player and coach (born 1925)
- 31 May – Jock Barnes, trade unionist (born 1907)
- 1 June – Angela Annabell, musicologist (born 1929)
- 8 June – Lucy Cranwell, botanist (born 1907)
- 10 June – Archibald Graham, cricketer (born 1917)
- 11 June – Guy Bowers, rugby union player (born 1932)
- 17 June – Alex Moir, cricketer (born 1919)

=== July–September ===
- 1 July – Ray Forster, arachnologist, museum administrator (born 1922)
- 7 July – Dame Stella Casey, social issues campaigner (born 1924)
- 10 July – Norma Wilson, athlete (born 1909)
- 12 July – Peter Langloh Donkin, air force officer (born 1913)
- 24 July – Basil Dowling, poet (born 1910)
- 27 July – John Stoke, occupational health pioneer (born 1928)
- 3 September – Gordon Burgess, cricket player and administrator (born 1918)
- 13 September – Ronald Hemi, rugby union and cricket player (born 1933)
- 19 September – Humphrey Gould, rower, businessman (born 1927)
- 26 September – Maurice Heenan, lawyer, public servant (born 1912)

=== October–December ===
- 3 October – Herbert Moyle, cricketer (born 1922)
- 8 October – Harold Cameron, cricketer (born 1912)
- 10 October – Ken Bloxham, rugby union player (born 1954)
- 18 October – Bruce Biggs, Māori language academic (born 1921)
- 20 October – Ken Deas, cricketer (born 1927)
- 21 October – Alan Rowe, actor (born 1926)
- 22 October
  - Iosefa Enari, opera singer (born 1954)
  - Sir Joseph Ongley, cricket player and administrator, jurist (born 1918)
- 30 October – Norman Henderson, cricketer (born 1913)
- 8 November – Patricia Bartlett, pro-censorship activist (born 1928)
- 9 November – Bos Murphy, boxer (born 1924)
- 19 November – Pearl Savin, cricketer (born 1914)
- 21 November – Frank Dennis, cricketer (born 1907)
- 26 November – James Austin, meteorology academic (born 1915)
- 18 December – Stan Fox, motor racing driver (born 1952)
- 28 December – Douglas Bagnall, air force officer (born 1918)

== See also ==
- List of years in New Zealand
- Timeline of New Zealand history
- History of New Zealand
- Military history of New Zealand
- Timeline of the New Zealand environment
- Timeline of New Zealand's links with Antarctica
