= Lost in Love =

Lost in Love may refer to:

== Film and TV ==
- "Lost in Love", a two-part episode of Degrassi: The Next Generation
- Lost in Love (film), a 2006 South Korean film directed by Choo Chang-min

== Music ==
=== Albums ===
- Lost in Love (Freda Payne album), 2000
- Lost in Love (Air Supply album), 1980
- Lost In Love (Younha album), 2010

=== Songs ===
- "Lost in Love" (Air Supply song), 1980
- "Lost in Love" (Demis Roussos song), 1980
- "Lost in Love" (New Edition song), 1985
- "Lost in Love", a 1978 song by Robin Trower from Caravan to Midnight
- "Lost in Love", a 2003 song by Kym Marsh from "Cry"
- "Lost in Love", a 2008 song by Melissa Smith featured in Command Performance

== See also ==
- Ghum Hai Kisikey Pyaar Meiin (lit. 'Lost in Someone's Love'), a 2020 Indian television series
- "Ghum Hai Kisi Ke Pyar Mein", a song by R.D. Burman, Lata Mangeshkar and Kishore Kumar from the 1972 Indian film Raampur Ka Lakshman
