= Christopher Banks =

New Zealand musician and journalist

Christopher Banks (born Christopher Rainbow in 1977) is a New Zealand journalist, musician, record producer, songwriter and film-maker.

== Music ==
=== Deep Obsession ===
Banks was responsible for eight top 30 New Zealand hits (including three #1's) for three different acts between 1998 and 2002.

In 1997, he and producer Michael Lloyd formed what would become one of New Zealand's most successful pop groups, Deep Obsession, with singer/songwriter Zara Clark and Vanessa Kelly. A year later, they were the first New Zealand act to be signed direct to Universal Music and their debut single "Lost in Love" was a number 1 hit.

The next two singles, "Cold" and "One & Only", were also chart-toppers – making Deep Obsession part of local chart history. Two more singles – "You Got The Feeling" and "I Surrender" – were top 25, spending five months on the chart between them. All four were written by Banks in collaboration with Clark or Kelly.

International releases soon followed, including a US release for the Brian Rawling remix of "One & Only". The New Zealand-platinum debut album Infinity was released in Asia, Australia and parts of Europe.

=== Nicolette ===
Nicolette Kenny, another Universal signing, was next. Banks co-produced her first top 20 hit in New Zealand, "Blue Day", (a cover of the Mi-Sex hit) in 1999 before co-writing her second single, "Harden Up", which became a top-20 Australian club chart hit in 2000. A third radio-only single, "If You Want Me", was released as an MP3 download in 2003.

Banks' writing collaboration with Nicolette Kenny has also seen the appearance of several more songs on the soundtrack of syndicated children's TV show The Saddle Club, which screens around the world. One of these, "Girl With Claws", made an appearance on the cast album Fun For Everyone.

=== Nurture ===
In 2001, Banks formed a pop duo Nurture with singer and instrumentalist Phil Madsen. Their first single "Beautiful", a Banks composition, was a top 20 hit in June 2001, staying in the singles chart for over three months. The follow-up, "Did You Do It All For Love?", broke the top 30 in early 2002.

=== Joshna ===
Folk and ethnic music artist Joshna (sometimes spelt as Jyosna, Jyostna or Jyoshna) LaTrobe has been a prominent figure on the folk and ethnic music scene in Australasia, the US and parts of Europe. She has covered many styles of music, from her experimental women's group Turiiya in the eighties, to folk and the incorporation of Indian rhythms and melodies in much of her nineties work.

Christopher Banks has collaborated with her on several albums since the late 1990s, contributing keyboards to "Sounds of Silence" (1996), "Longing" (1997), "Era Dynamic" (2001), "Reddish Blossom" (2004), and co-producing (with Michael Lloyd) the critically acclaimed "Magnificence" (2000) and "Dancing Divinity" (1999), a concept album based on a performance devised by Joshna for the ill-fated 1999 Sweetwaters Music Festival.

The radio-only single "You Are Mine" was produced by Banks and released as an MP3 download in two versions in 2002.

=== Other releases ===
His last musical release to date was the radio-only dance/pop track "I Am A Disco", performed by New Zealand drag act Reinalda and written/produced by Banks. The most successful single ever released to radio in New Zealand by a drag act, the track was also released internationally on Central Station Records official Sydney Gay and Lesbian Mardi Gras CD in 2003, as well as gaining widespread airplay on commercial radio throughout New Zealand.

He is listed as the composer on the Māori Television comedy show, B&B in 2005.

=== Award nominations ===
"Lost in Love" was nominated in the Best Technical Production category in New Zealand's 1999 Radio Awards.

Banks and Zara Clark were nominated as Songwriter(s) of the Year for "Cold" at the 2000 New Zealand Music Awards.

== Journalism ==
Banks (pictured left), with New Zealand Labour MPs Chris Carter, Lianne Dalziel, Judith Tizard, Maryan Street, former Governor General Dame Catherine Tizard, British Labour MP Ben Bradshaw, broadcaster Steve Gray and others at the 2005 Great Hero Debate in Auckland.

Between 2003 and 2006, the senior writer at GayNZ.com was Christopher Banks. His feature articles focused mainly on social and political issues relevant to the gay community, or debunking religious arguments against homosexuality. Some articles were based around in-depth interviews with political or religious leaders.

Banks' writings for GayNZ.com also included a number of film reviews, two of which caused some upset in the conservative Christian community. His review of the controversial 2002 French film Irréversible was cited by the Society for the Promotion of Community Standards in their attempts to have the film banned by the Office of Film and Literature Classification. His positive review of Kinsey, the 2004 biopic of the American sex researcher, drew the ire of Investigate magazine editor Ian Wishart, prompting a further series of articles by Banks on Alfred Kinsey.

In 2004, Banks surfaced as a writer, presenter and director on the long-running news programme Queer Nation on TV2.

== Film ==
In 2005, Banks wrote, produced and directed a low-budget digital feature, Quiet Night In, in which his former pop collaborator Nicolette Kenny played the lead role.

It screened as the closing night film at the inaugural 2005 Stratford-upon-Avon International Digital Film Festival in England, and was released on DVD in New Zealand by Arkles Entertainment in October 2007, and in Australia by Gryphon in March 2009.

His second film, Teddy, was completed in 2009 and has screened at some of the world's largest gay film festivals, including Toronto, New York, Boston and San Francisco. Teddy won the Audience Award for Best Short at the Out Takes: A Reel Queer Film Festival in New Zealand, and became the first short film from New Zealand to be shortlisted for the Iris Prize, a gay short film competition in the United Kingdom.
