= 38th Luna Awards =

2020 Philippine film awards ceremony

- Date: December 18, 2020
- Site: Online

Highlights
- Best Picture: Mindanao
- Most awards: Mindanao (5)
- Most nominations: Mindanao; Quezon's Game (9)

Television coverage
- Network: UNTV

The 38th Luna Awards ceremony, presented by the Film Academy of the Philippines (FAP), honored the best Filipino films of 2019. Because of the coronavirus pandemic, it took place online via livestream on December 18, 2020, and was broadcast on UNTV.

== Winners and nominees ==
=== Awards ===
Winners are listed first, highlighted in boldface.

| Best Picture | Best Direction |
|---|---|
| **Mindanao**; Hello, Love, Goodbye; KontrAdiksyon; Quezon's Game; Verdict | **Brillante Mendoza –** **Mindanao**; Arden Rod Condez – John Denver Trending; Cathy Garcia-Molina – Hello, Love, Goodbye; Glenn Barit – Cleaners; Matthew Rosen – Quezon’s Game |
| Best Actor | Best Actress |
| **Jansen Magpusao – John Denver Trending**; Gio Gahol – Sila-Sila; Kristoffer King – Verdict; Louise Abuel – Edward; Raymond Bagatsing – Quezon's Game | **Judy Ann Santos – Mindanao**; Kathryn Bernardo – Hello, Love, Goodbye; Ruby Ruiz – Iska; Shamaine Buencamino – Sunshine Family; Sylvia Sanchez – Jesusa |
| Best Supporting Actor | Best Supporting Actress |
| **Soliman Cruz – Iska**; Dido de la Paz – Edward; Elijah Canlas – Edward; Ketchup Eusebio – Mindanao; Topper Fabregas – Sila-Sila | **Meryll Soriano – John Denver Trending**; Angie Castrence – Iska; Dolly de Leon – Verdict; Ella Cruz – Edward; Yuna Tangog – Mindanao |
| Best Screenplay | Best Cinematography |
| **Mindanao – Honeylyn Joy Alipio**; Hello, Love, Goodbye – Carmi Raymundo, Cathy Garcia Molina; KontrAdiksyon – Njel de Mesa; Quezon’s Game – Dean Rosen, Janice Y. Perez, Anthony Macarayan; Verdict – Raymund Ribay Gutierrez | **Quezon's Game – Matthew Rosen**; Edward – Kara Moreno; Hello, Love, Goodbye – Noel Teehankee; Mindanao – Odyssey Flores; Verdict – Joshua Reyles |
| Best Production Design | Best Editing |
| **Edward – Alvin Francisco**; Hello, Love, Goodbye – Norico Santos; Mindanao – Ryan Faustino; Sila-Sila – Whammy Alcazaren, Thesa Tang; Quezon’s Game – Rowella Talusig | **Hello, Love, Goodbye – Marya Ignacio**; Edward – Joyce Bernal, Thorp Nazareno, JR Cabrera; KontrAdiksyon – Njel de Mesa; Quezon’s Game – Reuben Joseph Aquino; Verdict – Diego Marx Robles |
| Best Musical Score | Best Sound |
| **Mindanao – Teresa Barrozo**; Hello, Love, Goodbye – Jessie Lasaten; KontrAdiksyon – Njel de Mesa, Jopper Ril Johan Macaraeg; Pailalim – Teresa Barrozo; Quezon’s Game – Dean Rosen | **Cleaners – John Michael Perez Daryl Libongco**; Edward – Allen Roy Santos; KontrAdiksyon – Njel de Mesa, Therese Padua, Dominic Benedicto, Deo Van Fidelson; Pailalim – Mike Idioma; Quezon’s Game – Anglea Pereyra |

=== Special awards ===
The following honorary awards were also awarded.

- Lamberto Avellana Memorial Award – German Moreno
- Fernando Poe Lifetime Achievement Award – Arsenio Lizaso
