= Rachel Alejandro =

Filipino singer and actress

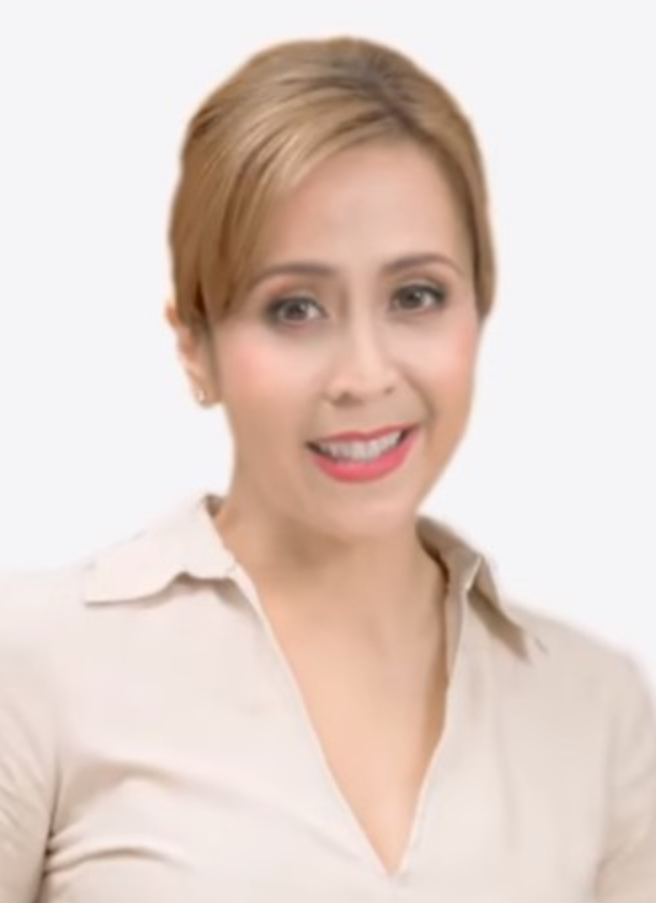
- Alejandro in 2021
- Born: Rachel Jingco Alejandro; February 18, 1974 (age 52); Manila, Philippines
- Occupations: Singer; actress
- Years active: 1986–present
- Spouse: Carlos Santa Maria (m. 2011)
- Father: Hajji Alejandro
- Musical career
- Origin: Philippines
- Website: Archived official website

Rachel Jingco Alejandro (born February 18, 1974) is a Filipino singer and actress.

== Biography ==
=== Early life ===
Alejandro's parents separated when she was four. Her mother, Myrna Demauro, then remarried and moved to the United States. Together with her father Hajji and his new partner, Rio Diaz, Alejandro and her sister Barni spent time in Manila and the US.

Her theater experience began with The Sound of Music at eight years of age, then Peter Pan at 15, Noli Me Tangere at 18, then Alikabok at 21, followed by Sino Ka Ba Jose Rizal, Larawan, and Fire Water Woman.

=== Career ===
Rachel Alejandro first entered the world of showbiz at the age of 12, when she was a host on the popular TV show That's Entertainment. At 15 from Pangasinan Province, following her successful TV stunt, Alejandro recorded her first album, Just a Minute (1989), for Alpha Records. The album spawned several hit songs including the No. 1 single "Mr. Kupido", as well as "K.S.P. (Kulang sa Pansin)" and "Kay Tagal". The album went gold and Alejandro's recording career then took off. Her second album, Watch Me Now!!! (1991), featured a revival of "Nakapagtataka", the signature song of her father, pop icon Hajji Alejandro.

Her powerful rendition of the song earned her the Awit Award for Best Performance by a Female Recording Artist and the Guillermo Mendoza Memorial Foundation Award for Best Female Singer/Entertainer. May Minamahal (1992), which contained the award-winning single "Babalik-balikan", became Alejandro's first platinum album in 1992. That same year, her career got another boost when she competed at the Golden Stag International Song Festival in Brasov, Romania, winning the award for Best Interpretation of a Romanian Song. Her 1994 album, Sentimental, featured the multi-awarded song "Paalam Na", which Alejandro co-wrote with then-boyfriend Dingdong Avanzado.

In 1996, Alejandro celebrated her 10 years in showbiz by releasing an anniversary album and appearing in her first major concert, with guests Janno Gibbs, Ogie Alcasid and the Street Boys. As Alejandro said in an interview with Maryo B Labad, "In the past years, siguro halos lahat nasubukan ko na as far as the entertainment scene is concerned. And my efforts have paid off." Her album, Tanging Pangarap, her first album for Viva Records, was released in 2001. The carrier single was written by her longtime former boyfriend Lee Robin Salazar. It also contains the 2000 Metropop Song Festival winner "Forever and a Day" composed by Angelo Villegas. Recently, Alejandro released a self-produced album under a distribution agreement with Curve Entertainment entitled Believe (2019), with original songs and cover songs from some of her stage musical projects.

Alejandro has also enjoyed success as an actress, appearing in films and theater productions. In 2001, she took the role of Mimi Marquez in a production of Rent that played in Manila and Singapore. A review from the Singapore Straits Times praised Alejandro's performance writing, "Alejandro's Mimi sounds even better than Broadway's Daphne Rubin-Vega. Her crystal clear voice is far stronger than the smokey whisper of Rubin-Vega". She starred in a run of the musical comedy Xanadu in 2010. In 2012, she starred in Atlantis Productions' Avenue Q which played at the Marina Bay Sands in Singapore. This was her fourth time doing the show as she had previously performed in several repeats of the musical in Manila. She appeared in an Atlantis Production of Aida as Amneris in June 2011 and in July 2013, she accepted the role of Justice in a repeat run of Rock of Ages in Manila.

In 2017, she starred in the musical film Ang Larawan, which she also was the executive producer, marking her comeback in film for the first time in 21 years. Her last major movie before that was 1996's Mumbaki with Raymart Santiago and directed by Butch Perez for VIVA Films. She subsequently portrayed Aurora Quezon in the 2019 film Quezon's Game which garnered her several best actress awards.

On July 1, 2018, ASAP paid tribute to her and awarded her an ASAPinoy Plaque of recognition for her contributions to OPM. On that day she together with other performers such as Lyca Gairanod, Jona Soquite, and legendary singers Zsa Zsa Padilla, Martin Nievera, and her father Hajji Alejandro, performed all her hit songs. Alejandro currently stars in the Philippine-Australian jukebox musical All Out of Love: The Musical, which is based on the songs of Air Supply.

On July 23, 2021, Alejandro became an artist for Star Magic and will star on her first teleserye called The Broken Marriage Vow.

== Personal life ==
On April 9, 2011, Alejandro married Carlos Santa Maria. She is currently residing in Makati.

== Discography ==
| Year | Album | details |
|---|---|---|
| 1989 | Just a Minute | Released: 30 October 1989; Label: Alpha Records; Formats: LP, cassette, CD, digital download, streaming |
| 1991 | Watch Me Now!!! | Released: 4 November 1991; Label: Alpha Records; Formats: LP, cassette, CD, digital download, streaming |
| 1991 | Paskung-Pasko (with Alpha All-Stars) | Released: November 1991; Label: Alpha Records; Formats: LP, cassette, CD, digital download, streaming |
| 1992 | May Minamahal | Released: 10 December 1992; Label: Alpha Records; Formats: LP, cassette, CD, digital download, streaming |
| 1994 | Sentimental | Released: 19 November 1994; Label: Alpha Records; Formats: LP, cassette, CD, digital download, streaming |
| 1995 | Alikabok (An Original Pilipino Musical) | Released: 1995; Label: Musiko Records/BMG Records (Pilipinas), Inc.; Formats: Cassette, CD |
| 1995 | Sa Araw ng Pasko | Released: 9 December 1995; Label: Alpha Records; Formats: LP, cassette, CD, digital download, streaming |
| 1996 | Perfect 10 | Released: 18 July 1996; Label: Alpha Records; Formats: LP, cassette, CD, digital download, streaming |
| 1997 | Mixed Emotions | Released: 22 October 1997; Label: WEA International/Warner Music Philippines; Formats: Cassette, CD, digital download, streaming |
| 1998 | The Very Best of Rachel Alejandro | Released: 3 January 1998; Label: Alpha Records; Formats: CD, LP, cassette, digital download, streaming |
| 1999 | Dito sa Puso Ko | Released: 1999; Label: WEA International/Warner Music Philippines; Formats: Cassette, CD, digital download, streaming |
| 1999 | All Time Hits OPM Volume 1: The Best of Rachel Alejandro & Richard Reynoso (Rachel Alejandro & Richard Reynoso; Karaoke album) | Released: 21 June 1999; Label: Alpha Records; Formats: VCD, digital download, streaming |
| 2001 | Tanging Pangarap | Released: 2001; Label: Viva Records; Formats: Cassette, CD |
| 2001 | The Very Best of Rachel Alejandro | Released: 2001; Label: Warner Music Philippines; Formats: Cassette, CD, digital download, streaming |
| 2004 | Heart's Desire | Released: 2004; Label: Viva Records; Formats: CD, digital download, streaming |
| 2008 | Greatest Hits | Released: 26 February 2008; Label: Alpha Music; Formats: CD, digital download, streaming |
| 2017 | Ang Larawan (The Official Soundtrack) | Released: 2017; Label: Star Music; Formats: LP, digital download, streaming |
| 2019 | Believe | Released: 31 May 2019; Label: Curve Entertainment; Formats: Digital download, streaming |
| 2021 | "Takipsilim" (Single) | Released: 19 February 2021; Label: Warner Music Philippines; Formats: Digital download, streaming |
| 2021 | The Great OPM Songbook Vol. 1 | Released: 29 October 2021; Label: Star Music/ABS-CBN Film Productions, Inc.; Formats: Digital download, streaming |

== Filmography ==
=== Film ===
| Year | Title | Role |
|---|---|---|
| 1990 | Hulihin si... Nardong Toothpick | Sandra |
| 1991 | Ang Utol Kong Hoodlum | Rose |
| 1991 | Angelito San Miguel: Ang Batang City Jail | Rowena |
| 1991 | Darna | |
| 1991 | Onyong Majikero | Diana |
| 1992 | Blue Jeans Gang | |
| 1993 | Pita, Terror ng Kaloocan | Estella |
| 1994 | Silya Elektrika | Gina |
| 1996 | Mumbaki | Dr. Nancy Madrid |
| 1998 | Notoryus | |
| 2010 | Take Note – episode #7: Rachel Alejandro & Geneva Cruz | Herself |
| 2017 | Ang Larawan | Paula Marasigan |
| 2019 | Quezon's Game | Aurora Quezon |
| 2025 | Song of the Fireflies | |
| 2025 | Songs for Selina | Emily |

=== Television ===
- That's Entertainment
- Saturday Entertainment
- Shades
- Lunch Date
- Eat Bulaga!
- GMA Supershow
- Ryan Ryan Musikahan
- The Sharon Cuneta Show
- Sa Linggo nAPO Sila
- ASAP Natin 'To
- Halik sa Apoy as Andie
- R.S.V.P.
- Salo Salo Together
- Katok Mga Misis
- Music Bureau (TV5)
- 'Sang Linggo nAPO Sila
- Maalaala Mo Kaya
- Pinoy Dream Academy
- Magpakailanman
- The Ryzza Mae Show
- Mars
- Real Talk
- It's Showtime
- Family Feud: That's Girls vs ASAP Sessionistas
- Tonight with Boy Abunda
- Magandang Buhay
- Minute To Win It: Last Tandem Standing
- I Can See Your Voice
- Mars Pa More
- The Broken Marriage Vow as Nathalia Lucero

== Books ==
- Sexy Chef Cookbook (December 4, 2013)
- Eat, Clean, Love (2015)
- 21 Days to a Sexier You (2017)
- Ang Larawan: From Stage to Screen (2017)
- FHM (March 2018)
- Liwayway Magasin (February 19, 2018)
- Bannawag Magasin (May 7, 2018)
- Liwayway Magasin (June 10, 2019)

== Awards ==
| Year | Award giving body | Category | Nominated work | Results |
|---|---|---|---|---|
| 2000 | Awit Awards | Best Movie/TV/Stage/Theme Song Recording(shared with Wency Cornejo) | "Ngayon Bukas Kahapon"(Warat) | Won |
