= Deep Obsession =

New Zealand music group

- Origin: Auckland, New Zealand
- Genres: Eurodance, pop
- Years active: 1996–present
- Label: Universal Music NZ
- Members: Zara Clark; Charlie Lawson
- Past members: Vanessa Kelly; Christopher Banks

Deep Obsession is a New Zealand group, notable for being the only New Zealand act to have three consecutive No.1 singles in the Official New Zealand Music Chart.

== History ==
Deep Obsession started recording their debut album in 1997. They signed with the newly merged New Zealand branch of Universal Music in 1998 after their first single - a cover of the Air Supply song "Lost in Love" - was released in 1998 and peaked at No. 1 in the New Zealand singles chart.

The group's next two singles, "Cold" and "One & Only", also peaked at No. 1, making them the only New Zealand act to have three consecutive singles reach No.1.

The platinum selling debut album Infinity was released in New Zealand in 1999.

Soon after the second number 1 single "Cold" was released, Christopher Banks stopped working with the group, and began producing a number of different NZ artists with long-time friend, and co-producer Michael Lloyd.

Steve Peach and Adam Goodyear finished the Infinity album in Australia.

When it was released in NZ Infinity sold Platinum in the first few weeks and had achieved three consecutive Number 1 songs, and two other top 50 hits. "You Got The Feeling" followed by "I Surrender".

When the album was re-mixed in London by Brian Rawling (producer for Cher's biggest selling album "Believe"), bass player Steve Lewinson (Simply Red) played on the track "I Surrender" UK version.

As an LA producer who had worked with Pink, Christina Aguilera heard the track before it was officially released and did a US remix (only available on CD single). "I Surrender", written by Z Clark and C Banks, peaked at Number 25 on the Official NZ Music Charts. Both versions were released and charted separately in the NZ Top 50. A music video was never done for "I Surrender".

Deep Obsession continued promoting Infinity and performed with Hanson, S Club 7, Vengaboys and Five.

In 2000 lead vocalist Zara Clark was nominated for "Best Female Vocalist" at the New Zealand Music Awards, and the Number 1 song she had co-written with Chris Banks, "Cold", was also nominated for "Best Song". Vanessa Kelly won "Most Promising Female Vocalist", beating Lavina Williams, who fronted popular kiwi girl group Ma-V-Elle.

In late 2000 Deep Obsession was the first NZ artist to be signed to Universal International.

In 2001 Deep Obsession was nominated for an International Achievement Award at New Zealand Music Awards.

Vanessa Kelly sings the lead vocal for one song from Infinity called "The Power in You". Zara Clark and Vanessa Kelly both sang the backing vocals & harmony vocals for Infinity (see album inlay).

Vanessa Kelly left the group in 2001 to pursue a solo career with the support of Universal NZ.

Zara with Deep Obsession still had a publishing contract with Universal Music Group Australia, and vocalist Charlie Lawson joined the group. Zara and Charlie finished the commitments Deep Obsession had for the Infinity album.

The third incarnation of Deep Obsession recorded the single "Miracles", it made NZ music history again because "Miracles" was the highest-charting song to never be released. "Miracles" climbed the charts to Number 34 from radio airplay alone. "Miracles" was also nominated for "Best Video" at 2003 Tui Music Video Awards.

In 2013 a third version of Infinity was found and the album was available for sale in Japan by Discogs.

Clark, Kelly and Banks reunited for the first time in 2015 for celebrations to mark the 40th anniversary of the New Zealand Music Chart and were honoured for their chart successes.

== Discography ==
=== Albums ===
| Year | Title | Details | Peak chart positions | Certifications |
| Year | Title | Details | NZ | Certifications |
|---|---|---|---|---|
| 1999 | Infinity | Label: Universal Music NZ; Catalogue: 157 126-2 | 8 | RMNZ: Platinum |
| 1999 | Infinity (Remix Album) | UK remix album; Label: Universal Music NZ; Catalogue: 159 110-2 | | |

=== Singles ===
| Year | Title | Peak Chart position | | Album |
| Year | Title | NZ | AUS | Album |
|---|---|---|---|---|
| 1998 | "Lost in Love" | 1 | 200 | Infinity |
| 1999 | "Cold" | 1 | — | Infinity |
| 1999 | "One & Only" | 1 | 146 | Infinity |
| 2000 | "You Got the Feeling" | 17 | | Infinity |
| 2000 | "I Surrender" | 25 | — | Infinity |
| 2003 | "Miracles" | 34 | — | Non-album single |
| 2003 | "I Am" (Deep Obsession featuring Kantuta) | — | — | Non-album single |
"—" denotes a recording that did not chart or was not released in that territory.

== Awards and nominations ==
| Year | Nominee / work | Award | Result |
|---|---|---|---|
| 2000 | Deep Obsession - Infinity | New Zealand Music Awards - Top Group | Nominated |
| 2000 | Zara Clark (Deep Obsession) | New Zealand Music Awards - Top Female Vocalist | Nominated |
| 2000 | Vanessa Kelly (Deep Obsession) | New Zealand Music Awards - Most Promising Female Vocalist | Won |
| 2000 | Christopher Banks and Zara Clark - "Cold" | New Zealand Music Awards - Best Songwriter | Nominated |
| 2000 | Gideon Keith and Seven - Infinity | New Zealand Music Awards - Best Cover | Nominated |
| 2001 | Deep Obsession | New Zealand Music Awards - Outstanding International Achievement | Nominated |
