= One & Only (Deep Obsession song) =

1999 single by Deep Obsession

Single by Deep Obsession

from the album Infinity
- B-side: "E-Motion"
- Released: October 1999
- Studio: Peachy (Sydney, Australia)
- Length: 4:03
- Label: Universal Music
- Songwriters: Christopher Banks; Vanessa Kelly
- Producers: Christopher Banks; Steve Peach

Deep Obsession singles chronology
"Cold" (1999)	"One & Only" (1999)	"You Got the Feeling" (2000)

"One & Only" is a song by New Zealand pop group Deep Obsession, released in October 1999. It's notable for being the third of the group's three consecutive number-one singles in New Zealand. "One & Only" was the first Deep Obsession single released after founding member Christopher Banks had left the group. "One & Only" was certified gold in New Zealand and was ranked the 13th-most-popular single of New Zealand at the end of 1999.

== Music video ==
In 1999, a music video was released for the song, directed by Ian McLean. The video features singers Zara Clark and Vanessa Kelly, placing them in a surreal environment including a large number of fish tanks.

== Track listings ==
CD, maxi-single (New Zealand, 1999)

1. "One & Only" (radio remix) – 3:47
2. "One & Only" (original mix) – 4:03
3. "One & Only" (club edit) – 4:02
4. "One & Only" (extended club mix) – 7:06
5. "E-Motion" – 5:22

CD, maxi-single (Europe, 1999)

1. "One & Only" (radio edit) – 3:31
2. "One & Only" (extended version) – 5:03
3. "One & Only" (original) – 3:47
4. "One & Only" (extended club mix) – 7:06

CD single (United States, 1999)

1. "One & Only" (remix) – 3:29
2. "One & Only" (extended remix) – 5:04
3. "One & Only" (original mix) – 3:47

CD single (Australia, 1999)

1. "One & Only" (radio mix) – 3:50
2. "One & Only" (Brian Rawling radio mix) – 3:31
3. "One & Only" (extended club mix) – 7:06

CD single (United States, 1999)

1. "One & Only" (remix) – 3:29
2. "One & Only" (extended remix) – 5:04

12-inch vinyl (Italy, 2000)

1. "One & Only" (extended version) – 5:03
2. "One & Only" (radio edit) – 3:31
3. "One & Only" (extended club mix) – 7:06
4. "One & Only" (original) – 3:47

CD single (United States, 2000)

1. "One & Only" (radio mix) – 3:31
2. "One & Only" (extended mix) – 5:03

Enhanced CD (Australia, 2000)

1. "One & Only" (radio mix) 3:47
2. "One & Only" (Brian Rawling radio mix) – 3:31
3. "One & Only" (Brian Rawling extended mix) – 5:03
4. "One & Only" (club edit) – 4:02
5. "One & Only" (extended club mix) – 7:06
6. "E-Motion" – 5:22
7. "One & Only" (video)

== Charts ==
=== Weekly charts ===
Chart (1999)	Peak position
New Zealand (Recorded Music NZ)	1
Australia (ARIA)	146

=== Year-end charts ===
Chart (1999)	Position
New Zealand (RIANZ)	13

== Certifications ==
Region	Certification	Certified units/sales
New Zealand (RMNZ)	Gold	5,000^{*}
^{*} Sales figures based on certification alone.

== Release history ==
Region	Date	Format(s)	Label(s)	Ref.
New Zealand	1999	CD	Universal Music	
United States	14 March 2000	Rhythmic contemporary; contemporary hit radio	Farmclub.com; Universal Music	
Japan	17 May 2000	CD	Universal Music Japan	
