= The One That You Love (album) =

1981 studio album by Air Supply

Studio album by Air Supply
- Released: 8 May 1981
- Studios: Paradise Studios (Sydney, Australia)
- Genre: Soft rock
- Length: 39:59
- Label: Arista
- Producer: Harry Maslin

Air Supply chronology
Lost in Love (1980)	The One That You Love (1981)	Now and Forever (1982)

Singles from The One That You Love
- 1. "The One That You Love" Released: 30 April 1981; 2. "Here I Am (Just When I Thought I Was Over You)" Released: 31 August 1981; 3. "Sweet Dreams" Released: December 1981; 4. "Keeping the Love Alive" Released: 1981; 5. "I'll Never Get Enough of You" Released: 1981

Professional ratings
Review scores
Source	Rating
AllMusic	4/5 stars

The One That You Love is the sixth album by British/Australian soft rock band Air Supply, released in 1981. The album became their most famous and successful in their career. It reached No. 10 in Australia and the United States.

== Overview ==
The album was released after their major success with their previous album, Lost in Love, and multiplied the band's popularity through the first period of the 1980s. Production was carried out by Harry Maslin, while the project featured Clive Davis as executive producer. The single, "The One That You Love", became the band's first and only No. 1 hit in the US. "Here I Am (Just When I Thought I Was Over You)" reached No. 5 on the US chart, being closely related to the style of Barry Manilow, one of the band's influences. The third single of the album was "Sweet Dreams", followed by "Keeping the Love Alive". The track "I'll Never Get Enough of You" was used as the main theme of a Japanese TV novel and was released as a single, becoming a hit there. This was their first entry into any Asian chart.

== Reception ==
Cash Box said "The group had a wildly successful year in 1980. The One That You Love follows in the same vein as last year's debut with those lifting ballads and helium vocal. Best cuts on this collection of classic adult contemporary fare are 'Keeping the Love Alive' and 'I Want to Give It All'."

== Track listing ==
All songs written by Graham Russell, except where noted.

The One That You Love track listing
No.	Title	Writer(s)	Length
1.	"Don't Turn Me Away"		3:39
2.	"Here I Am (Just When I Thought I Was Over You)"	Norman Saleet	3:46
3.	"Keeping the Love Alive"	Richard Supa	3:32
4.	"The One That You Love"		4:17
5.	"This Heart Belongs to Me"		4:11
6.	"Sweet Dreams"		5:19
7.	"I Want to Give It All"	Russell, Rex Goh	3:37
8.	"I'll Never Get Enough of You"	Jeanne Napoli, Gary Portnoy, Judy Quay	3:42
9.	"Tonite"		3:49
10.	"I've Got Your Love"		3:39
Total length:			39:59

== Personnel ==
Air Supply

- Russell Hitchcock – vocals
- Graham Russell – vocals, acoustic guitar
- Frank Esler-Smith – keyboards, orchestral arrangements and conductor
- Rex Goh – acoustic guitar, electric guitar
- David Moyse – acoustic guitar, electric guitar
- David Green – bass
- Ralph Cooper – drums

=== Production ===
- Clive Davis – executive producer
- Harry Maslin – producer, engineer, mixing
- Neil Rawle – assistant engineer
- Jon Van Nest – mix assistant
- Chris Bellman – mastering
- Allen Zentz Recording (Hollywood, California) – mixing and mastering location
- Howard Fritzon – art direction
- Ria Lewerke-Shapiro – art direction
- Leon Lecash – photography
- Guy Maxwell – photography
- Ray Barber – logo design

== Charts ==
=== Weekly charts ===
Weekly chart performance for The One That You Love
Chart (1981)	Peak position
Australian Albums (Kent Music Report)	10
Canada Top Albums/CDs (RPM)	21
US Billboard 200	10

=== Year-end charts ===
Year-end chart performance for The One That You Love
Chart (1981)	Position
US Billboard 200	66
Chart (1982)	Position
US Billboard 200	44

== Certifications and sales ==
Certifications and sales for The One That You Love
Region	Certification	Certified units/sales
Australia (ARIA)	Platinum	50,000^{^}
Canada (Music Canada)	2× Platinum	200,000^{^}
Hong Kong (IFPI Hong Kong)	Gold	10,000^{*}
United States (RIAA)	Platinum	1,000,000^{^}
^{*} Sales figures based on certification alone.^{^} Shipments figures based on certification alone.
