= Encore (Bobby Vinton album) =

1980 album by Bobby Vinton

Studio album by Bobby Vinton
- Released: January 1980
- Studio: Devonshire Studios
- Genre: Pop
- Length: 34:09
- Label: Tapestry
- Producer: Bobby Vinton

Bobby Vinton chronology
The Million Selling Records of Bobby Vinton (1979)	Encore (1980)	My Song (1980)

Encore was Bobby Vinton's thirtieth studio album, released in 1980. "Make Believe It's Your First Time" and "Let Me Love You Goodbye" are two singles from the album. Covers include "He" and "To All the Girls I've Loved Before".

== Track listing ==
Side 1

No.	Title	Composers	Length
1.	"He" (cover)	Jack Richards, Richard Mullan	3:10
2.	"Papa Look I'm in Love"	Barry Manilow, Bruce Sussman	3:15
3.	"I-Ove-Lay-Ou-Yay"	Kevin Penderson, Jack Sawyer, Mark Staples	3:24
4.	"Flame"	Steve Sperry	4:18
5.	"Let Me Love You Goodbye"	Steve Davis, Billy Sherrill	3:01

Side 2

No.	Title	Composers	Length
1.	"You Put It All Together"	Gloria Sklerov, Sam Kunin	3:45
2.	"To All the Girls I've Loved Before" (cover)	Albert Hammond, Hal David	3:24
3.	"My First and Only Love"	Bobby Vinton, Phil Coulter	2:38
4.	"Make Believe It's Your First Time"	Bob Morrison, John Wilson	3:27
5.	"This Time I Know It's Real"	Norman Saleit	3:47

== Personnel ==
- Bobby Vinton - primary artist, producer
- Ron Malo - recording engineer
- Carol Jolin - female vocals

== Charts ==
Year	Song	Chart	Position	Ref
1980	"Make Believe It's Your First Time"	Billboard Hot Country Singles	#86	
1980	"Make Believe It's Your First Time"	Billboard Hot Adult Contemporary Tracks	#17	
1980	"Make Believe It's Your First Time"	Billboard Hot 100	#78	
1981	"Let Me Love You Goodbye"	Billboard Hot Adult Contemporary Tracks	#45	
