= Norman Saleet =

American songwriter, musician, and actor

- Born: Norman Sallitt
- Origin: Butler, Pennsylvania, U.S.
- Genres: Adult contemporary
- Occupations: Singer, songwriter, musician, actor
- Instruments: Guitar, vocals
- Label: RCA Records
- Formerly of: Good Family

Norman Saleet (born Norman Sallitt) is an American singer, songwriter, musician, and actor. He is best known for writing Air Supply's 1981 hit "Here I Am". The song was chosen for the band by record producer Clive Davis.

Saleet is from Butler, Pennsylvania.

Saleet began playing the guitar at the age of 15 and founded a band, the Good Family, at 18. The band enjoyed some local popularity in Western Pennsylvania.

== Discography ==
Saleet has recorded one album, Here I Am, for RCA Records. The album was described by Billboard as being adult contemporary, similar in style to Saleet's "Here I Am" hit written for the band Air Supply. The album features mostly ballads, while "Magic in the Air" and "Lines" are more energetic and were Billboard's picks from the album. The two songs were also released as singles, in addition to "Hang On In". "Magic in the Air" earned Saleet the American Song Festival award in the professional Top 40 category.

The album features the following songs:

All tracks are written by Norman Saleet.

Here I Am
No.	Title	Length
1.	"Let's Stop Before We Fall in Love"
2.	"Magic in the Air"
3.	"Falling in Love with You Tonight"
4.	"High Cost of Lovin'"
5.	"Cover Girl"
6.	"Here I Am"
7.	"Lines"
8.	"This Time I Know It's Real"
9.	"Come Back Baby"
10.	"Hang On In"

== Songs ==
Year	Title	Album	Recording artist	Notes	Ref.
1980	"This Time I Know It's Real"	Encore / Bobby Vinton	Bobby Vinton		
1980	"Lady, Sweet Lady"	Sheet Music	Barry White		
1980	"Take It Like a Woman"	Love Has No Reason	Debby Boone		
1981	"Hang On In"	Scissors Cut	Art Garfunkel		
1981	"Here I Am"	The One That You Love	Air Supply		
1982	"Somethin's Goin' On"	Friends in Love	Johnny Mathis		
1983	"On Our Way to Love"	Cage the Songbird	Crystal Gayle		
1985	"It Can't Be Done"	It Can't Be Done	Tim Blixseth with Kathy Walker	written with Tim Blixseth	
1996	"Dónde Estás?"	Perdoname	Los Agues	written with A.B. Quintanilla III	
1997	"Where Did the Feeling Go?"	Selena: The Original Motion Picture Soundtrack	Jill Michaels/Russell Hitchcock/Selena		

== Filmography ==
Year	Title	Role	Ref.
1995	Undercover	Dr. Freerman	
1996	Loser	Nicky Ray	
2009	Paranormal Entity	Edgar Lauren	
