= All Out of Love =

1980 single by Air Supply

Single by Air Supply

from the album Lost in Love
- B-side: "Old Habits Die Hard"
- Released: 7 February 1980
- Recorded: 1979
- Genre: Soft rock
- Length: 4:04 (album version); 3:53 (single version)
- Label: Arista
- Songwriters: Clive Davis, Graham Russell
- Producer: Robie Porter

Air Supply singles chronology
"Lost in Love" (1979)	"All Out of Love" (1980)	"Every Woman in the World" (1980)

Music video
- "All Out of Love" on YouTube

Audio sample
- file; help

"All Out of Love" is a song by British/Australian soft rock duo Air Supply, released as a single in 1980 from their fifth studio album Lost in Love. The song was written by Graham Russell and Clive Davis.

The song's lyrics describe the emotional state of a man desperately trying to win back the love of his life after the couple's separation caused by a wrong done by the man against the woman he's in love with. In the United States, it reached number two on the Billboard Hot 100 (blocked from the top spot by both "Upside Down" by Diana Ross and "Another One Bites the Dust" by Queen) and number five on the Adult Contemporary chart. In the UK, the song reached number 11 on the UK singles chart and is their only top 40 hit in that country. It placed 92nd in VH1's list of the "100 Greatest Love Songs" in 2003.

== History ==
The chorus was originally "I'm all out of love, I want to arrest you", but Clive Davis thought that would be confusing to American audiences, so he suggested "I'm all out of love, I'm so lost without you", which led to him being given a songwriting credit.

The song is known for vocalist Russell Hitchcock holding the final note for 16.2 seconds. This was the longest-held note for a male pop singer until 1983, when Sheriff lead vocalist Freddy Curci held the final note of "When I'm with You" for 19.4 seconds.

== Reception ==
Cash Box said that "a dynamite chorus and swelling crescendo insure hit status." Record World called it a "formula-perfect follow-up" to "Lost in Love."

== Personnel ==
- Russell Hitchcock - second lead vocals
- Graham Russell - first lead vocals and backing vocals, guitar
- Marcy Levy - bridge backing vocals
- Air Supply, Robie Porter, and Frank Esler-Smith - arrangement

== Track listing ==
Air Supply version:

1. "All Out of Love" – 4.01
2. "Here I Am" – 3.48
3. "Every Woman in the World" – 3.32

== Charts ==
=== Weekly charts ===
Chart (1980–81)	Peak position
Argentina	1
Australia (Kent Music Report)	9
Canada RPM Top Singles	2
France	3
Iceland (Vísir)	4
Ireland (IRMA)	10
Netherlands (Single Top 100)	31
New Zealand (Recorded Music NZ)	21
South Africa (Springbok Radio)	11
UK Singles (Official Charts)	11
US Billboard Hot 100	2
US Adult Contemporary (Billboard)	5
US Cash Box Top 100	2
US Record World	1
Zimbabwe (ZIMA)	1

=== Year-end charts ===
Chart (1980)	Rank
Australia (Kent Music Report)	54
US Billboard Hot 100	55
US Cash Box	27

== Certifications ==
Region	Certification	Certified units/sales
Canada (Music Canada)	Gold	75,000^{^}
New Zealand (RMNZ)	Platinum	30,000^{‡}
United Kingdom (BPI)	Gold	400,000^{‡}
United States (RIAA)	2× Platinum	2,000,000^{‡}
^{^} Shipments figures based on certification alone.^{‡} Sales+streaming figures based on certification alone.

== Andru Donalds version ==
"All Out of Love"

Single by Andru Donalds

from the album Snowin' Under My Skin
- Released: 22 March 1999
- Length: 4:00
- Label: Virgin
- Songwriters: Clive Davis, Graham Russell
- Producer: Michael Cretu

Andru Donalds singles chronology
"(Still) Lovin' You" (1999)	"All Out of Love" (1999)	"Simple Obsession" (1999)

In 1999, Andru Donalds recorded a cover version of the song that was successful in German-speaking Europe, peaking at number three in Austria, Germany, and Switzerland. It is from the album Snowin' Under My Skin, and also appears on the compilation album Chart Hits 6 – 1999.

=== Music video ===
The music video is set in a desert. In the first half of the song, Donalds sings the song blindfolded to deserters also blindfolded. In between, shades are also displayed and a bowl is filled with water. From the second half, he sings without a blindfold and draws the attention of a resident to the end.

=== Track listing ===
CD-maxi

1. "All Out of Love" (radio edit) – 4:00
2. "All Out of Love" (dance radio mix) – 3:59
3. "All Out of Love" (Slow Ambient mix) – 4:18
4. "All Out of Love" (Ambient club mix) – 6:23

=== Charts ===
==== Weekly charts ====
Chart (1999)	Peak position
Austria (Ö3 Austria Top 40)	3
Europe (Eurochart Hot 100)	11
Germany (GfK)	3
Switzerland (Schweizer Hitparade)	3

==== Year-end charts ====
Chart (1999)	Position
Austria (Ö3 Austria Top 40)	28
Europe (Eurochart Hot 100)	96
Germany (Media Control)	22
Switzerland (Schweizer Hitparade)	29

=== Certifications ===
Region	Certification	Certified units/sales
Austria (IFPI Austria)	Gold	25,000^{*}
Germany (BVMI)	Gold	250,000^{^}
^{*} Sales figures based on certification alone.^{^} Shipments figures based on certification alone.

== Other versions ==
- In 1997, Irish boy band OTT released their version of the song which peaked at No. 3 in Ireland and No. 11 on the UK Singles Chart, the same peak position as the original.
- In 2003, Dutch trance act Foundation featuring singer Natalie Rossi scored a top 40 hit on the UK Singles Chart with their version. It also reached No. 20 on the UK Dance Singles Chart.
- In 2006, Westlife recorded the song as a duet with Delta Goodrem for their album, The Love Album. It charted at No. 31 on the Swedish singles chart in 2007.
- In 2021, actor and singer Iñigo Pascual released his version of the song under Tarsier Records, which received praise from Air Supply.
