= Ma-V-Elle =

New Zealand girl group

- Origin: Auckland, New Zealand
- Genres: Pop, R&B
- Years active: 1996–2000, 2013–present
- Label: Birthday Records/Festival Records
- Members: Lavina Williams; Marina Davis; Maybelle Galuvao
- Website: facebook.com/marinalavinamaybelle

Ma-V-Elle is a three-piece New Zealand girl group best known for their top-40 singles in the New Zealand charts in the mid 1990s. The group consists of Lavina Williams, Marina Davis and Maybelle Galuvao.

== Background ==
The group formed at James Cook High School, Manurewa in the mid 1990s. Ma-V-Elle's name comes from the first names of the three members - Marina, Lavina and Maybelle. The group was originally managed by Tim Mahon.

Their debut album Spoken To was released in 1997, with the trio touring nationally and internationally, including two performances at Ronnie Scott's Jazz Club in London.

Member Marina Davis left in 1998 for religious reasons, with Maybelle and Lavina continuing as a duo. The group released their second album, Angel in 1999, with a heavier, drum and bass-inspired sound.

Both Maybelle Galuvao and Lavina Williams were nominated for the Most Promising Female Vocalist award at the 2000 New Zealand Music Awards, losing to Vanessa Kelly of Deep Obsession.

In 2000 the duo recorded a version of "I Only Want to Be with You" that was used as the station identification jingle for TV2. Ma-V-Elle eventually split later in 2000, with members focusing on their solo careers and families.

Ma-V-Elle performed together for the first time in 13 years with a surprise reunion at the 2013 Pacific Music Awards. The group released new single "Let's Go (To the Sky)" and performed at the Parachute music festival in January 2014.

== Members ==
Maybelle Galuvao is married to former professional rugby league footballer Joe Galuvao. In 2014, Maybelle entered as a third contestant on The Voice where she joined Kylie Minogue's team after the live auditions.

Lavina Williams is the older sister of singers Emily Williams and J. Williams. In 2006 Lavina was in the top 12 of Australian Idol. She finished in eighth place. From 2004 to 2006 she played the role of Shenzi in the Australian run of The Lion King musical. She later reprised the role in a 2011 Singapore season of the show.

Marina Davis made it to the Home Visits round of The X Factor Australia in 2011 as part of the Over-25s group before she was eliminated.

== Discography ==
=== Albums ===
- Spoken To (1997)
- Angel (1999)

=== Singles ===
Year	Title	Peak chart positions	Album
Year	Title	NZ	Album
1997	"Show Me Heaven"	36	Spoken To
1997	"Three Flow"	43	Spoken To
1997	"Depend On Me"	—	Spoken To
1998	"Freedom"	29	Spoken To
1998	"Love Is"	—	Spoken To
1998	"Angel"	—	Angel
1999	"Never Say Goodbye"	26	Angel
1999	"Don't Be So Shy"	—	Angel
2013	"Let's Go (To the Sky)"	—	Non-album single
"—" denotes a recording that did not chart or was not released in that territory.
