= Young Love (Air Supply song) =

1982 single by Air Supply

Single by Air Supply

from the album Now and Forever
- B-side: "She Never Heard You Call"
- Released: 1982
- Recorded: 1982
- Genre: Soft rock
- Length: 3:46
- Label: Arista
- Songwriter: Graham Russell
- Producer: Harry Maslin

Air Supply singles chronology
"Even the Nights Are Better" (1982)	"Young Love" (1982)	"Two Less Lonely People in the World" (1982)

"Young Love" is a song by English/Australian soft rock band Air Supply from their seventh album, Now and Forever. The song reached the top 40 on the Billboard Hot 100, where it peaked at No. 38. On the Adult Contemporary chart, the song reached a peak of No. 13. On the Canadian Adult Contemporary chart, the song reached No. 3.

Billboard said that the song "caters to [Air Supply's] younger listeners" and commented on the hook and the song's "wistful lyricism."

== Charts ==
=== Weekly charts ===
Chart (1982)	Peak position
Canada RPM Adult Contemporary	3
US Billboard Hot 100	38
US Adult Contemporary (Billboard)	13

== Track listing ==
U.S. 7-inch single
A. "Young Love" - 3:46
B. "She Never Heard You Call" - 3:24
