= Cold (Deep Obsession song) =

1999 single by Deep Obsession

Single by Deep Obsession

from the album Infinity
- B-side: "Would You?"
- Released: 1999
- Length: 3:17
- Label: Universal
- Songwriters: Christopher Banks; Zara Clark
- Producers: Christopher Banks; Paul Goodyear

Deep Obsession singles chronology
"Lost in Love" (1998)	"Cold" (1999)	"One & Only" (1999)

Audio
- "Cold" on YouTube

"Cold" is a song by New Zealand pop music group Deep Obsession. It was written by two of the band's three members—Christopher Banks and Zara Clark—and produced by Banks and Australian disc jockey Paul Goodyear. The song was released as the group's second single from their debut studio album, Infinity (1999), almost a year after their previous single, a cover of "Lost in Love" by British-Australian soft rock duo Air Supply.

Backed with the album track "Would You?" and several remixes as B-sides, "Cold" became the group's second number-one single in New Zealand, topping the RIANZ Singles Chart on the week of 11 July 1999. Banks and Clark received an NZ Music Award nomination in 2000 for writing "Cold". Two music videos were made for the song, both directed by Rongotai Lomas.

== Release and success ==
"Cold" was included on Infinity as the album's third track. Upon its release as a single, "Cold" debuted at number five on New Zealand's RIANZ Singles Chart on 4 July 1999. The following week, it rose to number one, giving Deep Obsession their second number-one hit in their home country, following their cover of Air Supply's "Lost in Love". After peaking, the song lost the number-one spot on 18 July 1999 to Britney Spears' "Sometimes", dropping to number two. "Cold" spent four more weeks in the top 10 and five further weeks in the top 50, appearing on the ranking for a total of 11 weeks. In 2000, Banks and Clark were nominated as Best Songwriters at the NZ Music Awards for penning "Cold", losing to the writer of Stellar*'s song "Violent", Boh Runga.

== Music videos ==
"Cold" was accompanied by two music videos, both directed Rongotai Lomas. The first video, filmed by cameraperson David Jack, features scenes of the band performing the song live interspersed with clips of vocalists Clark and Vanessa Kelly singing the song. During these scenes, which are coloured by a coldly lit filter, both women are wearing light blue eye shadow. Banks is occasionally seen through this filter.

The second video features more references to cold weather, including snow, furry clothes, and blue colouration. One scene features Clark or Kelly hanging upside-down in a Gladwrap chrysalis. Toward the end of the video, the three band members huddle together, with the final shot featuring them together singing the line "please hold me close". New Zealand music video website 5000 Ways wrote about this video, highlighting the chrysalis scene but criticising the overdone makeup and special effects.

== Track listings ==
"Cold" was written by Banks and Clark and produced by Banks and Goodyear, who remixed tracks two to four. Track five was produced by Steve Peach.

New Zealand maxi-CD single

1. "Cold" (radio version)
2. "Cold" (Pointy club edit)
3. "Cold" (Pointy club mix)
4. "Cold" (Pointy dub)
5. "Would You?"

== Charts ==
Chart (1999)	Peak position
New Zealand (Recorded Music NZ)	1
