= Even the Nights Are Better =

1982 single by Air Supply

Single by Air Supply

from the album Now and Forever
- B-side: "One Step Closer"
- Released: June 1982
- Recorded: 1981
- Genre: Soft rock
- Length: 4:01
- Label: Arista
- Songwriter: J. L. Wallace · Kenneth Bell · Terry Skinner
- Producer: Harry Maslin

Air Supply singles chronology
"I'll Never Get Enough of You" (1981)	"Even the Nights Are Better" (1982)	"Young Love" (1982)

Music video
- "Even the Nights Are Better" on YouTube

"Even the Nights Are Better" is a 1982 ballad performed by the English-Australian soft rock band Air Supply, released on their seventh studio album Now and Forever (1982) as the album's lead single. It first charted in the United States on the Billboard Adult Contemporary chart, where it spent four weeks at No. 1 in July and August. This was Air Supply's third song to reach the summit on this chart. It also reached No. 1 on the Canadian AC chart.

In September 1982, the song reached its peak position of No. 5 on the Billboard Hot 100, becoming the group's seventh consecutive top five hit on the US pop chart. However the song is in the record books for how quickly it fell off the top 40. The song slipped to six. Then on the issue dated 25 September 1982, the song fell to 42. It held the record for highest drop from the top 40 for thirty years.

In the United Kingdom, where the group did not enjoy the same amount of success as they did in Australia and the US, the song missed the top 40 by four places, reaching No. 44 on the UK Singles Chart. It is their second highest-charting single in the UK, after their No. 11 hit with "All Out of Love" in 1980.

== Background ==
This song is written from the perspective of a man who had lost a significant other at the song's beginning, before the rest of the song's lyrics tell a much happier story from the singer's perspective of life with someone new, who had the same feelings of loneliness as the lyricist.

== Reception ==
Billboard said that "The deliberate solo vocal, delicate piano and string section interplay and chorus/bridge harmonies are direct links to [Air Supply's] past hits."

== Music video ==
The video for "Even the Nights Are Better" was filmed on Coney Island Beach, the Riegelmann Boardwalk and in Astroland, in Coney Island, Brooklyn, New York.

== Credits and personnel ==
=== Personnel ===
- Russell Hitchcock – lead vocals
- Graham Russell – vocals, rhythm guitars
- Frank Esler-Smith – keyboards, orchestra arrangements and conductor
- David Moyse – lead guitars
- Rex Goh – lead guitars
- David Green – bass
- Ralph Cooper – drums

== Chart performance ==
=== Weekly charts ===
Chart (1982)	Peak position
Australia (Kent Music Report)	35
Canada RPM Adult Contemporary	1
Canada RPM Top Singles	7
Ireland (IRMA)	9
New Zealand (Recorded Music NZ)	37
UK Singles (Official Charts)	44
US Billboard Hot 100	5
US Billboard Adult Contemporary	1
US Cashbox Top 100	8

=== Year-end charts ===
Chart (1982)	Rank
Canada	62
US Billboard Hot 100	37
US Cash Box	55

== Certifications ==
Region	Certification	Certified units/sales
United States (RIAA)	Gold	500,000^{‡}
^{‡} Sales+streaming figures based on certification alone.

== See also ==
- List of Billboard Adult Contemporary number ones of 1982
