= 2019 Cinemalaya =

15th Cinemalaya Independent Film Festival
- Official festival poster
- Opening film: Ang Hupa by Lav Diaz
- Closing film: Mina-Anud by Kerwin Go
- Location: Metro Manila, Philippines
- Film titles: 20
- Festival date: August 2, 2019–August 13, 2019
- Language: English, Filipino, Ilonggo, Bicolano
- Website: Official Website

Cinemalaya chronology
- 2020 2018

The 15th Cinemalaya Independent Film Festival was held August 2–13, 2019, in Metro Manila, Philippines. A total of ten full-length features and ten short films competed. The festival was opened by the film Ang Hupa by Lav Diaz and its closing film was Mina-Anud by Kerwin Go.

== Entries ==
The winning film is highlighted with boldface and a dagger.

=== Full-Length Features ===
Title	Director	Cast	Genre
Ani (The Harvest)	Kim Zuniga and Sandro Del Rosario	Zyren de la Cruz, Ricky Davao, Miguel Valdes, Marc Felix, Anna Luna, and JM Canlas	Family drama, Fantasy
Belle Douleur (A Beautiful Pain)	Atty. Joji V. Alonso	Mylene Dizon, Kit Thompson, Marlon Rivera, Jenny Jamora, and Hannah Ledesma	Romance Drama
Children of the River	Maricel Cariaga	Noel Comia Jr., Ricky Oriarte, Dave Justin Francis, Junyka Santarin, JR Custodio, and Juancho Triviño	Social drama
Edward	Thop Nazareno	Louise Abuel, Dido dela Paz, Elijah Canlas, Manuel Chua, and Ella Cruz	Social drama, Comedy
Fuccbois	Eduardo Roy, Jr.	Royce Cabrera, Kokoy de Santos, and Ricky Davao	Social drama, Thriller
Iska	Theodore Boborol	Ruby Ruiz, Soliman Cruz, Ricky Rivero, Jonic Magno, Jomari Angeles, and RK Bagatsing	Social drama
**John Denver Trending** ^{†}	Arden Rod Condez	Jansen Magpusao, Meryll Soriano, Glenn Mas, Sammy Rubido, Vince Philip Alegre, and Jofranz Ambubuyog	Social drama
Malamaya (The Color of Ash)	Danica Sta. Lucia and Leilani Chavez	Sunshine Cruz, Enzo Pineda, Raymond Bagatsing, and Bernadette Allyson	Romance drama
Pandanggo sa Hukay	Sheryl Rose Andes	Iza Calzado, Ybes Bagadiong, Acey Aguilar, Diva Montelaba, Charlie Dizon, and Star Orjaliza	Social drama, Thriller
Tabon	Alexander Xian Cruz Lim Uy (credited as Xian Lim)	Christopher Roxas, Ynna Asistio, Dexter Doria, Bapbap Reyes, Menggie Cobarrubias, Leon Miguel, Benjie Felipe, Lao Rodriguez, and Richard Manabat	Social drama, Thriller

=== Short films ===
Title	Director
**'Wag Mo 'Kong Kausapin (Please Stop Talking)** ^{†}	Josef Gacutan
Disconnection Notice	Glenn Lowell Averia
Gatilyo	Harold Lance Pialda
Heist School	Julius Renomeron Jr.
Hele ng maharlika (Lullaby of the free)	Norvin De Los Santos
Kontrolado ni Girly ang Buhay N'ya	Gilb Baldoza
Sa among agway (In between Spaces)	Don Senoc
Sa gabing tanging liwanag ay paniniwala (Belief as the light in darkness)	Francis Amir Guillermo
The Shoemaker	Sheron Dayoc
Tembong (Connecting)	Shaira Advincula

== Awards ==
The awards ceremony was held on August 12, 2019, at the Tanghalang Nicanor Abelardo (CCP Main Theater), Cultural Center of the Philippines.

=== Full-Length Features ===
- Best Film – John Denver Trending by Arden Rod Condez
  - Special Jury Prize – Edward by Thop Nazareno
  - Audience Choice Award – Belle Douleur (A Beautiful Pain) by Atty. Joji V. Alonso
- Best Direction – Eduardo Roy Jr. for Fuccbois
- Best Actor – Jansen Magpusao for John Denver Trending
- Best Actress – Ruby Ruiz for Iska
- Best Supporting Actor – Ricky Davao for Fuccbois
- Best Supporting Actress – Ella Cruz for Edward
- Best Screenplay – Mary Rose Colindres for Iska
- Best Cinematography – Rommel Sales for John Denver Trending
- Best Editing – Benjo Ferrer III for John Denver Trending
- Best Sound – Immanuel Verona for Iska
- Best Original Music Score – Len Calvo for John Denver Trending
- Best Production Design – Alvin Francisco for Edward
- NETPAC Award – John Denver Trending by Arden Rod Condez

=== Short films ===
- Best Short Film: "'Wag Mo 'Kong Kausapin (Please Stop Talking)" by Josef Gacutan
  - NETPAC Award: "Disconnection Notice" by Glenn Averia
  - NETPAC Award Special Mention: "Sa Among Agwat" by Don Senoc
  - Special Jury Award: "Tembong" by Shaira Advincula
  - Special Mention for Subject Matter: "Hele ng Maharlika" by Norvin delos Santos
  - Audience Choice: "Heist School" by Julius Renomeron Jr.
- Best Screenplay: "Kontrolado ni Girly and Buhay N'ya" by Gilb Baldoza
- Best Director: "Sa Among Agwat" director Don Senoc
