= John Denver Trending =

- Official movie poster
- Directed by: Arden Rod Condez
- Written by: Arden Rod Condez
- Produced by: Sonny Calvento; Sheron Dayoc; Bridget Ng-Ting; Kelvin Ting
- Starring: Jansen Magpusao; Meryll Soriano
- Cinematography: Rommel Sales
- Edited by: Benjo Ferrer III
- Music by: Len Calvo
- Production companies: Cinemalaya Foundation; What If Films Philippines; Southern Lantern Pictures; Outpost Visual Frontier; Tinker Bulb Productions
- Distributed by: Cinemalaya Foundation iWant TFC
- Release dates: August 2, 2019 (Busan); April 25, 2020
- Running time: 95 minutes
- Country: Philippines
- Languages: Kinaray-a; Hiligaynon; Filipino
- Budget: ₱1 million

John Denver Trending is a 2019 Filipino independent drama film written and directed by Arden Rod Condez. Starring Jansen Magpusao and Meryll Soriano, the story follows a teenage boy whose life took a downturn when he became viral for a video depicting him brutally attacking his classmate. The film, whose screenplay won the Carlos Palanca Memorial Awards for Screenplay in Filipino, was produced on a limited budget and shot entirely in Pandan, Antique.

A co-production of Cinemalaya Foundation, What If Films Philippines, Southern Lantern Pictures, Outpost Visual Frontier, and Tinker Bulb Productions, the film was released theatrically on August 2, 2019, as one of the full-length entries at the 15th Cinemalaya Independent Film Festival.

== Plot ==
In Pandan, Antique, 14-year-old student John Denver Cabungcal studies in Sta. Ines Catholic High School. On February 18, after practicing a dance for Director's Day, he goes to a classroom to take his bag and leave. A peer named Carlos Samulde immediately accuses him of stealing Makoy's iPad, which was supposedly in the classroom. When John denies it, a fight ensues, and another peer records John beating Carlos, posted on Facebook without context. Having overheard the plan, John learns that the post has gone viral, with unanimous condemnation against him and his father, who works abroad, expressing disappointment.

The next day, Makoy's mother takes this to the school principal's and police's notice. John continues pleading innocence, but Carlos argues the rest otherwise in convincing fashion, claiming that this stems from Makoy's bullying towards John. When John's mother is made aware of this, his bad discipline record is noted. She nevertheless sides with her son, saying that when he lies, his nose swells. The school announces an investigation team, and more hate is being directed towards John, culminating in several students beating him up.

Amid increased bullying and national media coverage, John's depression deepens. The local mayor speculates that he is a troubled teen. The next day, John learns that an interview implying he was seen selling the iPad to help his mother has circulated online. An unidentified source spliced the original footage, a harmless interview showing John helping his mother sell bags. He is brought to the police station, where he tearfully pleads innocence, prompting the policeman to scold him, claiming all evidence points to him as the culprit. John escapes from the police station, flees to his house, and commits suicide by hanging. Meanwhile, his mother searches for him at school and, after a teacher reassures her that he likely went home, she walks home alone.

== Cast ==
Main cast

- Jansen Magpusao as John Denver Cabungcal: The titular character who was wrongfully blamed for attacking his classmate.
- Meryll Soriano as Marites Cabungcal: The titular character's mother.

Supporting cast

- Glenn Sevilla Mas as Mando
- Sunshine Teodoro as Evelina Pascual
- Vince Philip Alegre as Makoy Pascual
- Sammy Rubido as Senior Police Officer Corpus
- Luz Venus as School Principal
- Jofranz Ambubuyog
- Christian Alarcon
- Zandro Leo Canlog
- Andy Yuarata
- Ricky Perez
- Elmer Yuarata as Municipal Mayor
- Estela Patino as Dolores (Suspected Witch)
- Renato Sagot as Tay Bining (Spiritual Healer)
- Bert Briones as School Teacher
- Shan Estoya as School Teacher
- Enrique Sanchez
- Eldin Labris
- Joerlyn Samulde
- Akia Buenaflor
- Jinalyn Tandoy

== Release ==
The film competed at the 24th Busan International Film Festival alongside other films from Kyrgyzstan, China, Iran, Taiwan, India, Vietnam, South Korea, and Japan, and is part of the BIFF's New Currents section held from October 3 to 12 October 2019 at the Busan Cinema Center. The film was also screened on March 19, 2021 at Filmgarde Cineplexes Bugis as a part of a series of films shown during the Happiness Film Festival Singapore.

As of November 2022, the Film Development Council of the Philippines (FDCP) has announced that the film is the first Filipino film to receive a nationwide theatrical release in South Korea.

== Reception ==
=== Critical response ===
The film received widespread critical acclaim in the Philippines. Fred Hawson of ABS-CBN News described it as “a very powerful and timely statement against bullying—physically and verbally in person, or virtually online.” He highlighted its exploration of social media’s dangerous influence on public opinion through biased or fake news, and praised director Arden Rod Condez for his focused, serious approach. Hawson noted that, despite some foreshadowing, the film’s ending remains profoundly impactful.

Oggs Cruz of Rappler praised John Denver Trending for its timely and direct messaging, writing that the film is “not just pertinent, but also important” in highlighting the dangers of virtual connections in today’s social media-driven world.

Similarly, Wanggo Gallaga of ClickTheCity gave a favorable review, noting that the film “captures a very real situation in today’s world of online witch hunts and slander.” He highlighted the film’s use of an actual witch hunt to draw parallels between historical and contemporary forms of mob mentality, describing it as “painful,” “sobering,” and “a powerful film” that combines strong performances and craftsmanship to create a moving and relevant work.

In a review for CNN Philippines, Gil Perez and Don Jaucian praised the film’s restraint, writing that John Denver Trending is “not preachy at all” despite tackling themes like fake news, online toxicity, and cyberbullying. They noted that director Arden Rod Condez avoids heavy-handed commentary, instead presenting events in an organic, realistic sequence. This understated approach, they argued, makes the film more powerful, compelling audiences to confront their own complicity and culpability.

Stephanie Mayo of the Daily Tribune described John Denver Trending as "mandatory viewing," calling it "a provocative film, sharpened by Rommel Sales’ exquisite cinematography." She emphasized the film’s moral resonance, noting its reminder to be mindful of one's words and its encouragement of open communication between parents and children. "A child should never hesitate to open up or approach a parent," she wrote, adding that parents must not be too busy to check in on their children. She concluded by highlighting the film's message about the importance of teaching children hope and resilience in a "cruel, cruel world."

J. Neil Garcia of GMA News praised the film's portrayal of its setting, writing, "A clear strength of the film is its rural and ‘regional’ world, with its culturally simultaneous reality being succinctly captured in the depiction of communal faith healers paradoxically coexisting with smartphones, thereby suggesting not so much rupture as continuity between the regime of memory and the regime of data, especially where the residual but entirely determinative power of orality is concerned."

Kean Planas of MyReelThoughts.com gave the film a perfect 10 out of 10, describing it as "a powerful film with an extremely important message to tell," adding, "Words cannot even explain how deeply affected I am by it. The ending gave me goosebumps like no other film in this year’s line-up has given me. Go see it, it will change your perspective on life and the world we currently live in after. It’s one of Cinemalaya’s best, one of this year’s best films, even."

Blogger Nazamel Tabares of PelikulaMania.com gave the film a perfect rating, praising its focused storytelling and effective message delivery, stating, "It's amazing how focused his storytelling is... and I applaud him [Cruz] for that."

=== Accolades ===
Accolades received by John Denver Trending
Award	Date of ceremony	Category	Recipient(s)	Result	Ref.
24th Busan International Film Festival	2019	Best Film - New Currents	John Denver Trending	Nominated	
Cinemalaya Independent Film Festival	2019	Best Film	John Denver Trending	Won	
Cinemalaya Independent Film Festival	2019	NETPAC Award for Full-Length Category	John Denver Trending	Won	
Cinemalaya Independent Film Festival	2019	Best Actor	Jansen Magpusao	Won	
Cinemalaya Independent Film Festival	2019	Best Editing	Benjo Ferrer III	Won	
Cinemalaya Independent Film Festival	2019	Best Cinematography	Rommel Sales	Won	
Cinemalaya Independent Film Festival	2019	Best Original Musical Score	Len Calvo	Won	
CinemAsia Film Festival	2020	Best Film	Arden Rod Cruz	Nominated	
FAMAS Awards	2020	Best Picture	John Denver Trending	Nominated	
FAMAS Awards	2020	Best Director	Arden Rod Condez	Nominated	
FAMAS Awards	2020	Best Actor	Jansen Magpusao	Nominated	
FAMAS Awards	2020	Best Supporting Actress	Meryll Soriano	Nominated	
Gawad Urian Awards	2020	Best Picture "Pinakamahusay na Pelikula"	John Denver Trending	Nominated	
Gawad Urian Awards	2020	Best Director "Pinakamahusay na Direksyon"	Arden Rod Condez	Nominated	
Gawad Urian Awards	2020	Best Actor "Pinakamahusay na Pangunahing Aktor"	Jansen Magpusao	Nominated	
Gawad Urian Awards	2020	Best Supporting Actress "Pinakamahusay na Pangalawang Aktres"	Meryll Soriano	Nominated	
Gawad Urian Awards	2020	Best Screenplay "Pinakamahusay na Dulang Pampelikula"	Arden Rod Condez	Nominated	
Gawad Urian Awards	2020	Best Cinematography "Pinakamahusay na Sinematograpiya"	Rommel Sales	Nominated	
5th Hanoi International Film Festival	2018	Best Project	John Denver Trending	Won	
Luna Awards	2020	Best Director	Arden Rod Condez	Nominated	
Luna Awards	2020	Best Actor	Jansen Magpusao	Won	
Luna Awards	2020	Best Supporting Actress	Meryll Soriano	Won	
PMPC Star Awards for Movies	2021	Indie Movie of the Year	John Denver Trending	Nominated	
PMPC Star Awards for Movies	2021	Indie Movie Director of the Year	Arden Rod Condez	Nominated	
PMPC Star Awards for Movies	2021	Movie Supporting Aactress of the Year	Meryll Soriano	Nominated	
PMPC Star Awards for Movies	2021	New Movie Actor of the Year	Jansen Magpusao	Nominated	
PMPC Star Awards for Movies	2021	Indie Movie Ensemble Acting of the Year	John Denver Trending	Won	
PMPC Star Awards for Movies	2021	Indie Movie Screenwriter of the Year	Arden Rod Condez	Won	
PMPC Star Awards for Movies	2021	Indie Movie Cinematographer of the Year	Rommel Sales	Nominated	
PMPC Star Awards for Movies	2021	Indie Movie Editor of the Year	Benjo Ferrer	Won	
PMPC Star Awards for Movies	2021	Indie Movie Production Designer of the Year	Harley Alcasid	Nominated	
PMPC Star Awards for Movies	2021	Indie Movie Musical Scorer of the Year	Len Calvo	Nominated	
PMPC Star Awards for Movies	2021	Indie Movie Sound Engineer of the Year	Mikko Quizon and Kat Salinas	Nominated	
26th Vesoul International Film Festival of Asian Cinema	2020	Best Film Golden Wheel	Arden Rod Condez	Nominated	
26th Vesoul International Film Festival of Asian Cinema	2020	Audience Award Feature	John Denver Trending	Won	
26th Vesoul International Film Festival of Asian Cinema	2020	Best Film Critics Jury Award	Arden Rod Condez	Won	
26th Vesoul International Film Festival of Asian Cinema	2020	Jury Prize of the International Jury	Arden Rod Condez	Won	
Young Critics Circle	2020	Best Performance	Jansen Magpusao	Nominated	
Young Critics Circle	2020	Best Screenplay	Arden Rod Condez	Nominated	
Young Critics Circle	2020	Best Achievement in Film Editing	Benjo Ferrer	Nominated	
Young Critics Circle	2020	Best Achievement in Cinematography and Visual Design	Rommel Sales (Cinematographer) and Harley Alcasid (Production Design)	Nominated	
Young Critics Circle	2020	Best Achievement in Sound and Aural Orchestration	Len Calvo, Mikko Quizon, Kat Salinas	Nominated	
Young Critics Circle	2020	Best First Feature	Arden Rod Condez	Won	
