= Man of the World (album) =

Studio album by Demis Roussos
- Released: 1980
- Studio: Kendun Recorders, The Factory, "The Roundhouse", Air Studios
- Label: Mercury
- Producer: David Mackay

Demis Roussos chronology
Universum (1979)	Man of the World (1980)	Demis (1982)

Singles from Man of the World
- 1. "Lost in Love" Released: 1980; 2. "I Need You" Released: 1980; 3. "Sorry" Released: 1980; 4. "San Pedro's Children" Released: 1980

Singles from Hombre del mundo (Man of the World)
- 1. "Cancion de boda (The Wedding Song)" Released: 1980

Man of the World is a studio album by Greek singer Demis Roussos, released in 1980 on Mercury Records.

== Commercial performance ==
The album reached no. 36 in the Netherlands.

== Track listing ==
All tracks produced by David Mackay for the Round Record Co. Ltd.

Side A
No.	Title	Writer(s)	Length
1.	"Man of the World / Shlacham Dance"	Peter Green ("Man of the World"); David Mackay ("Shlacham Dance")	4:23
2.	"Lost in Love" (featuring Florence Warner)	Graham Russell	3:30
3.	"Miss You Nights"	Dave Townsend	3:54
4.	"Little Girl" (featuring Jennifer Warnes)	Thomas Alexander Harvey	2:48
5.	"I Need You"	B. Hart / B. Richards	4:00
6.	"I'd Give My Life"	Barry Mann	2:59

Side B
No.	Title	Writer(s)	Length
1.	"Sorry"	Francis Rossi / Bernie Frost	4:14
2.	"How Glad I Am You Came" (featuring Rev. James Cleveland Choir)	Roger Cook / Charles Cochran	3:03
3.	"San Pedros Children"	Jim Peterik	4:11
4.	"The Wedding Song" (featuring Linda Taylor)	Harry Nilsson / Perry Botkin Jr.	3:34
5.	"Love It Away"	Troy Seals / Eddie Setser	3:18
6.	"We're Over"	Barry Mann	2:25

=== Italian version ===
Side A
No.	Title	Writer(s)	Length
5.	"Credo"	Giorgio Calabrese	4:00

Side B
No.	Title	Writer(s)	Length
2.	"Nascerà (Highway Home)"	John Bettis / Yaïr Klinger / Cristiano Minellono	3:10

=== Spanish version Hombre del mundo (Man of the World) ===
Side B
No.	Title	Length
4.	"Canción de boda (The Wedding Song)" (featuring Linda Taylor)

== Charts ==
Chart (1980)	Peak position
Dutch Albums (Album Top 100)	36
