= Florence Warner =

American singer (1947–2024)

- Born: March 22, 1947; Athens, Georgia, U.S.
- Died: September 17, 2024 (aged 77) Philadelphia, Pennsylvania, U.S.
- Genres: Pop
- Occupation: Singer
- Instrument: Vocals
- Spouse: Alan Jones (deceased)

Florence Warner (March 22, 1947 – September 17, 2024) was an American singer who worked mainly in recordings of television commercials, including the "Hello News" image campaign from Gari Communications.

Warner was born to Byron – a singer and teacher – and Florence Warner – a dancer – in Athens, Georgia. She appeared on several recordings in the 1970s and early 1980s, including a duet with Demis Roussos on his cover of Air Supply's "Lost in Love" (from the 1980 album, Man of the World) which became a No. 2 hit in de Dutch Top 40 in May 1980. Her recording of the song "Pirate" was selected by Philips for inclusion on the demonstration disc (810 027–2) that came with the first compact disc players, such as the Philips model CD200. In 1984, she sang on the ABC network campaign, "We're With You on ABC".

Warner was married to Alan Jones, with whom she had a daughter.

Warner died at her home in Philadelphia on September 17, 2024, after a long illness. She was 77.

== Recordings ==
=== Studio albums ===
- Florence Warner (1974, vinyl LP)
- Another Hot Night (1981, vinyl LP)
- Just Believe It (1982, vinyl LP)

=== Singles ===
- "The Status Cymbal" (1970 with Byron Warner & Tom Porter)
- "For No Good Reason" (1973; 7" vinyl single)
- "Anyway I Love You" (1975, 7" vinyl single)
- "Lost in Love" (1980) – duet with Demis Roussos
- "Hello Love" (1980, 7" vinyl single)
- "Hold Me Once" (1981, 7" vinyl single)
- "I Miss Your Heartbeat" (1981, 7" vinyl single)
- "Once Upon A Time With Me (Theme Song From "Once Upon A Forest")" (1993, 12" single) – duet with The New London Children's Choir
- "Out of the Blue" (1982, 7" vinyl single)
- "Once Upon A Time With Me (Once Upon a Forest's 20th Anniversary)" (2013, original version) – duet with Kate Winslet
- "Once Upon A Time With Me (Once Upon a Forest's First 25 Years)" (2018, original version) – duet with Wendy Moten

=== Backing vocals ===
- Jem (1985–1988; including the singing voice of Kimber Benton on the song "I'm Okay" with Lani Groves as the singing voice of Stormer)
- Grail: The Rock Musical of the Future (1999)
- Portrait: The Music of Dan Fogelberg From 1972-1997 (1997)
- Troubadour The Definitive Collection 1964-1976 – Donovan – (1992)
- Gold Expanded Edition: More Collection of Steely Dan Songs – Steely Dan (1982)
- Greatest Hits (Dan Fogelberg album) (1982)
- Somewhere Over China – Jimmy Buffett (1982)
- Bare – Bobby Bare (1978)
- Twin Sons of Different Mothers – Dan Fogelberg and Tim Weisberg (1978)
- Old – Guy Clark (1975)
- 7-Tease – Donovan (1974)
- Stardancer – Tom Rapp (1972)
- Blue River – Eric Andersen (1971)
