= Quiet Night In =

- Directed by: Christopher Banks
- Written by: Christopher Banks
- Produced by: Christopher Banks
- Starring: Nicolette Kenny; Richard Lambeth; Lucy Gay; Brian McKay; Kittichon Helviphat; Brian Moore
- Cinematography: Neil Morrison
- Music by: Frank Smile; Christopher Banks; Patsy Riggir; Wolfgang Amadeus Mozart
- Distributed by: Arkles Entertainment(Australasia)
- Release date: 25 June 2005 (ReelHeART International Film Festival)
- Running time: 87 minutes
- Country: New Zealand
- Language: English

Quiet Night In is a 2005 New Zealand film written, produced and directed by Christopher Banks. It premiered at the Stratford-upon-Avon International Digital Film Festival in the United Kingdom.

== Plot ==
The plot concerns would-be novelist Jess Bartlett, who stages a quiet night in to finish her new book, but is frustrated in her attempts by the arrival of a troubled footballer, a manic TV advice show host, a randy old author and his teenage toy-boy.

== Cast details ==
Christopher Banks says he wrote the film specifically with actress and musician Nicolette Kenny in mind, after they had worked together on previous music projects, including a pair of Australasian hit singles.

Richard Lambeth had previously made appearances in the cult TV series Atlantis High and Being Eve, Lucy Gay, Brian McKay and Christopher Banks starred in the gay film festival film All About Reinalda, and Brian Moore appeared as Monat in the TV adaptation of the Riverworld novels.

== Cast ==
- Nicolette Kenny as Jess
- Richard Lambeth as Rob
- Lucy Gay as Rebecca
- Brian McKay as Lawrence
- Kittichon Helviphat as William
