= Infinity (Deep Obsession album) =

Studio album by Deep Obsession
- Released: 1999
- Genre: Euro-dance, pop
- Length: 45:53
- Label: Universal Music NZ
- Producer: Chris Banks, Michael Lloyd, Steve Peach, Paul Goodyear

Deep Obsession chronology
| Infinity (1999) | Infinity (Japan Remix Album) (2000) |

Singles from Infinity
- 1. "Lost in Love" Released: 1998; 2. "Cold" Released: 1999; 3. "One & Only" Released: 1999; 4. "You Got the Feeling" Released: 2000; 5. "I Surrender" Released: 2000

Infinity is the debut album from New Zealand pop duo Deep Obsession. The album peaked at No.8 in the New Zealand album chart, and included three No.1 singles.

== Awards and nominations ==
At the 2000 New Zealand Music Awards, the album was honoured with five nominations - Top Group - Deep Obsession, Best Cover - "Lost in Love", Best Song - "Cold" (written by Zara Clark/Chris Banks)', Top Female Vocalist - Zara Clark, (for her work on the 'Infinity' album) Most Promising Female Vocalist - Vanessa Kelly (Vanessa sings 'The Power in You' from "Infinity" album) At the 2001 New Zealand Music Awards, Deep Obsession was nominated for'International Achievement Award'. In May 2015 NZ Top 40 charts Ruby Awards, Deep Obsession was nominated and won for achieving three consecutive Number One songs from their début album 'Infinity'

== Track listing ==
Infinity
| No. | Title | Length |
|---|---|---|
| 1. | "Falling Out of Love" | 4:05 |
| 2. | "Cold" | 4:00 |
| 3. | "One & Only" | 3:47 |
| 4. | "Vanishing Man" | 4:10 |
| 5. | "You Got the Feeling" | 3:39 |
| 6. | "Would You?" | 4:25 |
| 7. | "Lost in Love" | 4:25 |
| 8. | "Be Real" | 3:54 |
| 9. | "The Power in You" | 4:15 |
| 10. | "Experience +" | 3:59 |
| 11. | "I Surrender" | 5:14 |

Japanese remix version (2000)
| No. | Title | Length |
|---|---|---|
| 1. | "One & Only" | 3:28 |
| 2. | "Lost in Love" | 3:24 |
| 3. | "Cold" | 3:16 |
| 4. | "I Surrender" | 4:18 |
| 5. | "Vanishing Man" | 3:26 |
| 6. | "You Got the Feeling" | 3:08 |
| 7. | "Be Real" | 3:52 |
| 8. | "Falling Out of Love" | 4:02 |
| 9. | "The Power in You" | 4:15 |
| 10. | "Would You?" | 4:21 |
| 11. | "One & Only" (Extended version) | 5:01 |
| 12. | "Cold" (Extended version) | 4:26 |
| 13. | "Experience +" | 3:57 |

== Charts and certifications ==
=== Weekly charts ===
| Chart (1999) | Peak position |
|---|---|
| New Zealand Albums (RMNZ) | 8 |

=== Certifications ===
| Region | Certification | Sales/shipments |
|---|---|---|
| New Zealand (RMNZ) | Platinum | 15,000^ |
^shipments figures based on certification alone
