= Now and Forever (Air Supply album) =

1982 studio album by Air Supply

Studio album by Air Supply
- Released: 1 June 1982
- Recorded: 1981–1982
- Studios: Paradise Studios (Sydney, New South Wales, Australia); Allen Zentz Recording (San Clemente, California, USA)
- Genre: Soft rock
- Label: Big Time/Arista/EMI
- Producer: Harry Maslin

Air Supply chronology
The One That You Love (1981)	Now and Forever (1982)	Greatest Hits (1983)

Singles from Now and Forever
- 1. "Even the Nights Are Better" Released: June 1982; 2. "Young Love" Released: September 1982; 3. "Two Less Lonely People in the World" Released: November 1982; 4. "Now and Forever" Released: 1982

Professional ratings
Review scores
Source	Rating
AllMusic	2.5/5 stars

Now and Forever is the seventh studio album by British-Australian soft rock group Air Supply, released in 1982. It peaked at No. 25 on the US charts, and it reached at No. 1 on the Japanese (Oricon International Albums Chart) for 5 consecutive weeks from June 28, 1982. The album contains the hit "Even the Nights Are Better" (#5), along with the minor hits "Young Love" (#38) and "Two Less Lonely People in the World" (#38).

== Track listing ==
=== International release ===
Side one
No.	Title	Writer(s)	Length
1.	"Now and Forever"	Graham Russell	3:50
2.	"Even the Nights Are Better"	Terry Skinner; J. L. Wallace; Ken Bell	3:57
3.	"Young Love"	Russell	4:00
4.	"Two Less Lonely People in the World"	Howard Greenfield; Ken Hirsch	3:59
5.	"Taking the Chance"	Russell	4:12

Side two
No.	Title	Writer(s)	Length
1.	"Come What May"	Russell; Tom Snow; Cynthia Weil	3:56
2.	"One Step Closer"	Russell	3:49
3.	"Don't Be Afraid"	Frank Esler-Smith; Russell	3:20
4.	"She Never Heard Me Call"	Rex Goh; Russell	3:24
5.	"What Kind of Girl"	Goh; Russell	3:50
Total length:			38:17

=== Australia/New Zealand release ===
Side one
No.	Title	Writer(s)	Length
1.	"Now and Forever"	Russell	3:50
2.	"Even the Nights Are Better"	Skinner; Wallace; Bell	4:00
3.	"Young Love"	Russell	4:02
4.	"Two Less Lonely People in the World"	Greenfield; Hirsch	4:00
5.	"I'm Late Again"	Goh; Russell	4:18

Side two
No.	Title	Writer(s)	Length
1.	"Come What May"	Russell; Snow; Weil	3:56
2.	"Don't Be Afraid"	Esler-Smith; Russell	3:20
3.	"One Step Closer"	Russell	3:49
4.	"She Never Heard Me Call"	Goh; Russell	3:24
5.	"What Kind of Girl"	Goh; Russell	3:50
Total length:			38:29

== Personnel ==
Air Supply

- Graham Russell – lead vocals, rhythm guitars
- Russell Hitchcock – lead vocals
- Frank Esler-Smith – keyboards, orchestra arrangements and conductor
- David Moyse – lead guitars
- Rex Goh – lead guitars
- David Green – bass
- Ralph Cooper – drums

== Production ==
- Harry Maslin – producer, engineer, mixing
- John Van Nest – mixing, assistant engineer
- Karen Hewitt – assistant engineer
- Chris Bellman – mastering at Allen Zentz Mastering (San Clemente, California, USA)
- Donn Davenport – art direction
- The Image Bank – front cover photography
- Leon Lecash – back cover photography
- Lindsay Matthews – back cover photography
- Cindy Lecash – styling

== Charts ==
Chart (1982)	Peak position
Australian (Kent Music Report)	27
Canada Top Albums/CDs (RPM)	18
US Billboard 200	25

== Certifications and sales ==
Region	Certification	Certified units/sales
Canada (Music Canada)	Platinum	100,000^{^}
United States (RIAA)	Platinum	1,000,000^{^}
^{^} Shipments figures based on certification alone.
