= Roger Capey =

New Zealand hockey player

Personal information
- Full name: Roger Clifford Capey
- Born: 27 February 1945 Whangārei, New Zealand
- Died: 2 March 2000 (aged 55)

Sport
- Country: New Zealand
- Sport: Field hockey

Roger Clifford Capey (27 February 1945 – 2 March 2000) was a New Zealand field hockey player. He competed in the men's tournament at the 1968 Summer Olympics.

Capey died on 2 March 2000.
