= Here I Am (Air Supply song) =

1981 single by Air Supply

"Here I Am (Just When I Thought I Was Over You)"
- A-side label of the Australian vinyl single

Single by Air Supply

from the album The One That You Love
- B-side: "Don't Turn Me Away"
- Released: 31 August 1981
- Genre: Soft rock
- Length: 3:50
- Label: Big Time; Arista (US)
- Songwriter: Norman Sallitt
- Producer: Harry Maslin

Air Supply singles chronology
"The One That You Love" (1981)	"Here I Am (Just When I Thought I Was Over You)" (1981)	"Sweet Dreams" (1981)

"Here I Am" (also titled as "Here I Am (Just When I Thought I Was Over You)") is a song written and first recorded by Norman Saleet and released as a single in 1980 on RCA Records. It was recorded the following year by the British/Australian soft rock duo Air Supply and released as the second single from their sixth studio album The One That You Love.

== Background ==
"Here I Am" was written by singer-songwriter Norman Saleet who released it as a single in 1980, backed with "This Time I Know It's Real". Both songs appear on Saleet's 1982 sole studio album Here I Am.

In 1981, Air Supply released their version which was a top 5 hit in the US. To prevent confusion, the song was originally released as "Here I Am" on the LP but was re-titled "Here I Am (Just When I Thought I Was Over You)" for the release of the single, so as not to be confused with the group's No. 1 hit song "The One That You Love" earlier in the year which contains the lyrics: "Here I am, the one that you love." Lead vocals on "Here I Am (Just When I Thought I Was Over You)" were performed by Russell Hitchcock. Record World described it as an "elegantly harmonized ballad."

== Chart performance ==
Air Supply's version was released as a single in the fall of 1981, and peaked at No. 5 on the Billboard Hot 100 chart in November of that year, remaining in the top 40 for 15 weeks. The song also spent three weeks atop the Billboard Adult Contemporary chart.

== Charts ==
=== Weekly charts ===
Chart (1981–1982)	Peak position
Australia Kent Music Report	43
Canada RPM Top Singles	18
Canada RPM Adult Contemporary	5
US Billboard Hot 100	5
US Adult Contemporary (Billboard)	1
US Cash Box Top 100	5

=== Year-end charts ===
Chart (1981)	Rank
US Adult Contemporary (Billboard)	17
US Cash Box	27

Chart (1982)	Rank
US Billboard Hot 100	80
US Adult Contemporary (Billboard)	21

== Reception ==
Reviewing a live performance of the song in 2013 for The Paris Review, Robin Hemley described it as sounding "kind of like Every Other Song in the World to Me".

== Personnel ==
- Russell Hitchcock – vocals
- Graham Russell – vocals, guitar
- Bill Linnane – piano

== See also ==
- List of Billboard Adult Contemporary number ones of 1981
