= Two Less Lonely People in the World =

1982 single by Air Supply

Single by Air Supply

from the album Now and Forever
- B-side: "What Kind of Girl"
- Released: November 1982
- Recorded: 1982
- Genre: Soft rock
- Length: 3:59
- Label: Arista (US)
- Songwriters: Howard Greenfield, Ken Hirsch
- Producer: Harry Maslin

Air Supply singles chronology
"Young Love" (1982)	"Two Less Lonely People in the World" (1982)	"Making Love Out of Nothing at All" (1983)

"Two Less Lonely People in the World" is a song by Australian soft rock band Air Supply, from their 1982 album Now and Forever. It was the third of three singles released from the album.

The song reached number 38 on the US Billboard Hot 100 and number 33 on Cash Box in January 1983. It also charted modestly in Australia. Written by Ken Hirsch and veteran lyricist Howard Greenfield, it provided a rare hit for Greenfield decades after his 1960s heyday, and one of the last before his death.

"Two Less Lonely People in the World" was a hit on adult contemporary radio in Canada and the United States, reaching number two in Canada, and three weeks at number four in the US.

Billboard said that "The group's sentimental sound is so distinctive that the new single is instantly familiar."

In 2017, a cover of the song by KZ Tandingan was used in the film Kita Kita and went to #1 in the Philippines.

== Charts ==
=== Weekly charts ===
Chart (1982–83)	Peak position
Australia (Kent Music Report)	46
Canadian RPM Adult Contemporary	2
US Billboard Hot 100	38
US Adult Contemporary (Billboard)	4
US Cash Box Top 100	33

=== Year-end charts ===
Chart (1983)	Position
US Adult Contemporary (Billboard)	49
