= Quezon's Game =

- Directed by: Matthew Rosen
- Written by: Janice Y. Perez; Dean Rosen
- Produced by: Carlo Katigbak; Olivia M. Lamasan
- Starring: Raymond Bagatsing
- Music by: Dean Rosen
- Production companies: ABS-CBN Film Productions; Kinetek Productions
- Distributed by: Star Cinema
- Release dates: 16 December 2018 (Canada); 29 May 2019 (Philippines)
- Running time: 125 minutes
- Country: Philippines
- Languages: Filipino; English; Spanish
- Budget: ₱25 million ($500 thousand)

Quezon's Game is a 2018 Philippine biographical drama film directed by Matthew Rosen. The film centers on Philippine President Manuel L. Quezon and his plan to shelter German and Austrian Jews in the Philippines who were fleeing Nazi Germany during the pre-World War II era.

== Premise ==
In 1938, Philippine President Manuel L. Quezon, military adviser Dwight D. Eisenhower, along with other notable figures, set out to rescue Jewish refugees fleeing Nazi Germany. Quezon simultaneously deals with a relapse of tuberculosis.

== Plot ==
In 1944, exiled Philippine president Manuel L. Quezon lingers from tuberculosis beside his wife Aurora at Saranac Lake, New York. After watching a newsreel about the Holocaust, Quezon asks, "Could I have done more?"

In 1938 Manila, Jewish-American businessman Alex Frieder receives a confidential telegram from a Chinese consulate in Vienna about the impending Holocaust. On the same day, the new chief of security of the German consulate in Manila, Lt. Ebner, arrives and presents himself to US High Commissioner Paul McNutt. Frieder, McNutt, and assistant US military adviser Colonel Dwight D. Eisenhower arrive at a party where President Quezon announces his project for the new Philippine capital, Balintawak. Frieder privately informs them of the telegram he received and asks for help in bringing refugees to the Philippines. Quezon agrees but says that he can only wait for approval from US Congress for additional exit visas. Ebner, who is an SS officer, arrives at the office of German consul Kaiser that same night, demanding that the consulate fly the Nazi flag and warning of the Kristallnacht.

Following news of the Kristallnacht and the expulsion of the MS St. Louis, Frieder discusses the plan with Quezon, Eisenhower, and McNutt. McNutt informs the group of the number of remaining visas, which requires Quezon to convince the State Department for an additional 2,000 visas, a request that is challenged by anti-Semitic officials. Frieder places an advertisement in German newspapers that invite professionals who would work in Quezon's planned city. Eisenhower requests his commanding officer, General Douglas MacArthur, for assistance in Quezon's plan. MacArthur strongly disagrees, as he sees the Japanese invasion imminent in the Philippines. While McNutt works with Quezon's reports to be sent to President Roosevelt in Washington DC, US Consul-General Jonathan Cartwright enters their meeting, and expresses strong objection to Quezon's plan, as he states that the Jewish refugees would be a threat to national security. Later, Quezon's wife Aurora, discovers Manuel's tuberculosis after seeing him use a blood-stained handkerchief. McNutt receives 10,000 names, but the group finds it difficult to approve all refugees without raising suspicion. Quezon suggests bribing Kaiser for additional visas in a meeting outside the consulate. In a presidential ball, Kaiser angrily refuses the bribe but agrees to grant the exit papers in full view of Ebner, who also gives his approval while condescendingly treating Quezon in public.

McNutt disappointedly reports to the group that Congress has rejected the request for additional visas, and that they only have 210 visas remaining. Frieder is angered by their plan's failure. Afterward, they proceed to list out the names to be excluded with remorse. The next day, Quezon receives a call that the Secretary of State denied all visas and breaks down in his office. His tuberculosis worsens, but he continues his work as President despite advice not to do so. Quezon then delivers a press conference on racial injustice and border control in the Philippines. This causes protests in Manila against the visa rejections. Following public pressure, the 210 visas and an additional 1,000 visas are approved. The Jewish refugees arrive in front of Quezon's residence and are welcomed by the Quezons, McNutt, and Frieder.

Back in 1944, Aurora replies to her husband that he has taken action at a time of apathy, and that his act will not be forgotten by Filipinos. The epilogue reveals that over 1,200 Jewish refugees were saved through Quezon's efforts, which were halted by the Japanese invasion. As the credits roll, testimonies from surviving refugees are shown.

== Cast ==
- Raymond Bagatsing as Manuel L. Quezon
- Rachel Alejandro as Aurora Quezon
- Kate Alejandrino as María Aurora "Baby" Quezon
- David Bianco as Dwight D. Eisenhower
- James Paoleli as Paul V. McNutt
- Jennifer Blair-Bianco as Mamie Eisenhower
- Audie Gemora as Sergio Osmeña
- Nor Domingo as Manuel Roxas
- Billy Ray Gallion as Alex Frieder
- Tony Ahn as Herbert Frieder
- Miguel Faustmann as Douglas MacArthur
- Natalia Moon as Vera
- Bernard Carritero as Narciso Ramos
- Gabriel Irabagon as Manuel "Nonong" Quezon Jr.

== Production ==
Quezon's Game is a joint venture production of Star Cinema, iWant, and Kinetek. The film, which had a production budget of US$500,000, was directed by British-Jewish filmmaker Matthew Rosen. Production was finished by October 15, 2018. Rosen spent three months on casting for the film alone. The production staff initially could not find an actor to play as Manuel Quezon, but Lorena Rosen, while watching Pusong Ligaw, found its main cast member Raymond Bagatsing suitable for the role. The film was primarily shot in Las Casas Filipinas de Acuzar, a beach resort in Bataan.

Lorena and Matthew Rosen were responsible for the film's original story idea while Janice Y. Perez and Dean Rosen wrote the screenplay. The film was produced to tell a relatively unknown account of President Manuel L. Quezon rescuing Jewish refugees from the Holocaust and temporarily providing them shelter in the Philippines. One of the challenges the writers dealt during the research phase for Quezon's Game phase was the lack of Filipino historical manuscripts that tackle the historical account. Thus, they referred to theses and dissertations made by Americans and corresponded with the descendants of Alex and Herbert Frieder, who played a major role in Quezon's plan.

Matthew Rosen, a British-born Jewish immigrant who moved to the Philippines in the 1980s, became aware of President Quezon's plan after he learned that his Filipino wife and local children in Manila knew the lyrics to the Jewish folk song "Hava Nagila", while not being aware of its Jewish origin. Rosen started inquiring at a synagogue and its museum in Manila in 2009 where he learned about President Quezon's plan for Jews fleeing Nazi Germany.

Rosen wanted the film to be distinct from Schindler's List, as he described the film to as "about the horrors that man can do" and wanted Quezon's Game to emphasize optimism amidst a "time of darkness". However, he was advised by the producers to feature Quezon's Game "the Philippines' Schindler's List".

== Release ==
Quezon's Game was released in various international film festivals prior to its theatrical release. It was released in Ottawa, Canada as part of the gala event of the 2018 Cinema World Festival as one of the winning films of the 2018 Autumn Selection. It was also an entry in the IndieFEST Film in California, and the WorldFest-Houston International Film Festival in Texas.

As part of the film's promotion, a VIP screening was held on May 7, 2019, at the Power Plant Mall in Makati where ABS-CBN also presented video interviews of Holocaust Survivors Margot Pins Kestenbaum and Max Weissler, who were both provided shelter in the Philippines by Manuel Quezon and currently reside in Israel. The film's theatrical release in the Philippines was on May 29, 2019.

== Spin-off ==
A documentary series in iWant called The Last Manilaners: A Quezon’s Game Documentary was announced in August 2019. The documentary, directed by Nico Hernandez and filmed in Jerusalem, Tel Aviv, and New York, was released on January 27, 2020 in iWant. It discussed the experiences of Jewish refugees in the Philippines from Nazi Germany.

== Reception ==
Quezon's Game received mixed reviews from critics. Rotten Tomatoes, a review aggregator, reports that 45% of 22 surveyed critics gave the film a positive review. On Metacritic, the film has a score of 36 out of 100 based on 6 reviews, indicating "generally unfavorable reviews".

The film received negative reception for its execution, uneven acting, and low production value. Devika Girish of The New York Times expected that the film's premise would result in Quezon's Game be a political thriller, but became disappointed as the film was "stiff and sentimental". The portrayal of the film's antagonists, such as several Nazi and American characters, turned out to be "paper-thin" and crudely painted. However, Girish and other critics considered Bagatsing's acting as Manuel Quezon as what redeems the film from being a "bare-bones production". Other reviewers included Rachel Alejadro's portrayal of Aurora Quezon and David Bianco's role as Dwight Eisenhower effective compared to the supporting actors, although he looked younger than Eisenhower's actual age in the film's setting. Several reviewers, such as Sight and Sound's Hannah McGill and ABS-CBN's Fred Hawson, noted evidence of budget constraints in the film's props, makeup, and acting performances.

Critics highlighted the film's exposition-heavy dialogue, which overshadowed what would have been a climactic confrontation in the film. The film's writing also turned as unsubtle in delivering the film's narrative, according to Gary Goldstein of the Los Angeles Times. The Hollywood Reporter's Frank Scheck questioned whether the portrayal of Quezon's flirting with a cabaret singer was necessary, which he perceived as an attempt to incorporate "tired soap opera" drama in the film. Other reviewers such as Hawson, however, commended the film for its visuals and acting. For Esquire's Mario Alvaro Limos, the film performed well in its storytelling and casting. He argued that although the filming location was influential for its accolades, its setting brought the characters in an "18th century vacationing" distant from Manila's urban setting. Historian Arius Raposas observed points of improvement in presenting the historical background of the film, like Quezon's plans to settle Jewish refugees in Muslim Mindanao, and using the refugees' German citizenship as potential foil to Japanese designs against the Philippines. Despite mixed reception of the film, the reviewers found the end-credits that feature testimonies of the surviving refugees emotionally moving.

== Accolades ==
The film won at least 20 awards as an entry in various international film festivals. In January 2019, Quezon's Game won 12 accolades at the Cinema World Fest Awards in Ottawa, Canada.

Year	Award-Giving Body	Category	Recipient(s) and nominee(s)	Result	Ref
2018	Cinema World Fest Awards	Award of Merit for Drama Feature	Quezon's Game	Won	
2018	Cinema World Fest Awards	Award of Recognition for Directing	Matthew Rosen	Won	
2018	Cinema World Fest Awards	Award of Excellence for Actor	Raymond Bagatsing	Won	
2018	Cinema World Fest Awards	Award of Excellence for Actress	Rachel Alejandro	Won	
2018	Cinema World Fest Awards	Award of Excellence for Supporting Actor	Billy Ray Gallion	Won	
2018	Cinema World Fest Awards	Award of Excellence for Lighting	Matthew Rosen; Leo Santos	Won	
2018	Cinema World Fest Awards	Award of Excellence for Original Score	Dean Rosen	Won	
2018	Cinema World Fest Awards	Award of Excellence for Produced Screenplay	Janice Perez; Dean Rosen	Won	
2018	Cinema World Fest Awards	Award of Excellence for Set Design	Rowella Talusig; Set Construction Group	Won	
2018	Cinema World Fest Awards	Award of Excellence for Sound Design	Anglea Pereyra	Won	
2018	Cinema World Fest Awards	Award of Excellence for Costume Design	Rowella Talusig and Quezon's Game costume team	Won	
2018	Cinema World Fest Awards	Award of Merit for Color Treatment	Antonette Gozum	Won	
2019	WorldFest-Houston International Film Festival	Best Foreign Movie	Quezon's Game	Won	
2019	WorldFest-Houston International Film Festival	Gold Remi Awards for Best Art Design	Quezon's Game	Won	
2019	WorldFest-Houston International Film Festival	Gold Remi Awards for Best Producers	Carlo Katigbak; Olivia Lamasan; Linggit Tan-Marasigan; Lorena Rosen	Won	
2019	WorldFest-Houston International Film Festival	Gold Remi Awards for Best Director	Matthew Rosen	Won	
2020	7th Urduja Heritage Film Awards	Best Heritage Film	Quezon's Game	Won	
2020	7th Urduja Heritage Film Awards	Best Actor	Raymond Bagatsing	Won	
2020	7th Urduja Heritage Film Awards	Best Supporting Actor	Billy Ray Gallion	Won	
2020	7th Urduja Heritage Film Awards	Best Supporting Actress	Rachel Alejandro	Won	
2020	7th Urduja Heritage Film Awards	Best Actor in a Cameo Role	Audie Gemora	Won	
2020	7th Urduja Heritage Film Awards	Best Director	Matthew Rosen	Won	
2020	7th Urduja Heritage Film Awards	Best Cinematography	Matthew Rosen	Won	
2020	7th Urduja Heritage Film Awards	Best Production Design	Matthew Rosen	Won	
2020	7th Urduja Heritage Film Awards	Best Sceeenplay	Dean Rosen	Won	

== See also ==
- List of Holocaust films
- Quezon
