= Chloe McMillan =

New Zealand freestyle skier

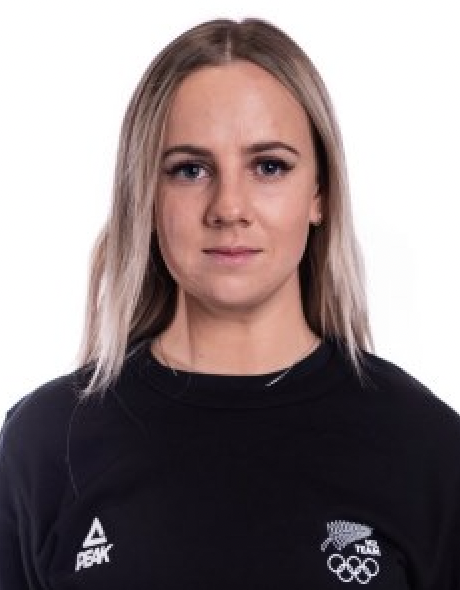
- McMillan in 2022

Personal information
- Born: 29 May 2000 (age 24); Hamilton, New Zealand
- Height: 1.56 m (5 ft 1 in)

Sport
- Country: New Zealand
- Sport: Freestyle skiing
- Event: Halfpipe
- Coached by: Benjamin Boyd; Brett Esser; Britt Hawes; Kat Alexander

Chloe McMillan (born 29 May 2000) is a New Zealand freestyle skier who specialises in halfpipe. She is representing New Zealand at the 2022 Winter Olympics in Beijing.

== Biography ==
McMillan was born in Hamilton on 29 May 2000, the daughter of Ross and Sally McMillan, and younger sister to Zak McMillan. When she was three years old, she began skiing at Mount Ruapehu She was educated at St Peter's School, Cambridge, from 2012 to 2017, before completing her secondary education at Mount Aspiring College in Wānaka in 2018.

McMillian made her FIS Freestyle Ski World Cup debut in the 2017–2018 season, with a 25th placing at Snowmass in January 2018. In the following three seasons, she was 23rd, 31st, and 18th, respectively, in the World Cup halfpipe rankings. She competed in the freeski halfpipe at the 2021 World Championships, placing 14th.
