= Every Woman in the World =

1980 single by Air Supply

Single by Air Supply

from the album Lost in Love
- B-side: "Having You Near Me" / "My Best Friend"
- Released: October 1980
- Genre: Soft rock
- Length: 3:25
- Label: Arista
- Songwriters: Dominic Bugatti; Frank Musker
- Producers: Robie Porter; Harry Maslin

Air Supply singles chronology
"All Out of Love" (1980)	"Every Woman in the World" (1980)	"The One That You Love" (1981)

Music video
- "Every Woman in the World" on YouTube

Professional ratings
Review scores
Source	Rating
Billboard	(unrated)

"Every Woman in the World" is a song by British/Australian soft rock duo Air Supply. The song was written by Dominic Bugatti and Frank Musker. It was the third release from their fifth studio album, Lost in Love.

The song was most popular in the US, where it peaked at number five on the Billboard Hot 100 in 1981 and number two on the Adult Contemporary chart. Outside the US, it also reached number seven in New Zealand and number eight in Australia.

== Reception ==
Billboard called it a "melodic midtempo tune filled with lyrical and instrumental hooks." Record World said that it has "honeyed harmonies" and "a heartwarming hook."

== Personnel ==
- Russell Hitchcock – vocals
- Graham Russell – vocals, guitar

== Chart performance ==
=== Weekly charts ===
Chart (1980–81)	Peak position
Australia (Kent Music Report)	8
Canada RPM Top Singles	3
New Zealand (Recorded Music NZ)	7
US Billboard Hot 100	5
US Adult Contemporary (Billboard)	2
US Cash Box Top 100	9
US Record World	3

=== Year-end charts ===
Chart (1981)	Rank
Australia (Kent Music Report)	67
US Billboard Hot 100	27
US Cash Box	65
