= Sweet Dreams (Air Supply song) =

1981 single by Air Supply

Single by Air Supply

from the album The One That You Love
- B-side: "Don't Turn Me Away"
- Released: December 1981
- Recorded: 1981
- Genre: Soft rock
- Length: 3:46 (single version); 5:22 (album version)
- Label: Arista
- Songwriter: Graham Russell
- Producer: Harry Maslin

Air Supply singles chronology
"Here I Am" (1981)	"Sweet Dreams" (1981)	"I'll Never Get Enough of You" (1981)

"Sweet Dreams" is a song by English/Australian soft rock duo Air Supply from their sixth album, The One That You Love. The song reached No. 5 on the Billboard Hot 100 and No. 4 on the Adult Contemporary chart in early 1982. The song also reached No. 8 on Cash Box. In Canada, it peaked at No. 14 on the RPM Top 100 and No. 15 on the Adult Contemporary chart.

Record World described the song as an "emotional ballad" in which singers "Graham Russell and Russell Hitchcock give a command performance."

== Track listing ==
U.S. 7" single
A. "Sweet Dreams" - 3:46
B. "Don't Turn Me Away" - 3:39

== Charts ==
=== Weekly charts ===
Chart (1981–1982)	Peak position
Canada Top Singles (RPM)	14
Canada Adult Contemporary (RPM)	15
US Billboard Hot 100	5
US Adult Contemporary (Billboard)	4
US Cash Box	8

=== Year-end charts ===
Chart (1982)	Rank
US Top Pop Singles (Billboard)	28
US Cash Box	48
