= The One That You Love =

1981 single by Air Supply

Single by Air Supply

from the album The One That You Love
- B-side: "I Want to Give It All"
- Released: 30 April 1981
- Recorded: 1980
- Genre: Soft rock
- Length: 4:17
- Label: Arista
- Songwriter: Graham Russell
- Producer: Harry Maslin

Air Supply singles chronology
"Every Woman in the World" (1980)	"The One That You Love" (1981)	"Here I Am (Just When I Thought I Was Over You)" (1981)

Music video
- "The One That You Love" on YouTube

"The One That You Love" is a song by British-Australian soft rock duo Air Supply, released as a single from their sixth studio album of the same name. It was written by member Graham Russell. The song reached No. 1 in the United States, topping the Billboard Hot 100 chart on 25 July 1981 and remaining there for one week; it is the duo's only No. 1 hit. The song's lead vocals are sung by Russell Hitchcock. Graham Russell provides backing vocals on this song.

"The One That You Love" also peaked at No. 2 for five weeks on the Adult Contemporary chart, behind "I Don't Need You" by Kenny Rogers.

== Reception ==
Cash Box said "Australia's Air Supply leaps back onto the charts with the title track from its forthcoming follow-up LP. A grandoise, string-laden number, with Graham Russell's [sic] unmistakable vocals, this recaptures the urgent romanticism of 'Lost in Love' and 'All Out Of Love' with plaintive backup vocals." Record World described it as a "loving ballad that can't miss."

== Charts ==
=== Weekly charts ===
Chart (1981)	Peak position
Australian (Kent Music Report)	10
Canada Top Singles (RPM)	3
Canada RPM Adult Contemporary	3
New Zealand (Recorded Music NZ)	26
US Billboard Hot 100	1
US Adult Contemporary (Billboard)	2
US Cash Box Top 100	1
US Record World	1

=== Year-end charts ===
Chart (1981)	Rank
Australia (Kent Music Report)	71
Canada Top Singles (RPM)	59
US Billboard Hot 100	28
US Cash Box Top 100	23

== Certifications ==
Region	Certification	Certified units/sales
Canada (Music Canada)	Gold	75,000^{^}
United States (RIAA)	Gold	1,000,000^{^}
^{^} Shipments figures based on certification alone.

== Personnel ==
- Russell Hitchcock - vocals
- Graham Russell - vocals, guitar

== See also ==
- List of Billboard Hot 100 number-one singles of 1981
