= Lost in Love (Air Supply album) =

1980 studio album by Air Supply

Studio album by Air Supply
- Released: 3 March 1980 (Australia)
- Recorded: 1978−79
- Studios: Trafalgar Studios (Sydney, Australia); Paradise Studios (Sydney); Studios 301 (Sydney); Allen Zentz Recording (San Clemente, California, US); Larrabee Sound Studios (North Hollywood, California, US); Sound Mixers (New York City, New York, US)
- Genre: Soft rock
- Length: 35:27
- Label: Arista
- Producers: Rick Chertoff; Charles Fisher; Harry Maslin; Robie Porter

Air Supply chronology
Life Support (1979)	Lost in Love (1980)	The One That You Love (1981)

Singles from Lost in Love
- 1. "Lost in Love" Released: January 1980; 2. "All Out of Love" Released: 7 February 1980; 3. "Every Woman in the World" Released: October 1980

Professional ratings
Review scores
Source	Rating
AllMusic	4/5 stars

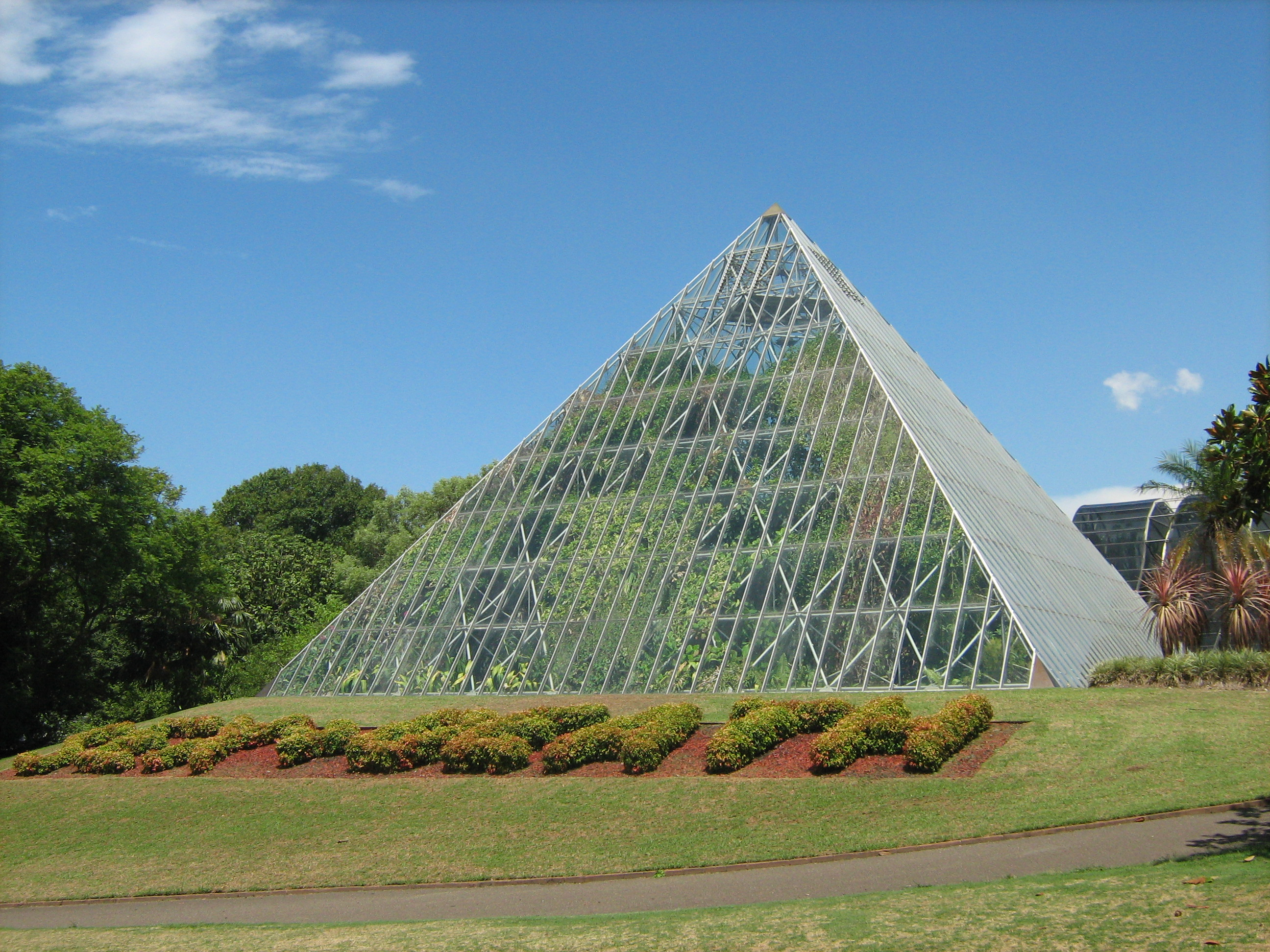
The building used as the backdrop for the album cover

Lost in Love is the fifth studio album by British/Australian soft rock band Air Supply, released in March 1980. Their previous four albums never received much attention outside Australia, but Lost in Love was a success on international charts. In the US, it peaked at No. 22 with three singles reaching the top 5. The album was certified 2× platinum by the RIAA in 1991.

== Overview ==
Hit singles include the title track "Lost in Love", which peaked at No. 3 on the US chart in May 1980 and earned Graham Russell a composer award for "song of the year" and "most played song". The song is considered by many to be their signature song and is admittedly Russell Hitchcock's favourite. The single "All Out of Love" became the biggest hit from the album, reaching No. 2 in the US. It has been regarded as their most famous song, including many interpretations. The third top 5 single of the album, "Every Woman in the World", peaked at No. 5 in the US. Although never a single, "Chances" has been included on many of the band's hits compilations. "Just Another Woman", a disco song, was originally released on the album Life Support, and was also a hit in Malaysia during the 1980s. In Australia, the album sold 20,000 copies.

=== Cover art ===
The album cover was photographed in front of the now-demolished tropical center in the Sydney Botanic Gardens.

== Production ==
The album achieved mainstream popularity because of the work of producer Clive Davis and the band's new contract with Arista Records, introducing the band into the US. This was the first Air Supply album to crack the American charts. This was also the first Air Supply album to feature songs not written by guitarist/vocalist Graham Russell.

== Reaction ==
The album gave Air Supply a huge fan base by the time the album was released and gave the band recognition as "most successful pop group" and "best group of 1981". Critics praised the album as their best studio album along with their follow-up album, The One That You Love.

== Track listing ==
All tracks are written by Graham Russell, except where noted.

Side one
No.	Title	Writer(s)	Length
1.	"Lost in Love"		3:51
2.	"All Out of Love"	Russell; Robie Porter; Clive Davis	3:59
3.	"Every Woman in the World"	Dominic Bugatti; Frank Musker	3:33
4.	"Just Another Woman"		3:51
5.	"Having You Near Me"	Russell; Robie Porter; Clive Davis	3:50

Side two
No.	Title	Writer(s)	Length
1.	"American Hearts"	Dominic Bugatti; Frank Musker	3:13
2.	"Chances"		3:31
3.	"Old Habits Die Hard"	Criston Barker; David Moyse	3:03
4.	"I Can't Get Excited"		5:01
5.	"My Best Friend"		2:32
Total length:			35:27

== Personnel ==
=== Air Supply ===
- Russell Hitchcock – lead vocals, backing vocals
- Graham Russell – lead vocals, backing vocals, rhythm guitars
- Frank Esler-Smith – keyboards, orchestration
- David Moyse – lead guitars, backing vocals
- Criston Barker – bass, backing vocals
- Ralph Cooper – drums, percussion

=== Additional musicians ===
- Sam McNally – keyboards
- Tommy Emmanuel – guitars
- Karl Chandler – tuba
- Tommy Dassalo – triangle, backing vocals
- Robie Porter – orchestration
- Barry Fasman – orchestration (3, 6)
- Nancy Nash – backing vocals (1)
- Marcy Levy – backing vocals (2)

=== Arrangements ===
- Air Supply (1, 2, 4, 5, 7–10)
- Robie Porter
- Barry Fasman (3, 6)
- Harry Maslin (3, 6)

== Production ==
- Clive Davis – executive producer
- Rick Chertoff – producer (1)
- Charles Fisher – producer (1, 4)
- Robie Porter – producer (2, 5, 7–10)
- Harry Maslin – producer (3, 6), mixing (3, 6)
- Martin Harrington – engineer
- Richard Lush – engineer
- Peter Walker – engineer
- William Wittman – mixing (1)
- Jim Hilton – mixing (2, 4, 5, 7–10)
- Linda Corbin – mix assistant (1, 2, 4, 5, 7–10)
- John Van Nest – mix assistant (3, 6)
- John Golden – mastering at Kendun Recorders (Burbank, California)
- Howard Fritzon – design
- Patrick Jones – photography

== Charts ==
=== Weekly charts ===
Chart (1980)	Peak position
Argentinean Albums	7
Australian Albums (Kent Music Report)	21
Canada Top Albums/CDs (RPM)	34
US Billboard 200	22

=== Year-end charts ===
Chart (1981)	Position
US Billboard 200	34

== Certifications and sales ==
Region	Certification	Certified units/sales
Canada (Music Canada)	3× Platinum	300,000^{^}
Hong Kong (IFPI Hong Kong)	Gold	10,000^{*}
United States (RIAA)	2× Platinum	2,000,000^{^}
^{*} Sales figures based on certification alone.^{^} Shipments figures based on certification alone.
