= Lost in Love (Air Supply song) =

1980 single by Air Supply

Single by Air Supply

from the album Lost in Love and Life Support
- B-side: "I Don't Want to Lose You"
- Released: 1979 (Australia); January 1980 (US)
- Recorded: 1978
- Genre: Soft rock
- Length: 3:51; 5:34 (Original version)
- Label: Arista
- Songwriter: Graham Russell
- Producers: Robie Porter, Rick Chertoff, Charles Fisher

Air Supply singles chronology
"What a Life" (1978)	"Lost in Love" (1979)	"All Out of Love" (1980)

Music video
- "Lost in Love" on YouTube

"Lost in Love" is a song recorded by the British/Australian soft rock duo Air Supply. The song was written by group member Graham Russell. The original version of the song appeared on the Life Support album in 1979 and was released as a single in Australia, reaching number 13 on the Kent Music Report. The song was remixed for the album of the same name in 1980 and this version was released as a single in the US, reaching number 3 on the Billboard Hot 100.

The song reportedly took Russell just 15 minutes to write and the single was made in a single afternoon. It was among the first he wrote after returning to Australia from touring with Rod Stewart, yet found little work upon his return. Despite being short of money, Russell went on a retreat to South Australia, where he felt the solitude would help him to write new material.

Air Supply's popularity in their native country during the mid to late 1970s had not been matched elsewhere. Russell travelled to England in 1979, and while there, discovered that the group's Australian record label Big Time Records had sold "Lost in Love" to Arista Records in the United States for distribution. Soon thereafter, their song became a hit on the music charts in the US.

Cashbox described it as "soft rock, with elegant acoustic guitar work, glistening harmonies, light rhythm and electric piano touches." Record World called it a "willowy ballad," saying that "the soft vocals and smooth flow are well-suited for soft -rock fans and A/C -pop."

This song was featured in an episode of Family Guy, "Emission Impossible", the 1981 American film Private Lessons, and the Australian film Hotel de Love.

== Personnel ==
- Russell Hitchcock – vocals
- Graham Russell – vocals, guitar
- Frank Esler-Smith – keyboards

== Chart performance ==
Within six weeks after its release, the song made it to the top 40 and was in the top 10 seven weeks after that. It spent four weeks at number three on the Billboard Hot 100 chart in May 1980 and topped the Billboard Adult Contemporary chart for six weeks that same year.

== Music videos ==
There are two music videos for "Lost in Love". One, an official video, has Air Supply singing on a blue background, while their entire band of additional personnel play their music for them. The other one has Air Supply singing live at a concert.

== Charts ==
=== Weekly charts ===
Chart (1979–1980)	Peak position
Australian (Kent Music Report)	13
Canada RPM Top Singles	4
Canada RPM Adult Contemporary	1
France	10
New Zealand (Recorded Music NZ)	3
US Billboard Hot 100	3
US Adult Contemporary (Billboard)	1
US Cashbox Top 100	2

=== Year-end charts ===
Chart (1979)	Rank
Australia (Kent Music Report)	82
New Zealand (RIANZ)	47
Chart (1980)	Rank
Canada	51
US Billboard Hot 100	15
US Cash Box	15

== Certifications ==
Region	Certification	Certified units/sales
New Zealand (RMNZ)	Gold	15,000^{‡}
United States (RIAA)	Gold	500,000^{‡}
^{‡} Sales+streaming figures based on certification alone.

== Dickey Lee and Kathy Burdick version ==
A country music version of "Lost in Love" was recorded later in 1980 by singers Dickey Lee and Kathy Burdick. This version peaked at number 30 on the Billboard Country chart.

== Demis Roussos version ==
"Lost in Love"

Single by Demis Roussos

from the album Man of the World
- Released: 1980
- Label: Mercury
- Songwriter: Graham Russell
- Producer: David Mackay

Demis Roussos singles chronology
"L.O.V.E. Got a Hold of Me" (1978)	"Lost in Love" (1980)	"Follow Me" (1982)

Music video
- "Lost in Love" (Official Video) on YouTube

That same year 1980, Demis Roussos covered the song on his 1980 studio album Man of the World. The recording featured singer Florence Warner. The cover was also released as a single, which reached no. 3 in Belgium (Flanders) and no. 4 in the Netherlands.

The recording was produced by David Mackay.

=== Track listing ===
7" single Mercury 6000 419 (1980, Germany, Netherlands, Portugal, UK, Peru, South Africa, etc.)

A. "Lost in Love" (featuring Florence Warner) (3:31)
B. "Had to Run'" (3:04)

7" single Mercury 6000 601 (1980, Italy)

A. "Lost in Love" (featuring Florence Warner) (3:30)
B. "Nascerà (Highway Home)'" (3:10)

=== Charts ===
Chart (1980)	Peak position
Belgium (Ultratop 50 Flanders)	3
Netherlands (Single Top 100)	4

== Deep Obsession version ==
In 1998, "Lost in Love" was covered by New Zealand pop group Deep Obsession. It was released as their debut single and topped the charts in their homeland, staying at number one for two weeks in August 1998.

== See also ==
- List of Billboard Adult Contemporary number ones of 1980
- List of number-one singles from the 1990s (New Zealand)
