= Frank Esler-Smith =

English music keyboardist (1948–1991)

Frank Esler-Smith (5 June 1948 in London, England – 1 March 1991 in Melbourne, Australia) was an English arranger and keyboard player for Doug Parkinson's Southern Star from 1978 to 1980 before joining the soft rock band Air Supply in their 1980s heyday.

Initially, his pursuits lay elsewhere, as he attended Melbourne University to study architecture. However, his early passion had been classical music, and he would later gain extensive experience as an orchestral conductor in settings as variegated as musical theatre and rock recordings. He first met principal Air Supply members Russell Hitchcock and Graham Russell while he was working with the orchestra in a production of Jesus Christ Superstar that included Hitchcock and Russell as cast members. He collaborated with many other musicians and songwriters throughout his career.

He died of pneumonia in 1991, at the age of 42. According to the website rememberme.org, Esler-Smith also had AIDS.
