= Amanda Villepastour =

Australian-born ethnomusicologist and former professional musician

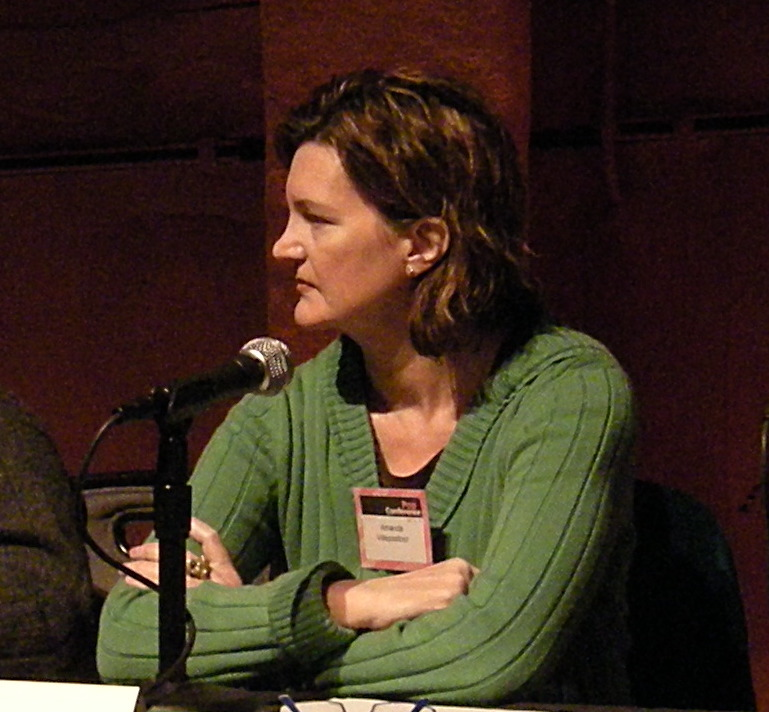
- Villepastour in 2009
- Born: Amanda Vincent; 20 January 1958 (age 68); Perth, Western Australia
- Education: BMus (Composition); CertMT to Adults; MMus (Ethnomusicology); PhD (Ethnomusicology)
- Alma mater: University of Western Australia; Goldsmiths and SOAS, University of London
- Occupations: Professional musician; Ethnomusicologist
- Musical career
- Genres: Indie pop; new wave; pop rock; post-punk
- Occupations: Musician; arranger; songwriter
- Instruments: Piano; keyboards
- Years active: 1970s–1994
- Formerly of: Duck Soup; Eurogliders; (and the backing bands for: Tim Finn; QED; Renée Geyer; Mondo Rock; Jenny Morris; Thompson Twins; Boy George; Gang of Four; Billy Bragg; Black; Yazz)
- Occupation: Ethnomusicologist
- Years active: Since 1995
- Title: Graduate student, Goldsmiths and SOAS, University of London; (1995–2006); Research fellow / Instructor / Ensemble director; (2007–2008); Curator for Africa and Latin America, Musical Instrument Museum, Phoenix, AZ, USA; (2008–2010); Reader, School of Music, Cardiff University, UK; (since 2011)

Academic background
- Thesis: [EThOS uk.bl.ethos.435508 Bata Conversations: Guardianship and Entitlement Narratives about the Bata in Nigeria and Cuba] (2006)
- Academic advisor: Roger Smalley

Academic work
- Discipline: Musicology
- Sub-discipline: Ethnomusicology
- Main interests: Yorùbá music in Nigeria; Afro-Cuban religious (Santería) music
- Website: Amanda Villepastour (Personal Blog)

Amanda Villepastour (née Vincent; born 20 January 1958) is an Australian ethnomusicologist and former professional musician. She is best known for being the keyboardist of the Australian new wave band Eurogliders between 1980 and 1987, and for her 21st-century research work and publications on Yorùbá music in Nigeria, and Afro-Cuban religious (Santería) music in Cuba.

== Early life and education ==
Villepastour was born in Perth, Western Australia. She attended Methodist Ladies' College, in the Perth suburb of Claremont. In the early 1970s, at the age of 14, she started playing music professionally. Between 1974 and 1976, she was the piano and accordion player, and a backing vocalist, in a jug band, Duck Soup. In an interview with Afropop Worldwide published in 2016, she said that Duck Soup had been "a Chicago blues band in Perth".

From 1977 to 1980 Villepastour was an undergraduate student in the then Department of Music at the University of Western Australia. There, she worked with Anglo-Australian composer, pianist and conductor Roger Smalley. She also began playing Javanese Gamelan music under the supervision of Bernard IJzerdraat (Suryabrata), who had studied under Jaap Kunst and trained Mantle Hood, an American ethnomusicologist considered to be the founding father of gamelan in the United States. In 1981, Villepastour graduated with a Bachelor of Music majoring in composition.

== Career ==
=== Eurogliders ===
In 1980 Villepastour and another Perth musician, Bernie Lynch, formed a band. They named it Living Single. Villepastour was to be the keyboardist; Lynch would be the songwriter and guitarist, and would also perform vocals.

The two musicians advertised for other band members. They recruited Crispin Akerman as a second guitarist, Don Meharry as bass player and Guy Slingerland to play drums. The following year, Lynch's then girlfriend, Grace Knight, became the lead vocalist, John Bennetts replaced Slingerland as drummer, and the band's name was changed to Eurogliders. Villepastour later described Eurogliders to Afropop Worldwide as "my own band".

By late 1981 Eurogliders was ready to record a debut studio album. The recording was done in Manila, with Melbourne bass player Geoff Rosenberg replacing Meharry. There was a shortage of studio time in Australia; Knight's autobiography states that Manila was chosen "for budgetary and timing reasons". The band planned to record the album, and then relocate its home base from Perth to Sydney to begin an assault on the eastern states market. However, the recording session had its challenges. According to Knight:

"Given Bernie was the only person who knew what he wanted the record to sound like, the band would strain and argue about whether a chord was right or some such to make it sit with the other instruments. Musically trained, Amanda would back up her assertion with a technical reason why her answer was correct and Bernie would insist it was the sound he wanted, whether it was technically correct or not."

Ultimately the band re-recorded some of the songs and remixed the whole album, which was named Pink Suit Blue Day. Released in June 1982, it peaked at No. 54 on the Australian Kent Music Report album chart. The debut single, "Without You", was released simultaneously, and entered the top 40 singles chart; In the official video of the single, Villepastour had a prominent role, playing both levels of a two manual synthesizer. Knight later wrote that the preferred shots by cameramen of the band included Villepastour on keyboards.

In 1983 Eurogliders replaced Rosenberg with Scott Saunders. In July of that year, the band travelled to the UK, replaced Saunders with Ron François, and recorded its second studio album, This Island. Released in May 1984, the album peaked at No. 4 on the Australian albums chart, and was therefore the most successful of Eurogliders' studio albums.

The third single from This Island, "Heaven (Must Be There)", also released in May 1984, turned out to be Eurogliders' most successful single. It peaked at No. 2 on the Australian singles chart, and also charted in New Zealand, Canada and the USA. Once again, Villepastour starred in the audiovisual presentation of the single: this time, she 'played' tubular bells, and was also the keyboardist, in the Countdown video. The official video of the fourth and final single from This Island, "Maybe Only I Dream", followed suit, with another depiction of Villepastour playing both levels of a two manual synthesizer.

Meanwhile, Eurogliders toured extensively, in Australia, the US, Canada, Puerto Rico, Japan and New Zealand. A highlight of the band's touring program at that time was a lightning trip to New York at the end of 1984, to play in MTV's New Year's Eve special.

In 1985 Eurogliders released its third studio album, Absolutely, which peaked at No. 7 on the Australian album chart. The first three singles from that album, "We Will Together", "The City of Soul" and "Can't Wait to See You", were all top twenty hits; two further singles, "Absolutely" and "So Tough", were released in 1986. In the official video of "Can't Wait to See You", Villepastour is seen playing an L-shaped array of two manual synthesizers, and also performing backing vocals.

In early 1987 Villepastour, Bennetts and Francois all left the band. At the time, Lynch and Knight claimed, and it was reported in the media, that the departures had been voluntary. However, in an interview published in Countdown Memories in 2011, Knight said that, "I do know…. Bernie wasn't happy with how it was going and thought he could do a better job with a different three." When asked by the interviewer whether she thought Villepastour was a "good keyboardist", Knight replied, "I don’t doubt that for a second."

Whatever might have been the reasons for the 1987 line-up change, it did not improve the band's popularity. Eurogliders' fourth album, Groove, peaked at only No. 25 in April 1988, and only one of its singles, "Groove", reached the top 50. In 1989, the band broke up, although Lynch and Knight have since reformed it on several occasions, without ever including any of the other 1983 to 1987 line-up members.

=== Work with other musicians ===
Even while still a member of Eurogliders, Villepastour began working with other musicians, and particularly with solo artists. Her first such collaboration was with Tim Finn: she played synthesizer on his 1983 debut solo album, Escapade. That album peaked at No. 1 in New Zealand and at No. 8 in Australia. Subsequently, Villepastour played keyboards on QED's Animal Magic (1984), Renée Geyer's Sing to Me (1985) and Mondo Rock's self-titled album (1986). She also toured Australia and New Zealand with Tim Finn in 1986.

Shortly after leaving Eurogliders in 1987 Villepastour relocated to the UK. Her first gig there was with the Thompson Twins, with whom she toured the UK, Ireland, the US and Canada that year. After only a few weeks in the UK, she also made a record with Keith Richards and Ronnie Wood. Then, she was recruited by Boy George, for whom she worked for about five years, playing keyboards and writing songs. Between 1987 and 1993, she toured the UK, Europe and Australia with Boy George; her recordings with him include his second and third studio albums Tense Nervous Headache (1988) and Boyfriend (1989), as well as High Hat (1989), a compilation of tracks from those two albums.

Villepastour also continued working with antipodean musicians. She played keyboards, and co-wrote one of the songs, on the soundtrack album Les Patterson Saves the World (1987), and composed music for several television shows. She also played keyboards and organ on Body and Soul (1987), the debut solo studio album by Jenny Morris (ex lead singer of QED), and worked on its follow-up, Shiver (1989). In 1990, she toured the UK, Europe and Australia with Morris, supporting Prince.

Further touring followed, with Gang of Four in the UK, USA and Canada in 1991, with Billy Bragg in Australia, New Zealand and Japan in 1992, with Black in the UK and Turkey in 1993, and with Yazz in the UK in 1994. Villepastour also played keyboards on Billy Bragg's album Don't Try This at Home (1991).

=== Return to academia ===
In 1995 Villepastour made her first trip to Africa. Her intended destination had been Nigeria, but due to the execution of Ken Saro-Wiwa, she was diverted to Ghana. Under the inspiration of that trip, and a chance encounter soon afterwards with Robert Farris Thompson's book Face of the Gods (1993), she decided to study ethnomusicology at a postgraduate level. She began by enrolling for a Certificate in Music Teaching to Adults from Goldsmiths, University of London, which she completed in 1997. The following year, she obtained a master's degree in music in ethnomusicology from SOAS, University of London. In 2006, she was awarded a PhD in ethnomusicology, also from SOAS. Meanwhile, between 2001 and 2008 she was Course Director of Certificate in Music Teaching to Adults at Goldsmiths.

After completing her PhD and spending a short time as a Research Fellow at SOAS, Villepastour relocated to the USA. There, she worked as an Ethnomusicology Instructor and as Director of Afro-Caribbean Ensemble at Bowling Green State University, Ohio, in 2007–2008, and as a Research Fellow at the Smithsonian Institution in Washington DC in 2008.

Villepastour was then recruited as founding Curator for Africa and Latin America at the Musical Instrument Museum (MIM), in Phoenix, Arizona. When the museum officially opened in April 2010, the Phoenix New Times reported that Villepastour and the museum's other four main curators had gone into the field to acquire instruments for the museum's collection. While visiting Africa on field trips, Villepastour had endured hardships including twice losing luggage at an airport and embarking on a 350-mile road trip in a four-wheel-drive vehicle that would not shift into fifth gear. But some of the instruments collected for display in the Africa and the Middle East galleries had never previously been seen publicly. According to Villepastour:

"Africa is not all about drums. The continent has every instrument imaginable, and many African cultures don't drum. For example, South Africa has only three indigenous drumming cultures. "You drive for 30 minutes [in Africa] and it's a totally different world. It's not like driving from Phoenix to Tempe. The clothes, houses, instruments, and the people [in Africa] are all different."

Soon after the museum's opening Villepastour returned to the UK, and took up a position as a lecturer/researcher at the School of Music, Cardiff University. As of 2022, she was a Reader at that School.

=== Academic work ===
Villepastour's academic focus has been on Yorùbá music in Nigeria, and Afro-Cuban religious (Santería) music in Cuba. Her PhD thesis was entitled Bata Conversations: Guardianship and Entitlement Narratives about the Bata in Nigeria and Cuba. Her field work, including as a Curator at the MIM, has taken her to about a dozen sub-Saharan African countries, especially Nigeria, and also to Cuba.

Of particular interest to Villepastour is Batá drumming, and the relationship between language and music, including speech surrogacy in drumming and the technicalities of speech tone in song melody. Her broader research interests include gender and music and organology.

In 2013 Villepastour presented a seminar entitled "Ethnography of a SideWoman" at both St John's College, Oxford University, and Bowling Green State University, giving an ethnomusicological insight into her previous life as "... a session musician who has worked alongside some of Britain's biggest stars."

From 2012 to 2015 Villepastour was Chair of the British Forum for Ethnomusicology (BFE). Since 2015, she has been chair, Study Group for African Music (UK Branch) of the International Council for Traditional Music. In 2016, she received commendation in the BFE Book Prize for her edited collection The Yorùbá God of Drumming: Transatlantic Perspectives on the Wood that Talks. In 2018, her CD Ilú Keké: Transmisión en la Erita won the Special Award for Musicological Research at the Cubadisco music awards.

== Publications ==
Villepastour's publications include:

=== Monographs ===
- Villepastour, Amanda (2010). Ancient Text Messages of the Yorùbá Bàtá Drum: Cracking the Code. SOAS Musicology Series. Farnham, Surrey, UK: Ashgate Publishing. ISBN 9780754667537.

=== Edited collections ===
- Villepastour, Amanda (2013). "Amelia Pedroso: The voice of a Cuban priestess leading from the inside". In Hellier, Ruth (ed.). Women Singers in Global Contexts: Music, Biography, Identity. Urbana, IL, USA: University of Illinois Press. pp. 54–72. ISBN 9780252037245.
- —————————, ed. (2015). The Yorù̀bá God of Drumming: Transatlantic Perspectives on the Wood That Talks. Jackson, MS, USA: University Press of Mississippi. ISBN 9781496802934.
- ————————— (2015). ""Orin Ibeji": (songs for the twins): sounding the sacred twins of the Yorùbá". In Harris, Rachel; Pease, Rowan (eds.). Pieces of the Musical World: Sounds and Culture. New York: Routledge. pp. 169–188. ISBN 9780415723114.
- ————————— (2018). "Speaking with the body in Nigerian and Cuban Orisha music: musical movements in song, dance and trance". In Post, J. C. (ed.). Ethnomusicology: A Contemporary Reader, Volume II. Abingdon and New York: Routledge. ISBN 9781138217874.
- ————————— (2018). "Two heads of the same drum? Musical narratives within a transatlantic religion". In Kenney, E. T.; Salenius, S.; Womack Smith, W. (eds.). Race and Transatlantic Identities. London: Routledge. pp. 56–75. ISBN 9781315211657.
- ————————— (2020). "The Cuban Lexicon Lucumí and African Language Yorùbá: Musical and Historical Connections". In Brunn, Stanley D.; Kehrein, Roland [in German] (eds.). Handbook of the Changing World Language Map. Cham, Switzerland: Springer International Publishing. pp. 2575–2602. doi:10.1007/978-3-030-02438-3_183. ISBN 9783030024376. S2CID 243670904.
