= Can't Wait to See You =

Single by Eurogliders

from the album Absolutely!
- B-side: "I Like To Hear It"
- Released: November 1985
- Studio: Rhinoceros Studios, Sydney
- Genre: Pop rock, new wave
- Label: CBS
- Songwriter: Bernie Lynch
- Producer: Bernie Lynch

Eurogliders singles chronology
"The City of Soul" (1985)	"Can't Wait to See You" (1985)	"Absolutely" (1986)

"Can't Wait to See You" is a song by Australian pop rock group, Eurogliders, released in November 1985 as the third single from their third studio album, Absolutely! (1985). The song peaked at number 8 on the Australian Kent Music Report, becoming the band's third top ten single.

== Background ==
"Can't Wait to See You" appears on Eurogliders' third studio album, Absolutely! (October 1985). It was issued as the album's third single in November behind, "We Will Together" in April and "The City of Soul" in September. It was written by the group's singer and guitarist, Bernie Lynch, and was recorded by the line-up of Lynch with Crispin Akerman on guitar, John Bennetts on drums, percussion and drum programming, Ron François on bass synthesiser and bass guitar, Grace Knight on vocals and Amanda Vincent on keyboards and arranged horns. The album was co-produced by Lynch, Bill Scheniman and Chris Porter.

"Can't Wait to See You" peaked at No. 8 on the Kent Music Report singles chart and became the group's third top ten hit. In December Eurogliders undertook their national Can't Wait To See You Tour starting with 18 dates in New South Wales. The tour was an initiative of Australia's response to the International Youth Year.

== Track listing ==
7" Single

- Side A "Can't Wait to See You"
- Side B "I Like to Hear It"

12" Single

- Side A "Can't Wait to See You" (Extended Mix)
- Side B "Can't Wait to See You" (7" Mix)
- Side B "When The Stars Come Out"

== Chart performance ==
Chart (1985/86)	Peak position
Australia (Kent Music Report)	8
