= Pet Rock (album) =

Studio album by the Sinceros
- Released: 1981
- Genre: Power pop
- Label: Epic
- Producer: Gus Dudgeon, the Sinceros, Paul Riley

The Sinceros chronology
2nd Debut (1980)	Pet Rock (1981)

Pet Rock is the second and final album by English band the Sinceros. The album was released worldwide and achieved moderate commercial success. The album has been released on CD by Wounded Bird. Originally intended to be released under the title 2nd Debut in 1980, the album reached the test pressing stage but was recalled by Epic Records and reworked into Pet Rock under the guidance of producer Gus Dudgeon. Dudgeon is credited with the band and Paul Riley.

== Critical reception ==
Professional ratings
Review scores
Source	Rating
AllMusic	4/5 stars

Trouser Press, comparing the album to the band's debut, wrote that it "removes any trace of oddness and fails to deliver the cleverness that would have redeemed it."

AllMusic deemed the album "potent power-pop, fueled by glistening guitar chords, hummable melodies, Todd Rundgren-ish vocals, and Gus Dudgeon's crystal clear production."

== Track listing ==
All tracks composed by Mark Kjeldsen; except where noted.

1. "Disappearing"
2. "Memory Lane"
3. "Socially"
4. "Down Down"
5. "Barcelona"
6. "Falling In and Out of Love"
7. "Sleight of Hand"
8. "Nothing Changes" (Ron François)
9. "Girl I Realise" (Ron François)
10. "As the World Turns" (Ron François)
11. "Midsong"

== Personnel ==
The Sinceros

- Mark Kjeldsen - guitar, vocals
- Ron François - bass guitar, vocals
- Don Snow - keyboards, vocals
- Bobby Irwin - drums

with:

- Huw Gower - guitar solo on "As the World Turns"

Production credits

(Tracks 1, 2, 4, 5, 9, 11)

- Produced by Gus Dudgeon
- Engineered by Graham Dickson
- Assisted by Mark Chamberlain
- Recorded at CBS Studios, London

(Tracks 6, 8, 10)

- Produced by the Sinceros
- Engineered by Aldo Bocca
- Assisted by Nick Froome
- Recorded at Eden Studios, London
- Remixed by Gus Dudgeon

(Tracks 3, 7)

- Produced & engineered by Paul Riley for Riviera Global Productions Ltd.
- Assisted by Rob Keyloch
- Recorded at AM-Pro Studios, London
- Remixed by Gus Dudgeon]
