= The Catch (British duo) =

English new wave duo

- Origin: England
- Genres: New wave
- Years active: 1980s
- Labels: Metronome, Stiff, Carrere
- Past members: Chris Whitten; Don Snow

The Catch were an English new wave duo active in the 1980s whose members were Don Snow and Chris Whitten. They released two albums and several singles on the Metronome label and had chart success in Europe, most notably with the single "25 Years".

== History ==
Before the Catch, Snow was a member of the Sinceros and then Squeeze. After his stint with Squeeze in 1982 on the album Sweets from a Stranger, Snow teamed up with Whitten to form the duo The Catch, releasing the debut single "25 Years" in 1983.

The group was most successful in Germany, where "25 Years" peaked at No. 3 in its first release, and it was later remixed and re-released there in 1991 and 1996 on the German labels Hansa and Ultraphonic, respectively. Two compilation albums were also released on Hansa and Repertoire Records.

== After the Catch ==
Chris Whitten has recorded and played drums as a session musician for many bands and artists during his career including Paul McCartney, Dire Straits, Tom Jones, Johnny Cash, the Pretenders, Swing Out Sister, Edie Brickell & New Bohemians, Julian Cope, ABC, the The, the Waterboys and Fredericks Goldman Jones.

Don Snow, now known as Jonn Savannah, is a multi-instrumentalist and has also played for many bands and artists including Lene Lovich, Procol Harum, Van Morrison, Tina Turner, the Vibrators, the Quick, Judie Tzuke, Tracey Ullman, Nik Kershaw, ABC, Sheila Walsh, Holly Johnson, Right Said Fred, Ray Charles, Gary Moore and Joe Cocker. Snow rejoined Squeeze on two temporary occasions in the 1990s.

== Discography ==
=== Albums ===
- Balance on Wires (1984), Metronome
- Walk the Water (1986), Metronome

=== Compilations ===
- 25 Years - The Album (1991), Hansa (credited as The Catch featuring Don Snow)
- 25 Years: The Best of Singles and 12 Inch Versions (2014), Repertoire

=== Singles ===
- "25 Years" (1983) - GER #3, AUSTRIA #6, SWI #8
- "Under the Skin" (1984) - GER #53
- "On the Road Again" (1984) - GER #53
- "Find the Love" (1985)
- "Soul Information" (1986)
- "The Difference" (1986)
- "25 Years (The 1991 Version)" (1991)
- "A Man's Gotta Do (What a Man's Gotta Do)" (1992)
- "25 Years (Version '96)" (1996)
