= Eurogliders =

Australian band

- Eurogliders c. 1982

Background information
- Origin: Perth, Western Australia, Australia
- Genres: Pop; post-punk; new wave
- Years active: 1980–1989; 2005–2007; 2013–present
- Labels: CBS; Mercury; Polygram; Universal; MGM; Sony; Columbia; Deluxe
- Past members: Bernie Lynch; Amanda Vincent; Crispin Akerman; Don Meharry; Guy Slingerland; Grace Knight; John Bennetts; Geoff Rosenberg; Ron François; Scott Saunders; Rex Goh; Lindsay Jehan; Guy Le Claire; Joy Smithers; Steve Sowerby; Phil Whitcher

Eurogliders are an Australian band formed in 1980 in Perth, Western Australia, which has included Grace Knight on vocals, Bernie Lynch on guitar and vocals and Amanda Vincent on keyboards. In 1984, Eurogliders released an Australian top ten album, This Island, which spawned their No. 2 hit single, "Heaven (Must Be There)". "Heaven" also peaked at No. 21 on the United States Billboard Mainstream Rock charts and appeared on the Hot 100. Another Australian top ten album, Absolutely, followed in 1985, which provided two further local top ten singles, "We Will Together" and "Can't Wait to See You". They disbanded in 1989, with Knight having a successful career as a jazz singer. Australian rock music historian Ian McFarlane described Eurogliders as "the accessible face of post-punk new wave music. The band's sophisticated brand of pop was traditional in its structure, but displayed the decidedly 'modern veneer' (hip clothes, heavy use of synthesiser)". The band reformed in 2005 releasing two new studio albums followed in 2014 by their seventh studio album.

== History ==
=== Early days (1980–1982) ===
Guitarist and singer Bernie Lynch (as Rip Torn) fronted a new wave band, the Stockings, in Perth, Western Australia, in the late 1970s. He left in early 1980 to form Living Single with keyboardist Amanda Vincent. Together, they recruited Crispin Akerman on guitar, Don Meharry on bass guitar and Guy Slingerland on drums through a series of advertisements. The following year, Grace Knight – Lynch's future domestic partner – joined as lead vocalist. By the end of 1981, drummer John Bennetts replaced Slingerland and the band changed their name to Eurogliders. They were signed by manager Brian Peacock to their first recording and publishing contracts with PolyGram. They recruited Melbourne bassist Geoff Rosenberg to replace Meharry. In 1982, Eurogliders travelled to Manila, capital of the Philippines, to record their debut studio album, Pink Suit Blue Day, produced by Englishman Lem Lubin, which did not peak into the top 50 of the Australian Kent Music Report albums chart. From Manila, they relocated to Sydney to release their first single in June, "Without You", which peaked into the top 40 on the Kent Music Report singles chart.

=== International success (1983–1985) ===
Eurogliders changed record labels from Polygram to CBS in 1983. They replaced bassist Rosenberg with Scott Saunders and travelled to the UK in July. While there, they recruited bassist Ron François, formerly of the Sinceros, the Teardrop Explodes and Lene Lovich. With this line-up they recorded This Island, produced by Nigel Gray (also worked with the Police), which was released in May and peaked at No. 4 on the Australian albums chart. The single "Heaven (Must Be There)", also released in May, reached No. 2 on the Australian singles charts. Released several months later in North America, the single peaked at No. 47 in Canada and at No. 65 on the US Billboard Hot 100 chart. The album peaked at No. 140 on the Billboard 200 chart. In Australia, "Heaven" was followed by a domino effect of two more top 10 hits, with "We Will Together" (No. 7, April 1985) and "Can't Wait to See You" (No. 8, November 1985). Their third studio album, Absolutely, which peaked at No. 7, spent 47 weeks in the Australian charts. From 1984 to 1986, Eurogliders toured Australia, the US, Canada, Puerto Rico, Japan and New Zealand.

At the height of the band's success, Grace Knight and Bernie Lynch reconciled their relationship and were married in 1985, but the union was short-lived. Despite their marital separation, they stayed together in the band for another four years. Lynch and Knight dismissed Brian Peacock and took over the band's management.

=== Demise (1986–1989) ===
In early 1987, journalists documented Lynch and Knight's claim that Bennetts, François and Vincent had left the band voluntarily. Vincent went to London on a world tour with the Thompson Twins and stayed in the UK to tour and co-write with Boy George. François became a session musician in Australia, while Bennetts toured with Eartha Kitt and later worked in the educational IT industry before founding Monkeydrum Studios.

Reduced to a duo, Lynch and Knight recorded their fourth studio album, Groove, with session musicians including Crispin Akerman. However, despite Akerman's presence on the album, it was clear that Lynch and Knight by themselves were now the Eurogliders as they were the only people pictured on the album cover, inner sleeve and all of the album's associated singles.

Groove peaked at No. 25 on the Australian charts in April 1988. The related single, "Groove", had peaked at No. 13 in February but the next singles, "It Must Be Love" (June 1988), "Listen" (September 1988) and "Precious" (March 1989) did not reach the top 50.

For the album tour, Lynch, Knight and Akerman were joined by Guy Le Claire on guitar, Rex Goh on guitar (ex-Air Supply), Lindsay Jehan on bass guitar and Steve Sowerby on drums. Later in 1989, the Eurogliders disbanded. Akerman returned to his visual art background and became a painter. Lynch initially pursued a solo music career and while Knight became a successful jazz singer.

=== Post-Eurogliders (1990–2005) ===
After Eurogliders, Knight made a cameo appearance in the 1990 television miniseries Come In Spinner and sang on its soundtrack album, recorded with jazz artist Vince Jones, which peaked at No. 4 on the Australian Recording Industry Association (ARIA) albums chart. This launched a new career for Knight as a jazz singer with her debut solo studio album, Stormy Weather, which peaked at No. 16 in 1991. Lynch became involved in theatre and soundtrack composition and as the business manager of his second wife, the fashion designer Collette Dinnigan. Vincent, who had a successful popular music career with credits including Boy George, Gang of Four and Billy Bragg, moved into ethnomusicology, specialising in African and Cuban music.

=== Re-formations ===
Eurogliders reformed in October 2005, with Grace Knight and Bernie Lynch using session musicians including former member Rex Goh. They released their fifth studio album, simply called Eurogliders, which included the single "Hummingbird". Neither the album or single peaked into the ARIA top 50 charts. They started touring again in April 2006 and performed on the Countdown Spectacular concerts during June to August. The concerts were a nostalgic tour of Australian popular music groups and artists from the 1970s and 1980s as featured on the pop music television show Countdown with its host, Molly Meldrum. The group's sixth studio album, Blue Kiss, was recorded during the same sessions as the previous album and was released in mid-2006. It also had no top 50 charting. The Eurogliders' official website was shut down in September 2008. In 2013 it was announced that the group were expected to reform to support the Boomtown Rats on a planned reunion tour of Australia in May. However, the tour was cancelled due to poor ticket sales. Their seventh studio album, Don't Eat the Daisies, appeared in 2014. In May 2017 they headlined the entertainment on Darley Kingsford-Smith Cup Day during the Brisbane Winter Racing Carnival. Eurogliders planned to tour Australia in support of Simple Minds and Orchestral Manoeuvres in the Dark (OMD) in December 2021.

Bernie Lynch died from throat cancer, aged 72, on 12 March 2026.

== Members ==
Eurogliders' members (arranged chronologically):

- Bernie Lynch – vocals, guitar, keyboards (1980–1989, 2005–2007, 2013–2026; died 2026)
- Amanda Vincent – keyboards (1980–1987)
- Crispin Akerman – guitar (1980–1987)
- Don Meharry – bass guitar (1980–1981)
- Guy Slingerland – drums (1980–1981)
- Grace Knight – vocals, saxophone, keyboards (1981–1989, 2005–2007, 2013–present)
- John Bennetts – drums, percussion (1981–1987)
- Stephen Clarke - drums (1981)
- Geoff Rosenberg – bass guitar (1981–1983)
- Ron François – bass guitar, backing vocals (1983–1987)
- Scott Saunders – bass (1983)
- Rex Goh – guitar (1988–1989)
- Lindsay Jehan – bass guitar (1988–1989)
- Guy Le Claire – guitar (1988–1989)
- Joy Smithers – backing vocals (1988–1989)
- Steve Sowerby – drums (1988–1989)
- Phil Whitcher – Keyboards (1988–1989)

== Discography ==
=== Studio albums ===
Title	Album details	Peak chart positions	Certifications (sales thresholds)
Title	Album details	AUS	Certifications (sales thresholds)
Pink Suit Blue Day	Released: June 1982; Label: Mercury Records (6437 154); Format: LP	54	
This Island	Released: May 1984; Label: CBS Records (SBP 237994); Format: LP	4	AUS: Platinum
Absolutely	Released: October 1985; Label: CBS Records (SBP 8106); Format: LP	7	AUS: Platinum
Groove	Released: March 1988; Label: CBS Records (460864 1); Format: LP	25	
Eurogliders	Released: 2005; Label: Cheeky Joe Records Australia (CJR 001); Format: CD	—	
Don't Eat The Daisies	Released: 2014; Label: MGM Distribution (GKM002); Format: CD, DD	—	
The Blue Kiss Project	Released: 2021; Label: Grace Knight (GKM005); Format: CD, DD	—	

=== Compilation albums ===
Title	Album details	Peak chart positions
Title	Album details	AUS
12" Mixes	Released: 1985; Label: CBS Records (450493-4); Format: LP	—
Greatest Hits: Maybe Only I Dream	Released: September 1992; Label: Columbia Records (468288 2); Format: CD, Cassette	134
The Essential Eurogliders	Released: 9 April 2007; Label: Sony BMG (88697069622); Format: CD, DD	—

=== Singles ===
Year	Title	Peak chart positions					Album
Year	Title	AUS	CAN	NZL	US Hot 100	US Main	Album
1982	"Without You"	34	—	—	—	—	Pink Suit Blue Day
1982	"Laughing Matter"	—	—	—	—	—	Pink Suit Blue Day
1983	"No Action"	97	—	—	—	—	This Island
1983	"Another Day in the Big World"	66	—	—	—	—	This Island
1984	"Heaven (Must Be There)"	2	47	6	65	21	This Island
1984	"Maybe Only I Dream"	56	—	—	—	—	This Island
1985	"We Will Together"	7	—	—	—	—	Absolutely
1985	"The City of Soul"	19	—	—	—	—	Absolutely
1985	"Can't Wait to See You"	8	—	—	—	—	Absolutely
1986	"Absolutely"	29	—	—	—	—	Absolutely
1986	"So Tough"	91	—	—	—	—	Absolutely
1988	"Groove"	13	—	—	—	—	Groove
1988	"It Must Be Love"	72	—	—	—	—	Groove
1988	"Listen"	—	—	—	—	—	Groove
1989	"Precious"	—	—	—	—	—	Groove
2005	"Hummingbird"	—	—	—	—	—	Eurogliders
"—" denotes a recording that did not chart or was not released in that territory.

== Awards and nominations ==
=== ARIA Music Awards ===
The ARIA Music Awards are a set of annual ceremonies presented by Australian Recording Industry Association (ARIA), which recognise excellence, innovation, and achievement across all genres of the music of Australia. They commenced in 1987.

Year	Nominee / work	Award	Result	Ref.
2024	Eurogliders - realestate.com.au: Keep Moving (72andSunny)	Best Use of an Australian Recording in an Advertisement	Nominated	

=== Countdown Australian Music Awards ===
Countdown was an Australian pop music TV series on national broadcaster ABC-TV from 1974–1987, it presented music awards from 1979–1987, initially in conjunction with magazine TV Week. The TV Week / Countdown Awards were a combination of popular-voted and peer-voted awards.

Year	Nominee / work	Award	Result
1982	"Pink Suit Blue Day"	Best Debut Album	Nominated
1982	"Without You"	Best Debut Single	Nominated
1984	"Heaven (Must Be There)"	Best Single	Won
1984	"Heaven (Must Be There)"	Best Video	Nominated
1984	Themselves in "Heaven (Must Be There)"	Best Group Performance in a Video	Nominated
1984	Bernie Lynch (Eurogliders)	Best Songwriter	Nominated
1984	Grace Knight	Most Popular Female Performer	Nominated
1986	Grace Knight	Most Popular Female Performer	Nominated

=== West Australian Music Industry Awards ===
The West Australian Music Industry Awards are annual awards celebrating achievements for Western Australian music. They commenced in 1985.

Year	Nominee / work	Award	Result
2017	Eurogliders	Hall of Fame	inductee
