= Sleight of hand (disambiguation) =

Sleight of hand is a magic technique.

Sleight of Hand may also refer to:

- Sleight of Hand (album), by Joan Armatrading
- "Sleight of Hand", song by The Sinceros Pet Rock
- "Sleight of Hand!, song by Pearl Jam Binaural
- "Sleight of Hand", song by Parkway Drive from Atlas
- "Sleight of Hand" (Doctors), a 2005 television episode
- "Sleight of Hand", episode from Prison Break (season 1)
