= Mark Kjeldsen =

- Born: Mark Christian Moesgaard Kjeldsen; 1953; Kent, England
- Died: 1992 (aged 38–39)
- Occupation(s): Musician singer songwriter
- Instrument(s): Guitar vocals

Mark Kjeldsen (1953 in Kent, England – 1992) was a founder member of The Sinceros (1978–1981), who wrote most of the songs on their two albums, including their minor hit single "Take Me To Your Leader." He had been a member of the London R&B band, The Strutters. After the demise of The Sinceros, Kjeldsen (pronounced Kelsen) performed with the Danny Adler Band (ex-Roogalator), a live album featuring Kjeldsen on rhythm guitar was recorded at the Winterthur – Switzerland on 10 August 1982 and released in 1983. In the late 1980s, Kjeldsen gave up music to become a social worker and died from AIDS in 1992.

His musical career started after leaving Tonbridge School when he formed folk duo Friendso'mine with fellow musician Hugh Trethowan. Together they toured the folk clubs of Kent and London culminating in an album of their own material for Westwood Recordings in 1972.
