= Rex Goh =

Australian musician

- Born: Goh Tee Huat; 5 May 1951 (age 75); Singapore
- Genre: Rock
- Occupations: Musician, songwriter, producer
- Instrument: Guitar
- Years active: Since 1971
- Website: rexgoh.com

Goh Tee Huat, known professionally as Rex Goh, (born 5 May 1951) is a Singaporean-born Australian rock guitarist. In 1972 Goh moved to Australia. He has been a band member of various groups including Air Supply (1977, 1981–1983), QED (1983–1985), and Eurogliders (1988–1989, 2005).

Goh has also toured and recorded as a session guitarist with Savage Garden, Randy Crawford, Tom Jones, Guy Sebastian and Daryl Braithwaite. As a producer Goh has worked on albums for Tania Bowra, The Robertson Brothers and Rene Diaz.

== Biography ==
Rex Goh was born as Goh Tee Huat on 5 May 1951 in Singapore and grew up in Aljunied and Toa Payoh. Before emigrating to Australia, he attended Saint Andrew's School At ten he learned the ukulele with guidance from a neighbouring musician, Benny Chan, who was a guitarist for a local group, The Checkmates. After three or four years he started on guitar, and was inspired by early 1960s bands, The Shadows and The Ventures, and then by Eric Clapton, Jimi Hendrix and Terry Kath. He joined Tani's Titans on bass guitar; the band appeared on a children's TV show, performing country music. After finishing secondary school he was a member of Group 123, initially on bass guitar, but soon switching to lead guitar. He acquired his 1969 Gibson Les Paul guitar; the group performed at British RAF bases.

He relocated to Australia in 1972, initially living in Adelaide where he played in a covers band, playing Yes material. Subsequently, he relocated to Melbourne, and by 1976 he had moved to Sydney. Goh, on guitar, was a member of Leon Berger Band before joining Air Supply early in 1977. Other members of Air Supply were Russell Hitchcock on vocals and percussion; Nigel Macara on drums; Jeremy Paul on bass guitar; Graham Russell on vocals and guitar; and Adrian Scott on keyboards. Together this line-up recorded the band's second album, The Whole Thing's Started (July 1977). He toured with the group later that year as they supported Rod Stewart both in Australia and North America. By early 1978 Goh was replaced by Ken Francis on guitar. In the late 1970s, Air Supply relocated to the United States; however, Goh chose to remain in Australia.

In 1980 Goh completed a Diploma of Jazz Studies course at Sydney Conservatorium of Music. He returned to Air Supply by early 1981 and with Russell he co-wrote three tracks, "I Want to Give It All" (B-side of "The One That You Love", July 1981), "She Never Heard Me Call" and "What Kind of Girl" (B-side of Australian single, "I'm Late Again", October 1982). He also provided electric and rhythm guitar for their sixth studio album The One That You Love (August 1981) and its follow up Now and Forever (July 1982). By the end of the next year he had left Air Supply to form QED.

QED were a New Wave group with Jenny Morris (ex-The Crocodiles) on lead vocals; Ian Belton (ex-Dave Dobbyn, Renée Geyer) on bass guitar; and Shane Flew on drums. Goh and Morris co-wrote tracks for the group but their biggest hit was a cover version of The Crocodiles' "Everywhere I Go" (December 1983), which peaked in the top 20 of the Australian Kent Music Report. QED issued further singles, including "This One" (August 1984) – co-written by Goh and Morris – and a lone album, Animal Magic (November 1984), on EMI Records. They disbanded in 1985 with Morris starting her solo career.

For the next few years Goh worked in various bands or as a session musician, and wrote radio and TV jingles. During 1984 Goh and Tommy Emmanuel provided guitars for Zero Zero, a musical film, by Mike Batt (The Wombles), which featured the Sydney Symphony Orchestra and was created for the 50th anniversary of the Australian Broadcasting Corporation (ABC, which was founded as Australian Broadcasting Commission). According to The Canberra Times it was "a surrealistic video musical for symphony orchestra, rock group, synthesiser and voice", when shown in April on ABC-TV. For the Australian stage version of Alan Bleasdale's musical play, Are You Lonesome Tonight?, Goh provided guitar in August 1986 at Her Majesty's Theatre. In May 1987 Goh was a guitarist for a rock group, The Inevitables, with Armando Hurley on lead vocals; David Jones on drums; and Sam McNally on keyboards.

By 1988 he had joined pop group Eurogliders, alongside Crispin Akerman on guitar; Bernie Lynch on lead guitar and vocals; Grace Knight on lead vocals; Guy Le Claire on guitar; Lindsay Jehan on bass guitar; and Steve Sowerby on drums. As a member of Eurogliders, Goh provided guitar for their fourth album, Groove (April 1988). Late in the following year they disbanded. Goh and Lynch co-produced the debut album, Heaven and Earth (1989), by singer-songwriter Tania Bowra. Goh also provided guitar and toured in her backing band in support of the album. In the following year he was a session musician for Ana Christensen's solo album, Brave New World, which was produced by Garth Porter (ex-Sherbet). Her material "ranged from Celtic ballads and country-tinged pop to laid-back rock".

During the early 1990s he was a member of Duff and Rhodes led by Jeff Duff and Glenn Rhodes, both on lead vocals, with Greg Henson on drums; Col Loughnan on saxophone and flute (ex-Ayers Rock); and Helen Lutz on violin. In 1993 Goh joined Brian Cadd and Glenn Shorrock (both ex-Axiom) in The Blazing Salads, which issued a self-titled album that year. The other band members were Kirk Lorange on guitar (ex-Richard Clapton Band) and Mark Kennedy on drums (Spectrum, Ayers Rock, Marcia Hines Band). From 1995 Goh was a guitarist in the Phil and Tommy Emmanuel Band, which formed to support the release of the brothers' album Terra Firma. He toured with Tommy's band "for about three years when [Tommy] played mostly electric".

By June 2000 Goh had worked on two albums with Paul Kneipp: they co-produced Everywhere by vocal duo, Tanis and Mandi, while Goh also provided guitar; and Kneipp produced Rich Man by vocal trio, The Robertson Brothers, again with Goh on guitar. Ellie Greenwich-written songs were presented in an Australian rendition of the musical, Leader of the Pack, in June 2003 with Goh providing guitar for the stage band at Sydney's Star City Showroom. In 2005 Eurogliders reconvened with Lynch and Knight using Goh and session musicians to record new material as Eurogliders (2005) and Blue Kiss (2007)

In October 2009 Goh led the house band on guitars for Joni: A Tribute to the Legendary Joni Mitchell. Vocalists were Katie Noonan, Wendy Matthews, Kristin Berardi, Tania Bowra, Louise Perryman, Virna Sanzone and Rachel Gaudry. As a session musician for touring, recording or TV appearances Goh has also worked for Savage Garden (1997's self-titled album), Randy Crawford and Tom Jones (as part of The Midday Show house band for Crawford and Jones' duet), Guy Sebastian (and other Australian Idol contestants as a member of the TV show's house band from 2003 to 2009) and Daryl Braithwaite.

He now plays in Marlene Cummins's band.

== Discography ==
According to AllMusic, Rex Goh is credited with: guitars (electric, acoustic, rhythm, nylon string, classical, slide), and arranger.

with Air Supply

- The Whole Thing's Started (July 1977)
- The One That You Love (August 1981)
- Now and Forever (July 1982)

with Mike Batt

- Zero Zero (1984)

with QED

- Animal Magic (November 1984)

with Eurogliders

- Groove (April 1988)
- Eurogliders (2005)

with Marlene Cummins

- Koori Woman Blues (2014)

as session musician

- Heaven and Earth (1989) by Tania Bowra
- Brave New World (1990) by Ana Christensen
- Hot Night (1992) by Jon Mark
- The Blazing Salads (1993) by The Blazing Salads (aka Brian Cadd and Glenn Shorrock)
- I Know Why (1993) by The Robertson Brothers
- Terra Firma (1995) by Phil and Tommy Emmanuel
- Night Music (1996) by Mark-Almond
- Taking the Wheel (1997) by David Campbell
- Savage Garden (1997) by Savage Garden
- Future Road (November 1997) by The Seekers
- Everwhere (2000) by Tanis and Mandi
- Rich Man (2000) by The Robertson Brothers
- No One Does It Better (22 August 2000) by soulDecision
- Doin' Our Thing (2001) by The Sydney All Star Big Band
- Live: Hot Potatoes (2005) by The Wiggles
- Homestead of My Dreams (2005) by Smoky Dawson
- Feel This Free (11 April 2005) by Beccy Cole
- Young Divas (14 November 2006) by Young Divas
- A New Chapter (26 November 2006) by Anthony Callea
- Who I Am (November 2007) by Amy Pearson
- The Winner's Journey (8 December 2007) by Natalie Gauci
- Classic Rewinds (2008) by Alfio
- The Way the World Looks (20 March 2009) by Wes Carr
- The Stillest Hour (24 April 2009) by Carl Riseley
- Sweeter Side (16 July 2010) by Erika Heynatz
