= Groove (Eurogliders album) =

Studio album by Eurogliders
- Released: March 18, 1988
- Recorded: 1987
- Genre: Indie pop; rock
- Label: Columbia
- Producer: Bernie Lynch; David Price

Eurogliders chronology
Absolutely (1985)	Groove (1988)	Eurogliders (2005)

Singles from Groove
- 1. "Groove" Released: February 1988; 2. "It Must Be Love" Released: 30 May 1988; 3. "Listen" Released: September 1988; 4. "Precious" Released: March 1989

Groove is the fourth studio album by Australian Indie pop, rock band Eurogliders, released in March 1988.

In early 1987, three long-term members, John Bennetts, Ron Francois and Amanda Vincent, left the band. Reduced to a duo, Bernie Lynch and Grace Knight recorded their fourth album (Groove) with session musicians, including long-time Eurogliders guitarist Crispin Akerman. Despite Akerman's presence on the album it was clear that Lynch and Knight by themselves were now the Eurogliders, as they were the only people pictured on the album cover or inner sleeve, or on any of the album's associated singles.

Groove peaked at No. 25 on the Australian charts in April 1988. The related single, "Groove" had peaked at No. 13 in February but the next singles, "It Must Be Love" in May, "Listen" in September and "Precious" in March 1989 did not reach the top 50.

For the album tour, Lynch, Knight and Akerman were joined by Guy Le Claire on guitar, Rex Goh on guitar (ex-Air Supply), Lindsay Jehan on bass guitar and Steve Sowerby on drums. Later in 1989, the Eurogliders disbanded.

== Track listing ==
All tracks are written by Bernie Lynch

Groove
No.	Title	Length
1.	"Listen"	3:49
2.	"It Must Be Love"	3:53
3.	"What's the Point"	4:41
4.	"Dreaming"	4:31
5.	"Lights Go Red"	4:18
6.	"Groove"	4:20
7.	"Precious"	5:29
8.	"Underground"	3:52
9.	"Walk on Water"	5:52
10.	"Groove (Extended Mix)"	6:15

== Charts ==
Chart (1988)	Peak position
Australia Kent Music Report Album Chart	25

== Personnel ==
Eurogliders

- Grace Knight — vocals, keyboards
- Bernie Lynch — vocals, guitar, keyboards

Additional musicians

- Crispin Akerman — guitar
- Ian Belton — bass guitar
- Peter Bondy — bass synth on "Listen"
- Craig Calhoun — bass guitar
- Andy Cichon — bass guitar
- Stuart Fraser — guitar
- Jacky — vocals
- Joy Smithers — backing vocals
- The Sween — drums, drum programming
- Steve Sowerby — percussion
- Phil Whitcher — keyboards, Hammond organ
