= QED (band) =

Australian band

- Origin: Sydney, New South Wales, Australia
- Genres: New wave
- Years active: 1983–1985
- Label: EMI Australia
- Spinoff of: The Crocodiles
- Past members: Ian Belton; Rex Goh; Jenny Morris; Shane Flew

QED were an Australian new wave band who had a top twenty hit single, "Everywhere I Go", on the Australian Kent Music Report in 1984. The band's lead singer, Jenny Morris, later went on to achieve commercial success as a solo artist.

== History ==
In February 1981, the New Zealand band the Crocodiles relocated to Sydney and soon disbanded. In late 1983, the Crocodiles' lead vocalist, Jenny Morris, formed QED in Sydney with guitarist Rex Goh (ex-Air Supply), bassist Ian Belton (ex-Dave Dobbyn, Renée Geyer), and drummer Shane Flew. The trio signed with EMI Australia and were produced by Mark Moffatt (the Saints, Mondo Rock, Tim Finn) and Ricky Fataar (Geyer, Finn, Kids in the Kitchen). QED recorded some of the Crocodiles' material including "Everywhere I Go", "Animal Magic" and "You're So Hip"; Morris also co-wrote new songs with Goh.

Their debut single, "Everywhere I Go", was released in December 1983 and rose to No. 24 on the national chart in February 1984. After QED performed the song on Countdown on 1 April 1984, the single climbed back up the chart to peak at No. 19. In total, "Everywhere I Go" spent 16 weeks in the Australian top 50 and was the 100th biggest-selling single of 1984. The follow-up single "Solo and More" was issued in March but was unsuccessful. The third single, "This One", appeared in August and reached No. 45 on the national singles chart.

Additional musicians for QED's first album, Animal Magic, included keyboardist Amanda Vincent (Eurogliders, who later joined the Jenny Morris band), drummer Steve Fearnly, saxophonist Tony Buchanan, and Fataar on drums. EMI released the album in November 1984, but sales were low and it failed to chart. QED only released one album and disbanded by 1985. Morris continued session/touring work with other artists, Belton went on to join Mondo Rock, and Goh to Eurogliders. Morris later had a successful solo career.

== Members ==
- Ian Belton – bass guitar
- Rex Goh – guitar
- Jenny Morris – vocals
- Shane Flew – drums

=== Additional personnel ===
- Tony Buchanan – saxophone
- Andy Burns – keyboards
- Ricky Fataar – drums
- Steve Fearnly – drums
- Shane Flew – guitar
- Martyn Irwin – keyboards
- Sam McNally – keyboards
- Glen Muirhead – keyboards
- Amanda Vincent – keyboards
- Warren Williams – bass

== Discography ==
=== Albums ===
Title	Album details
Animal Magic	Released: November 1984; Label: EMI Music (EMX-430021)

=== Singles ===
Year	Title	AUS	Label
Dec 1983	"Everywhere I Go"/"Checkmate"	19	EMI (EMI 1119)
Mar 1984	"Solo and More"/"I'll Get it Right"	–	EMI (EMI 1372)
Aug 1984	"This One"/"Hush Hush Sweet Charlotte"	45	EMI (EMI 1288)

== Awards and nominations ==
=== Countdown Music Awards ===
Countdown was an Australian pop music TV series on national broadcaster ABC-TV from 1974 to 1987, it presented music awards from 1979 to 1987, initially in conjunction with magazine TV Week. The TV Week / Countdown Awards were a combination of popular-voted and peer-voted awards.

Year	Nominee / work	Award	Result
1984	Animal Magic	Best Debut Album	Nominated
