= Roogalator =

Pub rock band (1972–1978)

- Origin: London, England
- Genres: Pub rock; funk; new wave
- Years active: 1972–1978
- Labels: Stiff; Virgin; Do It; Proper
- Past members: Danny Adler; Julian Scott; Nick Monnas; Bobby Irwin; Paul Riley; Jeff Watts; Malcolm Mortimer; Dave Solomon; Nick Plytas; Steve Beresford; Justin Hildreth

Roogalator was a pub rock band formed in London in 1972, by the US-born guitarist Danny Adler.

Earlier that year, Adler recorded demos with 10cc's Graham Gouldman at Strawberry Studios. Prior to Roogalator, Adler had also played with Smooth Loser, a band formed with Jeff Pasternak, the brother of BBC disc-jockey Emperor Rosko. Bass guitarist Tony Lester, guitarist Chris Gibbons and drummer Malcolm Mortimer (G.T. Moore and the Reggae Guitars), were members for a time. Mortimer returned to Adler for an early incarnation of Roogalator before leaving to join Ian Dury in Kilburn and the High Roads.

== History ==
Roogalator played their first live show in November 1972, at a talent night staged at the Marquee Club in London to muted response. Adler, killing time between the Irish Country and Western circuit and jam sessions with Ginger Baker's African drummers, spent time in Paris studying jazz theory. He returned to London to form the second line-up of Roogalator with drummer Bobby Irwin, pianist Steve Beresford and keyboardist Nick Plytas, both of whom went on to play on numerous On-U Sound Records roots reggae and dub albums, including releases by Singers & Players and African Head Charge. Nick Plytas also went on to play on Pal Judy, an album by Judy Nylon.

The band recorded a demo which resulted in a booking agency deal. Neither Beresford nor Irwin wanted to proceed. With their first live shows ahead, Adler and Plytas rebuilt the line-up. Drummer Dave Solomon, a bandmate of both Plytas and Beresford in a Motown cover band, replaced Irwin. Irwin, noting the band was still minus a bassist, gave a copy of the demo to Paul Riley, a member of the successful pub-scene band Chilli Willi and the Red Hot Peppers. Riley joined Roogalator just before their September 1975 debut, and for a time it was his fame that attracted the band's first press notices.

They became one of the fixtures on the mid-1970s London pub rock scene, establishing themselves as unique on the pub circuit. Drawing from Adler's experience on the Cincinnati club circuit of the late 1960s, Roogalator offered an angular, minimalist funk sound which was at odds with the standard country, blues, and early rock sounds and created a distinctive blueprint for what would become the Britfunk explosion of the early 1980s.

In November 1975, the band recorded demos for United Artists Records and met Robin Scott, who would become their manager, producer and record label chief. In January 1976 they supported Dr. Feelgood at the Hammersmith Odeon in London. The show was by their own consensus a disaster and marked the end of the classic line-up. Within weeks, Solomon quit, to be replaced by the returning Bobby Irwin. Riley also departed. Adding bassist Jeff Watts, Roogalator recorded a John Peel session on 13 May 1976 and embarked on a European tour. The tour was marred by the theft of all their possessions from their van. Watts and Irwin departed to reunite with Riley in the Sinceros, which he was now managing.

Encouraged by Scott, Adler recruited a new rhythm section; bass guitarist Julian Scott (brother of Robin) and drummer Justin Hildreth. In early summer 1976, Roogalator signed a one-off single deal with Stiff Records and released "All Aboard"/"Cincinnati Fatback". The band continued gigging returning to the BBC for a second Peel session on 28 October 1976.

In 1977, the band released another one-off single, "Love And The Single Girl", on Virgin Records. They declined a recording contract with Virgin, who had insisted that they also sign a publishing contract in addition to a recording contract. The band returned to the BBC for a third and final session with Peel on 16 August 1977.

The band released their debut album, Play It by Ear, in 1977 on manager's Scott's Do It Records label, essentially an opportunity to preserve the band's repertoire on vinyl. The album was well-received but sold poorly.

The band played at ‘Front Row Festival’, a three-week event at the Hope and Anchor, Islington, in late November and early December 1977. This resulted in the band's inclusion, alongside Wilko Johnson, the Only Ones, proto punk band the Saints, the Stranglers, X-Ray Spex, and XTC, on a hit double album of recordings from the festival. The Hope & Anchor Front Row Festival compilation LP (March 1978) reached number 28 in the UK Albums Chart.

When Plytas left, the band opted not to replace him and continued to gig as a trio, releasing in 1978, one more single, "Zero Hero" and demoing a second album. Hildreth was next to quit to be replaced by Nick Monnas (from Stomu Yamashta band).

Adler, discouraged by the constant changes in the line-up and with feelings that the band had run its course, disbanded Roogalator in July 1978, with many of the songs intended for their second album being reworked for his solo debut, The Danny Adler Story. Roogalator's repertoire was later re-issued on the Cincinnati Fatback compilation album.

== Discography ==
=== Albums ===
LP - Play It by Ear (Do It Records - 1977)
CD - Cincinnati Fatback (Compilation) (Proper Records - 1999)

=== Singles ===
7" - "All Aboard" b/w "Cincinnati Fatback" (Stiff Records, 1976)
7" - "Love and the Single Girl" b/w "I Feel Good (I Got You)" (Virgin Records, 1977)
7" - "Zero Hero" b/w "Sweet Mama Kundalini" (Do It Records, 1978)
