= This Island =

This Island may refer to:

- This Island (Le Tigre album), 2004, and its title track
- This Island (Eurogliders album), 1984
