= Pink Suit Blue Day =

Studio album by Eurogliders
- Released: June 7, 1982
- Recorded: October 1981−February 1982
- Genre: Indie pop; new wave
- Label: Mercury; Polygram
- Producer: Lem Lubin

Eurogliders chronology
Pink Suit Blue Day (1982)	This Island (1984)

Singles from Pink Suit Blue Day
- 1. "Without You" Released: June 1982; 2. "Laughing Matter" Released: September 1982

Pink Suit Blue Day is the debut studio album by Australian rock band Eurogliders, released in 1982. Their debut single, "Without You", was released in June and entered the top 40 of the Australian Kent Music Report singles chart. A follow-up single, "Laughing Matter" in September did not chart.

At the 1982 Countdown Music Awards, the album was nominated for Best Debut Album.

== Background ==
Guitarist and singer, Bernie Lynch fronted (as Rip Torn) a new wave band, The Stockings, in Perth, Western Australia in the late 1970s. He left in early 1980 to form Living Single with Crispin Akerman on guitar, Don Meharry on bass guitar, Guy Slingerland on drums and Amanda Vincent on keyboards. Lynch's domestic partner, UK-born vocalist, Grace Knight joined the group soon afterwards. By the end of 1981, drummer John Bennetts replaced Slingerland and the band changed their name to Eurogliders. They were signed by manager, Brian Peacock, to their first recording and publishing contracts with Polygram. They then recruited Melbourne bass player Geoff Rosenberg to replace Meharry.

In late 1981, Eurogliders traveled to the Philippines capital Manila, to record their first album, Pink Suit Blue Day, produced by Englishman Lem Lubin. It did not enter the top 50 of the Australian Kent Music Report albums chart. They released their first single, "Without You", in June which entered the top 40 on the Kent Music Report singles chart. A follow-up single, "Laughing Matter" in September did not chart into the top 50.

== Track listing ==
All tracks are written by Bernie Lynch

Pink Suit Blue Day
No.	Title	Length
1.	"Jeepney Talk"	3:12
2.	"Without You"	4:06
3.	"Through Your Window"	4:16
4.	"Laughing Matter"	3:23
5.	"Darkest Hours"	4:49
6.	"Get Me Out of Here"	2:52
7.	"Touching Me"	3:23
8.	"On the Nightline"	3:16
9.	"Time"	3:24
10.	"Magneto"	2:57
11.	"Americans"	4:32

== Charts ==
Chart (1982)	Peak position
Australia Kent Music Report Album Chart	54

== Personnel ==
Eurogliders members

- Crispin Akerman – guitar
- John Bennetts – drums, percussion
- Grace Knight — vocals, saxophone, keyboards
- Bernie Lynch – vocals, guitar, keyboards
- Geoff Rosenberg – bass guitar
- Amanda Vincent – keyboards
