= The Sound of Sunbathing =

- UK cover

Studio album by The Sinceros
- Released: 1979
- Studio: Wessex, London
- Genre: New wave, power pop
- Label: Epic (UK); Columbia (US)
- Producer: Joe Wissert

The Sinceros chronology
The Sound of Sunbathing (1979)	2nd Debut (1980)

Alternative cover
- US cover

Professional ratings
Review scores
Source	Rating
Christgau's Record Guide	B−
Smash Hits	5/10
Trouser Press	Mixed

The Sound of Sunbathing is the debut album from the Sinceros, a new wave and power pop band from England. The album, with initial copies pressed on orange vinyl, was released worldwide and achieved moderate commercial success. This is the only album so far released on CD (via Cherry Red Records), the follow-up being Pet Rock. The Sunbathing CD was released on 18 May 2009 with the catalogue number CDM RED 396. One track from this album, "Take Me to Your Leader", has appeared on the compilation albums New Wave Hits of the 70's & 80's and Big Hits, Skinny Ties: New Wave in the UK.

== Track listing (UK) ==
All tracks composed by Mark Kjeldsen; except where noted.

1. "I Still Miss You"
2. "Quick Quick Slow"
3. "My Little Letter"
4. "Hanging On Too Long" (Don Snow)
5. "Worlds Apart"
6. "Take Me to Your Leader"
7. "Little White Lie"
8. "Break Her Heart"
9. "So They Know"
10. "Good Luck (To You)" (Ron François)

== Track listing (USA) ==
All tracks composed by Mark Kjeldsen; except where noted.

1. "Take Me to Your Leader"
2. "Worlds Apart"
3. "Little White Lie"
4. "So They Know"
5. "Hanging On Too Long" (Don Snow)
6. "I Still Miss You"
7. "Quick Quick Slow"
8. "My Little Letter"
9. "Break Her Heart"
10. "Good Luck (To You)" (Ron François)

== Personnel ==
The Sinceros

- Mark Kjeldsen - guitar, vocals
- Ron François - bass guitar, vocals
- Don Snow - keyboards, vocals
- Bobby Irwin - drums

== Production credits ==
- Produced by Joe Wissert
- Engineered by Bill Price
- Recorded at Wessex Studios, London

== Critical reception ==
Trouser Press praised the Sinceros for creating "two great tracks — a quirky bit of silliness called 'Take Me to Your Leader' and a Joe Jackson soundalike, 'Little White Lie'..." but expressed little enthusiasm for the album as a whole, saying that other than those two songs, "it's an amiable pop record with little character".
