= Paul Riley (musician) =

English bassist (born 1951)

- Also known as: Paul "Bassman" Riley; Paul Bass
- Born: 3 October 1951 (age 74)
- Origin: Islington, London
- Genres: Pub Rock; Blues
- Occupations: Musician; Singer; Producer
- Instruments: Bass guitar Vocals
- Years active: 1970s–present

Paul Riley (born 3 October 1951, Islington, London) is an English bassist, singer and record producer. He was a member of Chilli Willi and the Red Hot Peppers and Roogalator in the 1970s.

== Biography ==
His career in music began at the beginning of the 1970s as bass player with various visiting blues artists, notably: Albert Collins, Champion Jack Dupree, Bobby Parker, Lightnin' Slim, Homesick James – and continued through the decade with seminal pub-rockers Chilli Willi and the Red Hot Peppers, Robin Scott, the embryonic Rockpile (as featured on the album Get It), and with guitarist Danny Adler's Roogalator.

By the closing years of the 1970s, he had become involved in record production and (briefly) artist-management, co-managing and producing The Sinceros. As the 1970s moved into the 1980s he took over the running of Nick Lowe's 'AMPRO' studio, and was recording full-time – subsequently producing and/or engineering records for Lew Lewis, Carlene Carter, Elvis Costello, Nick Lowe, Johnny Marr, The Anti-Nowhere League, The Ruts, Robert Wyatt, Edwyn Collins, Squeeze, Paul Carrack, Kirsty McColl, Genny Schorr, Tony Riviera Sales and more. In 1985, he was invited to join the staff of Demon Records to add some technical understanding and help enable production of the brand-new compact-disc format, to assume responsibility for all mastering issues and to become archivist of the burgeoning tape archive (a legacy of the prodigious output of Elvis Costello, Nick Lowe and all former Riviera Global artists). Three years later, he could be found moonlighting on bass with The Tex Pistols (alongside former Chilli Willi drummer Pete Thomas ), and later, in 1992, continued moonlighting activities with The Balham Alligators, playing alongside Geraint Watkins and Bobby Irwin with whom in 1994, he would serve as a member of Nick Lowe's Impossible Birds, his last regular gig as a musician.

He left Demon in 1995, and after the dissolution of the Impossible Birds was co-opted into the business of Malcolm Mills, founder of Proper Records.
