= Come in Spinner (miniseries) =

1990 Australian TV series

- DVD cover
- Based on: Come in Spinner by Dymphna Cusack and Florence James
- Written by: Lissa Benyon; Nick Enright
- Directed by: Robert Marchand
- Starring: Lisa Harrow; Kerry Armstrong; Rebecca Gibney
- Country of origin: Australia
- Original language: English

Original release
- Network: Australian Broadcasting Corporation
- Release: 28 March 1990 – 1990

Come in Spinner is a 1990 Australian miniseries, based on the novel of the same name by Dymphna Cusack, starring Lisa Harrow, Kerry Armstrong, Rebecca Gibney, Martin Vaughan, and Sheila Kennelly.

At the 1990 Australian Film Institute Awards it received five nominations, winning three awards, Best Mini-Series or Telefeature, Best Achievement in Direction in a Mini-Series or Telefeature and Best Lead Actress in a Television Drama (Rebecca Gibney). In 1991 the miniseries won a Logie Award for Most Outstanding Drama Series.

The series was well received by critics and audiences and was replayed on the Channel 10 network in 1991. It was released on DVD in 2005. One critic called it a "wonderfully sumptuous and faithful adaptation", praising Gibney and Harrow in particular.

The soundtrack album was released featuring Grace Knight and Vince Jones. It was produced by Martin Armiger with arrangements and conducting by Derek Williams and William Motzing. The album achieved double platinum sales and won the ARIA Award for Best Adult Contemporary Album. It peaked at No 4 on the ARIA Charts, and became the highest selling jazz album in Australian history with sales exceeding 230,000 copies.

== Plot ==
The miniseries is set in the spring of 1944, in wartime Sydney. It centres on the life of three women: Claire (Harrow), Guinea (Gibney) and Deb (Armstrong), who are co-workers in the beauty salon of an exclusive Sydney hotel.

== Cast ==
- Lisa Harrow as Claire Jeffries
- Kerry Armstrong as Deb Forrest
- Rebecca Gibney as Guinea Malone
- Justine Clarke as Monnie Malone
- Martin Vaughan as Blue
- Sheila Kennelly
- Rhys McConnochie as Angus McFarland
- Zoe Bertram as Nolly
- Sonia Todd as Helen McFarland
- Rebecca Smart as Luen
- Monica Maughan as Mrs Scott
- Rebecca Rigg as Shirley Noonan
- Valerie Bader as Elvira
- Peter Whitford as Mr Sharlton
- Kerry Walker as Mrs Molesworth
- Judi Farr as Mrs Gartred
- Gillian Jones as Mrs Malone
- Gary Sweet as Jack
- David Wenham as Australian Soldier
- Arianthe Galani
- Bryan Marshall as Byron
- Susan Lyons as Dallas McIntyre
- Pat Bishop as Mrs D'Arcy Twining
