= Absolutely (Eurogliders album) =

Studio album by Eurogliders
- Released: October 11, 1985
- Recorded: December 1984−June 1985
- Studio: Maison Rouge (London, England); Rhinoceros Studios (Sydney, Australia); Studios 301 (Sydney, Australia)
- Genre: Indie pop; new wave; rock
- Label: CBS
- Producer: Bernie Lynch; Bill Scheniman; Chris Porter

Eurogliders chronology
This Island (1984)	Absolutely (1985)	Groove (1988)

Singles from Absolutely
- 1. "We Will Together" Released: April 1985; 2. "The City of Soul" Released: September 1985; 3. "Can't Wait to See You" Released: November 1985; 4. "Absolutely" Released: February 1986; 5. "So Tough" Released: August 1986

Professional ratings
Review scores
Source	Rating
AllMusic	3/5 stars

Absolutely is the third studio album by Australian pop band Eurogliders, released on October 11, 1985 by CBS Records. It peaked at No. 7 on the Australian Kent Music Report albums chart and remained in the charts for 47 weeks; it spawned three Top 20 hit singles, "We Will Together" in April, "The City of Soul" in September and "Can't Wait to See You" in November. Two further singles, "Absolutely" and "So Tough" appeared in 1986.

At the height of the band's success, Eurogliders Grace Knight and Bernie Lynch reconciled their relationship and were married in 1985, although the union was short-lived. Despite their marital separation, they stayed together in the band for another four years.

== Track listing ==
All tracks are written by Bernie Lynch unless otherwise shown

Side one
No.	Title	Length
1.	"Can't Wait to See You"	4:15
2.	"The City of Soul"	4:50
3.	"What Kind of Fool"	3:51
4.	"So Tough"	3:43
5.	"We Will Together"	4:33

Side two
No.	Title	Writer(s)	Length
6.	"Absolutely"		4:37
7.	"Jesse"		4:30
8.	"Moving Away"	Lynch; Grace Knight	4:08
9.	"Enough Love"		3:56

== Personnel ==
Credits are adapted from the Absolutely liner notes.

Eurogliders

- Crispin Akerman — guitar
- John Bennetts — drums, percussion, drum programming
- Ron François — bass synthesiser, bass guitar
- Grace Knight — vocals
- Bernie Lynch — vocals, guitar, keyboards, arranged horns
- Amanda Vincent — keyboards, arranged horns

Additional musicians

- Jason Brewer — saxophone (tenor) (except "We Will Together")
- Mark Dennison — flute, saxophone (tenor, baritone)
- Kevin Dubber — trumpet on "We Will Together"
- James Greening — trombone (except "We Will Together")
- Martin Hill — saxophone (tenor, alto) (except "We Will Together")
- Shauna Jensen — backing vocals
- Gary Kettel — percussion
- Maggie McKinley — backing vocals
- Greg Thorne — trumpet, flugelhorn, arranged horns
- Mark Williams — backing vocals on "We Will Together"

== Charts ==
Chart (1985/86)	Peak position
Australia Kent Music Report Album Chart	7

== Certifications ==
Region	Certification	Certified units/sales
Australia (ARIA)	Platinum	70,000^{^}
^{^} Shipments figures based on certification alone.
