= Chris Whitten =

British session drummer (born 1959)

- Born: 26 March 1959 (age 67); England
- Origin: Blackpool, Lancashire, England
- Genres: Rock, pop, world
- Occupations: Musician, drummer
- Instruments: Drums, percussion, vocals

Chris Whitten (born 26 March 1959) is a British session drummer who provided drums for the hit singles "What I Am" by Edie Brickell & New Bohemians, "World Shut Your Mouth" by Julian Cope and "The Whole of the Moon" by the Waterboys. Two notable projects that Whitten was the drummer for were Paul McCartney's Flowers in the Dirt album in 1989, and Dire Straits' final world tour from 1991–1992 to accompany their last studio album, On Every Street. In Italy he is well known for playing drums with Francesco De Gregori on some tracks of the album Titanic (1982), on the eponymous album of Riccardo Cocciante, on the album Yaya of Nino Buonocore and on the 45-rpm single Uno su mille of Gianni Morandi. Whitten was also a member of the Catch, with Don Snow.

Whitten has used a Noble & Cooley drum kit. The toms and snare are single-ply, steam-bent shells which give them a distinctive sound. He has also recorded with such varied musicians as Tom Jones, Johnny Cash, the Pretenders, Swing Out Sister, ABC and The The and for Jean-Jacques Goldman for the Rouge album with Fredericks Goldman Jones.

Whitten has been an active participant and Honorary VIP Member of the Drummer Cafe community forum since 2003.

He is a specialist at drum sample production and has contributed drums and percussion with recording partner, the British engineer/producer Peter Henderson of Supertramp fame for the Toontrack drum sample libraries Custom and Vintage SDX and The Classic EZX, as well as several others.

He toured with The Dire Straits Experience and visited India to perform at a charity event in Gurgaon and Bangalore in March 2017.
