= The Balham Alligators =

UK musical group

- Origin: London, England
- Genres: Cajun, rock, blues
- Years active: 1983–present
- Labels: Proper, Special Delivery
- Members: Geraint Watkins; Robin McKidd; Paul Riley
- Past members: Pete Dennis; Kieran O'Connor; Arthur Kitchener; Ron Kavana; Gary Rickard; Bobby Irwin

The Balham Alligators were an English band from London that mixed rock 'n' roll, cajun, country and R&B. The band centred on singer and instrumentalist Geraint Watkins.

== Career ==
The band came together by chance at a London pub in 1983. The original line-up consisted of Geraint Watkins, Robin McKidd, Kieran O'Connor, Arthur Kitchener, and Gary Rickard. The Alligators played a hybrid blend of musical styles, including rock 'n' roll, blues, R&B, Celtic folk, swamp-pop, country, swing, Cajun and zydeco.

The Balham Alligators performed in venues around Europe. Early albums included The Balham Alligators and Life in a Bus Lane. The pressure of constant touring began to take its toll with the continued ill-health and eventual death of Kieran O'Connor (d. 1991), the departure of Kitchener and Ron Kavana, and despite the recruitment of Pete Dennis to replace Kitchener convinced the remaining members it was time to call it a day.

The following years were spent pursuing individual projects with Watkins and Rickard working with Charlie Hart as, Rickard, Watkins & Hart, with Watkins eventually leading his own outfit, The Wobblers, in 1992. Robin McKidd formed The Companions of The Rosy Hours a western-swing band. Despite the four years since the original band's demise, McKidd was still receiving offers of work for the Alligators, persuading Watkins and Rickard to try out a few gigs with The Wobblers as a backing band, it became apparent that the Alligators were still a viable concern. Bolstered with morale and momentum they recruited session musician Bobby Irwin on drums and ex-Chilli Willi and the Red Hot Peppers' bass guitarist Paul Riley and, by the latter half of 1995, they recorded Gateway to the South (1996) and followed by Cajun Dance Party (1997).

== Discography ==
=== Albums ===
- Balham Alligators
- Life in the Bus-Lane
- Live Alligators
- Gateway to the South
- Cajun Dance Party
- A Po'boy 'n' Make It Snappy
- Bayou-degradable
