= This Island (Eurogliders album) =

Studio album by Eurogliders
- Released: 7 May 1984 (Australia); 1 June 1984 (UK)
- Recorded: March, July–December 1983
- Genre: Pop; new wave; dance-pop
- Length: 42:58
- Label: CBS
- Producer: Nigel Gray; Mark Opitz

Eurogliders chronology
Pink Suit Blue Day (1982)	This Island (1984)	Absolutely (1985)

Singles from This Island
- 1. "No Action" Released: May 1983; 2. "Another Day in the Big World" Released: December 1983; 3. "Heaven (Must Be There)" Released: May 1984; 4. "Maybe Only I Dream" Released: August 1984

Professional ratings
Review scores
Source	Rating
AllMusic	4/5 stars

This Island is the second studio album by Australian pop band Eurogliders, released on 7 May 1984 by CBS Records.

The album had a lengthy recording process. Eurogliders changed record labels from PolyGram to CBS in 1983, and recorded the track "No Action" with producer Mark Opitz; it was released as a single in 1983 and peaked at No. 97. The band then replaced bassist Geoff Rosenberg (who had not played on "No Action") with Scott Saunders, and travelled to the UK in July. While there, they replaced Saunders with bassist Ron François, formerly of the Teardrop Explodes and Lene Lovich. With this line-up they recorded the rest of This Island, produced by Nigel Gray (who had also worked with the Police).

By the end of the year, the album recording was complete, but was still not ready for release. Mark Moffatt was brought in to remix six album tracks; meanwhile, the single "Another Day in the Big World" was issued in December 1983. It peaked at No. 66 in Australia.

The album was eventually released in May 1984 and peaked at No. 4 on the Australian Albums Chart. The single, "Heaven (Must Be There)", reached No. 2 on the Australian singles charts, and No. 65 on the US Billboard Hot 100 chart and No. 21 on its Mainstream Rock Tracks chart. The album peaked at No. 140 on the Billboard 200 chart.

== Track listing ==
All tracks are written by Bernie Lynch

Side one
No.	Title	Length
1.	"Heaven (Must Be There)"	3:43
2.	"Someone"	3:38
3.	"No Action"	3:25
4.	"Never Say"	3:35
5.	"Maybe Only I Dream"	3:17
6.	"Cold Comfort"	3:35

Side two
No.	Title	Length
7.	"Another Day in the Big World"	3:02
8.	"Keep it Quiet"	2:52
9.	"Nothing to Say"	3:42
10.	"Judy's World"	3:53
11.	"Waiting for You"	4:25
12.	"It's the Way"	3:33
Total length:		42:58

== Personnel ==
Credits are adapted from the This Island liner notes.

Eurogliders

- Crispin Akerman — guitar
- John Bennetts — drums; percussion; cymbals
- Ron François — synthesiser; bass guitar; backing vocals
- Grace Knight — vocals; tenor saxophone; keyboards
- Bernie Lynch — vocals; synthesiser
- Amanda Vincent — synthesiser; keyboards; glockenspiel

Additional musicians

- Mark Bhan — trumpet
- Mark Isham — trumpet
- Gary Kettel — percussion
- Sam McNally — bass synth on "No Action"
- Mark Moffatt — drums; drum programming
- Giselle Scales — violin

Production and artwork

- Nigel Gray – producer; engineer
- Mark Opitz – producer
- David Nicholas – engineer
- Jim Ebdon – engineer
- Pete Buhlman – engineer
- Mark Moffatt – remixing
- Δ – mastering engineer
- A&L Barnum Graphic Design – cover concept; design

== Charts ==
Chart (1984)	Peak position
Australia Kent Music Report Album Chart	4

== Certifications ==
Region	Certification	Certified units/sales
Australia (ARIA)	Platinum	70,000^{^}
^{^} Shipments figures based on certification alone.
