= Don Snow =

English musician and producer (born 1957)

- Also known as: Jonn Savannah
- Born: 13 January 1957 (age 69); London, England
- Genres: Rock, pop, new wave
- Occupations: Musician, producer
- Instruments: Vocals, keyboards, guitar, saxophone
- Years active: 1978–present
- Website: www.jonnsavannah.com

Don Snow (born 13 January 1957 in London) is a British vocalist and multi-instrumentalist, who plays the Hammond organ, piano, guitar, bass guitar, drums and saxophone. He is primarily known for his work with the new wave bands Squeeze, the Sinceros and the Catch, as well as Procol Harum. He has also frequently toured with Van Morrison and has played the Hammond organ and piano on three of his albums.

== Career ==
He started his career in 1978 as an original member of the new wave/power pop outfit the Sinceros, who were signed to Epic Records and released a string of successful albums. Around this time, he also played with Lene Lovich and Bill Nelson, before he joined Squeeze in 1982, replacing Paul Carrack. At this time, he recorded with drummer Chris Whitten as the Catch, releasing the single "25 Years" which reached number 3 on the German charts, sold half a million copies and stayed on the charts for 40 weeks. He also recorded with artists such as Judie Tzuke, Tracey Ullman, Nik Kershaw, ABC and Sheila Walsh.

In 1987, he joined Tina Turner for her Break Every Rule World Tour and recorded the album Live in Europe. He also recorded with Roger Daltrey, Tom Jones, Jimmy Somerville, Chris Eaton, Holly Johnson, Boy George, Jaki Graham and Gary Moore. On 11 June 1988, Snow played the first Nelson Mandela benefit at the Wembley Arena along with Al Green, Joe Cocker, Natalie Cole, Jonathan Butler, Freddie Jackson, and Ashford & Simpson.

In 1990, Snow played with the John Lennon tribute band in Liverpool, before he re-joined Squeeze in 1991 for touring. In 1992, after appearing on records by Tina Turner, Judie Tzuke, Thomas Anders and Heartland, he played keyboards for Procol Harum (including their second orchestral concert in Edmonton, Canada) and later played for Van Morrison. He joined Squeeze for the third time in 1995 and played with Morrison again in 1998.

Since 2000, he has recorded releases with Kylie Minogue, Melanie C, Joe Cocker, Mark Owen, Michael Ball and released several solo albums.

In December 1992, he changed his name to Jonn Savannah. He moved to Medford, New Jersey, in 2005.

== Discography ==
=== Album credits ===
- 1978 – Lene Lovich – Stateless
- 1979 – The Sinceros – The Sound of Sunbathing
- 1979 – The Barron Knights – Tell the World to Laugh
- 1979 – Peter C. Johnson – Peter C. Johnson
- 1980 – Johnny Logan – Save Me
- 1980 – The Vibrators – Batteries Included
- 1981 – The Sinceros – Pet Rock
- 1981 – The Quick – Ship to Shore
- 1981 – The Sinceros – 2nd Debut
- 1981 – Fingerprintz – Beat Noir
- 1982 – Jona Lewie – Heart Skips Beat
- 1982 – Judie Tzuke – Shoot the Moon
- 1982 – Squeeze – Sweets from a Stranger
- 1982 – Fern Kinney – All It Takes Love to Know Love
- 1983 – Wendy & the Rocketts – Dazed for Days
- 1983 – Bianca – Where the Beat Meets the Street
- 1983 – Judie Tzuke – Ritmo
- 1983 – Tracey Ullman – They Don't Know
- 1984 – The Catch – Balance on Wires
- 1984 – Nik Kershaw – The Riddle
- 1984 – Nik Kershaw – Human Racing
- 1984 – Tracey Ullman – You Caught Me Out
- 1984 – Tin Tin – Kiss Me
- 1984 – Paul Da Vinci – Work So Hard
- 1985 – ABC – How to be a Zillionaire!
- 1985 – Gianni Morandi – Uno So Mille
- 1985 – Sheila Walsh – Shadowlands
- 1987 – The Catch – Walk the Water
- 1987 – Roger Daltrey – Can't Wait to See the Movie
- 1987 – Model – Model
- 1987 – Chris Eaton – Vision
- 1988 – Tina Turner – Live in Europe
- 1989 – Holly Johnson – Blast
- 1989 – Jimmy Somerville – Read My Lips
- 1989 – Tom Jones – At This Moment
- 1989 – Gary Moore – Wild Frontier
- 1989 – Jaki Graham – From Now On
- 1989 – Baby Ford – Beach Bump
- 1991 – Thomas Anders – Whispers
- 1991 – Tina Turner – Simply the Best
- 1991 – Judie Tzuke – Left Hand Talking
- 1991 – Heartland – Heartland
- 1991 – This Picture – A Violent Impression
- 1992 – Judie Tzuke – I Can Read Books
- 1993 – Van Morrison – Too Long in Exile
- 1994 – Van Morrison – A Night in San Francisco
- 1994 – Hanne Boel – Misty Paradise
- 1994 – Gregory Gray – Euroflake in Silverlake
- 1995 – Brian Kennedy – Intuition
- 1995 – Martyn Joseph – Martyn Joseph
- 1995 – Jimmy Somerville – Dare to Love
- 1995 – Van Morrison – Days Like This
- 1996 – Ray Charles – Strong Love Affair
- 1996 – Squeeze – Ridiculous
- 1996 – Right Said Fred – Smashing!
- 1996 – Judie Tzuke – Under the Angels
- 1997 – The Vibrators – Demos & Raities
- 1999 – Joe Cocker – No Ordinary World
- 1999 – Ashley Maher – The Blessed Rain
- 1999 – Siggi – Siggi
- 1999 – Emmet Swimming – Big Night Without You
- 2000 – Kylie Minogue – Light Years
- 2000 – Ruth – Ruth
- 2001 – Russell Watson – The Voice
- 2001 – Steve Balsamo – All I Am
- 2003 – Melanie C – Reason
- 2003 – American Idol – Season 2
- 2003 – Ruben Studdard – Superstar
- 2003 – Sandi Russell – Incascedent
- 2004 – American Idol – Season 3
- 2004 – Mark Owen – In Your Own Time
- 2005 – Bernie Armstrong – The Face of Christ
- 2006 – Heavy Little Elephants – Heavy Little Elephants
- 2006 – Michael Ball – One Voice
- 2007 – Pawnshop Roses – Let It Roll
- 2009 – Carsie Blanton – Carsie Blanton
- 2009 – Alcaz – On Se Dit Tout
- 2010 – Alexis Cunningham – Wonderlust
- 2011 – Alexis Cunningham – Love at the End of the World
- 2014 – Die Fantastischen Vier (feat. Jonn Savannah) – 25
