= The Sinceros =

English new wave and power pop band (1978–1981)

- Origin: London, England
- Genres: New wave, power pop
- Years active: 1978–1981
- Labels: Epic; Columbia
- Past members: Mark Kjeldsen; Ron François; Don Snow; Bobby Irwin

The Sinceros were a new wave and power pop band from London, England, who recorded two albums for Epic Records, The Sound of Sunbathing (1979) and Pet Rock (1981). Both albums were released worldwide and achieved moderate commercial success.

== Career ==
Singer, guitarist and main songwriter Mark Kjeldsen, drummer Bobby Irwin and bassist Ron François first played together in a London R&B band called The Strutters.

The Sinceros were primarily a vehicle for Kjeldsen's composing talents. He sang lead vocals on most of the band's material although François contributed three songs to their second album.

Prior to signing their Epic Records recording contract, the rhythm section, Irwin and François, participated in the recording of Stiff Records' recording artist Lene Lovich's Stateless album. Keyboardist Don Snow joined them in support of the record on the 1978 "Be Stiff" Tour, thus completing the Sinceros line-up.

Their first album, The Sound of Sunbathing, was produced by Joe Wissert and recorded at Wessex Studios in London. The band achieved considerable radio play with its first single, "Take Me to Your Leader". They toured extensively after the release of the album, riding on the heels of the then thriving new wave music scene, though not as extensively as was originally planned due to band management and record company squabbles over financing. Undeterred, the band continued to accept studio session work with other artists, with Irwin and Snow particularly in demand (both would later play with Van Morrison).

An attempt at a follow-up album entitled, 2nd Debut, produced by Paul Riley was shelved by Epic Records and was essentially reworked into Pet Rock, under the guidance of producer Gus Dudgeon.

Several FM radio recordings of the band circulate, notably one from 13 December 1979 at The Palladium in New York City, that was broadcast by WNEW-FM. Dubbed the "$5 Rock and Roll Show", the bill also featured Bruce Woolley, Paul Collins' Beat and 20/20 and was attended by Mick Jagger. The band also made appearances at Hurrah in New York. Kjeldsen wears a T-shirt featuring this club's logo on the Pet Rock album cover.

The Sinceros disbanded in 1981. After their demise, Kjeldsen performed with the Danny Adler Band (ex-Roogalator). A live album featuring Kjeldsen on rhythm guitar was recorded at the Winterthur, Switzerland, on 10 August 1982 and released in 1983. In the 1990s, Kjeldsen became a social worker in London. He died of AIDS in 1992.

In 1982, Snow joined Squeeze as a replacement for Paul Carrack, though the band disbanded soon thereafter (he has played with two later versions of Squeeze). He has done extension session work and live tours with artists ranging from Tina Turner to Van Morrison. Since the early 1990s, he has gone by the name Jonn Savannah.

François joined The Teardrop Explodes and stayed with Epic Records releasing a solo single, "If You Love Me", in 1982 before departing to live in Australia where he has worked with local artists such as James Reyne, Wendy Matthews and The Eurogliders.

Irwin resumed working with Nick Lowe before departing in 1985 to live and work in San Antonio, Texas. Since his return to the UK in 1992, he worked with Nick Lowe once more, as well as Van Morrison and others. He died in 2015.

== Reissues ==
The Sinceros' first album The Sound of Sunbathing has been made available on CD via Cherry Red Records with three bonus tracks which was released on 18 May 2009 with the catalogue number CDM RED 396. One track from this album had previously been available on CD, "Take Me to Your Leader", which was included on the compilation albums New Wave Hits of the 70's & 80's, Big Hits, Skinny Ties: New Wave in the UK and Reader's Digest Sounds of the Seventies 1979 Box Set. The three bonus tracks included of this CD are (track 11) "Are You Ready?", (12) "Up There" and (13) "Walls, Floors and Ceilings (Live)". More recently, their follow up album Pet Rock has also been made available on CD with many more bonus tracks. Pet Rock was released during 2010 on Wounded Bird / Sony with the catalogue number WOU 7349. Apart from the original 11 tracks featured on the vinyl version, tracks 12–21 make up what was to have been the subsequently shelved follow up to Sunbathing titled 2nd Debut, but this was never commercially available. This 'unreleased' album does however include duplicated songs as featured in the original Pet Rock album, but they are either alternate takes or alternate versions of the songs. Finally, four additional songs appear as bonus tracks, (22) "Torture Myself", (23) "Beady Eyes", (24) "Television Vision" and (25) an extended version of "Take Me to Your Leader" (the shorter version already being available on the Sunbathing album).

== Discography ==
=== Albums ===
- 1979 – The Sound of Sunbathing
- 1980 – 2nd Debut
- 1981 – Pet Rock

=== Singles ===
Year	Title	AUS	NL
1979	"Take Me to Your Leader"	70	–
1979	"Worlds Apart"	81	39
1980	"Are You Ready"	–	–
1980	"Disappearing"	–	–
1981	"Memory Lane"	–	–
1981	"Socially"	–	–

== Performances ==
=== Concerts: 1978 ===
August

- 11 – Rochester Castle, Stoke Newington, London
- 13 – Golden Lion, Fulham, London
- 18 – Town Hall, High Wycombe (supporting The Rezillos)

September

- 01 – Metro Club, Plymouth
- 12 – Hope & Anchor, Islington, London
- 23 – Dingwalls, Camden Lock, London (supporting The News)

October

- 01 – The Roundhouse, Chalk Farm, London (Anti-Nazi Rally)

November

- 23 – Hope & Anchor, Islington, London
- 30 – Hope & Anchor, Islington, London

December

- 01 – Dingwalls, Camden Lock, London
- 07 – Hope & Anchor, Islington, London
- 13 – Chelsea Art College, London

=== Concerts: 1979 ===
January

- 02 – The Nashville Rooms, West Kensington, London
- 22 – Hope & Anchor, Islington, London
- 26 – Dingwalls, Camden Lock, London

February

- 21 – Nelson's, Wimbledon F.C., London
- 28 – Dingwalls, Camden Lock, London

March

- 10 – Hope & Anchor, Islington, London

May

- 01 – The Venue, Victoria, London (supporting Johnny Winter)
- 02 – Nelson's, Wimbledon F.C., London
- 03 – West Surrey College of Art
- 04 – The Venue, Victoria, London (supporting Johnny Winter)
- 05 – Portsmouth Polytechnic
- 06 – The Venue, Victoria, London (supporting Johnny Winter)
- 11 – Brunel University, Uxbridge (supporting Rachel Sweet)
- 12 – Essex University, Colchester (supporting Rachel Sweet)
- 14 – The Marquee, Soho, London
- 17 – Dingwalls, Camden Lock, London
- 21 – The Nashville Rooms, West Kensington, London

June

- 04 – The Marquee, Soho, London
- 15 – Trent Polytechnic, Nottingham
- 16 – Froebel College, Twickenham
- 18 – The Marquee, Soho, London (recorded by the Stiff Mobile Studio)
- 22 – Weymouth
- 25 – Loughborough University, Nottingham
- 28 – University of Warwick, Warwick
- 29 – Radlett Wall Hall College, (supporting Chairmen of the Board)

July

- 02 – The Marquee, Soho, London
- 07 – Jacksdale Grey Topper, Nottingham
- 12 – The Fan Club, Leeds
- 13 – The Limit Club, Sheffield
- 14 – The Norbreck Hotel, Blackpool
- 15 – The Stagecoach, Dumfries
- 16 – Tiffany's, Edinburgh
- 19 – The Nashville Rooms, West Kensington, London
- 20 – The Sand Piper, Nottingham
- 21 – The Boogie House, Norwich
- 26 – The Nashville Rooms, West Kensington, London
- 27 – AJ's, Lincoln
- 28 – The Venue, Victoria, London

August

- 03 – JB's Dudley
- 04 – Hope & Anchor, Islington, London
- 05 – Hope & Anchor, Islington, London
- 25 – The Music Machine, London

September

- 01 – Lees Cliff Hall, Folkestone
- 27 – Liverpool Polytechnic
- 28 – Southbank Polytechnic, London

October

- 01 – Queen Mary College, London
- 03 – Reading University, Reading
- 05 – King's College, London
- 06 – UMIST, Manchester
- 10 – Swansea University
- 11 – Dorset Institute of Higher Education, Town Hall, Bournemouth
- 12 – The Paradiso Club, Amsterdam (recorded and broadcast by VPRO Radio)
- 13 – The Exit Club, Rotterdam
- 18 – The Nashville Rooms, West Kensington, London
- 25 – Cornell University, New York, (with The Laughing Dogs)
- 26 – Buffalo University, (supporting Cock Robin)
- 28 – The Penny Arcade, Rochester, New York, (supporting Freeway)
- 31 – Worcester Polytechnic Institute, Massachusetts

November

- 01 – Stage West, Hartford, Connecticut
- 02 – Hurrah, New York City
- 03 – Hurrah, New York City
- 06 – The Jabberwocky Club, Syracuse University, New York
- 07 – Sir Morgan's Cove, Worcester, Massachusetts (broadcast live on WAAF Radio)
- 08 – Emerald City, Cherry Hill, New Jersey (supporting The A's)
- 09 – University of Massachusetts Amherst, Amherst, Massachusetts (supported by The Motels)
- 10 – Toad's, New Haven, Connecticut (supported by The Motels)
- 11 – Lupo's, Providence, Rhode Island (supported by The Motels)
- 13 – My Father's Place, Long Island, New York (broadcast live on WLIR Radio)
- 14 – The Fast Lane, Asbury Park, New Jersey (supported by The Motels)
- 15 – The Bayou Club, Washington D.C., (supported by [The Motels)
- 16 – Stars, Rats Keller, University of Connecticut, Connecticut
- 17 – The Rat, Boston, Massachusetts (supported by Live Wire)
- 18 – The Rat, Boston, Massachusetts (supported by Live Wire)
- 27 – My Father's Place, Long Island, New York
- 30 – Mother's, Chicago, Illinois

December

- 01 – Mother's, Chicago, Illinois
- 02 – The Stone Toad, Milwaukee, Wisconsin (supported by Youthinesia)
- 04 – The Long Horn, Minneapolis, Minnesota
- 07 – Beginnings, Schaumburg, Illinois (supporting Pez Band)
- 08 – Beginnings, Schaumburg, Illinois (supporting Pez Band)
- 10 – The Agora, Cleveland, Ohio (with The Sports and 20/20)
- 11 – Bogart's, Cincinnati, Ohio (supporting The Sports)
- 12 – The Landmark Theatre, Syracuse New York (supporting Southside Johnny and the Asbury Jukes)
- 13 – The Palladium, New York City (with Bruce Woolley, Paul Collins' Beat and 20/20 (band)|20/20 – broadcast by WNEW-FM Radio)

=== Concerts: 1980 ===
January

- 18 – Goldsmith College, London
- 19 – The Midem Festival, Cannes (with The Inmates and Marquis de Sade)

March

- 16 – Pavillon Baltard, Nogent-sur-Marne, France (with Squeeze and Valerie Lagrange)

May

- 22 – The Venue, Victoria, London (supported by Jules and the Polar Bears)

June

- 10 – Dingwalls, Camden Lock, London
- 11 – Middlesex & Herts Country Club, Harrow, London
- 12 – Southbank Polytechnic, London
- 13 – The Half Moon, Herne Hill, London
- 14 – The Bridge House, Canning Town, London
- 21 – The Winsum Festival, Groningen, the Netherlands

July

- 26 – The Bridge House, Canning Town, London
- 27 – The Half Moon, Herne Hill, London
- 28 – The Marquee, Soho, London
- 29 – The Greyhound, London
- 30 – Middlesex & Herts Country Club, Harrow, London

August

- 17 – The Venue, Victoria, London
- 18 – The Zero 6 Club, Southend-on-Sea

=== Concerts: 1980 – The Sinceros (Hall & Oates Tour) ===
September

- 11 – Bristol Hippodrome, Bristol
- 12 – Southampton Gaumont, Southampton
- 14 – Coventry New Theatre, Coventry
- 15 – The Apollo, Manchester
- 16 – Southport Theatre, Southport
- 17 – Edinburgh Playhouse, Edinburgh
- 19 – Oxford New Theatre, Oxford
- 20 – Brighton Dome, Brighton
- 21 – Fairfield Halls, Croydon
- 22 – Hammersmith Odeon, Hammersmith, London
- 23 – Hammersmith Odeon, Hammersmith, London
- 24 – Birmingham Odeon, Birmingham

=== Radio shows: 1979 ===
June

- 01 – BBC Radio One session, BBC Maida Vale Studios, London
- 20 – Radio One in Concert – Paris Theatre Studios, London

=== Radio shows: 1981 ===
July

- 15 – Radio One In Concert, London

=== TV shows: 1980 ===
- Runaround - Southern Television

== Bibliography ==
- Colin Larkin, The Guinness Encyclopedia of Popular Music – Page 3578, Guinness, 1995, ISBN 1-56159-176-9
