= Proper Records =

- Founder: Malcolm Mills
- Distributor(s): Proper Music Distribution
- Genre: Various
- Country of origin: England
- Location: London
- Official website: www.proper-records.co.uk

Proper Records is an English record label founded by Proper Music Group Chairman – Malcolm Mills and Paul Riley. Commencing with a handful of releases, including the Balham Alligators and Chilli Willi and the Red Hot Peppers, the label grew in stature and renown through its reissue marque, 'Proper Box'. Featuring jazz, country, and rock and roll artists, these releases now total over 200.

The label has become better known for releasing new albums by contemporary artists such as Bonnie Raitt, Joan Baez, Richard Thompson, Nick Lowe, Dr. John, Los Lobos, Willie Nelson & Asleep at the Wheel, the Blind Boys of Alabama, Loudon Wainwright III and many more.

Subsidiary labels include Specific Jazz and Navigator Records.

The company was based on an industrial estate in south London but relocated to Surrey Quays in 2017. Sister company Proper Music Distribution has won the Music Week Distributor of the Year Award three times.

== Roster ==
- Aimee Mann
- Alison Moorer
- Andy Fairweather Low
- Andy McKee
- Angélique Kidjo
- Art Garfunkel
- Asleep at the Wheel
- Baddies
- Bap Kennedy
- Ben Glover
- Bill Kirchen
- Blancmange
- Blind Boys of Alabama
- Bonnie Raitt
- Chilli Willi and the Red Hot Peppers
- Cowboy Junkies
- Dan Penn
- Dave Rotheray
- Dave Stewart
- Dennis Locorriere
- Diana Jones
- Don McLean
- Dr. John
- Elizabeth Cook
- Gretchen Peters
- Hacienda Brothers
- Huey Lewis & The News
- The Hot Club of Cowtown
- Ian McLagan
- Jackie Brenston
- Jimmie Vaughan
- Jimmy Webb
- Joan Baez
- Drumbo
- Krissy Matthews
- Laurence Jones
- Little Feat
- Los Lobos
- Loudon Wainwright III
- Malcolm Holcombe
- Mary Gauthier
- Matraca Berg
- Neilson Hubbard
- Nick Lowe
- Nicole Atkins
- Paul Brady
- Paul Heaton
- Pete Brown
- Red Sky July
- Richard Thompson
- Robyn Hitchcock
- Ruthie Foster
- Sonny Landreth
- Spooner Oldham
- Steve Cradock
- Suzy Bogguss
- Texas Tornados
- The Balham Alligators
- The Features
- The Waterboys
- The Webb Sisters
- Tim O'Brien
- Tom Russell
- Willie Nelson
- Wynonie Harris
