= Stormy Weather (Grace Knight album) =

Studio album by Grace Knight
- Released: September 1991
- Studio: Studios 301
- Label: Columbia
- Producer: Larry Muhoberac

Grace Knight chronology
| Come in Spinner (1990) | Stormy Weather (1991) | Gracious (1993) |

Stormy Weather is the debut studio album by Australian singer, Grace Knight. Released in September 1991 it peaked at number 16 on the ARIA Charts and was certified platinum.

At the ARIA Music Awards of 1992, the album was nominated for Best Adult Contemporary Album.

== Track listing ==
| No. | Title | Writer(s) | Length |
|---|---|---|---|
| 1. | "Fever" | Eddie Cooley; John Davenport | 3:39 |
| 2. | "Drinking Again" | Johnny Mercer; Doris Tauber | 3:05 |
| 3. | "Love or Leave Me" | Walter Donaldson; Gus Kahn | 2:14 |
| 4. | "Guess Who I Saw Today" | Elise Boyd; Murray Grand | 2:59 |
| 5. | "Walkin' After Midnight" | Alan Block; Donn Hecht | 3:09 |
| 6. | "That Ole Devil Called Love" | Allan Roberts; Doris Fisher | 3:07 |
| 7. | "Danny Boy" | Frederic Weatherly | 3:08 |
| 8. | "Stormy Weather" | Harold Arlen; Ted Koehler | 4:25 |
| 9. | "Momma He Treats Your Daughter Mean" | Charles Singleton; Herb Lance; Johnny Wallace | 2:57 |
| 10. | "Crazy" | Willie Nelson |
| 11. | "Picking Up After You" | Tom Waits | 3:38 |
| 12. | "You'll Never Know" | Harry Warren; Mack Gordon | 4:25 |
| 13. | "God Bless the Child" | Arthur Herzog Jr.; Billie Holiday | 5:34 |

== Charts ==
=== Weekly charts ===
| Chart (1990/91) | Peak position |
|---|---|
| Australian Albums (ARIA) | 16 |

=== Year-end charts ===
| Chart (1991) | Position |
|---|---|
| Australian Albums (ARIA) | 61 |

== Certifications ==
| Region | Certification | Certified units/sales |
|---|---|---|
| Australia (ARIA) | Platinum | 70,000^{^} |
^{^} Shipments figures based on certification alone.
