= Heartland (British band) =

British hard rock band

Heartland is a British hard rock and AOR band. They have released eleven albums.

== Discography ==
- Heartland (1991)
- Wide Open (1994)
- Heartland III (1995)
- Bridge of Fools (1997)
- Miracles By Design (1998)
- When Angels Call (1999)
- As It Comes (2000)
- Communication Down (2002)
- Move On (2005)
- Mind Your Head (2007)
- Travelling Through Time (compilation, 2011)
- Into the Future (2021)
