= Absolutely (Eurogliders song) =

- 2x 7" single cover

Single by Eurogliders

from the album Absolutely!
- B-side: "Learning How to Swim"
- Released: February 1986
- Studio: Rhinoceros Studios, Sydney
- Genre: Pop rock, new wave, Synth-pop
- Label: CBS
- Songwriter: Bernie Lynch
- Producer: Bernie Lynch

Eurogliders singles chronology
"Can't Wait to See You" (1985)	"Absolutely" (1986)	"So Tough" (1986)

"Absolutely" is a song by Eurogliders, released in February 1986 as the fourth single from their third studio album, Absolutely! (1985). The song peaked at number 29 on the Australian Kent Music Report. Part of the music video was filmed on top of Australian heritage artifact, Sydney Water Reservoir Number 1 in Sydney's Centennial Park.

== Track listing ==
7" Single

- Side A "Absolutely"
- Side B "Learning How to Swim"

12" Single

- Side A "Absolutely" (Extended Mix) - 6:41
- Side B "Rescue Me" (Recorded Live at Billboard, Melbourne) - 2:59

2x 7" Single

- Side A "Absolutely"
- Side B "Rescue Me" (Recorded Live at Billboard, Melbourne)
- Side C "Absolutely" (Recorded Live at Billboard, Melbourne)
- Side D "Rescue Me" (Recorded Live at Billboard, Melbourne)

== Chart performance ==
Chart (1986)	Peak position
Australia (Kent Music Report)	29
