= Danny Adler =

American blues-rock guitarist (born 1949)

Danny Adler (born 1949) is an American blues-rock guitarist.

Adler was born in Cincinnati, Ohio, United States. After playing with leading Cincinnati musicians, such as Bootsy Collins, Slim Harpo, H-Bomb Ferguson and Albert Washington, in the early 1960s, he went to San Francisco in 1969 to join John Lee Hooker, T-Bone Walker, Solomon Burke, and experimental group Elephant's Memory.

Moving to England in 1971, he founded Roogalator, one of the first signings by the fledgling Stiff Records, as well as appearing regularly with Rocket 88, the back-to-the-roots boogie-woogie band which included Rolling Stones drummer Charlie Watts, Ian Stewart, Jack Bruce and many other leading UK-based musicians.

In 1980 he put together another blues-rock revival band, the De Luxe Blues Band, with Bob Hall, Bob Brunning and Micky Waller. Dick Heckstall-Smith joined soon after. The band originated as a pick-up band to accompany visiting American blues performers Eddy Clearwater and Carey Bell but stayed together for over 12 years and recorded five albums. They disbanded when Adler returned to the US in 1990, although Brunning later revived the band with a new line-up.

In 1989, Adler tried to dupe the blues community by 'discovering' a long lost blues musician, Otis "Elevator" Gilmore. A major blues reissue label fell for the ploy, and issued an album supposedly by Gilmore, when it was simply the work of Adler. Eventually the hoax was discovered and the album was withdrawn, although copies circulated for years afterwards on a white label.

== Discography ==
- The Roogalator Years – 1975–1978
- Early Danny Adler – Roogalator 1975–1978
- Funky Afternoons – 1979
- Gusha Gusha Music – 1980
- A Street Car Named De Luxe – The De Luxe Blues Band (1981)
- Live at Half Moon Putney – The De Luxe Blues Band (1981)
- The Danny Adler Band Live – 1982
- The Danny Adler Band – 1983
- Urban De Luxe – The De Luxe Blues Band (1983)
- Hubcap Heaven – 1986
- Otis "Elevator" Gilmore – 1986
- Hometowns and High Iron – 1987
- Night Shift – 1987
- The De Luxe Blues Band – 1988
- Motorvating – The De Luxe Blues Band (1988)
- Mackinaw City – 1989
- Homestretch – 1990
- Jazzin At RVG's – 1993
- Mother's Day – 1999
- Bit Of Beatles - 2017
