= The City of Soul =

Single by Eurogliders

from the album Absolutely!
- B-side: "When the Stars Come Out"
- Released: August 1985
- Studio: Rhinoceros Studios, Sydney
- Genre: Pop rock, Synth-pop
- Label: CBS
- Songwriter: Bernie Lynch
- Producer: Chris Porter

Eurogliders singles chronology
"We Will Together" (1985)	"The City of Soul" (1985)	"Can't Wait to See You" (1985)

"The City of Soul" is a song by Eurogliders, released in August 1985 as the second single from their third studio album, Absolutely! (1985). The song was inspired by the events of the 1985 MOVE bombing in Philadelphia. The song peaked at number 19 on the Australian Kent Music Report.

== Track listing ==
7" Single

- Side A "The City of Soul"
- Side B "When The Stars Come Out"

12" Single

- Side A "The City of Soul" (The Pugwash [For the People] Extended Mix) - 5:46
- Side B "The City of Soul" (Single Mix)
- Side B "When The Stars Come Out"

== Chart performance ==
Chart (1985)	Peak position
Australia (Kent Music Report)	19
