= Come In Spinner (album) =

Come in Spinner

Soundtrack album by Vince Jones and Grace Knight
- Released: March 1990
- Studio: Paradise Studios, ABC Studios, Martin Armiger Studios
- Label: ABC Music
- Producer: Martin Armiger

Vince Jones albums chronology
Trustworthy Little Sweethearts (1989)	Come in Spinner (1990)	One Day Spent (1990)

Grace Knight chronology
Come in Spinner (1990)	Stormy Weather (1991)

Come in Spinner is the soundtrack album to the Australian Broadcasting Corporation 1989/1990 television miniseries based on the 1951 novel Come in Spinner by Dymphna Cusack and Florence James. The album is credited to Vince Jones and Grace Knight with orchestral arrangements and conducting by Derek Williams and William Motzing. It was recorded at Paradise Studios, Sydney, with Martin Armiger as Producer.

At the ARIA Music Awards of 1991, the album won the ARIA Award for Best Adult Contemporary Album and was nominated for Best Original Soundtrack, Cast or Show Album and Knight was nominated for Best Female Artist. The album achieved double platinum sales and peaked at No 4 on the ARIA Charts. It became the highest selling jazz album in Australian history with sales exceeding 230,000 copies.

== Track listing ==
No.	Title	Writer(s)	Length
1.	"I've Got You Under My Skin" (performed by Vince Jones)	Cole Porter	3:21
2.	"The Man I Love" (performed by Grace Knight)	George Gershwin; Ira Gershwin	3:37
3.	"Mood Indigo" (performed by Vince Jones)	Duke Ellington; Barney Bigard; Irving Mills	4:17
4.	"Don't Know Much About Love" (performed by Grace Knight)	Martin Armiger	2:32
5.	"L'il Darlin'" (performed by Vince Jones)	Jon Hendricks; Neal Hefti	4:32
6.	"Don't Get Around Much Anymore" (performed by Grace Knight)	Duke Ellington; Bob Russell	4:18
7.	"I Get Along Without You Very Well" (performed by Vince Jones)	Hoagy Carmichael	4:11
8.	"Sophisticated Lady" (performed by Grace Knight)	Duke Ellington; Irving Mills; Mitchell Parish	3:21
9.	"You Go to My Head" (performed by Vince Jones)	J. Fred Coots; Haven Gillespie	3:23
10.	"Loose Lips" (performed by Grace Knight)	Armiger; Fletcher Henderson	2:55
11.	"Body and Soul" (performed by Vince Jones)	Johnny Green; Edward Heyman; Robert Sour; Frank Eyton	3:39
12.	"Joy Juice" (performed by Grace Knight)	Dinah Washington; Holmes Daylie	3:12
13.	"In a Sentimental Mood" (performed by Max Lambert)		2:20
14.	"Lover, Come Back to Me" (performed by Grace Knight)	Sigmund Romberg; Oscar Hammerstein II	3:18

== Charts ==
=== Weekly charts ===
Chart (1990/91)	Peak position
Australian Albums (ARIA)	4
New Zealand Albums (RMNZ)	14

=== Year-end charts ===
Chart (1990)	Position
Australian Albums (ARIA)	18

== Certifications ==
Region	Certification	Certified units/sales
Australia (ARIA)	2× Platinum	140,000^{^}
^{^} Shipments figures based on certification alone.
