= Ron François =

British musician (born 1958)

- Born: Ronald Albert François; April 1958 (age 68)
- Origin: England
- Genres: Rock; new wave; soul; funk
- Occupations: Bass player; singer; songwriter; record producer
- Instruments: Vocals; bass; guitar; keyboards; drums
- Website: Point Studio

Ronald Albert François (born April 1958) is a British musician, who first came to notice as the lead singer and bass player of the English R&B band The Strutters, which was involved in the London pub rock scene of the mid-1970s.

In 1978, he recorded the debut album Stateless with the Lene Lovich band, from which came the UK hit single "Lucky Number". He then toured with the Lene Lovich band on the Stiff Records "Be Stiff Route 78 Tour" of the UK and New York.

From 1978 to 1981, François worked with ex-Strutters Mark Kjeldsen and Bobbi (Irwin) Trehern in the Sinceros, who made two albums for Epic Records, The Sound of Sunbathing and Pet Rock, and achieved moderate success before they disbanded in 1981.

François continued playing sessions while remaining with Epic Records, releasing a solo single, "If You Love Me", before joining the Teardrop Explodes for their Wilder album tour of the UK, Europe, Australia and the US. He also played on the 1984 Julian Cope solo album World Shut Your Mouth.

In 1984, François played bass guitar on the album This Island with Eurogliders. Produced by Nigel Gray in his Oxfordshire studio, the album included the top ten single "Heaven (Must Be There)". François left the UK to live and work in Australia. He played bass and synthesizer on the Eurogliders next LP, Absolutely. The album was in the charts for 47 weeks and spawned three Australian top ten singles, including "The City of Soul" which featured François' trademark funky bass techniques.

Parting company with Eurogliders in 1987, François formed the power pop trio Panic Poets, who released the independent single "Let's Go" in Australia in 1988, gaining good airplay.

In recent years, François has collaborated on several albums with West Australian percussionist Murray Campbell, as part of Campbell's Beatworld project. Now living in New South Wales, François is still very much involved in songwriting and production with local artists at his recording studio (Point Studio) on the Central Coast.
