= We Will Together =

Single by Eurogliders

from the album Absolutely!
- B-side: "Wild Life"
- Released: April 1985
- Studio: Rhinoceros Studios, Sydney
- Genre: Pop rock, Synth-pop
- Label: CBS
- Songwriter: Bernie Lynch
- Producer: Chris Porter

Eurogliders singles chronology
"Maybe Only I Dream" (1984)	"We Will Together" (1985)	"The City Of Soul" (1985)

"We Will Together" is a song by Eurogliders, released in April 1985 as the lead single from their third studio album, Absolutely! (1985). The song peaked at number 7 on the Australian Kent Music Report.

== Track listing ==
7" Single

- Side A "We Will Together"
- Side B "Wildlife" (live)

12" Single

- Side A "We Will Together" (The Mombassa Mix) - 5:46
- Side B "Someone" (The Euro Mix) - 4:42
- Side B "It's the Way" (The Work Mix) - 4 :28

== Chart performance ==
=== Weekly charts ===
Weekly chart performance for "We Will Together"
Chart (1985)	Peak position
Australia (Kent Music Report)	7

=== Year-end charts ===
Year-end chart performance for "We Will Together"
Chart (1985)	Position
Australia (Kent Music Report)	52
