= Heaven (Must Be There) =

Single by Eurogliders

from the album This Island
- B-side: "Heliograph"
- Released: May 1984
- Recorded: 1983
- Genre: Pop; new wave; dance-pop
- Length: 3:43
- Label: CBS
- Songwriters: Grace Knight; Bernie Lynch
- Producers: Nigel Gray; Bernie Lynch

Eurogliders singles chronology
"Another Day in the Big World" (1983)	"Heaven (Must Be There)" (1984)	"Maybe Only I Dream" (1984)

Official audio
- "Heaven (Must Be There)" on YouTube

"Heaven (Must Be There)" (sometimes titled simply "Heaven") is a song by the Australian pop and new wave band Eurogliders from their second studio album This Island (1984). The song was released on 7" and 12" vinyl in May 1984 by CBS Records.

The single brought the band to fame, especially in Australia, where it peaked at No. 2 on the Kent Music Report Singles Chart and became one of the Top 20 biggest-selling singles of 1984.

At the 1984 Countdown Music Awards the song won Best Australian Single.

== Track listing ==
1. "Heaven (Must Be There)
2. "Heliograph"
3. "No Action" (Dance Mix) (12" only)

== Chart performance ==
=== Weekly charts ===
Chart (1984–85)	Peak position
Australia (Kent Music Report)	2
New Zealand Singles Chart	6
Canada (RPM Singles Chart)	47
US Billboard Hot 100	65

=== Year-end charts ===
Chart (1984)	Position
Australia (Kent Music Report)	15

== In popular culture ==
"Heaven (Must Be There)" was used in an advertisement for REA Group on television in Australia starting on 30 June 2024 and is still running as of 10 February 2026.
