= Chilli Willi and the Red Hot Peppers =

British pub rock group (1971–1975)

- Origin: London, England
- Genre: Pub rock
- Years active: 1971–1975
- Labels: Revelation; Mooncrest; Proper; Last Music Co.
- Spinoff of: Mighty Baby
- Past members: Phil "Snakefinger" Lithman; Martin Stone; Paul "Dice Man" Bailey; Paul "Bassman" Riley; Pete Thomas

Chilli Willi and the Red Hot Peppers were one of the main British pub rock groups of the early 1970s. Later managed by Jake Riviera, who first worked for the band as a roadie, they reached their peak as part of the "Naughty Rhythms Tour" of 1975, along with other stalwarts of the same scene, Dr. Feelgood and Kokomo, each band alternately headlining on different dates.

== History ==
The band has its origins in a folk-rock duo formed by ex-Junior's Blues Band members Martin Stone and Philip C. Lithman. Lithman moved to San Mateo in 1971 to work with a precursor to The Residents, leaving Stone to play with Savoy Brown and Mighty Baby. The duo reunited in 1972 and recorded Kings of the Robot Rhythm that same year with vocalist Jo Ann Kelly and various members of Brinsley Schwarz. That same year, the duo expanded, adding Paul "Dice Man" Bailey, Paul "Bassman" Riley, and Pete Thomas to the line-up.

During the next two years, Chilli Willi & The Red Hot Peppers became a popular live act in Britain, and recorded two John Peel Sessions for BBC Radio 1, on 9 April 1973 and 25 July 1974. In 1974, they released their final album, Bongos Over Balham, which sold poorly; the band split in 1975.

After the band's breakup, Thomas became the drummer for Elvis Costello's backing band, The Attractions; Riley played with Graham Parker; Bailey joined Buster Crabbe (formerly Bontemps Roulez); and Stone played with the Pink Fairies, before concentrating on his book business but has since played with Wreckless Eric. Lithman moved to San Francisco where he began to work with the now fully formed Residents starting from their third album Fingerprince, under the name Snakefinger.

== Discography ==
=== Albums ===
- Kings of the Robot Rhythm (Revelation, 1972)
- Bongos Over Balham (Mooncrest, 1974)
- I'll Be Home (Proper, 1996) – compilation
- Real Sharp (The Last Music Company, 2017)

=== Live ===
- The Amazing ZigZag Concert (2010) Road Goes on Forever (RGF/ZZBOX1974) Disc 2 of 5-CD Box set also featuring Starry Eyed and Laughing, Help Yourself, John Stewart and Michael Nesmith

=== Singles ===
"Breathe a Little" (Mooncrest, 1975)

== Other sources ==
- Vladimir Bogdanov, Chris Woodstra, All Music Guide to Country: The Definitive Guide to Country Music – Page 143, 2003, Backbeat Books, ISBN 0-87930-760-9
- Peter Buckley, The Rough Guide to Rock – Page 465, 2003, Rough Guides, ISBN 1-84353-105-4
