= Grace Knight =

- Born: Grace Ethel Knight; 23 December 1955 (age 70); Manchester, England
- Genres: Indie pop; new wave; jazz
- Occupations: Musician; singer-songwriter
- Instrument: Vocals
- Years active: 1976–present
- Labels: CBS; Mercury; PolyGram; Universal; MGM; Sony; Columbia; Deluxe
- Website: graceknight.com.au

Grace Ethel Knight (born 23 December 1955) is an English-born Australian vocalist and songwriter. During the 1980s she was a mainstay of pop group Eurogliders which formed in Perth, Western Australia. Knight later became a solo jazz singer and musician based in Sydney. In 1984, Eurogliders released an Australian top ten album, This Island, which spawned their No. 2 hit single, "Heaven (Must Be There)". "Heaven" also peaked at No. 21 on the United States' Billboard Mainstream Rock charts and appeared on the Hot 100. The song, written by Eurogliders' guitarist and cofounder, Bernie Lynch, and vocals by Knight, was their only hit in United States. Knight and Lynch married in 1985 but separated soon after. Another Australian top ten album, Absolutely, followed for Eurogliders in 1985, which provided three further local top ten singles, "We Will Together", "The City of Soul" and "Can't Wait to See You".

Since Eurogliders disbanded in 1989, Knight has had a successful career as a jazz singer. Knight made a cameo appearance in the 1990 TV series Come in Spinner and sang on its soundtrack, Come in Spinner, recorded with jazz artist Vince Jones, which peaked at No. 4 on the Australian Recording Industry Association (ARIA) albums charts. This launched a new career for Knight, with her first solo album, Stormy Weather, which peaked at No. 16 in 1991. Other solo albums followed, Gracious in 1993, Live in 1996 and Zeitgeist in 2000. Eurogliders briefly reformed with Lynch and Knight in 2005 to release two additional albums by 2007. Knight returned to her solo career and released Willow in 2008.

== Life and career ==
Grace Knight was born in 1955 in Manchester, England. She performed as a cabaret singer in folk clubs from 1976. She competed in a semi-final of a national talent quest as a duo and consequently travelled to Dubai to perform, where she met Martha Reeves and the Vandellas. In 1977, she obtained a gig on a cruise ship to Perth, Western Australia, her set included covering Harry Nilsson's A Little Touch of Schmilsson in the Night and performed twice a night for six weeks.

=== Eurogliders (1980–1989) ===
Knight relocated to Perth, Western Australia, in 1977 where she performed in a number of local bands. She met guitarist and singer Bernie Lynch who fronted a new wave band, Rip Torn and the Stockings, in the late 1970s. They became domestic partners and together formed the band Living Single in 1980 with Crispin Akerman on guitar, Don Meharry on bass guitar, Guy Slingerland on drums and Amanda Vincent on keyboards. By 1981, drummer John Bennetts replaced Slingerland and the band changed their name to Eurogliders; domestically, Knight and Lynch had separated. Eurogliders' second album, This Island, was released in May 1984 and peaked at No. 4 on the Australian Kent Music Report albums chart. The single "Heaven (Must Be There)", written by Lynch and also released in May, reached No. 2 on the Australian singles charts, No. 65 on the US Billboard Hot 100 chart and No. 21 on its Mainstream Rock Tracks chart. The album peaked at No. 140 on the Billboard 200 chart.

At the height of the band's success, Knight and Lynch reconciled their relationship and were married in 1985 but the union was short-lived. Despite their marital separation, they stayed together in the band for another four years. In Australia, "Heaven" was followed by three more top 10 hits. Between 1984 and 1986, Eurogliders toured Australia, the US, Canada, Puerto Rico, Japan and New Zealand. Further albums followed, but late in 1989, the Eurogliders had a 'hiatus' due to Grace's new found Jazz success.

=== Solo career: 1990–present ===
After Eurogliders disbanded in 1989, Knight sang backing vocals in the Tania Bowra Band, and made a cameo appearance as Lola, a 1940s night club singer, in the 1990 Australian Broadcasting Corporation TV series Come in Spinner. She also sang on its soundtrack album, Vince Jones & Grace Knight: Come in Spinner, produced by Martin Armiger, recorded with jazz musician Vince Jones with arrangements and conducting by William Motzing and Derek Williams. The album earned double platinum sales and peaked at No. 4 on the Australian Recording Industry Association (ARIA) albums charts. It also won the 1991 ARIA Award for Best Adult Contemporary Album, and became the highest selling jazz album in Australian history with sales exceeding 230,000 copies. Come In Spinner included jazz standards with half the tracks having lead vocals by Jones, including a single, "I've Got You Under My Skin". Two singles with lead vocals by Knight were also released, "The Man I Love" and "Sophisticated Lady", and this started a new career for Knight as a jazz singer. Her first solo album, Stormy Weather, produced by Larry Muhoberac, was released in October 1991 and peaked at No. 16. Her debut solo single, "Fever", was released in September 1991 but did not peak into the top 50 singles charts. At the 1992 ARIA Music Awards, Stormy Weather was nominated for Best Adult Contemporary Album and Peter Cobbin was nominated for Engineer of the Year for his work on four of its tracks.

Knight's second solo album, Gracious, appeared in November 1993. It contained "big, brassy and busy arrangements of standards" and included work by 43 session musicians. This album also did not peak into the ARIA top 50, but was nominated for Best Adult Contemporary Album in 1994. Other solo albums followed, with Live in 1996 and Zeitgeist in 2000.

In November 2002, women of Marin County, California, spelled out the words "No War" with their nude bodies protesting against the proposed invasion of Iraq by a coalition which included Australian troops. This inspired Knight to organise a similar protest in a paddock outside her hometown of Federal near Byron Bay on 8 February 2003. Knight justified the protest:

These women came here today because they feel they are being lied to by our Government, and they feel their dissent is not being heard [...] We want to let John Howard know that we are not happy, and if it takes lying naked in a paddock to get the message across so be it.

— Grace Knight, 9 February 2003

Knight indicated that she had been writing lyrics for a forthcoming album with Lynch, when her frustration at the Howard Government's plans to invade Iraq interrupted her concentration. Knight rallied female friends via chain e-mails. Needing 67 women for the wording of "No War", ultimately 750 showed up.

Eurogliders reformed in October 2005 with Knight and Bernie Lynch using session musicians and released their fifth studio album. Simply called Eurogliders, the album did not peak into the ARIA top 50 charts. Eurogliders started touring again in April 2006 and performed on the Countdown Spectacular during June to August, which was a nostalgic tour of Australian bands from the 1970s and 1980s, as featured on the pop television show Countdown with its host Ian "Molly" Meldrum. The Eurogliders' sixth album, Blue Kiss, was recorded during the same sessions as the previous and was released in 2007 but also had no top 50 charting.

In 2008, Knight returned to her solo career and released Willow, which was nominated for Best Jazz Album at the 2008 ARIA Music Awards. On 17 July 2009, Knight performed at the Press Gallery Mid-Winter Ball attended by federal politicians, including Australian prime minister, Kevin Rudd, and Canberra journalists. Patrons of the function paid up to $20,000 each and raised $250,000 for various charities.

== Personal life ==
Knight's 1977 gig on a cruise ship from London was to visit her sister, who was living in Perth, Western Australia. Her sister introduced Knight to future bandmate, domestic partner and husband, Bernie Lynch. Knight separated from Lynch in 1986 and has been married two further times. She has a son (Jacky), born in 1987.

== Bibliography ==
- Knight, Grace (2010). Pink Suit for a Blue Day. Chatswood, NSW: New Holland Publishers. ISBN 978-1-92165-594-4.

== Discography ==
=== Albums ===
Name	Album details	Peak chart positions	Certification
Name	Album details	AUS	Certification
Come in Spinner (with Vince Jones)	Released: March 1990; Label: ABC Music (838984-2); Format: CD, LP, Cassette	4	ARIA: 3× Platinum
Stormy Weather	Released: September 1991; Label: Columbia (469029-2); Format: CD	16	ARIA: Platinum
Gracious	Released: November 1993; Label: Quality Dino Entertainment (DIN286D); Format: CD	90	
Grace Knight Live	Released: February 1996; Label: ABC Jazz (483582-2); Format: 2×CD; Live album, recorded in September 1995	—	
Zeitgeist: The Spirit of the Time	Released: July 2000; Label: 301/MGM Distribution (301001); Format: CD	—	
Willow	Released: April 2008; Label: ABC Jazz (4766306); Format: CD, digital download	—	
Keep Cool Fool	Released: April 2012; Label: ABC Jazz (2799478); Format: CD, digital download	—	
Fragile	Released: January 2016; Label: Grace Knight (GKM003); Format: CD, digital download	—	
Grace	Released: March 2018; Label: Grace Knight (GKM004); Format: CD, digital download	—	

=== Singles ===
Year	Title	Peak chart positions	Album
Year	Title	AUS	Album
1990	"The Man I Love"	—	Come in Spinner
1990	"Sophisticated Lady"	141	Come in Spinner
1991	"Fever"	64	Stormy Weather
1991	"Stormy Weather"	—	Stormy Weather
1991	"Drinking Again"	—	Stormy Weather
1993	"Ability to Swing"	—	Gracious
"—" denotes a recording that did not chart or was not released in that territory.

== Awards and nominations ==
=== ARIA Music Awards ===
The ARIA Music Awards is an annual awards ceremony that recognises excellence, innovation, and achievement across all genres of Australian music. Knight has been nominated for seven awards.

Year	Nominee / work	Award	Result
1991	Grace Knight	Best Female Artist	Nominated
1991	Come in Spinner (with Vince Jones)	Best Original Soundtrack, Cast or Show Album	Nominated
1991	Come in Spinner (with Vince Jones)	Best Adult Contemporary Album	Won
1992	Stormy Weather	Best Adult Contemporary Album	Nominated
1992	Peter Cobbin for Grace Knight's "Crazy", "Fever", "Stormy Weather" & "That Ole Devil Called Love"	Engineer of the Year	Nominated
1994	Gracious	Best Adult Contemporary Album	Nominated
2008	Willow	Best Jazz Album	Nominated
2012	Keep Cool Fool	Best Jazz Album	Nominated

=== Countdown Australian Music Awards ===
Countdown was an Australian pop music TV series on national broadcaster ABC-TV from 1974 to 1987, it presented music awards from 1979 to 1987, initially in conjunction with magazine TV Week. The TV Week / Countdown Awards were a combination of popular-voted and peer-voted awards.

Year	Nominee / work	Award	Result
1984	Grace Knight	Most Popular Female Performer	Nominated
1986	Grace Knight	Most Popular Female Performer	Nominated
