= Meat Loaf discography =

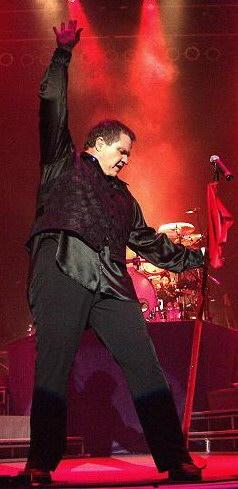
- Meat Loaf performing in 2004
- Studio albums: 12
- Extended plays: 1
- Live albums: 5
- Compilation albums: 7
- Singles: 39

American singer and actor Meat Loaf (1947–2022) released 12 studio albums, five live albums, seven compilation albums, one extended play and 39 singles. In a career that spanned six decades, he sold over 100 million records worldwide. According to Recording Industry Association of America, he sold 25 million certified records in the US alone.

Bat Out of Hell (1977) has sold 44 million copies worldwide, becoming the fourth best-selling album in history and is certified 14× platinum in the US. Bat Out of Hell has also sold 3.4 million copies in the UK, making it the UK's 14th best-selling album of all time. His biggest success after that came with Bat Out of Hell II: Back into Hell (1993), which has sold over 15 million copies worldwide. The album's lead single "I'd Do Anything for Love (But I Won't Do That)" was his biggest hit, reaching number one in 28 countries.

== Albums ==
=== Solo albums ===
List of albums, with selected chart positions and certifications
Title	Album details	Peak chart positions										Certifications
Title	Album details	US	AUS	GER	IRE	NL	NZ	NOR	SWE	SWI	UK	Certifications
Bat Out of Hell	Released: October 21, 1977; Label: Cleveland International / Epic	13	1	11	1	1	1	3	13	9	3	RIAA: Diamond (14× Platinum); ARIA: 26× Platinum; BPI: 11× Platinum; MC: 2× Diamond
Dead Ringer	Released: September 4, 1981; Label: Epic	45	5	8	—	10	2	10	1	—	1	ARIA: Gold; BPI: Platinum; MC: Gold
Midnight at the Lost and Found	Released: April 22, 1983; Label: Epic	—	84	26	—	—	—	7	21	—	7	BPI: Gold
Bad Attitude	Released: November 2, 1984; Label: Arista	74	42	24	—	—	—	—	36	—	8	BPI: Gold
Blind Before I Stop	Released: September 22, 1986; Label: Atlantic	—	—	51	—	—	—	—	36	21	28	BPI: Silver
Bat Out of Hell II: Back into Hell	Released: September 14, 1993; Label: MCA	1	1	1	1	1	1	2	1	1	1	RIAA: 5× Platinum; ARIA: 4× Platinum; BPI: 6× Platinum; MC: 9× Platinum; RMNZ: Gold
Welcome to the Neighbourhood	Released: October 30, 1995; Label: MCA	17	10	10	4	28	17	12	22	10	3	RIAA: Platinum; ARIA: Gold; BPI: Platinum; MC: Platinum
Couldn't Have Said It Better	Released: September 23, 2003; Label: Polydor	85	28	8	16	36	17	—	26	44	4	BPI: Gold
Bat Out of Hell III: The Monster Is Loose	Released: October 20, 2006; Label: Virgin, Mercury	8	9	2	16	7	5	6	10	3	3	RIAA: Gold; ARIA: Gold; BPI: Platinum; MC: Platinum
Hang Cool Teddy Bear	Released: April 19, 2010; Label: Mercury	27	16	4	28	23	5	16	21	4	4	BPI: Gold
Hell in a Handbasket	Released: September 30, 2011 (AUS/NZ) / December 2, 2011 (Germany) / February 2012 (UK/US); Label: Sony	100	20	29	51	62	39	—	—	49	5	
Braver Than We Are	Released: September 9, 2016 (EU) / September 19, 2016 (UK/US); Label: Caroline, 429	31	17	7	43	13	—	—	—	19	4	
"—" denotes album that did not chart or was not released

=== As Stoney & Meatloaf ===
List of albums, with selected chart positions and certifications
Title	Album details	Peak chart positions
Title	Album details	NL
Stoney & Meatloaf (with Shaun Murphy)	Released: October 1971; Label: Rare Earth	25

=== Live albums ===
List of albums, with selected chart positions and certifications
Title	Album details	Peak chart positions					Certifications
Title	Album details	US	AUS	GER	IRE	UK	Certifications
Live at Wembley	Released: October 26, 1987; Label: Arista	—	—	—	—	60	
Live from Hell and More Hell Hits	Released: 1994; Label: Arista	—	175	—	—	—	
Live Around the World	Released: November 1996; Label: MCA / Virgin	—	—	—	—	—	
VH1: Storytellers	Released: 1999; Label: Beyond	129	—	—	—	—	
Bat Out of Hell: Live with the Melbourne Symphony Orchestra	Released: September 2004; Label: Mercury	—	—	81	69	14	BPI: Gold
3 Bats Live	Released: October 2007; Label: Mercury	—	—	72	—	—	
Guilty Pleasure Tour - Live from Sydney, Australia	Released: October 2012; Label: Store For Music	—	—	—	—	177	
"—" denotes the album failed to chart or was not released in that country

=== Compilation albums ===
List of albums, with selected chart positions and certifications
Title	Album details	Peak chart positions									Certifications
Title	Album details	AUS	GER	IRE	NL	NZ	NOR	SWE	SWI	UK	Certifications
Hits Out of Hell	Released: 14 January 1985; Label: Cleveland International, Epic	139	53	2	—	10	—	—	—	2	BPI: 2× Platinum
The Big Ones	Released: August 1984 (Australia only); Label: J&B	14	—	—	—	—	—	—	—	—	
Rock 'N' Roll Hero	Released: 1987 (UK only); Label: Pickwick	—	—	—	—	—	—	—	—	—	
Prime Cuts	Released: 1989 (Europe only); Label: Arista	—	—	—	—	—	—	—	—	—	
Heaven & Hell (with Bonnie Tyler)	Released: 1989; Label: Columbia	43	—	28	—	—	—	—	83	84 (Note: Chart position from 1994 when it was allowed to chart in the artist albums chart (the Official Albums chart). This album also charted at number 9 in the compilations chart.)	BPI: Platinum
Paradise by the Dashboardlight (The Very Best of)	Released: February 1991; Label: Arcade	—	—	—	23	—	—	—	—	—	
Meat Loaf and Friends	Released: 1992 (Europe only); Label: Epic	—	—	—	—	—	—	—	—	—	BPI: Gold
Back from Hell! The Very Best of Meat Loaf	Released: 1993; Label: Columbia	—	5	—	—	—	3	—	6	—	
Back from Hell Again! − The Very Best of Meat Loaf Vol. 2	Released: August 1994; Label: Columbia	—	59	—	—	—	—	—	—	—	
Alive in Hell	Released: October 1994; Label: Pure Music	—	—	—	—	—	—	—	—	33	
Definitive Collection	Released: 1995 (Europe only); Label: Epic	—	—	—	—	—	—	—	—	—	
Heaven Can Wait – The Best Ballads of Meat Loaf Vol. 1	Released: January 1996; Label: Epic	—	30	—	—	—	—	—	—	—	BPI: Gold
The Very Best of Meat Loaf	Released: November 1998; Label: Virgin / Epic	116	5	14	29	22	—	39	24	14	RIAA: Gold; BPI: 2× Platinum
Heaven Can Wait – The Best of Meat Loaf	Released: March 2003; Label: EMI Gold	—	—	—	—	—	—	—	—	—	
Fallen Angel	Released: June 2003; Label: Epic	—	—	—	—	—	—	—	—	—	
Collections	Released: March 2008	134	—	—	—	—	—	—	—	—	
Piece of the Action: The Best of Meat Loaf	Released: 2009; Label: Camden / Sony BMG	101	—	80	—	—	—	—	—	56	BPI: Platinum
Hits Out of Hell	Re-release / Expanded Version; Released: June 2009; Label: Epic	—	—	41	—	—	—	—	—	10	BPI: Platinum
Essential	Released: September 2011	104	—	—	—	—	—	—	—	—	
Playlist: The Very Best of Meat Loaf	Released: October 9, 2012; Label: Epic	—	—	—	—	—	—	—	—	—	
"—" denotes the album failed to chart or was not released in that country

== Singles ==
Year	Single	Peak chart positions										Certifications	Album
Year	Single	US	AUS	BEL	CAN	GER	IRE	NL	NZ	SWI	UK	Certifications	Album
1971	"What You See Is What You Get" (Stoney & Meat Loaf)	71	—	—	—	—	—	—	—	—	—		Stoney & Meat Loaf
1971	"It Takes All Kinds of People" (Stoney & Meat Loaf)	—	—	—	—	—	—	—	—	—	—		Stoney & Meat Loaf
1977	"You Took the Words Right Out of My Mouth"	39	3	4	31	22	—	4	2	—	33	ARIA: Platinum; BPI: Gold; RMNZ: Platinum	Bat Out of Hell
1978	"Two Out of Three Ain't Bad"	11	11	—	5	—	25	—	9	—	32	RIAA: Platinum; BPI: Gold; RMNZ: Platinum	Bat Out of Hell
1978	"Bat Out of Hell"	—	26	—	—	—	—	—	—	—	15	ARIA: Platinum; BPI: Platinum; RMNZ: Platinum	Bat Out of Hell
1978	"Paradise by the Dashboard Light"	39	81	2	11	—	—	1	—	—	—	RIAA: Platinum; BPI: Platinum; RMNZ: Platinum	Bat Out of Hell
1978	"All Revved Up with No Place to Go"	—	—	—	—	—	—	—	—	—	—		Bat Out of Hell
1978	"Hot Patootie – Bless My Soul"	—	—	—	—	—	—	—	—	—	—		The Rocky Horror Picture Show
1981	"I'm Gonna Love Her for Both of Us"	84	92	—	41	—	—	—	40	—	62		Dead Ringer
1981	"Dead Ringer for Love" (with Cher)	—	65	33	—	—	2	32	—	—	5	BPI: Gold	Dead Ringer
1981	"Read 'Em and Weep"	—	—	—	—	—	—	—	—	—	—		Dead Ringer
1982	"Peel Out"	—	—	—	—	—	—	—	—	—	—		Dead Ringer
1983	"If You Really Want To"	—	—	—	—	—	—	—	—	—	59		Midnight at the Lost and Found
1983	"Razor's Edge"	—	—	—	—	—	—	—	—	—	41		Midnight at the Lost and Found
1983	"Midnight at the Lost and Found"	—	—	—	—	—	21	—	—	—	17		Midnight at the Lost and Found
1984	"Modern Girl"	—	—	—	—	30	16	—	—	—	17		Bad Attitude
1984	"Nowhere Fast"	—	—	—	—	—	—	—	—	—	67		Bad Attitude
1985	"Piece of the Action"	—	98	—	—	—	—	—	—	—	47		Bad Attitude
1985	"Surf's Up"	—	—	—	—	—	—	—	—	—	—		Bad Attitude
1986	"Rock 'n' Roll Mercenaries" (with John Parr)	—	—	—	—	—	—	—	—	—	31		Blind Before I Stop
1986	"Getting Away with Murder"	—	—	—	—	—	—	—	—	—	—		Blind Before I Stop
1987	"Blind Before I Stop"	—	—	—	—	—	—	—	—	—	89		Blind Before I Stop
1987	"Special Girl"	—	—	—	—	—	—	—	—	—	81		Blind Before I Stop
1987	"Bat Out of Hell" [live]	—	—	—	—	—	—	—	—	—	—		Live at Wembley
1987	"A Time for Heroes" (with Brian May)	—	—	—	—	—	—	—	—	—	—		Non-album singles
1988	"Paradise by the Dashboard Light" (with Ellen Foley) [re-release]	—	—	—	—	—	—	3	—	—	—		Non-album singles
1991	"Dead Ringer for Love" [re-release]	—	—	—	—	—	28	—	—	—	53		Bat Out of Hell: Re-Vamped
1992	"Two Out of Three Ain't Bad" [re-release]	—	—	—	—	—	25	—	—	—	69		Bat Out of Hell: Re-Vamped
1993	"Bat Out of Hell" [re-release]	—	79	—	—	—	16	—	—	—	8		Bat Out of Hell: Re-Vamped
1993	"Paradise by the Dashboard Light" (with Ellen Foley) [re-release]	—	—	—	—	—	—	25	—	—	—		Bat Out of Hell: Re-Vamped
1993	"I'd Do Anything for Love (But I Won't Do That)"(featuring Lorraine Crosby)	1	1	1	1	1	1	1	1	1	1	RIAA: Platinum; ARIA: 2× Platinum; BPI: Platinum; RMNZ: 2× Platinum	Bat Out of Hell II: Back into Hell
1994	"Rock and Roll Dreams Come Through"	13	18	23	4	26	19	26	6	—	11		Bat Out of Hell II: Back into Hell
1994	"Objects in the Rear View Mirror May Appear Closer than They Are"	38	52	—	26	90	—	—	32	—	26		Bat Out of Hell II: Back into Hell
1995	"I'd Lie for You (And That's the Truth)" (with Patti Russo)	13	7	10	11	17	4	9	14	24	2	RIAA: Gold; BPI: Silver	Welcome to the Neighbourhood
1996	"Not a Dry Eye in the House"	82	111	—	—	93	23	—	—	—	7		Welcome to the Neighbourhood
1996	"Runnin' for the Red Light (I Gotta Life)"	—	151	—	—	—	—	—	—	—	21		Welcome to the Neighbourhood
1998	"A Kiss Is a Terrible Thing to Waste" (featuring Bonnie Tyler)	—	—	—	—	—	—	—	—	—	—		The Very Best of Meat Loaf
1999	"Is Nothing Sacred" (with Patti Russo)	—	—	—	—	—	—	—	—	—	15		VH1: Storytellers (duet), Welcome to the Neighbourhood (solo)
2003	"Did I Say That?"	—	—	—	—	18	—	—	—	56	—		Couldn't Have Said It Better
2003	"Couldn't Have Said It Better" (with Patti Russo)	—	—	—	—	80	—	43	—	—	31		Couldn't Have Said It Better
2003	"Man of Steel" (with Pearl Aday)	—	—	—	—	—	—	—	—	—	21		Couldn't Have Said It Better
2006	"It's All Coming Back to Me Now" (with Marion Raven)	—	—	—	—	7	34	15	—	21	6	BPI: Silver	Bat Out of Hell III: The Monster Is Loose
2006	"Blind As a Bat"	—	—	—	—	—	—	—	—	—	—		Bat Out of Hell III: The Monster Is Loose
2007	"Cry Over Me"	—	—	—	—	—	—	—	—	—	47		Bat Out of Hell III: The Monster Is Loose
2010	"Los Angeloser"	—	—	—	—	—	—	—	—	—	—		Hang Cool Teddy Bear
2010	"If I Can't Have You"	—	—	—	—	—	—	—	—	—	—		Hang Cool Teddy Bear
2010	"Peace on Earth"	—	—	—	—	—	—	—	—	—	—		Hang Cool Teddy Bear
2011	"All of Me"	—	—	—	—	—	—	—	—	—	—		Hell in a Handbasket
2016	"Going All the Way" (with Ellen Foley and Karla DeVito)	—	—	—	—	—	—	—	—	—	—		Braver Than We Are
2016	"Speaking in Tongues"	—	—	—	—	—	—	—	—	—	—		Braver Than We Are
"—" denotes the single failed to chart or was not released in that country

== Video ==
Title	Year	Certifications
Hits Out of Hell	1985	BPI: Platinum
Bad Attitude – Live!	1985	
Live	1986	
Bat Out of Hell II: Picture Show	1994	BPI: Gold
VH1: Storytellers	1999	BPI: Gold
Bat Out of Hell: Live with the Melbourne Symphony Orchestra	2004	BPI: Platinum
3 Bats Live DVD and Blu-ray (UK only)	2007	BPI: Gold
Bat Out of Hell: The Original Tour	2009	
Guilty Pleasure Tour, Live in Sydney	2012	

== Guest appearances ==
- 1974: The Rocky Horror Show (Starring Tim Curry And The Original Roxy Cast): "What Ever Happened to Saturday Night", "Eddie's Teddy"
- 1975: The Rocky Horror Picture Show Soundtrack: "Hot Patootie"
- 1976: Free-for-All: "Writing on the Wall", "Street Rats", "Together", "Hammerdown", "I Love You So I Told You a Lie"
- 1994: The Glory of Gershwin: "Somebody Loves Me"
- 1998: Chef Aid: The South Park Album: "Tonight is Right for Love"
- 2006: The Pick of Destiny: "Kickapoo"
