= Piece of the Action: The Best of Meat Loaf =

Greatest hits album by Meat Loaf
- Released: March 2, 2009
- Genre: Rock
- Length: 2:30:37
- Label: Camden; Sony BMG

Meat Loaf chronology
Collections (2008)	Piece of the Action: The Best of Meat Loaf (2009)	Hang Cool Teddy Bear (2010)

Piece of the Action: The Best of Meat Loaf is a compilation album by the American musician Meat Loaf that was released on March 2, 2009 by Camden and Sony BMG.

== Reception ==
Professional ratings
Review scores
Source	Rating
AllMusic	4/5 stars

James Christopher Monger of AllMusic stated that it "would be the perfect vehicle to showcase Marvin Lee Aday's three decades worth of material", Monger went on to comment that the album "narrows its focus on his years with BMG and Sony, which means that anyone looking for recent hits like "I'd Do Anything for Love (But I Won't Do That)" is out of luck." and called the album a "worthy addition to the myriad reissue of his 1977 classic Bat Out of Hell".

== Track listing ==
Disc one
No.	Title	Original album	Length
1.	"Bat Out of Hell"	Bat Out of Hell (1977)	9:48
2.	"You Took the Words Right Out of My Mouth (Hot Summer Night)"	Bat Out of Hell (1977)	4:14
3.	"Two Out of Three Ain't Bad"	Bat Out of Hell (1977)	5:23
4.	"Paradise by the Dashboard Light"	Bat Out of Hell (1977)	8:28
5.	"Dead Ringer for Love"	Dead Ringer (1981)	4:20
6.	"Modern Girl"	Bad Attitude (1984)	4:24
7.	"I'm Gonna Love Her for Both of Us"	Dead Ringer (1981)	7:09
8.	"Read 'Em and Weep"	Dead Ringer (1981)	5:25
9.	"Peel Out"	Dead Ringer (1981)	6:30
10.	"Midnight at the Lost and Found"	Midnight at the Lost and Found (1983)	3:29
11.	"If You Really Want To"	Midnight at the Lost and Found (1983)	3:38
12.	"Razor's Edge"	Midnight at the Lost and Found (1983)	4:07
13.	"Sailor to a Siren"	Bad Attitude (1984)	4:40
14.	"Blind Before I Stop"	Blind Before I Stop (1986)	3:33
Total length:			1:15:18

Disc two
No.	Title	Original album	Length
1.	"Piece of the Action"	Bad Attitude (1984)	4:15
2.	"Rock 'n' Roll Mercenaries"	Blind Before I Stop (1986)	4:58
3.	"I'll Kill You if You Don't Come Back"	Dead Ringer (1981)	6:24
4.	"Special Girl"	Blind Before I Stop (1986)	3:54
5.	"Heaven Can Wait"	Bat Out of Hell (1977)	4:38
6.	"All Revved Up with No Place to Go"	Bat Out of Hell (1977)	4:19
7.	"More Than You Deserve"	Dead Ringer (1981)	7:02
8.	"Everything Is Permitted"	Dead Ringer (1981)	4:41
9.	"For Crying Out Loud"	Bat Out of Hell (1977)	8:46
10.	"The Promised Land"	Midnight at the Lost and Found (1983)	2:44
11.	"Bad Attitude"	Bad Attitude (1984)	4:44
12.	"Wolf at Your Door"	Midnight at the Lost and Found (1983)	4:05
13.	"You Can Never Be Too Sure About the Girl"	Midnight at the Lost and Found (1983)	4:28
14.	"Don't Leave Your Mark on Me"	Bad Attitude (1984)	4:07
15.	"One More Kiss (Night of the Soft Parade)"	Blind Before I Stop (1986)	5:40
16.	"I Love You So I Told You a Lie"	Free-for-All (1976)	3:47
Total length:			2:30:37

== Charts ==
Chart (2009–2010)	Peak position
Australian Albums (ARIA)	101
Irish Albums (IRMA)	80
Scottish Albums (OCC)	39
UK Albums (OCC)	56

== Certifications ==
Region	Certification	Certified units/sales
United Kingdom (BPI) 2013 release	Platinum	300,000^{*}
^{*} Sales figures based on certification alone.
