= Heaven & Hell (Meat Loaf and Bonnie Tyler album) =

Compilation album by Meat Loaf and Bonnie Tyler
- Released: 1989
- Recorded: 1971–1986
- Genre: Pop rock
- Length: 61:42
- Label: Telstar; Columbia; Sony

Meat Loaf chronology
Live at Wembley (1987)	Heaven & Hell (1989)	Bat Out of Hell II: Back into Hell (1993)

Bonnie Tyler chronology
Hide Your Heart (1988)	Heaven & Hell (1989)	Bitterblue (1991)

Alternative cover
- 1993 reissue album cover

Heaven & Hell is a compilation album by American singer Meat Loaf and Welsh singer Bonnie Tyler. It was originally released in 1989 by Telstar Records and reissued in 1993 by Columbia Records. The majority of songs included on Heaven & Hell were written by Jim Steinman, who wrote some of Meat Loaf and Tyler's biggest hits.

Though the album was not an immediate commercial success, due to steady sales Heaven & Hell was certified platinum by the BPI in 2013.

== Background ==
Heaven & Hell was first released in 1989 by Telstar following a deal with Epic. It contains fourteen tracks, with selections from Bat Out of Hell, Dead Ringer, Blind Before I Stop and Bad Attitude by Meat Loaf, and Faster Than the Speed of Night and Secret Dreams and Forbidden Fire by Bonnie Tyler. Ten of the compilation's tracks were written by Jim Steinman. The original cover art for Heaven & Hell features two mirrored photographs of Meat Loaf and Tyler performing on stage. In 1993, Columbia reissued the compilation with new cover art and an altered track listing.

In 2011, Sony released another CD pressing of Heaven & Hell as part of their "Girls Night In X" reissue campaign.

== Critical reception ==
Thom Jurek of AllMusic described the compilation as "a rather pointless collection of tunes", only that it was "a good idea at the time". He described Steinman's songs as "brilliantly composed" and Meat Loaf's vocals as "wonderfully sung".

== Track listing ==
Heaven & Hell — Original version
No.	Title	Writer(s)	Original album	Length
1.	"Dead Ringer for Love" (with Cher)	Jim Steinman	Dead Ringer	4:26
2.	"Holding Out for a Hero"	Steinman; Dean Pitchford	Footloose: Original Soundtrack of the Paramount Motion Picture	4:23
3.	"You Took the Words Right Out of My Mouth"	Steinman	Bat Out of Hell	4:13
4.	"Faster Than the Speed of Night"	Steinman	Faster Than the Speed of Night	4:41
5.	"Have You Ever Seen the Rain?"	John Fogerty	Faster Than the Speed of Night	3:48
6.	"Two Out of Three Ain't Bad"	Steinman	Bat Out of Hell	3:57
7.	"Total Eclipse of the Heart"	Steinman	Faster Than the Speed of Night	4:32
8.	"Bat Out of Hell"	Steinman	Bat Out of Hell	4:55
9.	"Straight from the Heart"	Bryan Adams; Eric Kagna	Faster Than the Speed of Night	3:40
10.	"Read 'Em and Weep"	Steinman	Dead Ringer	3:48
11.	"Loving You's a Dirty Job (But Somebody's Gotta Do It)" (with Todd Rundgren)	Steinman	Secret Dreams and Forbidden Fire	4:12
12.	"Rock 'n' Roll Mercenaries" (with John Parr)	Al Hodge; Michael Dan Ehmig	Blind Before I Stop	4:56
13.	"If You Were a Woman (And I Was a Man)"	Desmond Child	Secret Dreams and Forbidden Fire	3:59
14.	"Modern Girl"	Paul Jacobs; Sarah Durkee	Bad Attitude	4:25

Heaven & Hell — 1993 reissue
No.	Title	Writer(s)	Original album	Length
1.	"Bat Out of Hell"	Jim Steinman	Bat Out of Hell	4:55
2.	"Faster Than the Speed of Night"	Steinman	Faster Than the Speed of Night	4:42
3.	"You Took the Words Right Out of My Mouth"	Steinman	Bat Out of Hell	5:05
4.	"Have You Ever Seen the Rain?"	John Fogerty	Faster Than the Speed of Night	4:08
5.	"Read 'Em and Weep"	Steinman	Dead Ringer	3:48
6.	"Total Eclipse of the Heart"	Steinman	Faster Than the Speed of Night	4:31
7.	"Two Out of Three Ain't Bad"	Steinman	Bat Out of Hell	4:50
8.	"Holding Out for a Hero"	Steinman; Dean Pitchford	Secret Dreams and Forbidden Fire	3:31
9.	"Dead Ringer for Love" (with Cher)	Steinman	Dead Ringer	4:23
10.	"If You Were a Woman (And I Was a Man)"	Desmond Child	Secret Dreams and Forbidden Fire	4:02
11.	"If You Really Want To"	George Meyer; Ted Neeley	Midnight at the Lost and Found	3:39
12.	"Straight from the Heart"	Bryan Adams; Eric Kanga	Faster Than the Speed of Night	3:43
13.	"Loving You's a Dirty Job but Somebody's Gotta Do It" (with Todd Rundgren)	Steinman	Secret Dreams and Forbidden Fire	5:50
14.	"Heaven Can Wait"	Steinman	Bat Out of Hell	4:41

== Charts ==
Chart (1990)	Peak position
Australian Albums (ARIA)	43

Chart (1994)	Peak position
UK Albums (OCC)	84

Chart (2013)	Peak position
Irish Albums	32

Chart (2022)	Peak position
German Downloads (Offizielle Download Top 100)	25
Irish Compilations Chart (OCC)	3
Swiss Albums (Schweizer Hitparade)	83
UK Album Downloads (OCC)	17
UK Compilation Chart (OCC)	34

== Certifications ==
Region	Certification	Certified units/sales
United Kingdom (BPI)	Platinum	300,000^{*}
^{*} Sales figures based on certification alone.

== Release history ==
Country	Date	Version	Format(s)	Label	Ref.
United Kingdom	1989	Original	Cassette	Telstar	
Europe	5 May 1993		CD	Columbia	
Europe	1994		CD	Epic	
Europe	2004		Digital download	Columbia	
