= Hits Out of Hell =

1985 compilation album by Meat Loaf

Compilation album by Meat Loaf
- Released: January 14, 1985
- Recorded: 1977, 1981, 1983, 1984
- Genre: Rock
- Length: 58:15
- Label: Cleveland International Records, Epic Records
- Producer: Steve Popovitch, Sam Lederman, Stan Snyder

Meat Loaf chronology
Bad Attitude (1984)	Hits Out of Hell (1985)	Blind Before I Stop (1986)

Hits Out of Hell is a 1985 compilation album by Meat Loaf. It comprises seven Jim Steinman songs. The original release also contained the hit "Modern Girl" from Bad Attitude, which came out at about the same time.

Meat Loaf never liked that he never had any say in these compilations and numerous others soon followed in Hits out of Hell's footsteps. The Australian edition of the album is the only CD release of the song "Love's Labors Lost", which was originally the b-side to "If You Really Want To" from the album Midnight at the Lost and Found. The album was rereleased and expanded in 2009 by Epic Records, adding the tracks "I'd Do Anything for Love (But I Won't Do That)" (from Bat Out of Hell II: Back into Hell) and "I'd Lie for You (And That's the Truth)" (from Welcome to the Neighbourhood). "Love's Labors Lost" was not included.

== Track listing ==
=== Original release ===
1. "Bat Out of Hell" (Jim Steinman) - 9:48
2. "Read 'Em and Weep" (Steinman) - 5:25
3. "Midnight at the Lost and Found" (Meat Loaf/Steve Buslowe/Paul Christie/Dan Peyronel) - 3:31
4. "Two Out of Three Ain't Bad" (Steinman) - 5:23
5. "Dead Ringer for Love" (Steinman) - 4:21
6. "Modern Girl" (Paul Jacobs/Sarah Durkee) – 4:24
7. "I'm Gonna Love Her for Both of Us" (Steinman) - 7:09
8. "You Took the Words Right Out of My Mouth (Hot Summer Night)" (Steinman) – 5:04
9. "Razor's Edge" (Meat Loaf/Buslowe/Christie/Mark Doyle)- 4:07
10. "Paradise by the Dashboard Light" (Steinman) – 8:28
  I. "Paradise"
  II. "Let Me Sleep on It"
  III. "Praying for the End of Time"
11. "Lost Love" (Buslowe/Meat Loaf) - 3:37 *(Australian release only)

=== Current release ===
1. "Bat Out of Hell" (Jim Steinman) - 9:48
2. "Read 'Em and Weep" (Steinman) - 5:25
3. "Midnight at the Lost and Found" (Meat Loaf/Steve Buslowe/Paul Christie/Dan Peyronel) - 3:31
4. "Two Out of Three Ain't Bad" (Steinman) - 5:23
5. "Dead Ringer for Love" (Steinman) - 4:21
6. "All Revved Up with No Place to Go" (Steinman) – 4:20
7. "I'm Gonna Love Her for Both of Us" (Steinman) - 7:09
8. "You Took the Words Right Out of My Mouth (Hot Summer Night)" (Steinman) – 5:04
9. "Razor's Edge" (Meat Loaf/Buslowe/Christie/Mark Doyle)- 4:07
10. "Paradise by the Dashboard Light" (Steinman) – 8:28

=== 2009 Epic Records expanded edition ===
1. "Bat Out of Hell" (Jim Steinman) - 9:48
2. "Read 'Em and Weep" (Steinman) - 5:23
3. "Midnight at the Lost and Found" (Meat Loaf/Steve Buslowe/Paul Christie/Dan Peyronel) - 3:30
4. "Two Out of Three Ain't Bad" (Steinman) - 5:22
5. "Dead Ringer for Love" (Steinman) - 4:22
6. "Modern Girl" (Paul Jacobs/Sarah Durkee) - 4:22
7. "I'm Gonna Love Her for Both of Us" (Steinman) - 7:07
8. "You Took the Words Right Out of My Mouth (Hot Summer Night)" (Steinman) – 4:11
9. "Razor's Edge" (Meat Loaf/Buslowe/Christie/Mark Doyle)- 4:07
10. "Paradise by the Dashboard Light" (Steinman) – 8:29
11. "I'd Do Anything for Love (But I Won't Do That)" (Steinman) - 5:25
12. "I'd Lie for You (And That's the Truth)" (Diane Warren) - 6:30

== Charts ==
=== Weekly charts ===
Initial chart performance for Hits Out of Hell
Chart (1985–93)	Peak position
Australian Albums (ARIA)	139
German Albums (Offizielle Top 100)	53
New Zealand Albums (RMNZ)	10
UK Albums (OCC)	2

Weekly chart performance for Hits Out of Hell upon Meat Loaf's death
Chart (2022)	Peak position
Irish Albums (OCC)	2

=== Year-end charts ===
1993 year-end chart performance for Hits Out of Hell
Chart (1993)	Peak position
UK Albums (OCC)	91

== Certifications ==
Certifications and sales for Hits Out of Hell
Region	Certification	Certified units/sales
Netherlands (NVPI)	Gold	50,000^{^}
United Kingdom (BPI)	2× Platinum	600,000^{‡}
^{^} Shipments figures based on certification alone.^{‡} Sales+streaming figures based on certification alone.

== Video release ==
Hits Out of Hell

Video by Meat Loaf
- Released: 1985
- Genre: Rock

Meat Loaf chronology
Live (1981)	Hits Out of Hell (1985)	Bad Attitude - Live! (1985)

Hits Out of Hell had a collection of Meat Loaf's music Videos of the late 1970s and 1980s, which came out simultaneously with the album release.

=== Tracks ===
1. "Bat Out of Hell"
2. "Read 'Em and Weep"
3. "Two Out of Three Ain't Bad"
4. "Razor's Edge"
5. "More than You Deserve"
6. "I'm Gonna Love Her for Both of Us"
7. "If You Really Want To"
8. "You Took the Words Right Out of My Mouth (Hot Summer Night)"
9. "Paradise by the Dashboard Light"

=== Missing video ===
A VHS version of Hits Out of Hell was later released in the United Kingdom and included the music video for "Dead Ringer for Love". This was only edited into the United States version when it was released with Bat Out of Hell as a special edition.

=== Reedits ===
In the original video for "Paradise by the Dashboard Light" as released to television and in 35mm prints, the male/female "Hot Summer Night" prologue from "You Took the Words Right Out of My Mouth" was spoken live by Jim Steinman and Karla DeVito before the song performance. On this compilation, the prologue was removed and spliced in front of the video for "You Took the Words Right Out of My Mouth", ostensibly to properly replicate the album Bat Out of Hell, and the video for "Paradise by the Dashboard Light" goes right into the performance.

The video was reissued on DVD in 2000 as a stand along DVD and again in 2006 as a second disc with Bat Out Of Hell: Special Edition. These editions included Dolby Digital 5.1 Surround Sound and PCM Stereo audio options for the video content as well as a Biography and a Discography in the menu options.

=== Certifications ===
Video certifications and sales for Hits Out of Hell
Region	Certification	Certified units/sales
Australia (ARIA)	8× Platinum	560,000^{^}
United Kingdom (BPI)	Platinum	50,000^{*}
^{*} Sales figures based on certification alone.^{^} Shipments figures based on certification alone.
