= In Europe =

In Europe may refer to:

- In Europe (Thad Jones Mel Lewis Orchestra album), a live recording from two 1978 concerts in Poland and Germany
- In Europe (Jack Walrath album), a 1982 album recorded in Copenhagen
- In Europe (Elvin Jones album), a 1991 album recorded live in Germany
- In Europe '82, a four-track EP by the American musician Meat Loaf

== See also ==
- Live in Europe (disambiguation)
- In Europa (disambiguation)
