= In Europe '82 =

EP by Meat Loaf
- Released: April 1982
- Recorded: 1975–1981
- Genre: Rock
- Label: Epic
- Producers: Jim Steinman, Todd Rundgren, Jimmy Iovine, Stephan Galfas, Meat Loaf

Meat Loaf chronology
Peel Out (1982)	In Europe '82 (1982)	If You Really Want To (1983)

In Europe '82 is a four-track EP by the American musician Meat Loaf released in Europe in April 1982. It consists of four of Meat Loaf's thus far hit singles; "Two Out of Three Ain't Bad", "You Took the Words Right Out of My Mouth", "I'm Gonna Love Her for Both of Us" and "Dead Ringer for Love". The EP was released by Epic as a collector's item exclusively for the European market. The version released in Ireland was the most exclusive as it was a pressing in clear vinyl. That version was also the most successful as it reached #3 on the Irish Singles Chart during a ten-week chart run.

== Track listing ==
1. "Two Out of Three Ain't Bad"
2. "You Took the Words Right Out of My Mouth"
3. "I'm Gonna Love Her for Both of Us"
4. "Dead Ringer for Love"

All tracks written by Jim Steinman.

== Charts ==
Chart (1982)	Peak position
Irish Singles Chart	3
