= Welcome to the Neighbourhood (Meat Loaf album) =

Studio album by Meat Loaf
- Released: October 30, 1995; November 7, 1995 (US)
- Recorded: April–August 1995
- Genres: Hard rock; heavy metal
- Length: 58:56
- Labels: Virgin; MCA (US)
- Producers: Ron Nevison; Sammy Hagar; Steven Van Zandt; Meat Loaf

Meat Loaf chronology
Bat Out of Hell II: Back into Hell (1993)	Welcome to the Neighbourhood (1995)	Couldn't Have Said It Better (2003)

Singles from Welcome to the Neighbourhood
- 1. "I'd Lie for You (And That's the Truth)" Released: October 3, 1995; 2. "Not a Dry Eye in the House" Released: January 15, 1996; 3. "Runnin' for the Red Light (I Gotta Life)" Released: April 15, 1996

Professional ratings
Review scores
Source	Rating
AllMusic	3/5 stars
Cash Box	(favorable)
NME	4/10
The Rolling Stone Album Guide	1.5/5 stars
Q	3/5 stars

Welcome to the Neighbourhood is the seventh studio album by American rock singer Meat Loaf, released on October 30, 1995 as the follow-up to his successful comeback album Bat Out of Hell II: Back into Hell. It went platinum in the United States and United Kingdom.

The album is thought of as a concept album, as all of the songs are ordered in the track listing as to tell a story about a relationship throughout the years. Three singles were released: "I'd Lie for You (And That's the Truth)" (a duet with Patti Russo), "Not a Dry Eye in the House" and "Runnin' for the Red Light (I Gotta Life)". They reached #2, #7 and #21 in the UK charts, with the first two written by Diane Warren, who later also wrote songs for Meat Loaf's albums Couldn't Have Said It Better and Bat Out of Hell III: The Monster Is Loose. In some markets, radio stations also played "Amnesty Is Granted", though it was not released as an official single. Despite the chart success of the album and its singles, only "Amnesty Is Granted" has appeared on an official live album, Casa De Carne (Live 2008) as a bonus CD with Hang Cool Teddy Bear. "I'd Lie for You (And That's the Truth)" was recorded as a sound check with the Melbourne Symphony Orchestra, but only included as a bonus download track.

Of the 12 songs on the album, two are covers of songs from Jim Steinman projects; "Original Sin" first appeared on Pandora's Box's Original Sin album (it was also heard in the film The Shadow, where it was performed by Taylor Dayne), and "Left in the Dark" first appeared on Steinman's own album Bad for Good. Another cover on the album is "Martha" originally by Tom Waits, from his 1973 debut album Closing Time.

== Cover art ==
The theme on the cover art and inside booklet is that of detective novels of the 1950s. The booklet, aside from having the lyrics for every song, features a "Detective Novel" per song with modified titles to accommodate the titles of the songs. At least one image, the one associated with "Where Angels Sing" (the final track on the album), is easily recognizable: it is the same image, only with slightly altered colors, as in the movie poster for Lolita, Stanley Kubrick's film adaption of the controversial same-titled novel by Vladimir Nabokov; the typeface used to write "Where Angels Sing" is also the same one as in the poster. This style was also used for the three singles released off the album, with the cover art for each of them being its correspondent novel from the booklet.

== Track listing ==
No.	Title	Writer(s)	Length
1.	"Where the Rubber Meets the Road"	Sarah Durkee, Paul Jacobs	4:57
2.	"I'd Lie for You (And That's the Truth)" (Duet with Patti Russo)	Diane Warren	6:41
3.	"Original Sin"	Jim Steinman	5:56
4.	"45 Seconds of Ecstasy"	Martha Minter Bailey	1:06
5.	"Runnin' for the Red Light (I Gotta Life)"	Durkee, Meat Loaf, Patti Russo, Harry Vanda, George Young	3:59
6.	"Fiesta de las Almas Perdidas"	Jeff Bova	1:27
7.	"Left in the Dark"	Steinman	7:13
8.	"Not a Dry Eye in the House"	Warren	5:54
9.	"Amnesty Is Granted"	Sammy Hagar	6:09
10.	"If This Is the Last Kiss (Let's Make It Last All Night)" (Duet with Patti Russo)	Warren	4:34
11.	"Martha"	Tom Waits	4:40
12.	"Where Angels Sing"	Stephen Allen Davis	6:09

== Collector's edition ==
In 2011, a three disc collector's edition was released. The first disc includes the songs on the original release with four additional tracks.

No.	Title	Writer(s)	From single	Length
13.	"Come Together"	Lennon–McCartney	Not a Dry Eye in the House	3:20
14.	"Let It Be"	Lennon–McCartney	Not a Dry Eye in the House	4:33
15.	"Oh, What a Beautiful Mornin'"	Richard Rodgers, Oscar Hammerstein II	I'd Lie for You (And That's the Truth)	3:05
16.	"Is Nothing Sacred" (Duet with Patti Russo)	Steinman, Don Black	Is Nothing Sacred	5:37

The second disc was recorded live at the Beacon Theatre on 23 October 1995, except tracks 10 and 11 (recorded in 1989). Track 9 is, by mistake, the studio track.

No.	Title	Writer(s)	Length
1.	"Life Is a Lemon and I Want My Money Back"	Steinman	7:59
2.	"Where the Rubber Meets the Road"	Durkee, Jacobs	5:42
3.	"I'd Lie for You (And That's the Truth)"	Warren	7:26
4.	"Amnesty is Granted"	Hagar	5:54
5.	"You Took the Words Right Out of My Mouth"	Steinman	9:13
6.	"All Revved Up with No Place to Go"	Steinman	6:48
7.	"Dead Ringer for Love"	Steinman	4:29
8.	"I'd Do Anything for Love (But I Won't Do That)"	Steinman	5:28
9.	"Runnin' for the Red Light (I Gotta Life)"	Vanda, Young, Russo, Durkee, Meat Loaf	4:01
10.	"Midnight at the Lost and Found"	Steve Buslowe, Paul Christie, Meat Loaf, Danny Peyronel	5:07
11.	"Whatever Happened To Saturday Night" (Recorded in Tallahassee, Florida)	Richard O'Brien	3:19
12.	"Bat Out of Hell"	Steinman	11:58

The third disc is a five track DVD.

No.	Title	Length
1.	"I'd Lie for You (And That's the Truth)" (Promo video)
2.	"Not a Dry Eye in the House" (Promo video)
3.	"I'd Lie for You (And That's the Truth)" (BBC TV Top of the Pops Appearance 12-Oct-1995)
4.	"Not a Dry Eye in the House" (BBC Top of the Pops 1-Feb-1996)
5.	"Interview" (Meat Loaf discusses the making of Welcome to the Neighbourhood)
Total length:		47:02

== Personnel ==
=== Arrangements ===
- Rory Dodd, Kasim Sulton – background vocal arrangers

=== Band ===
- Meat Loaf – lead vocals

==== The Neverland Express ====
- Pat Thrall – guitars (2–5, 7, 8, 10, 12)
- Kasim Sulton – acoustic guitars (8), backing vocals
- Steve Buslowe – bass guitar
- Mark Alexander – piano (2–5, 7–12)
- John Miceli – drums (12)
- Patti Russo – female lead vocals (2, 10)
- Pearl Aday – backing vocals (1, 2, 5)

==== Regular Meat Loaf studio sidemen ====
- Tim Pierce – guitars (1–3, 5, 7–10, 12)
- Eddie Martinez – guitars (9)
- Paul Jacobs – piano (1)
- Jeff Bova – keyboards, Hammond B3 (2, 4), programming (6)
- Kenny Aronoff – drums
- Rory Dodd – backing vocals
- Curtis King – backing vocals (1, 2, 7–10, 12)

==== Special appearances ====
- Sammy Hagar – additional vocals and guitars (9)
- Steven Van Zandt – guitars (9)
- Susan Wood – female lead vocals (4)
- Elaine Caswell – backing vocals (3, 5)

== Charts ==
=== Weekly charts ===
Weekly chart performance for Welcome to the Neighbourhood
Chart (1995–96)	Peak position
Australian Albums (ARIA)	10
Austrian Albums (Ö3 Austria)	44
Belgian Albums (Ultratop Flanders)	37
Canada Top Albums/CDs (RPM)	14
Dutch Albums (Album Top 100)	28
Finnish Albums (Suomen virallinen lista)	28
German Albums (Offizielle Top 100)	10
New Zealand Albums (RMNZ)	17
Norwegian Albums (VG-lista)	12
Scottish Albums (Official Charts)	4
Swedish Albums (Sverigetopplistan)	22
Swiss Albums (Schweizer Hitparade)	10
UK Albums (Official Charts)	3
US Billboard 200	17

=== Year-end charts ===
1995 year-end chart performance for Welcome to the Neighbourhood
Chart (1995)	Position
Australian Albums (ARIA)	82
Canada Top Albums/CDs (RPM)	79
UK Albums (OCC)	34

1996 year-end chart performance for Welcome to the Neighbourhood
Chart (1996)	Position
German Albums (Offizielle Top 100)	93
UK Albums (OCC)	94
US Billboard 200	144

== Certifications and sales ==
Certifications and sales for Welcome to the Neighbourhood
Region	Certification	Certified units/sales
Australia (ARIA)	Gold	35,000^{^}
Canada (Music Canada)	Platinum	100,000^{^}
United Kingdom (BPI)	Platinum	300,000^{^}
United States (RIAA)	Platinum	1,000,000^{^}
^{^} Shipments figures based on certification alone.
