= Naval Mobile Construction Battalion Fifteen =

Naval Mobile Construction Battalion 15
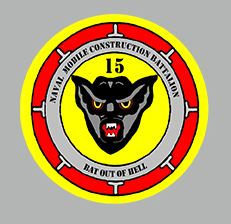
- NMCB 15 insignia
- Active: 1942 – 2014
- Country: United States
- Branch: USN
- Nickname: "Bat out of Hell"
- Engagements: World War II

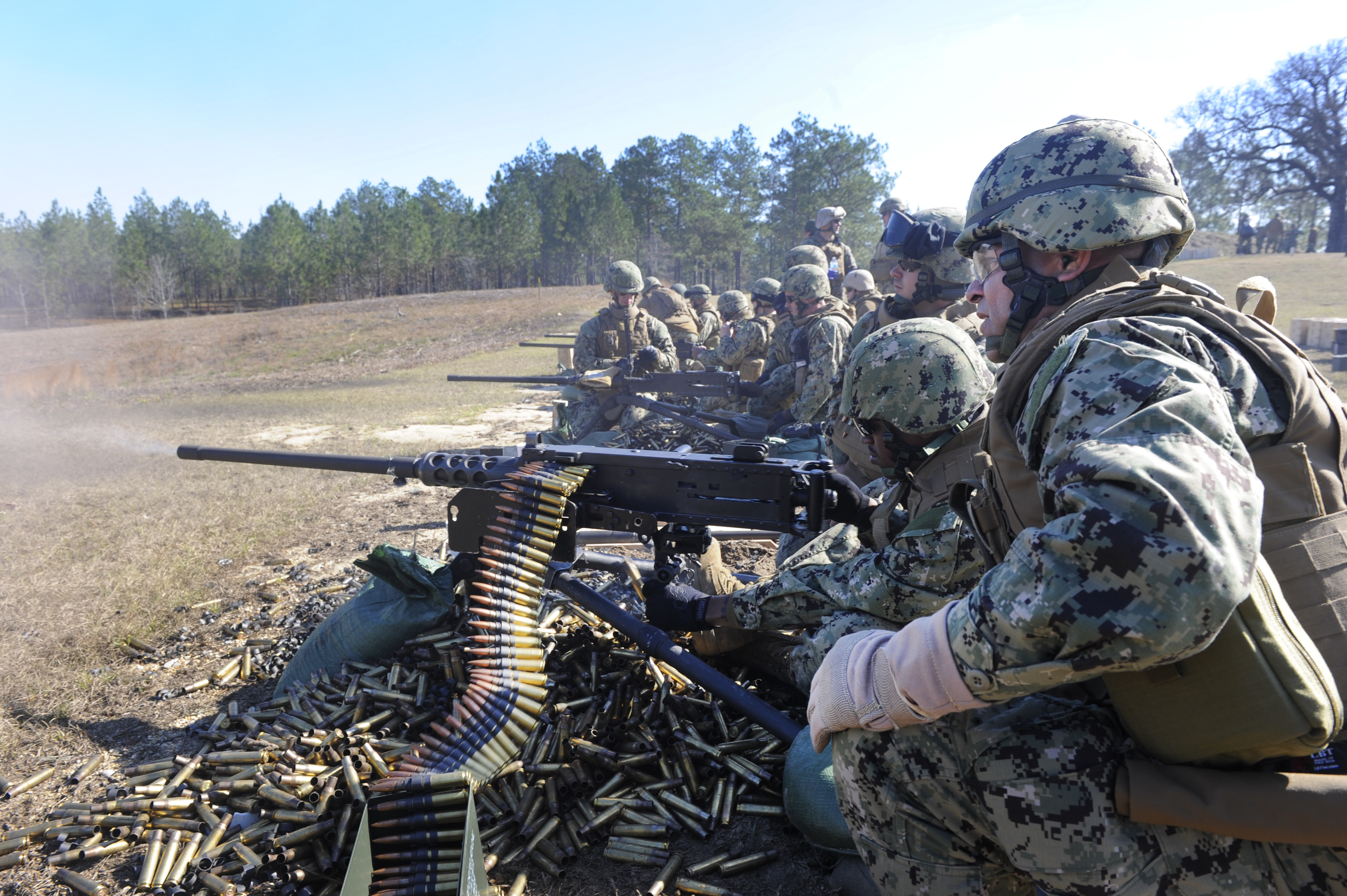
Seabees assigned to Naval Mobile Construction Battalion (NMCB) 15 fire the M2 .50-caliber machine gun while participating in a crew-served weapons range. NMCB 15 is mobilized in support of Operation Enduring Freedom and is an expeditionary element of U.S. Naval Forces that support various units worldwide through national force readiness, humanitarian assistance, and building and maintaining infrastructure. (U.S. Navy photo by Mass Communication Specialist 2nd Class Daniel Garas/Released)

Naval Mobile Construction Battalion (NMCB) 15 is a United States Navy Reserve Seabee battalion. NMCB 15 is an expeditionary element of U.S. Naval Forces that support various units worldwide through national force readiness, humanitarian assistance, and building and maintaining infrastructure.

== History ==
NMCB 15 was commissioned on 20 July 1942 at Camp Allen Virginia and was soon sent into action in the Pacific during World War II. The battalion embarked at Treasure Island for Espirito Santo. . For 13 months the battalion worked on Lion 1. That was the large advance base Naval Fleet facility constructed there. From there the battalion was sent to New Zealand for R & R. They were then sent to Banika in the Russell Islands with one detachment going to Green Island and another to Pavuvu. . From there they were sent back to the States, landing on 1 October 1944. The following June the battalion made its second deployment. This time it was to Okinawa, where they were when the war ended.

In 1962, Reserve Naval Mobile Construction Battalion FIFTEEN (RNMCB-15) was commissioned as a member of the Seabee Ready Reserve. In 1990 RNMCB-15 was renamed NMCB-15 as part of the "one Navy" concept. NMCB-15 is assigned to the NINTH Naval Construction Regiment in Ft. Worth, TX which falls under the FIRST Naval Construction Division, out of Joint Expeditionary Base Fort Story-Little Creek. The Battalion is currently deployed to Helmand Afghanistan in support of Operation Enduring Freedom and is acting as an expeditionary element of U.S. Naval Forces that support various units worldwide through national force readiness, civil engineering, humanitarian assistance, and building and maintaining infrastructure. In March 2003, NMCB-15 AIRDET was deployed to Iraq for OIF-I. A 125-member team, was the first reserve Seabees to be deployed in support of OIF-I. They completed numerous missions, such as building Camp Babylon, rebuilding 7 local schools, 2 water treatment plants. They were also instrumental in finding and securing the first mass grave site in Iraq, near AL Hillah. In 2007, NMCB-15 deployed as a full battalion to Iraq. They were instrumental in convoy security missions and helping to build local bases and infrastructure, such as roads and dams. NMCB-15 once again answered America's call, by deploying to Afghanistan in 2013. They helped coalition forces by building camps and local infrastructure. NMCB-15 was de-commissioned 30 September 2013 upon returning from Afghanistan.

== Name ==
NMCB 15 is nicknamed "Bat Out of Hell," after an unidentified Marine commander in the Pacific noted the battalion's hard work by observing that the Seabees were "going like a bat out of hell." The name was officially adopted as the battalion's logo.

== Awards ==
- Asiatic–Pacific Campaign Medal with three stars
- World War II Victory Medal
- Iraq Campaign Medal
- Afghanistan Campaign Medal
- Navy "E" Ribbon : – U.S. Atlantic Fleet Reserve Battle "E". 6 times:
