= Midnight at the Lost and Found =

Studio album by Meat Loaf
- Released: April 22, 1983
- Recorded: October 1982–February 1983
- Genres: Rock, Country
- Length: 35:26
- Labels: Cleveland International, Epic
- Producer: Tom Dowd

Meat Loaf chronology
| Dead Ringer (1981) | Midnight at the Lost and Found (1983) | Bad Attitude (1984) |

Singles from Midnight at the Lost and Found
- 1. "If You Really Want To" Released: May 1983; 2. "Razor's Edge" Released: June 1983 (UK); 3. "Midnight at the Lost and Found" Released: September 1983

Professional ratings
Review scores
| Source | Rating |
|---|---|
| AllMusic | 2/5 stars |
| Smash Hits | 7/10 |

Midnight at the Lost and Found is the third studio album by Meat Loaf, released in April 1983. This would be the final Meat Loaf release under Epic Records until The Very Best of Meat Loaf (1998).

"Razor's Edge", "If You Really Want To" and the title track were released as singles, but none of the three went inside the Top Ten on the UK Singles Chart, peaking at number 59, 41, and 17 respectively. The song "Lost Love", which was originally recorded during the sessions for the album, was released as the B-side to "If You Really Want To". This track was only released on CD on the Australian edition of Hits Out of Hell. The title track was one of very few 1980s songs to feature on the compilation album, The Very Best of Meat Loaf (1998).

== Background ==
Following a dispute with his former songwriter Jim Steinman, Meat Loaf was contractually obliged to release a new album. According to Meat Loaf, Steinman gave him "Total Eclipse of the Heart" and "Making Love Out of Nothing at All" for the album, but Meat Loaf's record company refused to pay for Steinman. The songs Steinman had given to Meat Loaf were then given to Bonnie Tyler and Air Supply respectively, which both became hits in their respective countries and worldwide. Struggling for time and with no resolution to his arguments with Steinman seemingly on the horizon (eventually, Steinman and Meat Loaf would sue one another), he was forced to find songwriters wherever he could, including writing the songs himself.

Meat Loaf is credited with being involved in the writing of numerous tracks on the album, including the title track. However, as Meat would later admit, he was not much of a songwriter and did not like the songs he had written for the album. It was also regarded by fans and critics alike as a poor effort whether compared to previous releases or on its own merit. Those same fans and critics were disappointed to see that the iconic pictures on the covers of Bat Out of Hell and Dead Ringer were replaced by a black-and-white photograph of Meat Loaf. (An Australian reissue sported a color image of Meat Loaf screaming on the cover).

J. D. Considine wrote in Musician: "I don't think I've ever heard a performer more desperately in need of a duet with Cher."

== Track listing ==
Side one
| No. | Title | Writer(s) | Length |
|---|---|---|---|
| 1. | "Razor's Edge" | Steve Buslowe, Paul Christie, Mark Doyle, Meat Loaf | 4:07 |
| 2. | "Midnight at the Lost and Found" | Steve Buslowe, Paul Christie, Meat Loaf, Dan Peyronel | 3:29 |
| 3. | "Wolf at Your Door" | Leslie Aday, Steve Buslowe | 4:05 |
| 4. | "Keep Driving" | Paul Christie, Paul Jacobs, Meat Loaf | 3:30 |
| 5. | "The Promised Land" | Chuck Berry | 2:44 |

Side two
| No. | Title | Writer(s) | Length |
|---|---|---|---|
| 6. | "You Can Never Be Too Sure About the Girl" | Steve Buslowe, Meat Loaf | 4:28 |
| 7. | "Priscilla" | Sarah Durkee, Paul Jacobs | 3:33 |
| 8. | "Don't You Look at Me Like That" | Marshall James Styler | 3:27 |
| 9. | "If You Really Want To" | George Meyer, Ted Neeley | 3:38 |
| 10. | "Fallen Angel" | Dick Wagner | 3:38 |

== Personnel ==
- Meat Loaf – lead vocals, backing vocals (10)
- Mark Doyle – guitars, piano (1, 2, 4), bass guitar (4), synthesizers (9), vocals (4, 5)
- Rick Derringer – guitars (2–4, 6–9), bass guitar (7)
- Tom Edmonds – guitars (4)
- Gary Rossington – guitars (8)
- Steve Buslowe – bass guitar
- Paul Jacobs – piano (3, 5, 6, 8–10)
- Dave Lebolt – synthesizer programming (9)
- Max Weinberg – drums
- Dale Krantz Rossington – featured female vocals (8)
- Chuck Kirkpatrick – vocals
- John Sambataro – vocals

== Charts ==
| Chart (1983) | Peak position |
|---|---|
| Australian Albums (Kent Music Report) | 84 |
| German Albums (Offizielle Top 100) | 26 |
| Norwegian Albums (VG-lista) | 7 |
| Swedish Albums (Sverigetopplistan) | 21 |
| UK Albums (Official Charts) | 7 |

== Certifications ==
| Region | Certification | Certified units/sales |
|---|---|---|
| United Kingdom (BPI) | Gold | 100,000^{^} |
^{^} Shipments figures based on certification alone.
