= Runnin' for the Red Light (I Gotta Life) =

1995 single by Meat Loaf

Single by Meat Loaf

from the album Welcome to the Neighbourhood
- Released: April 15, 1996
- Genre: Rock
- Length: 3:59
- Label: MCA
- Songwriters: Harry Vanda, George Young, Patti Russo, Meat Loaf, Sarah Durkee
- Producers: Ron Nevison, Sammy Hagar, Steven Van Zandt, Meat Loaf

Meat Loaf singles chronology
"Not a Dry Eye in the House" (1995)	"Runnin' for the Red Light (I Gotta Life)" (1996)	"A Kiss Is a Terrible Thing to Waste" (1998)

Professional ratings
Review scores
Source	Rating
Smash Hits	3/5 stars

"Runnin' for the Red Light (I Gotta Life)" is a song performed by Meat Loaf. The song was released on April 15, 1996, as the third single from Meat Loaf's seventh studio album, Welcome to the Neighborhood (1995), reaching number 21 on the UK Singles Chart and number two on the UK Rock and Metal Singles Chart.

The song's chorus is lifted from INXS and Jimmy Barnes' cover of "Good Times" by Australian rock band the Easybeats, so Easybeats members Harry Vanda and George Young are credited as writers. The song's full writing credits list Vanda and Young alongside Meat Loaf, Patti Russo and Sarah Durkee.

== Tracks ==
The single was released in two versions: a CD maxi single and a 12-inch picture disc. The CD contains the album version of the song and live versions of "Life Is a Lemon and I Want My Money Back", "Amnesty is Granted" and "Dead Ringer for Love". On the 12-inch, "Amnesty Is Granted" was replaced by "Midnight at the Lost and Found".

== Charts ==
Chart (1996)	Peak position
Australia (ARIA)	151
Europe (Eurochart Hot 100)	77
Scottish Singles Sales (Official Charts)	26
UK Singles (Official Charts)	21
UK Rock & Metal (Official Charts)	2
