= Irish Albums Chart =

Irish albums sales chart

The Irish Albums Chart is the Irish music industry standard albums popularity chart issued weekly by the Irish Recorded Music Association (IRMA). The charts were previously compiled on behalf of IRMA by Chart-Track, and have been compiled by the Official Charts Company since 2017. Chart rankings are based on sales, which are compiled through over-the-counter retail data captured electronically each day from retailers' Point of sale systems and certain digital retailers. All major record stores and over forty independents submit data for the charts, accounting for over 80% of the market, according to Chart-Track. A new chart is compiled and released to the public by the Irish Recorded Music Association on Friday at noon. Each chart is dated with the "week-ending" date of the previous Thursday (i.e., the day before issue).

It is released as a top 100, although the Official Charts Company website only archives the top 50. As of the issue dated 20 November 2026, the current number-one album on the chart is Carnaval de Luz by U2.

== Chart achievements and trivia ==
=== Albums with the most weeks at number one ===
Number of weeks	Artist	Album	Year(s)
35	Adele	21	2011–2012
28	Various Artists	A Woman's Heart	1992–1993
28	Ed Sheeran	÷	2017–2018
24	Ed Sheeran	x	2014–2017
24	Dermot Kennedy	Without Fear	2019–2021
22	Various Artists	The Greatest Showman: Original Motion Picture Soundtrack	2018–2019
21	Olivia Rodrigo	Sour	2021–2022
20	Sabrina Carpenter	Short n' Sweet	2024–2025
17	Harry Styles	Harry's House	2022–2023
15	Adele	25	2015–2016
15	Lewis Capaldi	Divinely Uninspired to a Hellish Extent	2019–2020
15	Olivia Dean	The Art of Loving	2025–2026

=== Acts to occupy the top two positions ===
- Guns N' Roses – Use Your Illusion I and Use Your Illusion II (one week in October 1991).
- Bruce Springsteen – Human Touch and Lucky Town (one week in April 1992).
- Norah Jones – Feels Like Home and Come Away With Me (two weeks in February 2004).
- Norah Jones – Come Away With Me and Feels Like Home (one week in March 2004).
- Michael Jackson – The Essential Michael Jackson and Number Ones (two weeks in July 2009).
- Glee Cast – Glee: The Music, Journey to Regionals and Glee: The Music, Volume 3 Showstoppers (one week in June 2010).
- Adele – 21 and 19 (one week in March 2011, three weeks from April 2011, one week in May 2011, one week in June 2011).
- Bruce Springsteen –- Greatest Hits and Wrecking Ball (one week in July 2012).
- Ed Sheeran – ÷ and x (two weeks in March 2017 and one week in August 2017).
- Meat Loaf - Bat Out Of Hell and Hits Out of Hell (one week in January 2022).
- Ed Sheeran – = and ÷ (one week in May 2022).
- Harry Styles – Harry's House and Fine Line (one week in September 2022).
- Taylor Swift – Speak Now (Taylor's Version) and Midnights (one week in July 2023).
- Taylor Swift - The Tortured Poets Department and Lover (one week in July 2024).
- Zach Bryan – American Heartbreak and Zach Bryan (one week in June 2025).
- Oasis - Time Flies... 1994–2009 and (What's the Story) Morning Glory? (two weeks in August 2025).

In addition to the above, Taylor Swift also occupied the entire Top 5 on the chart dated 5 July 2024, with The Tortured Poets Department at the top spot, Lover at Number 2, 1989 (Taylor's Version) at Number 3, Midnights at Number 4 and Folklore at Number 5. Swift charted a total of fourteen albums in the Top 100, the most for any artist. Swift's success on the charts was largely attributable to her three sold-out concerts at the Aviva Stadium during the tracking week. This is also the first time that the Top 10 has been fully occupied by female artists, with albums by Billie Eilish, Chappell Roan, Charli XCX and SZA also charting in the Top 10.

On the chart dated 22 August 2025, Oasis held the top three places with Time Flies... 1994–2009, (What's the Story) Morning Glory? and Definitely Maybe.

== See also ==
- Lists of Irish Albums Chart number ones
- Irish Independent Albums Chart
