= In Europa =

In Europa may refer to:

- In Europa, a 1998 album by Sol Invictus (band)
- In Europa (series), a Dutch television series first broadcast from 2007 to 2009, based on the book with the same name
- In Europa, a book by Dutch writer Geert Mak.
