= Razor's Edge (Meat Loaf song) =

Single by Meat Loaf

from the album Midnight at the Lost and Found
- B-side: "You Can Never Be Too Sure About the Girl"
- Released: June 1983 (UK)
- Length: 4:08; 4:19 (remix)
- Label: Epic
- Songwriters: Steve Buslowe, Paul Christie, Mark Doyle, Meat Loaf

Meat Loaf singles chronology
"If You Really Want To" (1983)	"Razor's Edge" (1983)	"Modern Girl" (1983)

Music video
- Video on YouTube

"Razor's Edge" is a single by Meat Loaf released in 1983. It is from the album Midnight at the Lost and Found.

== Track listing ==
=== 7" version ===
1. "Razor's Edge"
2. "You Can Never Be Too Sure About the Girl"

=== 12" version ===
1. "Razor's Edge (Remix)"
2. "Paradise by the Dashboard Light (Long Version)"
3. "Read 'Em and Weep"

=== 12" Special Edition ===
1. "Razor's Edge"
2. "You Never Can Be Too Sure About the Girl"
3. "Don't You Look at Me Like That (Alternative Version)"

== Charts ==
Chart	Position
UK Singles Chart	41
