= More Than You Deserve =

1973 musical

- Music: Jim Steinman
- Lyrics: Jim Steinman
- Book: Michael Weller
- Productions: 1973 The Public Theater

More Than You Deserve is a musical written by Jim Steinman and Michael Weller, produced by Joseph Papp and directed by Kim Friedman. After a workshop production lasting two weekends in April 1973 at the Other Stage (now known as the LuEsther Hall) of The Public Theater, it opened at the Newman Theater (also within The Public Theater) on November 21, 1973, ran for 63 performances and closed on January 13, 1974. Weller's original title for the play was Souvenirs, which referred to the severed ears of killed Viet Cong forces which the soldiers collected and wore as keepsakes on strings around their necks.

== Original cast ==
- Major Michael Dillon - Fred Gwynne
- Fiona Markham - Kimberly Farr
- Nurse/Nin Hua - Leata Galloway
- Nurse/Uncle Remus - Mary Beth Hurt
- Nathan/Herbie/Pilot - Stephen Collins
- Dr. Smith/Sgt. Price - Graham Jarvis
- Luke/Lance Moriarty - Seth Allen
- Mike / Brown / Gerald Moore - Larry Marshall
- Perrine / Rabbit - Meat Loaf
- Wiley / Trout - Kim Milford
- Owlsy / Joe - Tom Leo
- Costucci / Lt. Maddox - Edward Zang
- Spooky 1 / Vietnamese - Justin Ross
- Spooky 2 / Vietnamese / Radio man - Eivie McGehee
- Melvin - Terry Kiser
- General Chet Eastacre - Ronald (Ron) Silver

== Plot synopsis ==
The story is set in a United States Army base in Vietnam during the Vietnam War. Major Michael Dillon (Gwynne), who is impotent, falls in love with a reporter sent to cover the camp, who turns out to be a nymphomaniac during her time there. However, she realizes at the end that she will be even happier giving up her newfound lust for sex to settle down with the impotent commander.

== Song ==
"More Than You Deserve"

Song by Meat Loaf

from the album Dead Ringer
- Genre: Rock
- Length: 7:02
- Songwriter: Jim Steinman

The song that gives the musical its title was planned as a single in 1973, but ultimately cancelled, possibly due to the very wry and startling lyrics. Only promotional copies exist. Years later Meat Loaf recorded the song again for his 1981 album Dead Ringer.

== Other songs ==
1. Overture
2. Give Me the Simple Life
3. Could She Be the One
4. Where Did It Go?
5. Come With Me (We Know Love)
6. Mama, You'd Better Watch Out for Your Daughters
7. More Than You Deserve
8. O, What a War
9. Song of the City of Hope
10. To Feel So Needed
11. Mama, You'd Better Watch Out for Your Daughters (reprise)
12. Go, Go, Go, Guerrillas
13. What Became of the People We Were
14. If Only
15. Midnight Lullabye
16. Song of the Golden Egg
17. What Became of the People We Were (reprise)

== Legacy ==
Steinman and Meat Loaf first met during the production and would go on to make the multi-platinum album Bat Out of Hell. The title track from the show was recorded by Meat Loaf for the album Dead Ringer. He also performed the song on his show VH1 Storytellers.

Paul Shaffer served as musical director for the show.
