= Live in Europe =

Live in Europe may refer to:

- Live in Europe (Otis Redding album), 1967
- Live in Europe (Rory Gallagher album), 1972
- Live in Europe (Creedence Clearwater Revival album), 1973
- Live in Europe (Leo Kottke album), 1980
- Live in Europe (Curtis Mayfield album), 1988
- Live in Europe (Dave Douglas album), 1997
- Live in Europe (Mara! album), 2001
- Live in Europe (Transatlantic album), 2003
- Live in Europe (The Flock album), 2004
- Live in Europe (Kultur Shock album), 2007
- Live in Europe (Rashied Ali Quintet album), 2009
- Live in Europe (Flying Colors album), 2013
- Live in Europe (Billy Paul album), 1974
- Live in Europe (Local H album), 2017
- Live in Europe (Fred Hersch album), 2018
- Live in Europe (Melody Gardot album), 2018
- Live in Europe, a 1979 album by Burl Ives
- Pink: Live in Europe, a 2006 live music DVD by Pink
- Live in Europe 1993 by Deep Purple
- Live in Europe, U.S. release of Live in Germany 1976 by Rainbow
- Live in Europe (José González album), by José González and String Theory, 2019

== See also ==
- In Europe (disambiguation)
