= Nowhere Fast (Fire Inc. song) =

1984 song by Fire Inc.

Single by Fire Inc.

from the album Streets of Fire: Music from the Original Motion Picture Soundtrack
- Released: 1984
- Genre: Rock
- Length: 6:04
- Label: MCA
- Songwriter: Jim Steinman
- Producer: Jim Steinman
- Audio on YouTube

"Nowhere Fast" is a song, performed by Fire Inc. in 1984 for the rock movie Streets of Fire. An alternate version of the song was recorded by Meat Loaf the same year. The song was written by Jim Steinman.

== Fire Inc. single ==
The "Nowhere Fast" single contains an edit (edited down to 4:11 from the 6:02 album version) and is backed with the Marilyn Martin track "Sorcerer", also from the Streets of Fire soundtrack. Laurie Sargent performed the lead vocals. Holly Sherwood and Rory Dodd performed the background vocals.

=== Personnel ===
- Music and Lyrics: Jim Steinman
- Lead Vocals: Laurie Sargent
- Background Vocals: Rory Dodd, Holly Sherwood and Eric Troyer
- Piano: Roy Bittan
- Guitars: Dave Johnstone and Mike Landau
- Bass: Steve Buslowe
- Synthesizer: Larry Fast
- Drums: Max Weinberg and Jim Bralower
- Drum Programming: Jim Bralower
- Additional Keyboards: Jim Steinman

== Meat Loaf single ==
"Nowhere Fast"

Single by Meat Loaf

from the album Bad Attitude
- Released: November 30, 1984 (UK)
- Genre: Rock
- Length: 5:12; 6:05 (12" version); 4:00 (single edit)
- Label: Arista, RCA
- Songwriter: Jim Steinman
- Producers: Meat Loaf; Paul Jacobs; Mack

Meat Loaf singles chronology
| "Modern Girl" (1984) | "Nowhere Fast" (1984) | "Sailor to a Siren" (1984) |
- Audio on YouTube

Meat Loaf's harder rock version has an almost entirely different set of lyrics, with only the chorus being the same as the Fire Inc. version. Meat Loaf's version also has a more prominent guitar being played by Bob Kulick. Meat Loaf performed it live during the Bad Attitude tour along with his touring band, The Neverland Express. At the time of its release, it was only a minor hit, but remains a fan favorite. Meat Loaf recorded the single during Steinman's delayed return to collaboration for Bad Attitude.

The single was also released as a limited edition motorcycle-shaped vinyl. A music video was also produced.

=== Critical reception ===
Upon the British release Biba Kopf (pseudonym of journalist Chris Bohn) of New Musical Express left a typically dismissive review of 8 December 1984. He took the singer's attempt as another self-repetition of his early works by saying "The tone, as always, is that of the teenager who never quite got over the shock and disappointment of making it into his 20s." In 2021, Billboard said the Meat Loaf version "lacks just a little of the opening-curtain excitement that comes with what feels like the full-cast singalong energy of the Fire Inc. original."

=== Single versions ===
12" maxi single

- "Nowhere Fast" (6:05) (Jim Steinman)
- "Stand by Me" (3:45) (Ben E. King)
- "Clap Your Hands" (2:23) (Richard Hartley/Brian Thompson)

7" single

- "Nowhere Fast" (4:00) (Jim Steinman)
- "Clap Your Hands" (2:23) (Richard Hartley/Brian Thompson)

Both B-sides were recorded during Meat Loaf's sessions for The Rocky Horror Picture Show soundtrack, and remained unreleased until this single.

There were four different versions of the 7" single, including a shaped picture disc, a pop-up cover and a gatefold sleeve.

=== Personnel ===
- Lead Vocals: Meat Loaf
- Guitars: Bob Kulick
- Bass: John Siegler
- Piano & Keyboards, Background Vocals: Paul Jacobs
- Drums, Background Vocals: Wells Kelly
- Percussion: Frank Ricotti
- Background Vocals: Clare Torry, Stephanie de Sykes
- Produced by Meat Loaf, Paul Jacobs and Mack
