= Steve Popovich =

American music executive (1942–2011)

Steve Popovich (July 6, 1942 – June 8, 2011) was an American record company executive. As the founder of Cleveland International Records, he launched and guided the careers of many famous artists through his work with the CBS label family, including The Jacksons, Michael Stanley, Cheap Trick, Bruce Springsteen, Southside Johnny & The Asbury Jukes, Bob Dylan, and Meat Loaf. Popovich was involved as co-producer and/or label in six Grammy nominations and winner of two.

== Early life ==
Popovich was born in Nemacolin, Pennsylvania, a coal-mining town. In the late 1950s, following the death of his father, he moved to Cleveland, Ohio, where by the early 1960s he had become a bass guitarist of a Cleveland-based rock band, the Twilighters, part of a small group of popular local R&B-based bands who launched the area's rock scene in the pre-Beatles era. He was of Croatian, Serbian and Slovenian descent.

== Early career: Columbia and Epic ==
In 1967, he began an inventory control job in the warehouse at Columbia Records' local branch. His enthusiasm for music led to a promotion to the sales desk, where he handled local Cleveland sales and radio and TV promotion for such artists as The Buckinghams, Blood, Sweat & Tears, Billy Joe Royal, Johnny Cash, Paul Revere & the Raiders, and Simon & Garfunkel. In 1969, Ron Alexenburg, Director of Promotion at Columbia, promoted him to become his assistant.

In 1972, at the age of 30, Popovich was appointed by record executive Clive Davis as the first Vice President of Promotion for Columbia Records, making him the youngest VP at CBS at the time. As VP of Promotion, his local and regional staff continued their work with The Buckinghams, Johnny Cash, and Paul Revere & the Raiders, and also worked to promote artists including Loggins & Messina, Simon & Garfunkel, Jerry Vale, O.C. Smith, Dr. Hook & the Medicine Show, Shel Silverstein, Boz Scaggs, Bob Dylan, Bruce Springsteen, Santana, Janis Joplin, Marty Robbins, Lynn Anderson, Tom Rush, David Bromberg, The New York Rock & Roll Ensemble, Dave Mason, West, Bruce & Laing, Mahavishnu Orchestra, It's a Beautiful Day, New Riders of the Purple Sage, Johnny Mathis, Chicago, Percy Faith, Tony Bennett, Peter Nero, Earth, Wind & Fire, Taj Mahal, The Manhattans, The Wombles, Mark Lindsay, Eric Andersen, Andy Williams, Ray Coniff, David Essex, Chambers Brothers, Miles Davis, Mott the Hoople, Johnny Winter and others. In 1972 and 1973, he was voted National Promotion Man of the Year by Billboard Magazine.

From 1974 to 1976, he worked under Alexenburg as Vice President for A&R at Epic Records, signing and launching the careers of artists including Jaco Pastorius, Boston, Cheap Trick, Ted Nugent, Wild Cherry, Suzy and the Red Stripes, Southside Johnny & The Asbury Jukes, Bettye LaVette, George Duke, Doc Severinsen, Joe Tex, Dave Loggins, Charlie Rich and The Soul Children. Popovich and Alexenburg won the Clive Davis Award for Promotion Excellence.

== Cleveland International Records, the Hall of Fame induction and later career ==
He was founder and president of Cleveland International Records from 1977 to 1982, whose biggest success was Meat Loaf's Bat Out of Hell, which sold 45 million records worldwide and at one time, one of the top selling albums in the history of the music business. The label also had international success with Jim Steinman’s solo album Bad for Good, and Ellen Foley's Night Out. The company’s first single was in 1977 featuring "Say Goodbye to Hollywood", Ronnie Spector & The E Street Band produced by Miami Steve Van Zandt.

In 1986, he was Senior Vice President of PolyGram Nashville working with the Statler Brothers, Tom T. Hall, and Kathy Mattea and responsible for signing Johnny Cash, Kris Kristofferson, Johnny Paycheck, Frank Yankovic (winner of First Polka Grammy 1986), Wayne Toups & Zydecajun, Donna Fargo, David Lynn Jones, Everly Brothers, and special projects like The Class of ’55 Album featuring Johnny Cash, Roy Orbison, Jerry Lee Lewis and Carl Perkins.

In 1995, Popovich moved back to Cleveland to re-establish the Cleveland International label. The same year the label released 10 albums. Cleveland International Records' roster between 1995 and 2005 included David Allan Coe, Frank Yankovic, Brave Combo, Eddie Blazonczyk, The Singing Nun, Chas & Dave, Michael Learns to Rock, and Roger Martin among others. During this period Popovich also helped to release several polka albums. In 1999 the Polkasonic album by rock polka band Brave Combo won a Grammy as the Best Polka Album.

When Epic Records, responsible for distribution of Bat Out of Hell was sold by CBS to Sony Music, Popovich successfully sued Sony for not paying royalties and then in 2002 sued them again after Sony had failed to place the Cleveland International logo on reissued copies of the album.

In 1997, Popovich was inducted into the National Cleveland-Style polka Hall of Fame.

== Death ==
In his final years, Popovich moved to Tennessee to live near his son Steve Popovich Jr. and his family. He died aged 68 in his home in Murfreesboro, Tennessee, and was survived by son Steve Jr, daughter Pam and his grandchildren Steven and Tanner. He is buried in Western Reserve Memorial Gardens in Chesterland.
