= Blind Before I Stop (song) =

Single by Meat Loaf

from the album Blind Before I Stop
- B-side: "Execution Day"
- Released: February 9, 1987
- Label: Arista
- Songwriters: Meat Loaf, John Golden

Meat Loaf singles chronology
"Rock 'n' Roll Mercenaries" (1986)	"Blind Before I Stop" (1987)	"Special Girl" (1987)
- Audio on YouTube

"Blind Before I Stop" is a single by Meat Loaf released in 1987. It is from the album Blind Before I Stop. It is one of the few songs he has made where he plays rhythm guitar.

== Critical reception ==
On its release, Mat Snow of New Musical Express stated, "This is not a patch on his elephantine 'Rock 'n' Roll Mercenaries', though it might serve as a timely health warning to some of Meat Loaf's more frenzied devotees."

== Personnel ==
- Meat Loaf — lead vocals, guitar
- Mats Björklynd — keys, programming, drums
- Peter Weihe — guitars
- Dieter Petereit — bass
- John Golden — bass
- Pit Löw — keyboards and programming
- Curt Cress — drums
- Amy Goff — backing vocals
- Peter Bischof — vocals
- Bert Gebhard — vocals
- Bimey Oberreit — vocals
- Elaine Goff — vocals

== Charts ==
Chart	Peak position
UK Singles Chart	89
