= Dead Ringer (album) =

Studio album by Meat Loaf
- Released: September 4, 1981
- Recorded: February–June 1981
- Genre: Rock
- Length: 42:10
- Labels: Cleveland International; Epic
- Producers: Meat Loaf; Stephan Galfas; Jimmy Iovine; Jim Steinman

Meat Loaf chronology
Bat Out of Hell (1977)	Dead Ringer (1981)	Midnight at the Lost and Found (1983)

Singles from Dead Ringer
- 1. "I'm Gonna Love Her for Both of Us" Released: September 1981; 2. "Dead Ringer for Love" Released: November 1981; 3. "Read 'Em and Weep" Released: March 1982; 4. "Peel Out" Released: 1982 (EU)

Dead Ringer is recognised (Note: 1971's Stoney & Meatloaf album was something of a Motown curio.) as the second studio album from the rock career of American singer Meat Loaf, released on September 4, 1981. Dead Ringer, like 1977's Bat Out of Hell before it, was written entirely by Jim Steinman. The album cover was designed by comic book artist and horror illustrator Bernie Wrightson.

== Album background ==
Steinman started to work on Bad for Good, the album that was supposed to be the follow-up to 1977's Bat Out of Hell, in 1978. During that time, a combination of touring, drugs and exhaustion had caused Meat Loaf to lose his voice. Without a singer, and pressured by the record company, Steinman decided that he should sing on Bad for Good himself, and write a new album for Meat Loaf. This album was Dead Ringer, which was later released in 1981, after the release of Bad for Good.

After playing the role of Travis Redfish in the movie Roadie, Meat Loaf got his voice back, got off drugs, played softball, and started to work on his new album in 1980. Steinman had written five new songs which, in addition to a new, re-recorded version of "More Than You Deserve" (which Meat Loaf had sung in the musical with the same name) and a reworked monologue, formed the album Dead Ringer. The album was produced by Meat Loaf and Stephan Galfas, with Jimmy Iovine and Steinman producing "Read 'Em And Weep" and "Dead Ringer For Love".

Four singles were released from the album: "Dead Ringer for Love" (featuring Cher), "I'm Gonna Love Her for Both of Us", "Read 'Em and Weep" and "Peel Out". The album reached number 1 in the UK.

The tour for this album also marked the beginning of Meat Loaf's long-running collaboration with pianist Paul Jacobs, as both sideman and songwriter.

== Reception ==
Dead Ringer was considered both a commercial and critical disappointment after the worldwide success of Meat Loaf's debut album Bat Out of Hell, possibly due to aspects of its production. Parke Puterbaugh of Rolling Stone called the album a "cast-iron drag" .

Professional ratings
Review scores
Source	Rating
AllMusic	3/5 stars
Rolling Stone	2/5 stars

== Track listing ==
All tracks are written by Jim Steinman.

Side one
No.	Title	Length
1.	"Peel Out"	6:30
2.	"I'm Gonna Love Her for Both of Us"	7:09
3.	"More Than You Deserve"	7:02

Side two
No.	Title	Length
4.	"I'll Kill You if You Don't Come Back"	6:24
5.	"Read 'Em and Weep"	5:25
6.	"Nocturnal Pleasure" (Monologue by Steinman)	0:38
7.	"Dead Ringer for Love"	4:21
8.	"Everything Is Permitted"	4:41

== Personnel ==
=== Arrangements ===
- Roy Bittan – co-arranger
- Tom Malone – horn arrangements (7)
- Alden Shuman, Roy Straigis – string arrangements (3, 8)

=== Band ===
- Meat Loaf – lead vocals
- Davey Johnstone – guitars
- Mick Ronson – guitars (3)
- Joe DeAngelis – acoustic guitars (1)
- Steve Buslowe – bass guitar
- Roy Bittan – piano, keyboards (1, 2, 8)
- Nicky Hopkins – piano (3)
- Larry Fast – synthesizers (1, 6)
- Lou Del Gatto, Tom Malone, Lou Marini, Alan Rubin – horns (7)
- Max Weinberg – drums
- Liberty DeVitto – drums (5, 7)
- Jimmy Maelen – percussion, African logs (7)
- Leslie Aday – female voice (1)
- Jim Steinman – spoken word (6)
- Cher – guest vocals (7)
- Rhonda Coullet (7), Rory Dodd, Ted Neeley, Allan F. Nicholls, Eric Troyer – vocals

== Charts ==
Chart (1981–1982)	Peak position
Australian Albums (Kent Music Report)	5
Canada Top Albums/CDs (RPM)	26
Dutch Albums (Album Top 100)	10
Finnish Albums (The Official Finnish Charts)	29
German Albums (Offizielle Top 100)	8
New Zealand Albums (RMNZ)	2
Norwegian Albums (VG-lista)	10
Swedish Albums (Sverigetopplistan)	1
UK Albums (Official Charts)	1
US Billboard 200	45

== Certifications ==
Region	Certification	Certified units/sales
Australia (ARIA)	Gold	35,000^{^}
Canada (Music Canada)	Gold	50,000^{^}
United Kingdom (BPI)	Platinum	300,000^{^}
^{^} Shipments figures based on certification alone.
