= In Europa (TV program) =

Dutch series of TV documentary programs

In Europa is a Dutch series of television documentary programs on Europe during the 20th century, based on the book with the same name by Dutch writer and historian Geert Mak. The program was broadcast on Nederland 2, premiering on 11 November 2007 and airing through 2009. Quite a few locations important in European history are shown throughout the series, both historical and current.

Although the series is mainly in Dutch, many of the episodes can be understood, as interviews with eyewitnesses or sons or daughters of contemporary figures tend to be in English. Episodes are available for viewing on the official website.

== Production ==
The series had a budget of 4 million Euro, and was cofinanced by the Dutch Ministry of Interior Relations.

== Episodes ==
- The first seven episodes are about World War I
- Episode 8: The Treaty of Versailles and the murder of Walther Rathenau
- Episode 9: Mussolini
- Episode 10: The rise of Nazism
- Episode 11: The rise of Joseph Stalin and the Ukrainian Genocide
- Episode 12: Spanish Civil War
- Episodes 13–14: Hitler and Nazi-Germany
- Episode 15: Vichy France
- Episode 16: Concentration camp Buchenwald and the company Topf und Söhne
- Episode 17: Stalingrad
- Episode 18: Poland in 1943
- Episode 19: Riots in Warsaw and Prague in 1944
- Episode 20: Germany and Russia in 1945
- Episode 21: Yugoslavia in 1945, 22 Israël and Europe in 1946
- Episode 23: Czech Republic in 1948
- Episode 24: Europe in 1950
- Episode 25: Hungary in 1956
- Episode 26: France-Algeria 1958
- Episode 27: DDR in 1961
- Episode 28: Amsterdam-Berlin-Paris 1968
- Episode 29: Portugal 1974
- Episode 30: Germany 1977

== Broadcast ==
After two episodes the Flemish public channel (Canvas) bought the series, starting broadcasts on 8 January 2008. Swedish public channel Sveriges Television bought the series as well, starting broadcasts from January 2009. Croatian public television (HRT) also bought the series and begun broadcasting from late 2011 through 2012.
