= The National Lampoon Show =

1970s American stage show

- Written by: John Belushi; Brian Doyle-Murray; Bill Murray; Gilda Radner; Harold Ramis
- Music by: Paul Jacobs

Premiere
- Date: 1975; 51 years ago
- Place: New Palladium Club (Off-Broadway)
- Directed by: (touring) John Belushi (Off-Broadway) Martin Charnin

The National Lampoon Show, a spinoff of the humor magazine National Lampoon, was a 1974–1976 stage show that helped launch the performing careers of John Belushi, Brian Doyle-Murray, Bill Murray, Gilda Radner, and Harold Ramis. The company's stage successor to National Lampoon's Lemmings (1973), some skits from the show made their way into the 1978 film National Lampoon's Animal House.

The show was produced by Ivan Reitman. It was mostly written improvisationally by its original cast ("overlooked" by National Lampoon writer/editor Sean Kelly).

The National Lampoon Show toured colleges in the U.S. in 1974, including Rider University, Slippery Rock University, and the University of Texas at Arlington, with those productions directed by cast member Belushi. It opened Off-Broadway in New York City at the New Palladium Club on February 17, 1975, directed by Martin Charnin. The original Off-Broadway cast starred Belushi, Doyle-Murray, Bill Murray, Radner, and Ramis. It ran for 180 performances, closing in July 1975. After closing in New York, it went on a second, nine-month-long, national tour.

Shortly after the show closed in New York, Belushi and Radner joined the original cast of Saturday Night Live, with the Murray brothers soon joining the SNL cast as well. Ramis, meanwhile, used some of the sketches from the show in the script of National Lampoon's first film production, Animal House, released in 1978.

== Description ==
The National Lampoon Show was a satirical revue, mixing social and political satire. It was fueled by black comedy, frequently insulting and abusing the audience, with the cast openly expressing hatred for the crowd. The show was a mix of sadistic and masochistic elements, characterized by aggressive, juvenile, and controversial humor.

One skit was a parody of a television fundraiser in which Patty Hearst (played by Radner), dressed in SLA garb, asked viewers for money to pay for weaponry. (The skit ended with Hearst shooting her fiancé Steven Weed.) Another skit involved Jacqueline Kennedy Onassis being a panelist on a celebrity game show who is so startled by the sound of a starting pistol that she ducks under her seat. Songs included one about white-collar criminals living comfortably in prison and another being a manic celebration of New York City's mundane aspects (featuring Bill Murray).

== Cast ==
The cast included:

- John Belushi
- Joe Flaherty
- Brian Doyle-Murray
- Bill Murray
- Gilda Radner
- Harold Ramis

Later cast replacements:

- Richard Belzer (replacing Harold Ramis)
- Barry Diamond
- Larry Dilg
- Ellen Foley (replacing Gilda Radner)
- Christopher Guest
- Carol Horne (replacing Mimi Kennedy)
- Jim Hosbein
- Paul Jacobs
- Meat Loaf (replacing Belushi)
- Mimi Kennedy (replacing Gilda Radner)

== Production ==
=== Writers ===
The writers included:

- John Belushi
- Joe Flaherty
- Brian Doyle-Murray
- Bill Murray
- Gilda Radner
- Harold Ramis
- Janis Hirsch

=== Producers ===
- Ivan Reitman
- "Sean Kelly Production supervised by Dale Anglund"

=== Directors ===
- John Belushi (1974 touring production)
- Martin Charnin (Off-Broadway)

=== Music ===
- Paul Jacobs (music director)
- Jim Steinman

== Reception ==
The New York Times gave the production a negative review, writing that the show "set new boundaries for impropriety. But... it does not match its bad taste with good humor." Comparing the show unfavorably to Lemmings (which it characterized as "half of a very funny evening"), it cited The National Lampoon Show as being half as clever. The reviewer felt that despite some standout performances, particularly by Belushi, the show fell short in execution, leaving a gap between its ambitious ideas and their comedic realization.

== See also ==
- The National Lampoon Radio Hour
- That's Not Funny, That's Sick
