= Not a Dry Eye in the House =

1996 single by Meat Loaf

Single by Meat Loaf

from the album Welcome to the Neighborhood
- B-side: "I'd Lie for You (And That's the Truth)" (live)
- Released: January 15, 1996
- Genre: Soft rock
- Length: 5:54
- Label: MCA; Virgin
- Songwriter: Diane Warren
- Producer: Ron Nevison

Meat Loaf singles chronology
"I'd Lie for You (And That's the Truth)" (1995)	"Not a Dry Eye in the House" (1996)	"Runnin' for the Red Light (I Gotta Life)" (1996)

"Not a Dry Eye in the House" is a song composed and written by Diane Warren, and recorded by Meat Loaf. The song was released on January 15, 1996, as the second single from the album Welcome to the Neighborhood. It peaked at number seven in the UK, becoming Meat Loaf's last top-10 hit there until "It's All Coming Back to Me Now" in 2006. It was the last US charting single to be released in Meat Loaf's lifetime before his death in January 2022.

== Music video ==
The video for "Not a Dry Eye in the House" consisted of Meat Loaf overlooking an old theater stage. During the song he remembers the girl of his dreams leaving him (she was an old movie starlet). Aged, he goes back into flashbacks and overlooks the various times she broke his heart and cries out in song. This music video was directed by Howard Greenhalgh.

== Track listings ==
US maxi-CD single

1. "Not a Dry Eye in the House" (Somewhere in Time edit) – 5:02
2. "Let It Be" – 2:26
3. "Come Together" – 3:16
4. "I'd Lie for You (And That's the Truth)" (Live at the Beacon Theater, New York – October 1995) (feat. Patti Russo) – 7:23

UK CD singles

In the United Kingdom, there were two versions released of the single. The first version contains live versions of "Where the Rubber Meets the Road" and "I'd Lie for You (And That's the Truth)", while the other has two Beatles' covers, "Let It Be" and "Come Together".

== Charts ==
Chart (1996)	Peak position
Australia (ARIA)	111
Canada Top Singles (RPM)	80
Europe (Eurochart Hot 100)	37
Germany (GfK)	93
Ireland (IRMA)	23
Scottish Singles Sales (Official Charts)	9
UK Singles (Official Charts)	7
US Billboard Hot 100	82

== Release history ==
Region	Date	Format(s)	Label(s)	Ref.
United Kingdom	January 15, 1996	CD1; cassette	Virgin	
United States	January 16, 1996	Contemporary hit radio	MCA	
United Kingdom	January 22, 1996	CD2	Virgin	
