= Bad Attitude (album) =

Studio album by Meat Loaf
- Released: November 2, 1984 (UK); April 1985 (US)
- Recorded: April–August 1984
- Genre: Hard rock
- Length: 39:18
- Label: Arista Records (Europe); RCA Records (US)
- Producer: Alan Shacklock (original recordings), Paul Jacobs, Meat Loaf, Mack

Meat Loaf chronology
Midnight at the Lost and Found (1983)	Bad Attitude (1984)	Blind Before I Stop (1986)

Singles from Bad Attitude
- 1. "Modern Girl" Released: September 28, 1984 (UK); 2. "Nowhere Fast" Released: November 30, 1984 (UK); 3. "Piece of the Action" Released: March 15, 1985 (UK); 4. "Surf's Up" Released: June 20, 1985 (US)

Professional ratings
Review scores
Source	Rating
AllMusic	3/5 stars
Smash Hits	6/10

Bad Attitude is the fourth studio album by American singer Meat Loaf, released in November 1984. Recorded in Britain, it features two songs by Jim Steinman, both previously recorded, and a duet with Roger Daltrey. According to Meat Loaf's autobiography, he approached Steinman about writing the entire album, but waiting for new songs wound up taking so long that Meat Loaf recorded two previously released Steinman songs and moved on with other writers. The album concentrates more on the hard rock side of Meat Loaf, was a minor success around the globe and contained a few hit singles, the most successful being "Modern Girl".

The US release in April 1985 from RCA Records features a slightly different track order as well as alternate mixes for some songs. This remixed version of the album was reissued on CD in the United States and Canada in 1993.

The 30th anniversary remastered reissue by Cherry Red Records, released in 2014, contains only the original UK track order and mixes.

== Track listing ==
=== UK/Europe version ===
No.	Title	Writer(s)	Length
1.	"Bad Attitude"	Sarah Durkee, Paul Jacobs	4:44
2.	"Modern Girl"	Durkee, Jacobs	4:24
3.	"Nowhere Fast"	Jim Steinman	5:12
4.	"Surf's Up"	Jim Steinman	4:23
5.	"Piece of the Action"	Durkee, Jacobs	4:15
6.	"Jumpin' the Gun"	Durkee, Jacobs	3:12
7.	"Cheatin' in Your Dreams"	John Parr	4:08
8.	"Don't Leave Your Mark on Me"	Julia Downes, Parr	4:07
9.	"Sailor to a Siren"	Durkee, Jacobs	4:40

=== 1985 US version ===
No.	Title	Writer(s)	Length
1.	"Bad Attitude" (Duet with Roger Daltrey)	Durkee, Jacobs	4:55
2.	"Modern Girl" (Duet with Clare Torry)	Durkee, Jacobs	4:28
3.	"Nowhere Fast"	Steinman	5:13
4.	"Surf's Up"	Steinman	4:46
5.	"Piece of the Action"	Durkee, Jacobs	4:02
6.	"Jumpin' the Gun" (Duet with Zee Carling)	Durkee, Jacobs	3:13
7.	"Sailor to a Siren"	Durkee, Jacobs	5:05
8.	"Don't Leave Your Mark on Me"	Downes, Parr	4:08
9.	"Cheatin' in Your Dreams"	Parr	4:16

== Personnel ==
=== Production (US release only) ===
- Meat Loaf, Paul Jacobs, Bob Kulick — remixing (1, 2, 4, 5, 7)
- Harvey Goldberg — remixing (1, 2, 7)
- Josh Abbey — remixing (4)
- Tony Taverner — remixing (5)
- Mack — remixing (6)
- Simon Sullivan — extra recordings

=== Arrangements ===
- Paul Buckmaster, Paul Jacobs — string arrangements

=== Band ===
All track numbers based on UK ordering. Adjust according to US release as necessary when referring to list above.

- Meat Loaf — lead vocals
- Bob Kulick — guitars
- Paul Vincent — guitars (4, 6)
- John Siegler — bass
- Mo Foster — bass (5)
- Paul Jacobs — piano, keyboards, backing vocals
- Steve Rance — Fairlight programming
- Ronnie Asprey — saxophone (7)
- Wells Kelly — drums, percussion, backing vocals
- Curt Cress — drums (4)
- Frank Ricotti — percussion (3, 6)
- Roger Daltrey — additional lead vocals (1)
- Clare Torry — additional lead vocals (2), backing vocals
- Zee Carling — additional lead vocals (6)
- Stephanie de Sykes — backing vocals

== Singles ==
in Europe, "Modern Girl" (UK #17), "Nowhere Fast" (UK #67), and "Piece of the Action" (UK #47) were released as singles with extended mixes and exclusive songs: "Take a Number", "Stand by Me" (a Ben E. King cover) and "Clap Your Hands". The latter two songs were recorded during the sessions for the Rocky Horror Picture Show soundtrack. "Surf's Up" was released as a US single and "Sailor to a Siren" was released as a double A-side with "Modern Girl".

== Charts ==
Chart (1984–1985)	Peak position
Australian Albums (Kent Music Report)	42
German Albums (Offizielle Top 100)	24
Swedish Albums (Sverigetopplistan)	36
UK Albums (OCC)	8
US Billboard 200	74

== Certifications ==
Region	Certification	Certified units/sales
United Kingdom (BPI)	Gold	100,000^{^}
^{^} Shipments figures based on certification alone.
