= Midnight at the Lost and Found (song) =

Single by Meat Loaf

from the album Midnight at the Lost and Found
- Released: September 16, 1983
- Genre: Rock
- Length: 3:30; 3:40 (remix)
- Label: Epic
- Songwriters: Steve Buslowe, Paul Christie, Meat Loaf, Dan Peyronel

Meat Loaf singles chronology
"Peel Out" (1981)	"Midnight at the Lost and Found" (1983)	"If You Really Want To" (1983)
- Audio on YouTube

"Midnight at the Lost and Found" is a single by Meat Loaf released in 1983. It is from the album Midnight at the Lost and Found.

== Track listing ==
1. "Midnight at the Lost and Found" (Remix)
2. "Fallen Angel" (Remix)
3. "Bat Out of Hell" (Live Version)
4. "Dead Ringer for Love" (Long Version)

== Charts ==
Chart	Position
UK Singles Chart	17
