= I'd Lie for You (And That's the Truth) =

1995 single by Meat Loaf

Single by Meat Loaf

from the album Welcome to the Neighbourhood
- Released: October 3, 1995
- Recorded: Virgin
- Genre: Soft rock
- Length: 6:41 (album version); 4:43 (radio edit)
- Label: MCA (North America); Virgin (Europe)
- Songwriter: Diane Warren
- Producer: Ron Nevison

Meat Loaf singles chronology
"Objects in the Rear View Mirror May Appear Closer than They Are" (1994)	"I'd Lie for You (And That's the Truth)" (1995)	"Not a Dry Eye in the House" (1996)

"I'd Lie for You (And That's the Truth)" is a song composed and written by Diane Warren, and recorded by American singer and actor Meat Loaf and Patti Russo. The song was released in October 1995 by MCA Records as the first single from Meat Loaf's seventh studio album, Welcome to the Neighbourhood (1995). The single release reached No. 2 on the UK Singles Chart, and No. 13 and 18 on the US Billboard Hot 100 and Cash Box Top 100 charts.

== Music video ==
The music video for "I'd Lie for You" was directed by British director Howard Greenhalgh with cinematography by Daniel Pearl, who had also photographed the music video for "I'd Do Anything for Love (But I Won't Do That)". The storyline appears to start out as a continuation of the ending of the "I'd Do Anything...," video, but quickly morphs into a big budget concept piece that borrows heavily from the Indiana Jones film series. Meat Loaf and the woman companion continue riding into the desert, now pursued by a helicopter, while being simultaneously observed by a chiseled-looking Indiana Jones-type "action hero" and a military despot (played by Xander Berkeley). The motorcycle riders then abruptly vanish, only to reappear in the camp of the relic hunter who has recently discovered an ancient mask.

The 'hero' type (played by Brett Cullen, an actor who has sung backup for Meat Loaf) immediately takes interest in Meat Loaf's girlfriend (Dana Patrick back from the previous video, lip-syncing this time to vocals supplied by Patti Russo), and she in him. What follows is adventure mayhem and perilous situations featuring many vehicle chases, and large explosions, while Meat Loaf alternates between playing the hero's sidekick, and singing to his love interest of his devotion from afar, as the other man seduces her. The heroine even sings her lines to the other man. In the end, the adventurer chooses the treasure over the woman and flees, leaving Meat Loaf to reunite with her.

== Formats and track listings ==
In Europe, the "I'd Lie for You" single was released as two CDs. The regular edition was backed with live versions of "Hot Patootie (Whatever Happened to Saturday Night?)" and "I'd Do Anything for Love", while the limited edition contained the non-album track "Oh, What a Beautiful Morning" from Oklahoma! and the album track "Runnin' for the Red Light".

- US CD single
1. "I'd Lie for You (And That's the Truth)" – 6:37
2. "I'd Do Anything for Love" (Live in New York City, 1993) (feat. Patti Russo) – 5:27
- US cassette single
1. "I'd Lie for You (And That's the Truth)" – 6:37
2. "I'd Do Anything for Love" (Live in New York City, 1993) (feat. Patti Russo) – 5:27
- European CD single 1
1. "I'd Lie for You (And That's the Truth)" (Pioneers of the West Mix) – 5:28
2. "Hot Patootie (Whatever Happened to Saturday Night?)" (Live) - 3:19
3. "I'd Do Anything for Love" (Live in New York City, 1993) (feat. Patti Russo) – 5:28
- European CD single 2
1. "I'd Lie for You (And That's the Truth)" (Fountain Head Mix)
2. "Oh, What a Beautiful Morning"
3. "Runnin' for the Red Light (I Gotta Life)"

== Charts ==
=== Weekly charts ===
Chart (1995)	Peak position
Australia (ARIA)	7
Austria (Ö3 Austria Top 40)	31
Belgium (Ultratop 50 Flanders)	10
Belgium (Ultratop 50 Wallonia)	35
Canada Top Singles (RPM)	11
Canada Adult Contemporary (RPM)	19
Europe (Eurochart Hot 100)	9
Europe (European Hit Radio)	9
Germany (GfK)	17
Hungary (Mahasz)	9
Iceland (Íslenski Listinn Topp 40)	19
Ireland (IRMA)	4
Israel (Israeli Singles Chart)	4
Netherlands (Dutch Top 40)	10
Netherlands (Single Top 100)	9
New Zealand (Recorded Music NZ)	14
Norway (VG-lista)	10
Scottish Singles Sales (Official Charts)	1
Sweden (Sverigetopplistan)	9
Switzerland (Schweizer Hitparade)	24
UK Singles (Official Charts)	2
US Billboard Hot 100	13
US Adult Contemporary (Billboard)	21
US Adult Pop Airplay (Billboard)	17
US Pop Airplay (Billboard)	24
US Cash Box Top 100	18

=== Year-end charts ===
Chart (1995)	Position
Australia (ARIA)	83
Belgium (Ultratop 50 Flanders)	72
Canada Top Singles (RPM)	80
Europe (Eurochart Hot 100)	69
Netherlands (Dutch Top 40)	75
Netherlands (Single Top 100)	78
Sweden (Topplistan)	93
UK Singles (OCC)	35

== Certifications ==
Region	Certification	Certified units/sales
United Kingdom (BPI)	Silver	200,000^{^}
United States (RIAA)	Gold	500,000^{^}
^{^} Shipments figures based on certification alone.

== Release history ==
Region	Date	Format(s)	Label(s)	Ref(s).
United States	September 26, 1995	Rock; contemporary hit radio	MCA	
United States	October 3, 1995	CD; cassette	MCA	
United Kingdom	October 16, 1995	CD; cassette	Virgin	
Australia	October 23, 1995	CD	Virgin	
Japan	November 13, 1995	CD	Virgin	
Australia	November 20, 1995	Cassette	Virgin	
