= Modern Girl (Meat Loaf song) =

Single by Meat Loaf

from the album Bad Attitude
- Released: September 28, 1984 (UK); April 4, 1985 (US)
- Genre: Rock
- Length: 4:27; 5:54 (extended version); 3:56 (single edit)
- Songwriter(s): Paul Jacobs / Sarah Durkee

Meat Loaf singles chronology
"If You Really Want To" (1983)	"Modern Girl" (1984)	"Nowhere Fast" (1984)
- Audio on YouTube

"Modern Girl" is a song written by Paul Jacobs and Sarah Durkee, first performed by Meat Loaf. It was also the first single from his 1984 Bad Attitude album, resulting in one of his few hits during the 1980s. The single peaked at number 16 in Ireland and number 17 in the UK.

== Different formats ==
The "Modern Girl" single was released in several versions: the regular 12- and 7-inch singles, a 12" picture disc and a 7" shaped picture disc. All versions contained "Modern Girl" and "Take a Number", a non-album B-side. In the United States, the song was released as "(Give Me the Future with a) Modern Girl" with the album cut "Sailor To a Siren" as B-side.

=== 12" maxi single and picture disc ===
- "Modern Girl" (extended version / freeway mix) — 5:54 (Paul Jacobs / Sarah Durkee)
- "Take a Number" (extended version) — 5:28 (Jacobs / Durkee)

=== 7" single and shaped picture disc ===
- "Modern Girl" — 4:27 (Jacobs / Durkee)
- "Take a Number" — 3:27 (Jacobs / Durkee)

=== US 7" single ===
- "(Give Me the Future with A) Modern Girl" (single version) — 3:56 (Jacobs / Durkee)
- "Sailor to a Siren" — 5:09 (Jacobs / Durkee)

== Other versions ==
=== Music video ===
During the music video, directed by Brian Grant, Meat Loaf is sporting a leather jacket and walks by various scenes dealing with 'modern' women. It starts out with a "Miss America" and "Mr. Right" who are newfound parents. Then it gets into a biker-type charade and leads into the big gospel-type chorus near the end. The scenes were filmed at Beckton Gas Works.

=== Live performances ===
Meat Loaf has performed "Modern Girl" many times during the '80s as a regular on his set list. It made a comeback during "The Very Best of Meat Loaf" and "Storytellers" tours in the late 1990s.

Live versions of the song can be found on the Live at Wembley album and the Bad Attitude - Live! video.

On the live version from the Live at Wembley album, Meat Loaf does not sing the "Gimme the future" part of the chorus, as he left it to the backing vocalists. He used similar arrangements for "Blind Before I Stop" on the same album.
