= Special Girl =

1984 single by Eddie Schwartz

"Special Girl" is a song written by Canadian singer-songwriter/guitarist Eddie Schwartz in collaboration with songwriter/producer and fellow Canadian David Tyson. It has been a modest hit for Schwartz in Canada, for the band America in the US, and for Meat Loaf in the UK.

== Charted versions ==
=== Eddie Schwartz version (1984) ===
"Special Girl" first appeared on Schwartz' 1984 album, Public Life, and was released as a single with an accompanying music video. It reached No. 20 on the Adult Contemporary charts in Canada.

==== Charts ====
Chart (1984)	Peak position
Canada RPM Adult Contemporary	20

=== America version (1984) ===
"Special Girl"

Single by America

from the album Perspective
- B-side: "Unconditional Love"
- Released: September 1984
- Genre: Rock
- Length: 3:47
- Label: Capitol
- Songwriters: Eddie Schwartz, David Tyson
- Producer: Richie Zito

America singles chronology
"The Last Unicorn" (1984)	"Special Girl" (1984)	"Can't Fall Asleep to a Lullaby" (1984)

Later the same year, the band America recorded a version, releasing it as a single from their 1984 album Perspective. This version cracked the top 20 on the Adult Contemporary chart in the United States, reaching No. 15. It also reached No. 106 on the Billboard chart.

==== Charts ====
Chart (1984)	Peak position
US Billboard Easy Listening	15
US Billboard Hot 100	106
Canada RPM Adult Contemporary	7

=== Meat Loaf version (1986) ===
The tune was also covered by Meat Loaf on his 1986 album, Blind Before I Stop. Issued as a single in the UK on 6 April 1987, it reached No. 81 in the UK Singles Chart.

==== Charts ====
Chart (1986)	Peak position
UK Singles Chart	81
