= I'm Gonna Love Her for Both of Us =

Single by Meat Loaf

from the album Dead Ringer
- Released: September 4, 1981
- Genre: Rock
- Length: 7:09; 4:29 (single edit)
- Label: Epic
- Songwriter: Jim Steinman

Meat Loaf singles chronology
"Dead Ringer for Love" (1981)	"I'm Gonna Love Her for Both of Us" (1981)	"Read 'Em and Weep" (1981)

Music video
- Video on YouTube

"I'm Gonna Love Her for Both of Us" is a song by Meat Loaf released in 1981. It was released as the lead single from the album Dead Ringer.

Record World said that "Meat comes roaring to the rescue of a mistreated woman."

== Track listing ==
1. "I'm Gonna Love Her for Both of Us"
2. "Everything Is Permitted"

== Charts ==
Chart	Position
Billboard Hot 100	84
UK Singles Chart	62
New Zealand	40
