= Rock 'n' Roll Mercenaries =

Single by Meat Loaf and John Parr

from the album Blind Before I Stop
- A-side: "Rock 'n' Roll Mercenaries (Exploded Version)"
- B-side: "R.P.M. (written by John Golden & Meat Loaf)"
- Released: August 1986 (UK)
- Genre: Rock
- Length: 4:58
- Label: Arista
- Songwriters: Al Hodge, Michael Dan Ehmig
- Producer: Frank Farian

Meat Loaf singles chronology
"Piece of the Action" (1985)	"Rock 'n' Roll Mercenaries" (1986)	"Blind Before I Stop" (1987)

John Parr singles chronology
"Two Hearts" (1986)	"Rock 'n' Roll Mercenaries" (1986)	"Blame It on the Radio" (1986)
- Audio on YouTube

"Rock 'n' Roll Mercenaries" is a song by Meat Loaf and John Parr, which was released in 1986 as the lead single from Meat Loaf's fifth studio album Blind Before I Stop. The song was written by Al Hodge and Michael Dan Ehmig, and produced by Frank Farian.

== Background ==
In a 1986 interview with Record Mirror, Meat Loaf said of the song's message, "It's about the music business. It's about people who do it, but they aren't true to themselves. The perfect example is Deep Purple, last year. That's the perfect example of a rock 'n' roll mercenary. 'Let's take the money and run'."

Speaking of the song's lack of commercial success in the US, Parr told the Hartlepool Mail in 1988, "Sometimes you just can't seem to win. We thought it would have been a monster in the States but the radio wouldn't give us any airplay."

== Critical reception ==
On its release, Lucy O'Brien of New Musical Express considered "Rock 'n' Roll Mercenaries" to be "a run-of-the-mill guitar-befuddled manifestation of the American dream". Chris Roberts of Sounds commented, "What a pair of paunches. Loser meets loser. Result: dead loss." In a review of its single release in the US, Billboard described the song as a "hard rock indictment".

== Personnel ==
- Meat Loaf — lead vocals, backing vocals, additional guitars
- John Parr — guest vocals
- Mats Björklynd — guitars, keys, programming
- Johan Daansen — guitars
- Peter Weihe — guitars
- Dieter Petereit — bass
- John Golden — bass
- Harry Baierl — keyboards, programming
- Pit Löw — keyboards and programming
- Curt Cress — drums
- Amy Goff — backing vocals
- Frank Farian — additional vocals
- Peter Bischof — vocals
- Bert Gebhard — vocals
- Bimey Oberreit — vocals
- Elaine Goff — vocals

== Track listing ==
1. "Rock 'n' Roll Mercenaries" (Exploded Version)
2. "R.P.M."

== Charts ==
Chart	Position
Finnish Singles Chart	16
UK Singles Chart	31
