= Blind Before I Stop =

- Original Arista album cover

Studio album by Meat Loaf
- Released: September 22, 1986
- Recorded: February–June 1986
- Genres: Hard rock; pop rock; heavy metal
- Length: 48:33
- Labels: Arista; Atlantic (US/Canada)
- Producer: Frank Farian

Meat Loaf chronology
Bad Attitude (1984)	Blind Before I Stop (1986)	Bat Out of Hell II: Back into Hell (1993)

Singles from Blind Before I Stop
- 1. "Rock 'n' Roll Mercenaries" Released: August 1986 (UK); 2. "Getting Away with Murder" Released: November 1986; 3. "Blind Before I Stop" Released: February 1987; 4. "Special Girl" Released: April 1987

Alternate US album cover
- Alternate cover used for the US release

Professional ratings
Review scores
Source	Rating
AllMusic	2/5 stars
Kerrang!	4.5/5 stars
Metal Hammer	6/7
Record Mirror	3.5/5 stars
Sounds	3/5 stars

Blind Before I Stop is the fifth studio album by American singer Meat Loaf, released in September 1986. The album was produced in Germany by Frank Farian and was the first to fully embrace the '80s sound. Critics were concerned about the album missing the characteristic Steinman-influenced sound by incorporating synth chords and samples. According to Meat Loaf's 1998 autobiography, he would have preferred to wait to work with more Steinman material, but his contractual obligations with Arista required him to complete two more albums by the end of the 1980s, including this album and a live album.

Meat Loaf co-wrote three of the songs on the album. Two of them, "Blind Before I Stop" and "Rock 'n' Roll Mercenaries" were performed live on U.K. show Saturday Live, with Meat Loaf playing guitar. "Rock 'n' Roll Mercenaries", a duet with rock singer John Parr, was released as a single in the UK. Meat Loaf sang the song live with Parr on only one occasion and did not do so again after an incident just after the release of the single. During a sold-out show in London, the singer failed to introduce Parr onto the stage and Parr walked off after the song was over. Despite leaving dozens of phone messages begging for forgiveness, Meat Loaf never heard from Parr again. During his late 1980s tour of Europe, Meat Loaf picked up pianist Frank Doyle. Richard Raskin had made contributions to arrangements on previous musical tracks some years before and his style can still be heard on bass.

Music videos were created for several singles from the album, including "Getting Away with Murder" (which is a cover version of a 1985 song by Mystic Rhythm) and "Rock 'n' Roll Mercenaries". Several songs from the album were featured as bonus tracks on the 1998 CD re-release of Bad Attitude in lieu of their inclusion on The Very Best of Meat Loaf compilation album released the same year.

Billboard said of "Getting Away with Murder that Meat Loaf "rocks out r&b style." Cash Box said it could "signal a solid chart comeback for Meat Loaf" and praised the arrangement and production."

== Track listing ==
No.	Title	Writer(s)	Length
1.	"Execution Day"	Meat Loaf, Dick Wagner	6:30
2.	"Rock 'n' Roll Mercenaries"	Michael Dan Emmig, Alan Hodge	5:00
3.	"Getting Away with Murder"	Terry Britten, Sue Shifrin	3:49
4.	"One More Kiss (Night of the Soft Parade)"	Meat Loaf, John Golden	5:40
5.	"Blind Before I Stop"	Meat Loaf, Golden, Paul Christie	3:33
6.	"Burning Down"	Billy Rankin	5:00
7.	"Standing on the Outside"	John Lang, Richard Page, Steve George	3:57
8.	"Masculine"	Rick Derringer	4:23
9.	"A Man and a Woman"	Jerry Riopelle, John Harris	4:11
10.	"Special Girl"	Eddie Schwartz, Dave Tyson	3:54
11.	"Rock 'n' Roll Hero"	John Wilcox	4:30

== Personnel ==
=== Band ===
- Meat Loaf — lead vocals, backing vocals (1, 2, 6, 8), guitar (5), additional guitars (2)
- John Parr — guest vocals (2)
- Mats Björklynd — guitars (1, 2, 3, 8), bass (3, 6), keys, programming, drums (5, 9)
- Johan Daansen — guitars (2, 7, 10)
- Peter Weihe — guitars
- Dieter Petereit — bass
- John Golden — bass (2, 4, 5, 7, 9, 10)
- Harry Baierl — piano (4, 7, 8), keyboards, programming (2)
- Pit Löw — keyboards and programming
- Mel Collins — saxophone (1, 3, 6)
- Curt Cress — drums
- Amy Goff — female vocals (9), backing vocals
- Frank Farian — additional vocals (2), backing vocals (6)
- Peter Bischof — vocals
- Bert Gebhard — vocals
- Bimey Oberreit — vocals
- Elaine Goff — vocals
- The Jackson Singers — choir (1, 6, 7)

== Singles ==
- "Rock 'n' Roll Mercenaries" #31 UK
- "Blind Before I Stop" #89 UK
- "Special Girl" #81 UK

== Charts ==
=== Weekly charts ===
Weekly chart performance for Blind Before I Stop
Chart (1986–1987)	Peak position
Finnish Albums (The Official Finnish Charts)	24
German Albums (Offizielle Top 100)	51
Swedish Albums (Sverigetopplistan)	36
Swiss Albums (Schweizer Hitparade)	21
UK Albums (Official Charts)	28

=== Monthly charts ===
Monthly chart performance for Blind Before I Stop
Chart (1989)	Peak position
Soviet Albums (Moskovskij Komsomolets)	8

== Certifications ==
Region	Certification	Certified units/sales
United Kingdom (BPI)	Silver	60,000^{^}
^{^} Shipments figures based on certification alone.
