= Cleveland International Records =

American record label

- Founded: 1976/1977
- Founder: Steve Popovich, Sr
- Genre: Rock, polka
- Country of origin: United States
- Location: Willoughby, Ohio; Nashville
- Official website: www.ClevelandInternational.com

Cleveland International Records is an independent record label formed in 1976 by Steve Popovich, Sr. originally founded in Willoughby, Ohio, and moved to Nashville.

== History ==
One of the first albums the label released was Bat Out of Hell (1977) by Meat Loaf which has sold over 40 million copies worldwide. They have also released recordings by Ronnie Spector, B. J. Thomas, Ian Hunter, Slim Whitman and The Irish Rovers, among others.

After working in the Nashville industry for more than a decade, collaborating with the likes of Johnny Cash, Popovich Sr. moved back to Cleveland in 1994. A year later, he re-established the Cleveland International label with a focus on Polka music.

The label won a lawsuit in 2005 when Sony Music produced copies of the Bat Out of Hell CD without the Cleveland International logo. In 2007, a court ordered Sony to pay Cleveland $5 million.

With his estate finally settled, Popovich, Sr.'s son, Steve Popovich, Jr. revived the record label in late December 2018. Cleveland International Records will operate out of Nashville, but Popovich, Jr. said the goal will be to open an office in Cleveland down the road.

== Dispute between Cleveland International and Sony ==
In 1995, Cleveland International sued Sony Music Entertainment for unpaid royalties from sales of "Bat Out of Hell." Under the terms of the 1998 settlement agreement ending the suit, Sony agreed to pay US$6.7 million and include the Cleveland International logo on all future releases of the album. In 2002, Steve Popovich, founder of Cleveland International, sued Sony alleging that Sony had failed to include the logo on the album as agreed. In 2005, the federal district court in Cleveland, Ohio entered judgment against Sony pursuant to a jury verdict in favor of Popovich and awarded Popovich US$5,700,000 in damages for Sony's breach of the 1998 settlement agreement. Sony appealed the verdict but in 2007 the federal appellate court in Cincinnati, Ohio affirmed the judgment of the trial court. In 2012, Sony reached a final out-of-court settlement with Popovich's estate over more unpaid royalties revealed in an audit performed prior to Popovich's death in 2011.

== See also ==
- List of record labels
