= If You Really Want To =

Single by Meat Loaf

from the album Midnight at the Lost and Found
- Released: May 1983
- Genre: Rock
- Length: 3:38
- Label: Epic
- Songwriter(s): George Meyer, Ted Neeley

Meat Loaf singles chronology
"Midnight at the Lost and Found" (1983)	"If You Really Want To" (1983)	"Razor's Edge" (1983)

Music video
- Video on YouTube

"If You Really Want To" is a single by Meat Loaf released in 1983. It is from the album Midnight at the Lost and Found. A music video was made for this song. Both the original album version and the alternative version of the song presented on the 12" vinyl single share the same running time, albeit with a slightly different mix.

The b-side song "Lost Love" was not issued on the original album and was only issued in CD format on the Australian edition of the compilation album Hits Out of Hell.

== Track listing ==
=== 7" version ===
1. "If You Really Want To" — 3:38
2. "Keep Driving" — 3:33

=== 12" version ===
1. "If You Really Want To" (Alternative Version) — 3:38
2. "Lost Love" — 3:37
3. "Keep Driving" — 3:38

== Charts ==
Chart	Position
UK Singles Chart	59
