= Read 'Em and Weep =

1981 single by Meat Loaf

Single by Meat Loaf

from the album Dead Ringer
- B-side: "Everything Is Permitted"
- Released: November 1981 (US): March 12, 1982 (UK)
- Genre: Rock
- Label: Epic
- Songwriter: Jim Steinman
- Producers: Jim Steinman, Jimmy Iovine

Meat Loaf singles chronology
"I'm Gonna Love Her for Both of Us" (1981)	"Read 'Em and Weep" (1981)	"Peel Out" (1981)

Music video
- Video on YouTube

"Read 'Em and Weep"

Single by Barry Manilow

from the album Greatest Hits Vol. II
- B-side: "One Voice"
- Released: November 1983
- Genre: Easy listening
- Length: 5:16
- Label: Arista
- Songwriter: Jim Steinman
- Producer: Jim Steinman

Barry Manilow singles chronology
"Some Kind of Friend" (1983)	"Read 'Em and Weep" (1983)	"You're Looking Hot Tonight" (1984)

Music video
- Video on YouTube

"Read 'Em and Weep" is a rock song composed by Jim Steinman. It was originally written for Meat Loaf and recorded for his 1981 album, Dead Ringer, the second of only two tracks on the album produced by Steinman and Jimmy Iovine.

== Critical reception ==
AllMusic wrote: "This impassioned lament from Dead Ringer is one of the best post-Bat Out Of Hell Meat Loaf tunes."

== Barry Manilow version ==
"Read 'Em and Weep" did not become a hit until late 1983, when a slightly rewritten, lighter pop version was recorded by Barry Manilow as one of three new tracks on his compilation album Greatest Hits, Vol. II. This version featured new lyrics for the second half of the song's second verse, as well as slight changes in the first verse and final chorus. It was a chart-topping success, hitting No. 1 on the Canadian and U.S. Adult Contemporary charts for six weeks, as well as peaking at No. 18 on the U.S. Billboard Hot 100 in the first weeks of 1984, becoming Manilow's final Billboard top forty hit.

=== Chart performance ===
Chart (1983–84)	Peak position
Canada Adult Contemporary	1
UK Singles (The Official Charts Company)	17
U.S. Billboard Adult Contemporary	1
US Billboard Hot 100	18

== See also ==
- List of number-one adult contemporary singles of 1983 (U.S.)
