= Bat Out of Hell =

1977 studio album by Meat Loaf

Studio album by Meat Loaf
- Released: October 21, 1977
- Recorded: 1975–1976
- Studios: Bearsville (Woodstock, New York); Utopia Sound (Lake Hill, New York); The Hit Factory (New York City); House of Music (West Orange, New Jersey)
- Genres: Hard rock; progressive rock; pop
- Length: 46:25
- Labels: Cleveland International; Epic
- Producer: Todd Rundgren

Meat Loaf chronology
Stoney & Meatloaf (1971)	Bat Out of Hell (1977)	Dead Ringer (1981)

Singles from Bat Out of Hell
- 1. "You Took the Words Right Out of My Mouth (Hot Summer Night)" Released: October 1977; 2. "Two Out of Three Ain't Bad" Released: March 1978; 3. "Bat Out of Hell" Released: May 1978 (Aus); 4. "Paradise by the Dashboard Light" Released: August 1978; 5. "All Revved Up with No Place to Go" Released: October 1978 (UK)

Bat Out of Hell is the debut studio album by American rock singer Meat Loaf. Composed by Jim Steinman, the album was developed from the musical Neverland, a futuristic rock version of Peter Pan which Steinman wrote for a workshop in 1974. It was recorded during 1975 and 1976 at various studios, including Bearsville Studios in Woodstock, New York. The album was produced by Todd Rundgren, and released in October 1977 by Cleveland International Records and Epic Records. Bat Out of Hell spawned two Meat Loaf sequel albums: Bat Out of Hell II: Back into Hell (1993) and Bat Out of Hell III: The Monster Is Loose (2006).

Bat Out of Hell has sold over 43 million copies worldwide, making it one of the best-selling albums of all time. It is certified 14× platinum by the Recording Industry Association of America (RIAA). It is the best-selling album in Australia, having been certified 26× platinum by the Australian Recording Industry Association (ARIA). As of June 2019, it has spent 522 weeks in the UK Albums Chart, the fourth longest chart run by a studio album. In 2012, Rolling Stone ranked it at number 343 on its list of the 500 Greatest Albums of All Time. The album inspired Bat Out of Hell: The Musical, staged by Jay Scheib in 2017.

== Pre-production ==
The album was adapted from a musical, Neverland; the play is a futuristic rock version of Peter Pan which Steinman wrote for a workshop in 1974, and performed at the Kennedy Center Music Theatre Lab in 1977. Steinman and Meat Loaf, who were touring with The National Lampoon Show, felt that three songs were "exceptional" and Steinman began to develop them as part of a seven-song set that they wanted to record as an album. The three songs were "Bat Out of Hell," "Heaven Can Wait" and "The Formation of the Pack," which was later retitled "All Revved Up with No Place to Go".

Bat Out of Hell is often compared to the music of Bruce Springsteen, particularly the album Born to Run. Steinman says he finds that "puzzling, musically," although they share influences; "Springsteen was more an inspiration than an influence." A BBC article added "that Max Weinberg and Roy Bittan from Springsteen's E Street Band played on the album only helped reinforce the comparison."

Steinman and Meat Loaf had difficulty finding a record company willing to sign them. According to Meat Loaf's autobiography, the band spent most of 1975 writing and recording material, and two and a half years auditioning the record and being rejected. Manager David Sonenberg jokes that new record companies were being created just so the album could be rejected. They performed the album live in 1976, with Steinman on piano, Meat Loaf singing, and sometimes Ellen Foley joining them for "Paradise." Steinman says that it was a "medley of the most brutal rejections you could imagine." Meat Loaf "almost cracked" when CBS executive Clive Davis rejected the project. According to Meat Loaf's autobiography, Davis commented that "actors don't make records" and challenged Steinman's writing abilities and knowledge of rock music:

Do you know how to write a song? Do you know anything about writing? If you're going to write for records, it goes like this: A, B, C, B, C, C. I don't know what you're doing. You're doing A, D, F, G, B, D, C. You don't know how to write a song.... Have you ever listened to pop music? Have you ever heard any rock-and-roll music.... You should go downstairs when you leave here...and buy some rock-and-roll records.

Meat Loaf asserts "Jim, at the time, knew every record ever made. [He] is a walking rock encyclopedia." Although Steinman laughed off the insults, the singer screamed "Fuck you, Clive!" from the street up to his building.

In one 1989 interview with Classic Rock magazine, Steinman labeled Todd Rundgren "the only genuine genius I've ever worked with." In a 1989 interview with Redbeard for the In the Studio with Redbeard episode on the making of the album, Meat Loaf revealed that Jimmy Iovine and Andy Johns were potential candidates for producing Bat Out of Hell before being rejected by the singer and Steinman in favor of Todd Rundgren, whom Meat Loaf initially found cocky but grew to like. Rundgren found the album hilarious, thinking it was a parody of Springsteen. The singer quotes him as saying: "I've 'got' to do this album. It's just so 'out' there." They told the producer that they had previously been signed to RCA.

== Production ==
Recording started in late 1975 in Bearsville Studios, Woodstock, New York. Roy Bittan and Max Weinberg, the pianist and the drummer from Springsteen's E Street Band played on the album, in addition to members of Rundgren's group Utopia: Kasim Sulton, Roger Powell and John "Willie" Wilcox. Edgar Winter played the saxophone on "All Revved Up." Rundgren himself played guitar, including the "motorcycle solo" on "Bat Out of Hell." Both Steinman and Rundgren were influenced by Phil Spector and his "Wall of Sound." According to Meat Loaf, Rundgren put all the arrangements together because although "Jim could hear all the instruments" in his head, Steinman hummed rather than orchestrated.

When Rundgren discovered that the deal with RCA did not actually exist, Albert Grossman, who had been Bob Dylan's manager, offered to put it on his Bearsville label but needed more money. Rundgren had essentially paid for the album himself. Mo Ostin at Warner Bros. was impressed, but other senior people rejected them after they performed live. Steinman had offended them a few years earlier by auditioning with a song named "Who Needs the Young," which contains the lyric "Is there anyone left who can fuck? Screw 'em!"

Another E Street Band member, Steven Van Zandt, and Sonenberg arranged to contact Cleveland International Records, a subsidiary of Epic Records. After listening to the spoken word intro to "You Took the Words Right Out of My Mouth (Hot Summer Night)", founder Steve Popovich accepted the album for Cleveland.

Rundgren initially mixed the record in one night. However, some of the mixes were unsuitable, to the extent that Meat Loaf did not want "Paradise by the Dashboard Light" on the album. Jimmy Iovine, who had mixed Springsteen's Born to Run, remixed "Two Out of Three Ain't Bad." After several attempts by several people, John Jansen mixed the version of "Paradise by the Dashboard Light" that is on the album, along with "All Revved Up with No Place to Go." According to Meat Loaf, he, Jansen and Steinman mixed the title track.

Phil Rizzuto's baseball play-by-play call for "Paradise by the Dashboard Light" was recorded in 1976 at The Hit Factory in New York City by Rundgren, Meat Loaf and Steinman. As an Italian Catholic, Rizzuto publicly maintained he was unaware that his contribution would be equated with sex in the finished song. However, Meat Loaf asserts that Rizzuto claimed ignorance only to stifle criticism and was fully aware of the context of what he was recording.

In a 2016 interview with the BBC, Meat Loaf claimed the entire album was "sped up" when it was released as compared to the recording.

== Composition ==
"Bat Out of Hell"
This sample contains the beginning of the chorus.

Todd Rundgren states that Steinman was highly influenced by the "rural suburban teenage angst" of Springsteen. According to manager David Sonenberg, "Jim would always come up with these great titles and then he would write a song that would try to justify the greatness of the title."

Since 1968, Steinman had been working on a magnum opus, which finally opened in 2017 in the form of Bat Out Of Hell: The Musical. The first incarnation of his work was a musical called The Dream Engine when he was in college at Amherst. The qualities of teenage rebellion and a girl joining a "tribe" led by a charismatic leader are present in all versions of Steinman's work. It is in The Dream Engine that the spoken word piece "Hot Summer Night" originates, and is the earliest work that appears on the Meat Loaf album, where it is performed by Jim Steinman and actress Marcia McClain.

The next incarnation of Steinman's magnum opus, during the 1970s, was a musical called Neverland, which contained many of the same scenes and themes as The Dream Engine but was now largely depoliticized and contained many Peter Pan references. Some scenes in Neverland, such as the parents feeding their imprisoned daughter "dream suppressant" drugs, are still present in Bat Out Of Hell: The Musical, but overall Neverland was of a much darker tone. This musical contained the songs "Heaven Can Wait", "Bat Out of Hell", and "All Revved Up with No Place to Go". On the 25th anniversary version of Bat Out of Hell, one of the bonus live tracks, "Great Boleros of Fire", is an instrumental version of another song from Neverland titled "Gods". (Meat Loaf finally recorded and released this song under the title "Godz" on his 2016 album Braver Than We Are.)

When staged in 1977, the cast of Neverland included Ellen Foley as Wendy – who performs the lead female vocal on "Paradise by the Dashboard Light" on the album. The music for Neverland was performed by Orchestra Luna, and one of their members at the time was Karla DeVito. Foley was not available when it came time to go on tour for the album, so Karla DeVito took her place. In the various promotional music videos for the songs on the album Bat Out of Hell Karla DeVito's lips are synced to Ellen Foley's album vocals.

The opening track "Bat Out of Hell" is the result of Steinman's desire to write the "most extreme crash song of all time".

"You Took the Words Right Out of My Mouth" is musically inspired by the rock chords of The Who's "Baba O'Riley" with a Phil Spector-style melody on top. In Jim Steinman's Neverland and Bat Out of Hell: The Musical, the spoken word "Hot Summer Night" and this song are used as an exchange of wedding vows, and to celebrate a wedding.

The song "Two Out of Three Ain't Bad" was written in direct response to actress Mimi Kennedy asking Jim Steinman whether he could write a simple song like Elvis Presley's "I Want You, I Need You, I Love You". Todd Rundgren identifies how the song was influenced by the Eagles, who were successful at the time. The producer also highlights the "underlying humor in the lyrics", citing the line "There ain't no Coupe de Ville hiding at the bottom of a Cracker Jack box." He says you could "get away" with that lyric only "in a Meat Loaf song."

Ellen Foley, who appears on "Paradise by the Dashboard Light", first met Meat Loaf and Jim Steinman while they were all working together on the National Lampoon Road Tour, so they had a history of performing over-the-top musical comedy sketches together. The baseball commentary make-out section performed by New York Yankees announcer Phil Rizzuto was written with the announcer in mind, using phrases he would actually say during commentary.

"For Crying Out Loud" was originally written for the 1975 New York Shakespeare Festival musical Kid Champion, and a recording by an unknown artist is in the New York Public Library archives. Jim Steinman considers the line "And can't you see my faded Levi's bursting apart" his most daring lyric on the entire album.

Comparing the album to Steinman's late-1960s musical The Dream Engine, Classic Rock magazine says that Steinman's imagery is "revved up and testosterone-fueled. Songs like 'Paradise by the Dashboard Light,' 'Two Out of Three Ain't Bad' and 'For Crying Out Loud' echoed the textbook teenage view of sex and life: irrepressible physical urges and unrealistic romantic longing."

Steinman's songs for Bat Out of Hell are personal but not autobiographical:

I never thought of them as personal songs in terms of my own life but they were personality songs. They were all about my obsessions and images. None of them takes place in a normal world. They all take place in an extreme world. Very operatic...they were all heightened. They don't take place in normal reality.

For example, citing the narrative of "Paradise", Rundgren jokes that he can't imagine Steinman being at a lakeside with the most beautiful girl in school, but he can imagine Steinman "imagining" it.

== Cover ==
Steinman is credited with the album cover concept, which was illustrated by Richard Corben. The cover depicts a motorcycle, ridden by a long-haired man, bursting out of the ground in a graveyard. In the background, a large bat perches atop a mausoleum that towers above the rest of the tombstones. In 2001, Q magazine listed the cover as number 71 in its list of "The Hundred Best Record Covers of All Time".

Steinman had wanted equal billing with Meat Loaf on the album's title; he wanted it to be called "Jim Steinman presents..." or "Jim and Meat", or vice versa. For marketing reasons, the record company wished to make 'Meat Loaf' the recognizable name. As a compromise, the words "Songs by Jim Steinman" appear relatively prominently on the cover. The singer believes that this was probably the beginning of their "ambivalent relationship".

Steinman registered "Bat Out of Hell" as a trademark in 1995, and sought to prevent Meat Loaf from using the title. In 2006, however, the singer sought to cancel Steinman's trademark and use the title for Bat Out of Hell III: The Monster Is Loose.

== Release and promotion ==
Bat Out of Hell was released by Cleveland International Records in October 1977. However, at Cleveland International Records' parent label, Epic Records, almost everyone hated it. Steve Popovich, the head of Cleveland International Records, was relentless in his efforts to get Epic and all of CBS Records and radio on board. In 1993, Steinman reflected that the album was "timeless in that it didn't fit into any trend. It's never been a part of what's going on. You could release that record at any time and it would be out of place."

Response to the album was slow. Todd Rundgren asserts that it was "underpromoted", having a reputation of being "damaged goods because it had been walked around to so many places." Due to the enthusiastic response to the music videos from the record, Australian and British audiences were the first to develop interest. The BBC television program The Old Grey Whistle Test aired a clip of the live band performing the nine-minute title track. According to Classic Rock, the response was so overwhelming that they screened it again the following week. They later invited the band to perform "Paradise" live. "As a result, in the UK, 'Bat' became an unfashionable, uncool, non-radio record that became a 'must-have' for everyone who heard it, whether they 'got' Steinman's unique perspective or not."

Meanwhile, in North America, according to Billboard magazine, Popovich and his partners began promoting the album aggressively, first getting radio play in Omaha, Neb., Cleveland and New York. By year's end, the album had sold a respectable 140,000 copies by Popovich's account, but the promotion people at Epic were still unmoved. Popovich, in a letter to his former boss Alexenburg, complained, "Some of your guys have given up." But not in Canada: Graham Powers, CBS Canada's Director of Marketing introduced himself to CHUM-FM's new Program Director Warren Cosford. Cosford's background was as the production manager of radio documentaries on The Beatles, Elvis Presley and the 64-hour Evolution of Rock which were in syndication throughout North America. Powers had heard that Warren was a fan of 'Wall of Sound' production and suggested that he listen to Bat Out of Hell over the Christmas and New Years holiday. Cosford loved it. The first day after New Years he called a music meeting. Everyone agreed they should not only 'add' Bat Out of Hell....but put it in 'Heavy Rotation' for a week to gauge audience response. The telephones lit up. As their parent company in New York had earlier turned the record down and were merely distributing it, CBS Canada were surprised, but jumped on board. Later, as Graham Powers said, "Tackling the Meat Loaf campaign was different from handling most other CBS international acts in that there was no prior stateside success to refer to. The album was doing virtually nothing in the U.S. and subsequently had to be approached as a totally new project in Canada with a Marketing Campaign developed from scratch." Publicity Manager Liz Braun added that after Meat Loaf had played at the El Mocambo where he caused a riot, all the press in town wanted to talk to him and did. Suddenly he had a hardcore following in Toronto and he was asked to perform at the CBS Convention in New Orleans. Meat Loaf 'Live' at The El Mocambo was immediately pressed to disc and distributed to stations throughout North America.

The album has been released in various formats, including a Super Audio CD version, a 25th anniversary edition (2001 – Epic/Legacy #62171) with two bonus tracks ("Great Boléros of Fire (live intro)" [3:54] and "Bat Out of Hell (live)" [11:10], and a "Bat Out of Hell: Re-Vamped" release (1991) containing the bonus song "Dead Ringer for Love". A new hybrid SACD version was released in late 2016 by Analog Spark, an audiophile imprint of the Razor & Tie label, mastered from the original tapes by Ryan Smith at Sterling Sound.

== Reception ==
Professional ratings
Review scores
Source	Rating
AllMusic	4.5/5 stars
Christgau's Record Guide	C−
The Encyclopedia of Popular Music	4/5 stars
The Rolling Stone Album Guide	2.5/5 stars

The album was not an immediate hit in the United States. Reviews were initially mixed, but have since become much more positive. On release, Dave Marsh's review in Rolling Stone called the songs "swell, but... entirely mannered and derivative" and noted that the arrangements "aren't bad", and commended the musicians. He concluded by noting that the "principals have some growing to do."

=== Legacy ===
Stephen Erlewine in AllMusic writes that "this is Grand Guignol pop—epic, gothic, operatic, and silly, and it's appealing because of all of this." He thinks that Steinman is "a composer without peer, simply because nobody else wanted to make mini-epics like this." Rundgren's production is applauded, as is the wit in the music and lyrics. "It may elevate adolescent passion to operatic dimensions, and that's certainly silly, but it's hard not to marvel at the skill behind this grandly silly, irresistible album."

In 1989, Kerrang! magazine listed the album at number 38 among the "100 Greatest Heavy Metal Albums of All Time". The album was ranked number 343 on Rolling Stone's 2003 list of the 500 greatest albums of all time, but was removed from the 2020 revision. In 2005, Bat Out of Hell was ranked number 301 in Rock Hard magazine's book of "The 500 Greatest Rock & Metal Albums of All Time". In 2006, it was voted number nine in a poll conducted by the Australian Broadcasting Corporation to discover Australia's most popular album. In November 2007, Meat Loaf was awarded the Classic Album award in Classic Rock's Classic Rock Roll of Honour. The album was also included in the book 1001 Albums You Must Hear Before You Die.

The album continues to sell about 200,000 copies per year and has sold an estimated 34-40 million copies worldwide, including 14 million in the United States and over 1.7 million albums in Australia, where it is the country's highest-selling album as of 2016, being certified 26× platinum. The album has stayed on the UK Albums Chart for 522 weeks, making it the UK's fourth longest charting studio album behind Fleetwood Mac's Rumours, Pink Floyd's The Dark Side of the Moon and Oasis' (What's the Story) Morning Glory?. In 2022, Bat Out of Hell was named as the biggest-selling debut album in UK chart history. In 2026 indie rock group Fantastic Cat would title their third studio album Cat Out of Hell as a parody & homage to Bat Out of Hell.

The album launched the career of Steinman, who would later begin producing his records as well; he was specifically sought by Bonnie Tyler on the basis of his work and production styles on the album to revitalize her career and produce an album specifically modeled on the productions of Phil Spector. The resulting album, Faster Than the Speed of Night became a commercial success, with its lead single "Total Eclipse of the Heart" placing at the top of the charts in the United States and the United Kingdom. Aside from Tyler, he composed and produced songs for musicians such as Air Supply, Barry Manilow, Barbra Streisand, the Sisters of Mercy, and Celine Dion.

== Track listing ==
=== Original release ===
All tracks are written by Jim Steinman.

Side one
No.	Title	Length
1.	"Bat Out of Hell"	9:48
2.	"You Took the Words Right Out of My Mouth (Hot Summer Night)"	5:04
3.	"Heaven Can Wait"	4:38
4.	"All Revved Up with No Place to Go"	4:19

Side two
No.	Title	Length
5.	"Two Out of Three Ain't Bad"	5:23
6.	"Paradise by the Dashboard Light": I. "Paradise"; II. "Let Me Sleep on It"; III. "Praying for the End of Time"	8:28
7.	"For Crying Out Loud"	8:45
Total length:		46:25

=== CD reissue bonus tracks ===
No.	Title	Length
8.	"Boléro" (live intro; previously unreleased)	3:54
9.	"Bat Out of Hell" (live; previously unreleased)	11:10
10.	"Dead Ringer for Love"	4:19
Total length:		67:32

== Personnel ==
=== Arrangements ===
- Kenneth Ascher – string arrangements (3, 5)
- Steve Margoshes – orchestra arrangement (7)

=== Band ===
- Meat Loaf – lead vocals, backing vocals (6), percussion (2)
- Todd Rundgren – guitar (1, 2, 4–6), percussion (1, 2), keyboards (1), backing vocals (1–3, 5, 6)
- Kasim Sulton (misspelled as "Sultan" in vinyl liner notes) – bass guitar (1, 2, 4–7), backing vocals (1)
- Roy Bittan – piano (solo 7), keyboards
- Steve Margoshes – piano (7)
- Cheryl Hardwick – piano (7)
- Jim Steinman – keyboards (1, 2, 6), percussion (1, 2), spoken word (2), "lascivious effects" (6)
- Roger Powell – synthesizer (1, 2, 5, 6)
- Edgar Winter – saxophone (2, 4, 6)
- Max Weinberg – drums (1, 2, 6)
- John "Willie" Wilcox – drums (4, 5, 7)
- Phil "Scooter" Rizzuto – play-by-play (6)
- Ellen Foley – lead vocals (6), backing vocals (1, 2, 4, 6)
- Rory Dodd – backing vocals (all except 4)
- Gene Orloff – concert master (7)
- Marcia McClain – spoken word (2)
- Members of New York Philharmonic and Philadelphia Orchestra – orchestra (7)

== Charts ==
=== Weekly charts ===
Chart (1977–1982)	Peak position
Australian Albums (Kent Music Report)	1
Canada Top Albums/CDs (RPM)	5
Dutch Albums (Album Top 100)	1
German Albums (Offizielle Top 100)	11
New Zealand Albums (RMNZ)	1
Swedish Albums (Sverigetopplistan)	13
UK Albums (Official Charts)	9
US Billboard 200	14

Chart (2021)	Peak position
Belgian Albums (Ultratop Flanders)	191

Chart (2022)	Peak position
Australian Albums (ARIA)	1
Austrian Albums (Ö3 Austria)	30
Belgian Albums (Ultratop Flanders)	16
Belgian Albums (Ultratop Wallonia)	93
Canadian Albums (Billboard)	6
Irish Albums (Official Charts)	1
Swiss Albums (Schweizer Hitparade)	9
UK Albums (Official Charts)	3
US Billboard 200	13
US Top Rock Albums (Billboard)	1

=== Year-end charts ===
Chart (1978)	Position
Canada Top Albums/CDs (RPM)	6
Dutch Albums (Album Top 100)	83
German Albums (Offizielle Top 100)	22
New Zealand Albums (RMNZ)	3
US Billboard 200	13

Chart (1979)	Position
Dutch Albums (Album Top 100)	1
US Billboard 200	70

Chart (1991)	Position
Australian Albums (ARIA)	50
UK Albums (OCC)	66

Chart (1993)	Position
Australian Albums (ARIA)	12

Chart (1994)	Position
Dutch Albums (Album Top 100)	59

Chart (2007)	Position
Australian Albums (ARIA)	82

== Certifications and sales ==
Region	Certification	Certified units/sales
Australia (ARIA)	26× Platinum	1,820,000^{‡}
Canada (Music Canada)	2× Diamond	2,000,000^{^}
Denmark (IFPI Danmark)	2× Platinum	40,000^{‡}
Germany (BVMI)	Platinum	500,000^{^}
Iceland	—	20,000
Netherlands (NVPI)	Platinum	500,000
New Zealand (RMNZ)	17× Platinum	255,000^{^}
United Kingdom (BPI)	12× Platinum	3,600,000^{‡}
United States (RIAA)	14× Platinum	14,000,000^{^}
^{^} Shipments figures based on certification alone.^{‡} Sales+streaming figures based on certification alone.

== See also ==
- 1977 in music
- Meat Loaf discography
- Wagnerian rock
- List of best-selling albums in the United States
- List of best-selling albums in the United Kingdom
- List of best-selling albums in Australia
- List of best-selling albums in the Netherlands
- List of best-selling albums in New Zealand
