= Sarah Durkee =

American singer

Sarah Durkee is an American writer, lyricist, and humorist.

Durkee and her husband Paul Jacobs are the creators of the theme song for the popular PBS literacy education series, Between the Lions, and have also written many other musical numbers for the program. Since the mid-1980s, Durkee has also been a frequent contributor of scripts and songs to children's TV series, such as Sesame Street, Square One Television, Arthur, Dora the Explorer, Wonder Pets, Lomax, the Hound of Music and Octonauts. She and Paul Jacobs collaborated on several songs for Meat Loaf, including the 1984 hit "Modern Girl." Both Durkee and Jacobs are veterans of the National Lampoon comedy troupe from the 1970s (she as an actress, he as music director). In January 2006, her first novel for young adults, The Fruit Bowl Project, was published by Delacorte Press. Its target audience is students in grades 5–8.

Sarah Durkee has won five Daytime Emmy Awards for her writing contributions to Sesame Street and Between the Lions, for both script and songwriting. She lives in New York City.
