= Dead Ringer for Love =

- UK 7" single cover

Single by Meat Loaf featuring Cher

from the album Dead Ringer
- B-side: "More Than You Deserve"
- Released: November 20, 1981 (UK)
- Recorded: 1981
- Genre: Heartland rock
- Length: 4:20
- Label: Epic
- Songwriter: Jim Steinman
- Producers: Jim Steinman; Jimmy Iovine

Meat Loaf singles chronology
"Bat Out of Hell" (1979)	"Dead Ringer for Love" (1981)	"I'm Gonna Love Her for Both of Us" (1981)

Cher singles chronology
"Holdin' Out For Love" (1979)	"Dead Ringer for Love" (1981)	"Rudy" (1982)

Music video
- Video on YouTube

"Dead Ringer for Love" is a song performed by American singer Meat Loaf and American singer-actress Cher from Meat Loaf's second rock album, Dead Ringer. The song was written by Jim Steinman and is one of only two tracks on the album produced by Steinman and Jimmy Iovine.

== Song information ==
The song was originally written by Jim Steinman, Tony Hendra, and Sean Kelly as the theme for the short-lived television comedy series Delta House, sung by Michael Simmons. Steinman reworked the melody into the song "Dead Ringer for Love" for the Dead Ringer album, while portions of the lyrics would later appear in his "Tonight Is What It Means to Be Young".

The song was performed live many times by Meat Loaf but never by Cher. There is no footage of Cher and Meat Loaf ever performing this song live together, although Cher appeared in the music video. The song performed by Meat Loaf is available in two live CDs: Live Around the World and Bat out of Hell: Live with the Melbourne Symphony Orchestra, with Cher's part performed by Patti Russo.

The track was released in the United Kingdom in November 1981 and debuted at number 63 on the UK Singles Chart. It slowly climbed the chart and peaked at number five in early February 1982. It later appeared on Meat Loaf's Hits out of Hell and on some Bat Out of Hell re-releases, and in Cher's Greatest Hits: 1965–1992 and Essential Collection compilations

Allmusic editor William Ruhlmann later highlighted the song. Also, Donald A. Guarisco retrospectively praised the lyrics: "The tongue-in-cheek lyrics tell the tale of a guy who’s realized he cant 'live by rock ‘n’ roll and brew alone' and sets his sights on his ideal woman (...) The lyric devotes equal time to his vampy object of affection". He added that, "This unique blend of vocal and instrumental firepower makes 'Dead Ringer For Love' feel like a long-lost outtake from the Grease soundtrack on steroids."

== Charts and certifications ==
=== Weekly charts ===
Chart (1981/1982)	Peak position
Australian Singles (Kent Music Report)	65
Belgium (Ultratop 50 Flanders)	33
Ireland (IRMA)	2
Israel (IBA)	19
Luxembourg (Radio Luxembourg)	13
Netherlands (Single Top 100)	39
Spain Top 40 Radio	17
Sweden (Sverigetopplistan)	16
UK Singles (Official Charts)	5

=== Year-end charts ===
Chart (1982)	Position
UK Singles (Official Charts Company)	48

=== Certifications ===
Certifications for "Dead Ringer for Love"
Region	Certification	Certified units/sales
United Kingdom (BPI) digital, sales since 2004	Gold	400,000^{‡}
United Kingdom (BPI) physical release, sales in 1981	Silver	250,000^{^}
^{^} Shipments figures based on certification alone.^{‡} Sales+streaming figures based on certification alone.
