= Paul Jacobs (composer) =

American composer and musician

Paul Ross Jacobs is an American composer and musician, most known for his work with Meat Loaf and his band, Neverland Express.

== Biography ==
Paul Ross Jacobs was born in New York City. He attended the Juilliard School and as a child, played at Carnegie Hall, on television and for Radio Free Europe. After watching The Beatles on The Ed Sullivan Show, he started playing guitar. He worked as a session musician during his high school years and later on with Meat Loaf, Roy Buchanan, and Edgar Winter.

=== Early career ===
Jacobs' association with the National Lampoon came through Christopher Guest, who had written a large chunk of the first National Lampoon album, Radio Dinner. Guest was working as a session musician and met Jacobs when they were both performing at the same session. Guest was developing his own songs at the time and asked Jacobs to contribute, and a musical association was born. When Guest was tapped for National Lampoon's Lemmings in 1973, he brought Jacobs on board.

Jacobs was musical director of the show and album Lemmings. As well as being musical director for the production, he played guitar and piano, and sang lead vocals on several songs.

He also appeared on the Lampoon album Goodbye Pop 1952-1976.

=== From comedy to rock ===
After serving as musical director and cast member of The National Lampoon Show, Jacobs moved on from Lampoon-related activities and did a stint in the often-intertwined worlds of musical theater and rock and roll. In 1977, when Jim Steinman staged a workshop production of his early musical Neverland, Jacobs served as musical director and co-arranged the show's score. A year later, Jacobs joined Meat Loaf as a pianist and background vocalist, later becoming album writer and guitarist.

=== Children's TV ===
In 1988, following his departure from active live touring with Meat Loaf, Jacobs and his wife Sarah Durkee, began the task of writing songs for Sesame Street. As of 2008, they have written over 100. As of the early 2000s, Jacobs has served as musical director for the PBS show "Between the Lions" along with Sarah, and they have won several Emmys for their work on that show, most recently the 2007 Emmy for "Best Original Song in an Animated Children's Series." Jacobs was nominated again for a Daytime Emmy Award for Best Music Direction and Composition in 2011.

=== Later work ===
In 2000, Jacobs won the Van Cliburn Institute Amateur Piano Concerto Competition.
