= Whistle Down the Wind =

Whistle Down the Wind may refer to:

== Literature ==
- Whistle Down the Wind (novel), a 1959 novella by Mary Hayley Bell

== Film ==
- Whistle Down the Wind (film), a 1961 British film adaptation of the 1959 novel of the same name, directed by Bryan Forbes

== Musicals ==
- Whistle Down the Wind (1989 musical), an adaptation by Richard Taylor and Russell Labey, based on the novel and film of the same name
- Whistle Down the Wind (1996 musical), an adaptation by Andrew Lloyd Webber, based on the film of the same name

== Music ==
- "Whistle Down the Wind" (Nick Heyward song), 1983
- "Whistle Down the Wind", a 1992 song by Tom Waits from Bone Machine
- Whistle Down the Wind (album), a 2018 album by Joan Baez named after its first track, a cover of Tom Waits' song
