= Whistle Down the Wind (1989 musical) =

Whistle Down the Wind is a musical based on the 1959 novel by Mary Hayley Bell, adapted by Richard Taylor and Russell Labey, with music and lyrics by Richard Taylor.

== The story ==
=== Act one ===
December in the late 1950s in a Lancashire village. Out of the darkness and howling wind, a voice sings "Behold! For the day of the Lord will come." (PROLOGUE) Someone strikes a match - it is Eddie, a labourer on the Bostock farm, who is carrying a sack from which kittens' miaows can be heard. He drops the sack into a canal. Cathy, Nan and Charles, Mr. Bostock's children, watch him from a hiding place and, as Eddie exits, they rescue the kittens. Caring for them will be difficult; they can not show them to Dad, as he will give them back to Eddie (THE KITTENS). Charles tries unsuccessfully to give one to his friend, Jackie Greenwood, and to a Salvation Army woman. However, as nobody wants them, they eventually decide to keep all three in a barn on the farm.

Outside the barn, Cathy, the eldest, makes the other two promise not to tell anyone of the kittens' existence. Nan asks who is going to look after them and Charles, echoing the bland sentiments of the Salvation Army woman, says that "Jesus will". Cathy tells him not to be daft as Jesus can not look after them because he is dead. Nan, shocked, says that He will come and get Cathy for saying such things. Cathy is not impressed and, after sending the others to the farmhouse, enters the barn. She goes to a large mound of hay and buries the kittens' basket in it. Suddenly a man bolts upright from out of the hay and stares wide-eyed at Cathy. He is delirious and his clothes and hands are all bloody from a wound in his side. Shocked, Cathy asks who he is and he, also shocked, utters "Jesus Christ!" and collapses. Cathy freezes in horror.

In the farmhouse, Dad is talking to Auntie, his sister; since the death of his wife she has looked after him and the children. Cathy rushes in, shaken from her experience. She tells Nan that she has seen Jesus in their barn. Over dinner Cathy sings of what she has discovered, wondering why Jesus has picked on her (CATHY'S PRAYER).

The next morning, Cathy and Nan, having refused to tell Charles their secret, go to the barn. The Man is asleep and Nan remarks that she does not feel afraid (FUNNY, IT DOESN'T FEEL STRANGE). Charles suddenly enters. He has come to play with his kitten and sees The Man. Cathy and Nan tell him that The Man is Jesus and make him swear not to tell. The Man wakes up and, after accepting some food, falls back to sleep.

Sunday morning. Parents and children arrive at the Church and are greeted by the Vicar. The children are sent off to Sunday School. We learn from the village policeman that an escaped murderer is on the loose in the district (WHEN YOU'RE LOOKING FOR A MURDERER). At the Sunday School, Miss Lodge, the teacher, is asked by Cathy what would happen if Jesus came back —could they stop Him being crucified a second time? Miss Lodge says that people would have to try harder this time to stop that from happening and that they should praise Him and follow Him.

The three children get more food for The Man and laugh about how everyone will want to come to see Jesus once they know that He is in their barn — even THE MAYOR OF BURNLEY! At the barn door there is gathered a group of other children — Charles has obviously not been able to keep the secret. Cathy makes the other children swear not to tell and they file into the barn. The Man is getting better, but is still in pain from his injury. Cathy asks Charles to go back to the house to get some cloth to clean The Man's wound. The other children, after shyly saying hello, ask him to tell a story. He is handed a magazine and a bible, but chooses to read from the magazine. Whilst he is doing so, the children sing of how they will protect Jesus from danger this time (HYMN). Suddenly there is a noise outside — it is Mr. Bostock with Charles. The children hide The Man in the hay as Dad and Charles enter. Dad wants to know what the children are doing there, but on seeing the bible thinks that Cathy has been reading to them. He asks Cathy if she has been talking to any strangers and warns her to be careful. When Dad goes The Man emerges from the hay and Cathy asks the children to go because he is tired. The Man thanks Cathy for not giving him away and she helps to clean his wounded side. He asks her why the children are helping him. She replies that it is because they love Him. As she turns to go, she gives him a picture of Jesus that she took from the Sunday School, and says that it is a picture of Him.

=== Act two ===
23 December. The villagers are still alarmed about the convict and Dad lectures Cathy once more about not speaking to strangers (OPENING SEQUENCE). In the school play-ground, Raymond, the village bully, on being told by the children that they have seen Jesus, captures and bullies Jackie Greenwood into saying three times that he has not seen Him.

In the barn Cathy gives The Man more food. He asks for cigarettes, somewhat to Cathy's surprise, and says that he must be going soon. Charles enters — he has come to see Spider, his kitten. On finding it dead he runs outside, distraught, followed by Cathy. He tells her that The Man cannot be Jesus as He would never have let the kitten die; Cathy comforts Charles and tells him that it is Jesus — she just knows (SPIDER).

At the Sunday School that evening the children enact out THE NATIVITY to their bored parents, who seem more interested in criticising each other than watching the play. After polite applause, everyone attends to the tea that has been laid out. Cathy, thinking of Charles' kitten, asks the Vicar why it is that Jesus lets some things die before their time. The Vicar gives a very evasive reply and Charles and Cathy realise that he does not know. The other children ask Cathy if they can go and see The Man and, using the distraction caused by DAD'S PARTY PIECE (Ione On A Moor), they quietly slip out.

At the Barn the twelve children sit around The Man and eat their party cakes. The Man is moved by the love and faith that the children have for him. At that moment there is a loud banging on the door — it is Raymond. He has heard them talking to The Man, and, when they refuse to let him in, tells them that "they will be sorry" and dashes off. The Man, realising that Raymond has gone to tell the adults about him, says that he will be going later that evening. The children are upset, and as they silently eat their cakes The Man and Elizabeth, one of the children, put their feelings into words (ANGELS). However, when the children start to exit, The Man says that he might not go tonight and they leave happier. The Man, realising that he has not got time to escape, locks the door from the inside and gives vent to his emotions (I DON'T KNOW WHAT THEY'RE WAITING TO HEAR).

At the farmhouse Cathy, Nan and Charles burst in on Dad and Raymond. Raymond leaves, having told Dad that he heard a strange man talking to the children in the barn. The children tell Dad that they will only tell him The Man's identity if he promises to keep it secret. After some wavering, he makes the promise, but when they tell him it becomes obvious that he does not believe them (THE SECRET). The phone rings — it is the Police Inspector, whom Raymond has also told — and Cathy, on impulse, darts out of the door to warn The Man of his imminent arrest.

Standing outside an opening at the back of the barn Cathy pleads with The Man to leave before it is too late, but he refuses (PLEASE, JESUS ... ). She throws some cigarettes and matches through the hole and says that she will stay with him. Police cars, their sirens blaring, can be heard approaching. Nan appears at Cathy's side and tells her to go to the front of the barn where there is frenetic activity. Policemen and the children's fathers are all rushing about in the darkness trying to find some light. When they find a torch the light shows up a mass of children's faces. All the children of the village have amassed themselves in front of the barn door to stop the arrest (FOLLOW! FOLLOW! FOLLOW HIM!). They resolutely refuse to move and link arms. Suddenly a policeman notices that smoke is pouring out of the barn's roof and raises the alarm (THE FIRE). Despite the fire the children huddle calmly and defiantly together. When the fire has been extinguished, Dad ushers his children into the gutted interior where there is no sign of The Man. There is, however, something Dad wants them to see and he shines his torch on to a large cross which has been painted on the wall. The children realise that this is The Man's goodbye and that he is now finally free. (HYMN - Reprise).

== Production History ==
The musical was originally produced by National Youth Music Theatre and has since had a few more productions with the same company.

=== 2015 Off-West End ===
The professional premiere of Taylor's Whistle Down the Wind opened at the Union Theatre, London and ran from 28 January to 21 February 2015. It was directed by the Union's artistic director Sasha Regan and designed by Nik Corrall.

=== 2019 Off-West End Revival ===
In Winter 2019, Sasha Regan revived her production of Taylor's musical at the new Union Theatre in Southwark. The production was designed by Justin Williams. It ran from 28 November to 21 December 2019. Different from its previous all adult production, this 2019 revival featured an ensemble of children from the Union Theatre's Youth Theatre. It also featured members of the cast as actor-musicians.

== Roles and principal casts ==
=== Cast ===
Character	Original Off-West End Cast (2015)	Off-West End Revival Cast (2019)
The Man	Callum Mcardle	Callum Mcardle
Cathy Bostock	Grace Osborn	Sadie Levett
Nan Bostock	Imelda Warren-Green	Tara Lucas
Charles Bostock	Alex James Ellison	George Hankers
Dad	Chris Coleman	Stuart Simons
Auntie	Kathryn Hamilton-Hall	Fiona Tong
Raymond	Joshua Lewindon	Will Sutcliffe
Vicar	Bryan Hodgson	Eoin McKenna
Policeman	Romero Clark	Conor O'Rourke
Miss Lodge	Danielle Morris	Louise Kempson
Jackie Greenwood	Sebastion Thomas	Laura Jeffries
David Edwards	Harry Wright	Adrian J. Mercer
Ruby		Olivia Wormald

== About the staging ==
Whistle Down the Wind on stage largely follows the pattern set by the film and is extremely episodic. It is vital that the telling of the story is not halted for scene changes — they must be swift. My advice is to keep it simple and rely heavily on lighting. A stone cross war memorial will suggest the village; a table, chairs and perhaps a dresser on an open stage "closed-down" with lighting is more than enough for the kitchen. The original production used a three-sided truck, one side of which was on hinges and could be opened. It was the hinged side that contained within it the barn door — when this side of the truck was closed we were outside the barn and when it was open, inside the barn. The truck could also be wheeled round to show other sides for the Sunday School etcetera. The barn was collapsible so that it looked like a skeleton of rafters for the final scene, but there are simpler ways of convincing the audience of the fire — just strike the hay, props and agricultural paraphernalia you might be using as set dressing. For the big production numbers, which are set in a variety of simultaneous locations, use a lot of cues, bouncing at the appropriate moments from one area to another to define the street, the church, the Sunday school stage etcetera.

The young cast members must act and sing like real children caught up in a story they accept with a natural innocence and faith. Cathy must establish herself as the leader of the "Disciples" and must be an actress capable of the emotional outpourings at the end of the play. The Man should be an attractive actor with both charm and menace — he must be believable as both a murderer and Jesus Christ.

At no time in the play is the audience told, one way or the other, if The Man is the convict or Christ. Providing the "Disciples" are not too holy, knowing or artificial they will be convincing. After two years of touring the original production not a single member of the audience ever said to me that they didn't believe that the children would believe the man in the barn was Jesus. I'm convinced that is the way to make this great story hold its magic.

—Russell Labey

== Musical numbers ==
=== Act one ===
- (PROLOGUE)
- (THE KITTENS)
- (CATHY'S PRAYER)
- (FUNNY, IT DOESN'T FEEL STRANGE)
- (WHEN YOU'RE LOOKING FOR A MURDERER)
- (THE MAYOR OF BURNLEY)
- (HYMN)

=== Act two ===
- (SPIDER)
- (THE NATIVITY)
- (ANGELS)
- (I DON'T KNOW WHAT THEY'RE WAITING TO HEAR)
- (THE SECRET)
- (PLEASE, JESUS ... )
- (FOLLOW! FOLLOW! FOLLOW HIM!)
- (THE FIRE)
- (HYMN - Reprise)

== Characters ==
=== Children ===
- Cathy Bostock - Eldest sister of Nan & Charles
- Nan Bostock - Sister of Cathy & Charles
- Charles Bostock - Younger brother of Cathy & Nan
- David Edwards
- Elizabeth
- Jackie Greenwood
- Jenny
- Jo
- Laurie
- Robert

=== Adults ===
- The Man
- Dad - Father of Cathy, Nan & Charles
- Auntie - Dad's sister
- Policeman - The father of Raymond
- Vicar
- Miss Lodge - Sunday School teacher
- Salvation Army Woman
- Mrs. Pembridge - Village mother
- Eddie - Farm labourer
- Sam
- Stephen
- Raymond - Village bully, son of the Policeman
- Village Children, Mothers, Fathers, Policemen (Note: The final scene requires a large chorus of children in addition to the "Disciples" listed above - the original NYMT production used 30)

== Instrumentation ==
- Flute db. Alto Flute
- Horn in F
- Keyboards (Electric Piano db. Synthesizer)
- 2 Violins
- Viola
- Cello

=== Percussions ===
- Bass Drum
- Bell Tree
- Cow Bell
- Glockenspiel
- Side Drum
- Sleigh Bells
- 2 Suspended Cymbals (medium, large)
- Tam Tam
- Timpani
- 3 Tom Toms (high, medium, low)
- Triangle
- Tubular Bells
- 2 Woodblocks (high, low)
- Xylophone
