= No Matter What (Boyzone song) =

1998 single by Boyzone

Single by Boyzone

from the album Songs from Whistle Down the Wind and Where We Belong
- B-side: "Where Have You Been?"; "She's the One"
- Released: 3 August 1998
- Studio: Skratch, Metropolis, Sarm West (London, England); FLM (Hollywood, California); Barking Dog (New York City)
- Length: 4:34
- Label: Polydor
- Composer: Andrew Lloyd Webber
- Lyricist: Jim Steinman
- Producers: Jim Steinman; Andrew Lloyd Webber; Nigel Wright

Boyzone singles chronology
"All That I Need" (1998)	"No Matter What" (1998)	"I Love the Way You Love Me" (1998)

Music video
- "No Matter What" on YouTube

"No Matter What" is a song from the 1996 musical Whistle Down the Wind that was popularised by Irish boyband Boyzone in 1998 when they recorded it to tie in with the show's first UK production. The song was written by Andrew Lloyd Webber and Jim Steinman, who also produced the song with Nigel Wright. The song was also included on the US edition of the soundtrack to the 1999 film Notting Hill, and it was serviced to American contemporary hit radio on 10 May 1999.

The song became Boyzone's fourth number-one on the UK Singles Chart, with its three-week stay atop the chart making it Boyzone's longest-running number-one single as well as being their best-selling UK single, selling 1.4 million copies there as of February 2025. It was also the first ever winner of the annual The Record of the Year award held on ITV in December 1998. It also became the band's first and only song to have any chart success in the US. In New Zealand, the song spent six non-consecutive weeks at number one and ended 1998 as the country's most successful single.

== Background ==
"No Matter What" was written by Andrew Lloyd Webber and Jim Steinman for the 1996 musical Whistle Down the Wind, based on the book by Mary Hayley Bell, to be sung by a group of children at the end of Act 1. In the musical, the song is about the naive adoration by the children towards someone they believe to be Jesus (in reality, an escaped prisoner); however, for the version recorded by Boyzone, the lyrics have been modified significantly to become a teenage romantic love song, though a religious reference is retained (“If only prayers were answered/Then we would hear God say”).

Ronan Keating said that Stephen Gately was a fan of Lloyd Webber and wanted to be involved in West End theatre in some way. He approached Lloyd Webber for a song, and was given "No Matter What" to record. Gately first recorded a solo version before the other members of Boyzone became involved to record the song. Lloyd Webber, Steinman and Nigel Wright produced the song, with additional production by Franglen & Lupino.

According to Lloyd Webber, the manager of Boyzone Louis Walsh disliked the song and did not want to release the song as an A-side. Lloyd Webber chanced upon Richard Park from Capital Radio at an event; later that day Park asked Lloyd Webber if he had any new material, and Lloyd Webber played for him the song that the label and manager of Boyzone did not want released. Park said: "Listen to Capital Radio in five hours' time because I'm playing this because this is the biggest hit that they will ever have." Park played the song over the station and it became one of Boyzone’s biggest hits.

== Critical reception ==
British newspaper Birmingham Evening Mail wrote, "Tina Arena has already had one hit from the Andrew Lloyd Webber/Jim Steinman stage musical 'Whistle Down The Wind' - but expect this one to do even better. As a change Stephen Gately shares lead vocals on what is essentially a simple but hugely memorable ballad. Prepare that number one spot now." A reviewer from Daily Record noted that it "shows a depth of maturity that bodes well for the future", later adding that the band "are continuing their efforts to evolve into a group which will be able to appeal to an older audience."

== Music video ==
A music video was made to accompany the song. It was filmed at the Roundhouse in London and shows an African man leaving in a hot air balloon. The members of Boyzone are standing on the ground watching him depart, joined by a shirtless boy with a guitar and an apple, a girl in a white tank top and grey trousers, and an East Asian woman. The African man eventually drops a small golden crucifix, in reference to the Christian themes of Whistle Down the Wind. An alternate version was later produced as a tie-in for Notting Hill, using alternate footage of Boyzone from the same shoot as the original video and clips from the film.

== Track listings ==
- UK CD1
1. "No Matter What" – 4:34
2. "Where Have You Been?" – 3:08
3. "All That I Need" (Phil Da Costa's Oxygen edit) – 3:35
- UK CD2 and Australian CD single
1. "No Matter What" – 4:34
2. "She's the One" – 3:12
3. "Live Interview with Boyzone" (CD ROM video)
- UK cassette single
1. "No Matter What" – 4:34
2. "Where Have You Been?" – 3:08
- European CD single
1. "No Matter What" – 4:34
2. "She's the One" – 3:12
- European maxi-CD and Japanese CD single
1. "No Matter What" (album version) – 4:34
2. "Father and Son" – 2:47
3. "Words" – 3:55

== Credits and personnel ==
Credits are lifted from the By Request album booklet.

Studios

- Recorded at Skratch Studios, Metropolis Studios, Sarm West Studios (London, England), FLM Studios (Hollywood, California), and Barking Dog Studios (New York City)

Personnel

- Andrew Lloyd Webber – music, production, executive production
- Jim Steinman – lyrics, production, executive production
- Tracy Ackerman – backing vocals (London)
- Andy Caine – backing vocals (London)
- Friðrik Karlsson – guitar (London)
- Michael Thompson – electric and acoustic guitars (Los Angeles)
- Nigel Wright – keyboards (London), production
- Lee McCutcheon – keyboard programming (London)
- Franglen & Lupino – additional production, arrangement
  - Angela Lupino – bass (Los Angeles)
  - Simon Franglen – keyboards, programming, engineering (Los Angeles)
- Steve Rinkoff – mixing, engineering (London)
- Mick Guzauski – mixing (Los Angeles)
- Robin Sellars – engineering (London)
- Alex Black – engineering assistant (London)
- Tom – engineering assistant (Los Angeles)

== Charts ==
=== Weekly charts ===
Chart (1998–1999)	Peak position
Australia (ARIA)	5
Austria (Ö3 Austria Top 40)	3
Belgium (Ultratop 50 Flanders)	2
Belgium (Ultratop 50 Wallonia)	3
Canada Top Singles (RPM)	51
Canada Adult Contemporary (RPM)	11
Denmark (IFPI)	1
Estonia (Eesti Top 20)	12
Europe (Eurochart Hot 100)	2
Europe (European Hit Radio)	5
Finland (Suomen virallinen lista)	19
Finland Airplay (Radiosoittolista)	13
France (SNEP)	43
Germany (GfK)	2
Greece (IFPI Greece)	1
Hungary (Mahasz)	5
Iceland (Íslenski Listinn Topp 40)	15
Ireland (IRMA)	1
Italy (FIMI)	10
Italy (Musica e dischi)	21
Latvia (Latvijas Top 20)	2
Netherlands (Dutch Top 40)	1
Netherlands (Single Top 100)	1
Netherlands Airplay (Music & Media)	1
New Zealand (Recorded Music NZ)	1
Norway (VG-lista)	1
Scottish Singles Sales (Official Charts)	1
Spain Airplay (Top 40 Radio)	12
Sweden (Sverigetopplistan)	2
Switzerland (Schweizer Hitparade)	2
Taiwan (IFPI)	1
UK Singles (Official Charts)	1
UK Airplay (Music Week)	1
US Bubbling Under Hot 100 (Billboard)	16
US Adult Contemporary (Billboard)	12
US Pop Airplay (Billboard)	35
US Adult Contemporary (Radio & Records)	9
US CHR/Pop Top 50 (Radio & Records)	32

Chart (2009)	Peak position
UK Singles (OCC)	88

Chart (2025)	Peak position
UK Singles Downloads (Official Charts)	79
UK Singles Sales (OCC)	81

=== Year-end charts ===
Chart (1998)	Position
Australia (ARIA)	60
Austria (Ö3 Austria Top 40)	24
Belgium (Ultratop 50 Flanders)	9
Belgium (Ultratop 50 Wallonia)	29
Europe (Eurochart Hot 100)	10
Europe (European Hit Radio)	31
Germany (Media Control)	29
Latvia (Latvijas Top 50)	37
Netherlands (Dutch Top 40)	7
Netherlands (Single Top 100)	2
New Zealand (RIANZ)	1
Sweden (Hitlistan)	7
Switzerland (Schweizer Hitparade)	21
Taiwan (Hito Radio)	14
UK Singles (OCC)	4
UK Airplay (Music Week)	19

Chart (1999)	Position
Australia (ARIA)	53
Austria (Ö3 Austria Top 40)	31
Canada Adult Contemporary (RPM)	78
Europe (Eurochart Hot 100)	63
Germany (Media Control)	47
Netherlands (Dutch Top 40)	119
Netherlands (Single Top 100)	66
Switzerland (Schweizer Hitparade)	26
US Adult Contemporary (Billboard)	37
US Adult Contemporary (Radio & Records)	34

=== Decade-end charts ===
Chart (1990–1999)	Position
Austria (Ö3 Austria Top 40)	73
Ireland (IRMA)	61
Netherlands (Dutch Top 40)	19
UK Singles (OCC)	23

== Certifications and sales ==
Region	Certification	Certified units/sales
Australia (ARIA)	Platinum	70,000^{^}
Austria (IFPI Austria)	Gold	25,000^{*}
Belgium (BRMA)	Platinum	50,000^{*}
Denmark (IFPI Danmark)	Gold	45,000^{‡}
Germany (BVMI)	Platinum	500,000^{^}
Netherlands (NVPI)	2× Platinum	150,000^{^}
New Zealand (RMNZ) Physical	Platinum	10,000^{*}
New Zealand (RMNZ) Digital	Gold	15,000^{‡}
Norway (IFPI Norway)	2× Platinum	
Sweden (GLF)	Platinum	30,000^{^}
Switzerland (IFPI Switzerland)	Gold	25,000^{^}
United Kingdom (BPI)	2× Platinum	1,400,000
^{^} Shipments figures based on certification alone.^{‡} Sales+streaming figures based on certification alone.

== Release history ==
Region	Date	Format(s)	Label(s)	Ref(s).
United Kingdom	3 August 1998	CD; cassette	Polydor	
Japan	6 January 1999	CD	Polydor	
United States	10 May 1999	Contemporary hit radio	Island; Ravenous	

== Other versions ==
The song was performed by Meat Loaf as part of a medley with another number from Whistle Down the Wind, "Home by Now", in his 1998 compilation album The Very Best of Meat Loaf and individually as a B-side to his 1998 single "A Kiss Is a Terrible Thing to Waste", and to his 1999 single "Is Nothing Sacred". Luciano Pavarotti performed the song as a duet with Boyzone in the live concert and album Pavarotti & Friends for Guatemala and Kosovo.
