= Mark Weedon =

Mark Weedon may refer to:

- Mark Weedon (cricketer)
- Mark Weedon (rugby union)
