= Sky West and Crooked =

1966 British film by John Mills

- Theatrical release poster
- Directed by: John Mills
- Written by: Mary Hayley Bell; John Prebble
- Produced by: Jack Hanbury
- Starring: Hayley Mills; Ian McShane; Annette Crosbie; Laurence Naismith
- Cinematography: Arthur Ibbetson
- Edited by: Gordon Hales
- Music by: Malcolm Arnold
- Production companies: The Rank Organisation; John Mills Productions
- Distributed by: J. Arthur Rank Film Distributors
- Release date: January 1966 (UK)
- Running time: 106 minutes
- Country: United Kingdom
- Language: English

Sky West and Crooked (U.S. title: Gypsy Girl; also known as Bats with baby Faces) is a 1966 British romantic drama film starring Hayley Mills. The film was directed by her father, John Mills, and was co-written by her mother, Mary Hayley Bell.

The title derives from a West Country term for someone who is "not quite right in the head".

== Plot ==
In a small, isolated village in South West England, seven-year-old Brydie White is running with a playmate, Julian, who trips and falls. He is accidentally killed by his father's loaded shotgun that he was playing with. Brydie is injured with a wound to her head, causing some intellectual disability.

Seven years later, Brydie can remember the boy but cannot remember the accident. She regularly visits Julian's grave, but is not sure why she does. She has an argument with the old gravedigger who aggressively insists that her dog is not allowed in the graveyard. She is rescued by a young man whom the old man calls a "gypo" and a "tinker".

Her mother is a sad, lonely and dysfunctional person who drinks heavily. Brydie is a tomboy with a fascination for death and dead animals, and spends her time climbing trees and being a nuisance to the adults in the small village where she lives. She spends much of her time with the local children and tells them that all dead things should be buried, including animals. They agree to go round the village collecting up all the dead animals they can find and plan to bury them all in the graveyard that night.

It becomes apparent that some of the adults, especially the dead boy's father who blames Brydie for his death, and has never forgiven her for it, are convinced that Brydie is a bad influence on the other children. They think that something should be done to discipline her, agreeing that her mother is not a good role model and to be looked down upon. Their negative attitude and behaviour are compounded by their disapproval of her mother not being married to Brydie's late father. The Vicar wakes the next morning to find his graveyard full of little graves the children have made to bury the animals, and tries to explain to Brydie that because they have no souls, they cannot be buried on consecrated ground. Understanding her simplicity and good intentions, he asks Julian's father if he would give a small corner of his land to the children to have their own animal graveyard. However, the father is embittered and confronts Brydie, accusing her of murdering Julian seven years earlier. Horrified and scared that it might be true, she runs in a fit of hysteria and falls in the river where she is rescued by the gypsy boy, Roibin. When he carries her into the nearby gypsy camp, his grandmother says "you can't keep away from women, can you?".

The gypsies do not want her there, knowing that it will only bring trouble, but seeing the fevered state of Brydie, the Grandmother takes her in and, begrudgingly, nurses her well. During the weeks Brydie is away, her mum drinks more heavily, distraught over Brydie's disappearance. She has a heart attack and dies. The Police interview the gypsies, but they deny knowledge of the girl. When police dogs are brought in, they lead police to the edge of the river.

As Brydie recovers, she and Roibin become close, and he helps her to face and talk about what happened with Julian. He asks her to stay with him and the gypsies when they move on. She says that she couldn't leave her mother and needs to go home. He pledges his love for her and they kiss in a meadow. The village children find them there and tell her that her mother died during her absence. Upset, she decides to go to see her mother's grave and, realising that she has nothing to stay home for, promises to return to Roibin. He teaches her how to read sticks that will tell her which direction the gypsies will have gone if they leave before she gets back. She shares a final kiss with Roibin and leaves with the children.

The children run to tell the Vicar that Brydie is at her mother's grave, and he takes her to his house, promising to look after her. Brydie insists that she must return to Roibin, as she has nothing to stay for. The Vicar promises to tell Roibin to come and collect Brydie in the morning as she is still exhausted and unwell. Relieved, Brydie falls asleep while the Vicar asks the gravedigger to go the gypsy camp and tell Roibin to come and get Brydie in the morning.

The gravedigger goes to the camp, but tells the gypsies to leave immediately, as they are unwanted, and threatens to call the Police to arrest them for kidnapping Brydie. They are angry at this and begin to pack up straight away. Roibin tries to make the gypsies stay until Brydie returns so that she can go with them, but they attack him, blaming and beating him for the unwanted trouble. They do not want her with them.

By late morning, the vicar is convinced that Roibin is not coming and agrees with his wife that Brydie will probably be institutionalised. Brydie convinces the Vicar that Roibin loves her, and shows him a special token that Roibin made for her of their hair intertwined into an eternal ring. The vicar, Brydie, and her dog go to the campsite and find it abandoned, apart from piles of rubbish and debris. Brydie finds and follows a series of directional marker sticks left by Roibin at junctions. The Vicar follows her to make sure she is safe. She is just beginning to think that she has lost the trail when she hears the barking of another dog and sees a solitary gypsy caravan in a field. Knowing that it is Roibin, she runs to it. The vicar watches as Roibin runs to greet Brydie, knowing that this is the right life and future for her.

== Cast ==
- Hayley Mills as Brydie White
- Mandy Woollen as Brydie as a child
- Andrew Wicks as Julian Dacres
- Ian McShane as Roibin Krisenki, the gypsy boy
- Annette Crosbie as Mrs. White, Brydie's mother
- Laurence Naismith as Edwin Dacres
- Geoffrey Bayldon as Reverend Phillip Moss
- Pauline Jameson as Mrs. Moss
- Norman Bird as Mr. Cheeseman, undertaker
- June Ellis as Mrs. Cheeseman
- Hamilton Dyce as Bill Slim, grave digger
- Judith Furse as Mrs. Rigby
- Anne Blake as Mrs. Potts
- Jack Bligh as Fred Strong
- Michael Nightingale as doctor
- Dafydd Havard as schoolmaster
- Jacqueline Pearce as Camellia
- Alan Lake as Camlo
- Wyn Jones as Miller
- Cyril Chamberlain as Hubbard
- George Selway as Police Sergeant
- Fred Ferris as Police Constable
- Grace Arnold, Margaret Lacey and Kay Lyell as village women
- Rachel Thomas as gypsy grandmam
- Jabal Jones as Gerald Lawson
- Irene Bradshaw as Rachel
- Talfryn Thomas as Brand
- Hira Talfrey as Blossom
- Richard Davies as Rick
- Len Jones as Dusty
- Roland Starling as Harry
- Jessica Hobbs as Cathy
- Susan Chatham as Susie
- Robin Crewe as Chalky
- Lola Payne as Biddie
- Nicola Street as Nell
- Stephen Salt as Jakey
- Joyce Mayhead as Emm
- Anne Somerset as girl in church
- Catriona Street as gypsy girl

== Production ==
During pre-production, the film was known as Bats With Baby Faces, based on a line from a T. S. Eliot poem.

The film was shot on location in and around the village of Little Badminton in South Gloucestershire.

== Reception ==
The Monthly Film Bulletin wrote: "'This Mills family venture, with its echoes of Whistle Down the Wind and, more eccentrically, Jeux Interdits, is really very odd. Groups of children, cast it would seem for unrelenting cuteness, burble airy nothings about death and funerals; drunken parents sit glumly over their separate bottles; the villagers gather for sprints across pretty Eastmancolor fields to fresh scenes of disaster; and at the end the Church smiles on a most unpromising union of simpletons. Behind Hayley Mills' slightly shaky country accent, Ian McShane's fairground rig-out, and the overwhelming feyness of it all, lurk assumptions which in cold blood look almost sinister. John Mills lets it all rip, with even supposedly normal characters (old grave-diggers and suchlike) easily roused to melodramatic tantrums. There is even a bit of old-fashioned slam bang montage, when faces slide in and out of focus, voices thunder forbiddingly, to signal the imminent demise of poor Mrs. White."

Filmink wrote: "It was an attempt to recapture some of the magic of Whistle Down the Wind, but all the chips have to fall the right way for these sort of movies to work (i.e. sensitive character pieces) and it didn't happen; this isn't a bad picture, just not a particularly good one."
