= The Uninvited Guest =

The Uninvited Guest may refer to:

- The Uninvited Guest (1923 film), a British silent drama film directed by George Dewhurst
- The Uninvited Guest (1924 film), an American drama film directed by Ralph Ince
- The Uninvited Guest (1925 film), a 1925 Austrian silent film
- The Uninvited Guest (2004 film), a Spanish mystery thriller directed by Guillem Morales
- The Uninvited Guest (play), a 1953 play by Mary Hayley Bell
- "The Uninvited Guest" (song), a 1989 song by Marillion
- "The Uninvited Guest", a track from Mercyful Fate's 1996 album Into the Unknown
- The Uninvited Guest, a 1906 painting by English artist Eleanor Fortescue-Brickdale

== See also ==
- Uninvited Guests, a 1970 episode of the British television series Dad's Army
- Uninvited Guest, a 1999 American thriller film
- "Uninvited Guest" (song), from the 2015 album Hairless Toys by Róisín Murphy
- The Uninvited Guests (2012), the third novel by British writer Sadie Jones
