= Whistle Down the Wind (film) =

1961 British film by Bryan Forbes

- Film poster by Renato Fratini
- Directed by: Bryan Forbes
- Screenplay by: Keith Waterhouse; Willis Hall
- Based on: Whistle Down the Wind by Mary Hayley Bell
- Produced by: Richard Attenborough
- Starring: Hayley Mills; Bernard Lee; Alan Bates
- Cinematography: Arthur Ibbetson
- Edited by: Max Benedict
- Music by: Malcolm Arnold
- Production companies: Beaver Pictures; Allied Film Makers
- Distributed by: J. Arthur Rank Film Distributors
- Release date: 20 July 1961 (London)
- Running time: 99 minutes
- Country: United Kingdom
- Language: English
- Budget: £148,000

Whistle Down the Wind is a 1961 British crime drama film directed by Bryan Forbes and starring Hayley Mills, Bernard Lee and Alan Bates. It was adapted by Keith Waterhouse and Willis Hall from the 1958 novel of the same name by Mary Hayley Bell (Mills's mother).

In 2005, the Guardian included Whistle Down the Wind in a list of the fifty best family films.

== Plot ==
Three Lancashire farm children discover Arthur Blakey, a bearded fugitive hiding in their barn, and mistake him for Jesus Christ. They come to this conclusion because of their Sunday School stories and Blakey's shocked exclamation of "Jesus Christ!" when Kathy Bostock, the eldest child, accidentally discovers him. In Sunday School the children quiz their teacher and become even more convinced in their belief.

The story spreads to the other children and ten visit Blakey in the barn. While he sits in the hay in a Bethlehem-type setting, they bring him gifts and kneel as they present them. They ask for a story, wanting a Bible story, but he reads to them from a newspaper. When two adults appear, the children have to leave, and Blakey has to hide in the hay. He asks why they are helping and Kathy says "because we love you" and hands him a folded Bible picture of Jesus.

In a playground, one boy, Jackie Greenwood, gets bullied for saying he has seen Jesus. The children watch in dismay as Jackie eventually renounces his statement. When Kathy says she has seen him, the bully Raymond slaps her face.

Blakey – initially confused about why the three Bostock children are eager to protect him from adult discovery – makes no attempt to correct their mistake, especially when he discovers Kathy is determined to keep him hidden from the local police, despite the posters circulating in the nearby town that reveal he is wanted for murder.

When Blakey lets a kitten die, with no remorse, a doubt is sown in the minds of some of the children. The children quiz the vicar Mr. Reeves as to why Jesus does not save every person and animal and he says it is so the world does not get crowded.

Blakey sends Kathy to retrieve a package he has hidden. A police manhunt takes place as Kathy searches. She finds the package under a rail in a railway tunnel. This provides Blakey with a revolver.

At Charles Bostock's birthday party, his sister Nan takes an extra piece of cake and lets slip it is "for Jesus". Charles says: "it isn't Jesus, it's just a fella." Kathy's father realises the connection to the missing criminal and the police are called in to apprehend the criminal. The father waits outside the barn with a shotgun.

The children of the village, perhaps 100 of them now in on the secret, converge on the barn. Kathy sneaks behind the barn and passes a pack of cigarettes through a hole, but she has forgotten matches. She says she has not betrayed him, but the police are closing in. He forgives her and, after much prompting from her, promises she will see him again. Resigned to his fate, Blakey tosses his handgun out of the barn door and surrenders to the police.

Blakey stands arms outstretched as he is frisked. His silhouette echoes the crucifixion. Once Blakey is taken away and the crowd disperses, Kathy is approached by two very young children who ask to see Jesus. She tells them that they missed him this time, but he will be back one day.

== Cast ==
- Hayley Mills as Kathy Bostock
- Bernard Lee as Mr. Bostock
- Alan Bates as Arthur Blakey (Credited as the man)
- Diane Holgate as Nan Bostock
- Alan Barnes as Charles Bostock
- Norman Bird as Eddie
- Diane Clare as the Sunday School teacher
- Patricia Heneghan as Salvation Army girl
- John Arnatt as Superintendent Teesdale
- Elsie Wagstaff as Auntie Dorothy
- Hamilton Dyce as Mr Reeves, the vicar
- Howard Douglas as the vet
- Ronald Hines as P.C. Thurstow
- Gerald Sim as Detective Constable Wilcox
- Michael Lees as 1st Civil Defence worker
- Michael Raghan as 2nd Civil Defence worker
- May Barton as villager
- Roy Holder as Jackie Greenwood
- Barry Dean as Raymond or Patto (the teenage boy who slaps Kathy in the playground)

== Production ==
The novel Whistle Down the Wind by Mary Hayley Bell was published in 1959. Bell based the three children on her own children, Jonathan, Juliet and Hayley Mills. The novel was turned into a stage play. The film rights were bought by Bryan Forbes and Richard Attenborough, who had moved into film production. They were friends of John Mills and Mary Bell and secured Hayley Mills to play the lead. She had just made Pollyanna for Disney.

Forbes was so taken with the material that he wanted to write the script and direct. However, John Mills and Bell would not approve him. This upset Forbes, who withdrew from the project. Attenborough hired Keith Waterhouse and Willis Hall to write the script and Guy Green to direct. It was Waterhouse and Hall who decided to relocate the book's setting from Kent to Lancashire. Weeks before filming was to start, Green pulled out of the film to accept an offer at MGM. Attenborough suggested that Forbes direct, but John Mills and Bell wanted Attenborough to do it. Attenborough had no ambitions towards directing then, and knew how badly Forbes wanted the job, so he persuaded them to listen to a pitch from Forbes as to how he would do it. The pitch was successful and they gave their approval.

Alan Bates, in his first starring film role, played Arthur Blakey, the man in the barn. Local schoolchildren from the Lancashire villages around Burnley and Clitheroe were used as extras; children from Chatburn Primary School played the 'disciples'. The theme music by Malcolm Arnold became a classic. Bryan Forbes put the budget at £161,000, although other sources say it was lower.

== Release ==
The film had its world premiere at the Odeon Leicester Square on 20 July 1961. It played there for three weeks, ending its run on 9 August, three days after it began its general release in the London area.

== Reception ==
=== Critical ===
The Monthly Film Bulletin wrote: "There are two themes here. One, an embarrassingly explicit allegory of Christ's betrayal, comes straight from Mary Hayley Bell's novel. The other is the film's own illustration of a childhood world, secret and fantastic and sufficiently sturdy to withstand the intrusion of a good deal of pretentious symbolism ... Though Bernard Lee and Elsie Wagstaffe are excellent as the father and the aunt, the best moments are provided by Alan Barnes as the six-year-old with a bleak, firm line in scepticism; and by Diane Holgate as his snootily unshakable sister. Hayley Mills, caught half-way between the child's faith and the adult's disillusion, fails, through no fault of her own, to bridge the gap. The split is in the script, and she conceals the tedium which must have accompanied the brilliant coaching of the younger children with a potent, concentrated professionalism. Arthur Ibbetson's photography endows the hedges, ditches, ponds and muggy weather of the moorland locations with a beauty all their own. Bryan Forbes, directing for the first time, reveals a painstaking, often incisive talent for behaviour rather than a marked personal style."

Bosley Crowther wrote in The New York Times: "While it deals with sensitive material that might seem blasphemous to some – and, indeed, might well be embarrassing if it weren't handled with consummate skill and taste – it is beautifully simple, naturalistic and remote from religiosity as it tells, with great humor and compassion, of children and brotherly love. The story is elementary, so simple and inviting, indeed, that one wonders now why it hadn't been written long before it was recently put into a novel by Mary Hayley Bell. ... Credit for this exceptional picture goes to many ... all merit praise and affection for giving us one of the most enjoyable and heartwarming films we've ever seen."

Stanley Kauffmann of The New Republic wrote: "The story has a trickily effective beginning and a moderately effective conclusion, but no middle. Nothing really happens in the film; the kids make their initial mistake about the fugitive and after a while he is captured. That's all. The incident is not used for any poetic, religious, or ironic significance."

Alan Dent in The Illustrated London News opined: "Some brisker editing towards the end would . . . have resulted in an even more convincing film. But . . . Whistle Down the Wind is an admirable and prizeable production. The subject is audacious but it has been approached and handled with marvellous care and almost complete success".

Filmink called it "a complete commercial and artistic triumph, helped by the star power of Hayley Mills and the directorial skill of Bryan Forbes (plus the X factor of newcomer Alan Barnes) – although, like many films from Forbes, it feels as though it needed an extra plot twist."

=== Box office ===
By September 1961, Rank were reporting the film was "exceeding expectations" commercially. The film was the eighth most popular film at the UK box office in 1961. By 1971, it had earned a profit of over £240,000. Forbes later said it was the most popular and profitable film he ever made.

== Awards ==
The film was nominated for four BAFTA (British Academy of Film and Television Arts) awards at the 15th British Academy Film Awards:

- Best British Actress, Hayley Mills
- Best British Film, Bryan Forbes
- Best British Screenplay, Keith Waterhouse and Willis Hall
- Best Film from any Source, Bryan Forbes

== Musical adaptations ==
In 1984, rock group Toto used the plot of the movie for their music video for "Stranger in Town".

In 1989, Russell Labey and Richard Taylor adapted the film into a musical of the same name for the National Youth Music Theatre.

In 1996, Andrew Lloyd Webber and Jim Steinman created another musical adaptation, including the songs "Vaults of Heaven", "Whistle Down the Wind" by Tina Arena, and "No Matter What", which became a hit for Boyzone.
