= Notting Hill (soundtrack) =

Notting Hill: Music from the Motion Picture

Soundtrack album by Various artists
- Released: 17 May 1999 (UK); 24 May 1999 (US)
- Genre: Film soundtrack
- Length: 52:21 (UK); 51:10 (US)
- Label: Island

Notting Hill: Music from the Motion Picture is the soundtrack to the 1999 film of the same name released by Island Records on 17 May 1999 in United States and 24 May in United Kingdom and rest of Europe. The album featured 13 tracks in each versions that are varied from each album; it includes songs performed by Shania Twain, Elvis Costello, Bill Withers, Al Green, 98°, Steve Poltz amongst several others. It also featured incidental underscore composed by Trevor Jones with one of his cues that was in the film, had been split into two songs for the soundtrack, along with excerpts of Jones' score being used throughout the film. The album was made available in CDs and cassettes on its initial release, while a vinyl edition of the album was released on 28 May 2019, 20 years after the film's original release. It received a Brit Award for Best Soundtrack in 2000.

== Reception ==
Stephen Thomas Erlewine of AllMusic wrote "The soundtrack is every bit as consciously classy as the film it supports. If it isn't as ingratiating, that's because it's significantly harder to offer a twist on a formula soundtrack album than on a formula movie. With a film, little details, supporting characters, and subtle, interesting visuals give the movie identity within a formula. Unfortunately, a soundtrack remains a collection of oldies, newer songs, and score excerpts, no matter how much you shake it up, and that's the case here." Filmtracks.com wrote "The sequencing of tracks is different on nearly all of them. There are some downright beautiful solo performances on the expanded promo or bootlegged albums of Jones' score, especially involving the piano writing. But is either of these full-score options worth the search as opposed to commercial song and score combination album? For most listeners, no. The songs are really quite enticing, and since they fit the mood of Jones' underscore very well, they make a nice overall balance. In those eight minutes on the commercial album, the most significant of Jones' orchestral outbursts of theme is presented. Still, though, Jones continues to impress in the entirety of his work, proving his versatility once again."

== Track listing ==
Notting Hill: Music from the Motion Picture – United Kingdom and Europe release
No.	Title	Artist(s)	Length
1.	"From the Heart"	Another Level	4:51
2.	"When You Say Nothing at All"	Ronan Keating	4:14
3.	"She"	Elvis Costello	3:06
4.	"How Can You Mend a Broken Heart"	Al Green	6:24
5.	"In Our Lifetime"	Texas	4:06
6.	"I Do (Cherish You)"	98°	3:45
7.	"Born to Cry"	Pulp	5:33
8.	"Ain't No Sunshine"	Lighthouse Family	3:41
9.	"You've Got a Way" (Notting Hill remix)	Shania Twain	3:21
10.	"Gimme Some Lovin'"	The Spencer Davis Group	2:57
11.	"Will and Anna" (Score)	Trevor Jones	3:35
12.	"Notting Hill" (Score)	Trevor Jones	4:45
13.	"Ain't No Sunshine"	Bill Withers	2:03
Total length:			52:21

Notting Hill: Original Motion Picture Soundtrack – United States release
No.	Title	Artist(s)	Length
1.	"No Matter What"	Boyzone	4:33
2.	"You've Got a Way" (Notting Hill remix)	Shania Twain	3:21
3.	"I Do (Cherish You)"	98°	3:45
4.	"She"	Elvis Costello	3:06
5.	"Ain't No Sunshine"	Bill Withers	2:03
6.	"How Can You Mend a Broken Heart"	Al Green	6:24
7.	"Gimme Some Lovin'"	The Spencer Davis Group	2:57
8.	"When You Say Nothing at All"	Ronan Keating	4:14
9.	"Ain't No Sunshine"	Lighthouse Family	3:41
10.	"From the Heart"	Another Level	4:51
11.	"Everything About You" (Remix)	Steve Poltz	3:55
12.	"Will and Anna" (Score)	Trevor Jones	3:35
13.	"Notting Hill" (Score)	Trevor Jones	4:45
Total length:			51:10

Notting Hill: Original Motion Picture Soundtrack – Australia release
No.	Title	Artist(s)	Length
14.	"Born to Cry" (bonus track)	Pulp	5:33
Total length:			57:54

== Charts ==
=== Weekly charts ===
Chart (1999–2000)	Peak position
Australian Albums (ARIA)	4
Austrian Albums (Ö3 Austria)	2
Belgian Albums (Ultratop Flanders)	2
Belgian Albums (Ultratop Wallonia)	15
Canada Top Albums/CDs (RPM)	17
Dutch Albums (Album Top 100)	1
Finnish Albums (Suomen virallinen lista)	19
French Albums (SNEP)	8
German Albums (Offizielle Top 100)	2
Hungarian Albums (MAHASZ)	11
New Zealand Albums (RMNZ)	8
Norwegian Albums (VG-lista)	1
Spanish Albums (Promusicae)	97
Swedish Albums (Sverigetopplistan)	28
Swiss Albums (Schweizer Hitparade)	3

=== Year-end charts ===
Year-end chart performance for Notting Hill
Chart (2000)	Position
Canadian Albums (Nielsen SoundScan)	158

== Certifications ==
Region	Certification	Certified units/sales
Argentina (CAPIF)	Gold	30,000^{^}
Australia (ARIA)	2× Platinum	140,000^{^}
Belgium (BRMA)	Gold	25,000^{*}
Canada (Music Canada)	2× Platinum	200,000^{^}
Netherlands (NVPI)	Gold	50,000^{^}
New Zealand (RMNZ)	Gold	7,500^{^}
Switzerland (IFPI Switzerland)	Platinum	50,000^{^}
United Kingdom (BPI)	Platinum	300,000^{^}
United States (RIAA)	Platinum	1,330,000
Summaries
Europe (IFPI)	Platinum	1,000,000^{*}
^{*} Sales figures based on certification alone.^{^} Shipments figures based on certification alone.
