= National Youth Music Theatre =

Youth arts organisation in the United Kingdom

- Abbreviation: NYMT
- Formation: 1976; 50 years ago
- Type: Arts and education charity
- Headquarters: London
- Region served: United Kingdom
- Founder: Jeremy James Taylor OBE
- President: Prince Edward, Duke of Edinburgh
- Patrons: Jason Robert Brown, Tom Chambers, Idris Elba, Howard Goodall, Michael Jibson, Toby Jones, Jude Law, Sheridan Smith
- CEO: Adrian Packer CBE
- Website: www.nymt.org.uk
- Formerly called: Children's Music Theatre

The National Youth Music Theatre (NYMT) is an arts organisation in the United Kingdom providing pre-professional education and musical theatre stage experience for young people. Based in London, it is constituted as a private limited company (originally named Children's Music Theatre Limited) and as a registered charity. NYMT was founded in 1976 by director and playwright Jeremy James Taylor. Since its inception, it has produced more than fifty productions at the Edinburgh Festival Fringe, premièred thirty new musical theatre works, toured several times outside the United Kingdom, and had runs in the West End and on Broadway.

Among the many alumni of the National Youth Music Theatre who have gone on to careers in the performing arts are actors Idris Elba and Jude Law, both of whom are also patrons of the organisation, along with Jonny Lee Miller, Sheridan Smith, Connie Fisher, and Matt Lucas. Alumni have also included directors such as Jo Davies, and songwriters such as Tara Mcdonald.

== Activities ==
The NYMT's primary activity is the education of young people in theatre production and performance. It produces and commissions musical theatre works in which young people between the ages of 11 and 23 perform as actors, musicians, and stage crew under the guidance of theatre professionals. The company tours both in the UK and abroad performing established musicals such as Sweeney Todd and Oklahoma!, as well as new works specifically written to be performed by young people. Among the thirty new works that the NYMT has commissioned and/or performed for the first time are Howard Goodall's The Dreaming and The Kissing Dance, and Alan Ayckbourn's Orvin – Champion Of Champions.

The NYMT also runs residential and day workshops in various aspects of theatre production and performance. The company has no core funding and relies upon participants' fees, ticket sales, and fundraising. Young people who participate in the NYMT's productions and workshops do so as amateurs and meet their own expenses and fees, although the company provides bursaries in cases of need.

== History ==
=== 1976 to 2003 ===
The NYMT had its beginnings in 1976, when its founder Jeremy James Taylor, produced The Ballad of Salomon Pavey in a tent on the lawn of Belmont School in Mill Hill, North London. The musical, performed by twenty boys at the school, was based on the life of the 17th-century boy actor, Salomon Pavey, with a book by Taylor and David Drew-Smythe. Taylor then took the production to the Edinburgh Festival Fringe where it won a Scotsman Fringe First award. Appearances at the Edinburgh Fringe in other musicals performed entirely by school children followed in succeeding years with Helen Come Home, or Achilles the Heel (1978) and Tin Pan Ali, or The Sesame Street Racket (1979). The company became known as the Children's Musical Theatre and in 1980 was registered as a private limited company and as a charity. In 1985 it changed its name to the National Youth Music Theatre and began holding residential workshops in addition to its summer productions.

In 1986, The Ragged Child by David Nield, Frank Whately and Taylor, along with Let's Make an Opera, was performed on the Edinburgh International Festival. The Ragged Child went on to Sadler's Wells in Spring 1987 and was filmed for BBC TV a year later. It became one of the company's flagship productions. With its 1998 production of The Ragged Child, the NYMT also became the first touring company to perform at the new Glyndebourne opera house. October's Children by the same team of Nield, Whately and Taylor played on the International Festival in 1990 and in the following year at Sadler's Wells and the Swan Theatre, Stratford. Pendragon by Peter Allwood, Frank Whately, Joanna Horton and Jeremy James Taylor won a Scotsman Fringe First Award in 1994, followed by a tour to the Far East and then a week at the New York City Center where it was given the accolade of New York Times Critics' Choice. By 2003, the company had presented 53 productions at the Edinburgh Fringe, premiered 29 new music theatre commissions, held eight foreign tours, and had runs in the West End and on Broadway.

=== Financial crisis ===
Over the years, the NYMT's main funding had come from private sponsorship, initially from the Nationwide Building Society and then from Andrew Lloyd Webber, as well as grants from the Department for Education and Skills and Arts Council England. When Lloyd Webber's sponsorship ended in 1999, the company's financial position became increasingly precarious. By early 2002, it was operating at a deficit and facing the threat of closure. In October 2003, the National Youth Music Theatre closed its performing company and offices in order to avoid insolvency. Most of its staff were laid off. Later that month Jon Bromwich, who had been the General Manager of NYMT, and other former staff set up a new organisation with similar aims, British Youth Music Theatre (formerly Youth Music Theatre: UK). Meanwhile, NYMT's lengthy negotiations with the Arts Council to obtain a recovery grant proved unsuccessful. However, the NYMT remained active, concentrating largely on its workshop programmes while seeking alternative funding.

=== Relaunch – 2005 to the present ===
In October 2005, with its debts cleared, the company announced a relaunch with a Royal Charity Gala, attended by the NYMT's president, the Earl of Wessex. It also collaborated with the Ambassador Theatre Group to perform excerpts from three Disney musicals for children before an audience of teachers, youth leaders and directors. In 2006, the NYMT returned to full productions with Howard Goodall's The Dreaming at the Tonbridge Arts Festival. In the following years they performed Fiddler on the Roof and Little Me (2007), Whistle Down the Wind and All Above Board (2008), and The Hired Man and Totally Over You (2009). Productions of Sweeney Todd were staged in 2010 and 2011. The company marked its 35th anniversary at London's Vaudeville Theatre in April 2012 with a concert featuring some of NYMT's alumni who have gone on to professional acting careers, including Matt Lucas, Gina Beck, Amy Nuttall, Lara Pulver, Michael Jibson, and Ian Virgo. In August 2012 Jason Robert Brown collaborated with the NYMT to produce the West End première of his musical 13. The NYMT's production, directed by Brown, ran for six performances at the Apollo Theatre. Earlier in the month, Sarah Redmond directed the company's production of Brown's first musical theatre piece, Songs for a New World, at the Bridewell Theatre. The company marked its 40th anniversary at London's Adelphi Theatre in 2016, with a show called Encore: 40th Anniversary Gala including appearances from Lily James, Matt Lucas, Gina Beck, Gavin Spokes, Ben Barnes, Simon Thomas, Jasper Britton, Michael Jibson, and Jason Robert Brown. In 2017, the company produced Imaginary, a musical by Timothy Knapman and Stuart Matthew Price.

Jeremy James Taylor, NYMT's founder, had retired as Artistic Director in 2004 but directed the company's 2006 production of The Dreaming, the first full production after its relaunch, and went on to direct the NYMT's performances of the show for the 2012 International Youth Arts Festival. In the 2010 New Year Honours, he was awarded an OBE "for services to young people and to musical theatre."

Adrian Packer was appointed CEO in 2024.

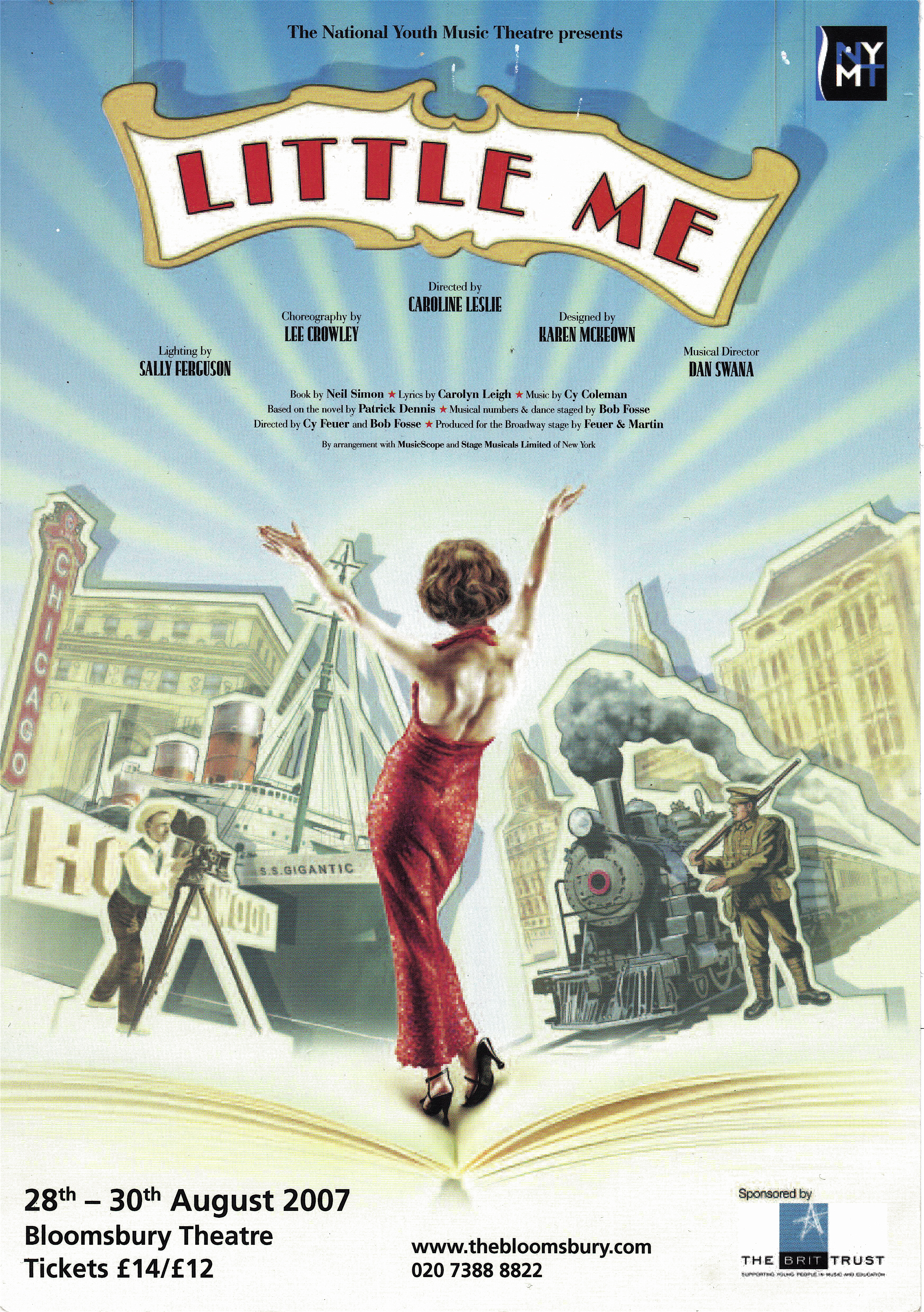
Little Me, 2007

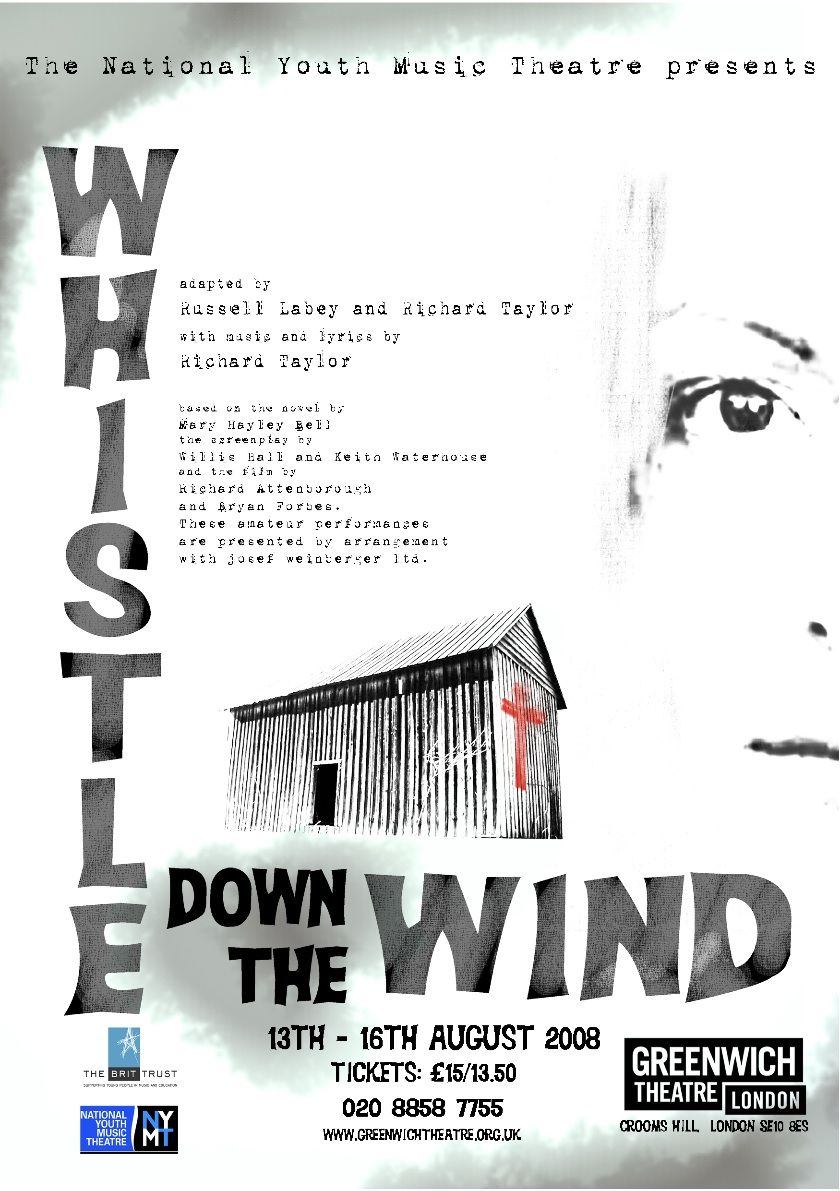
Whistle Down the Wind, 2008

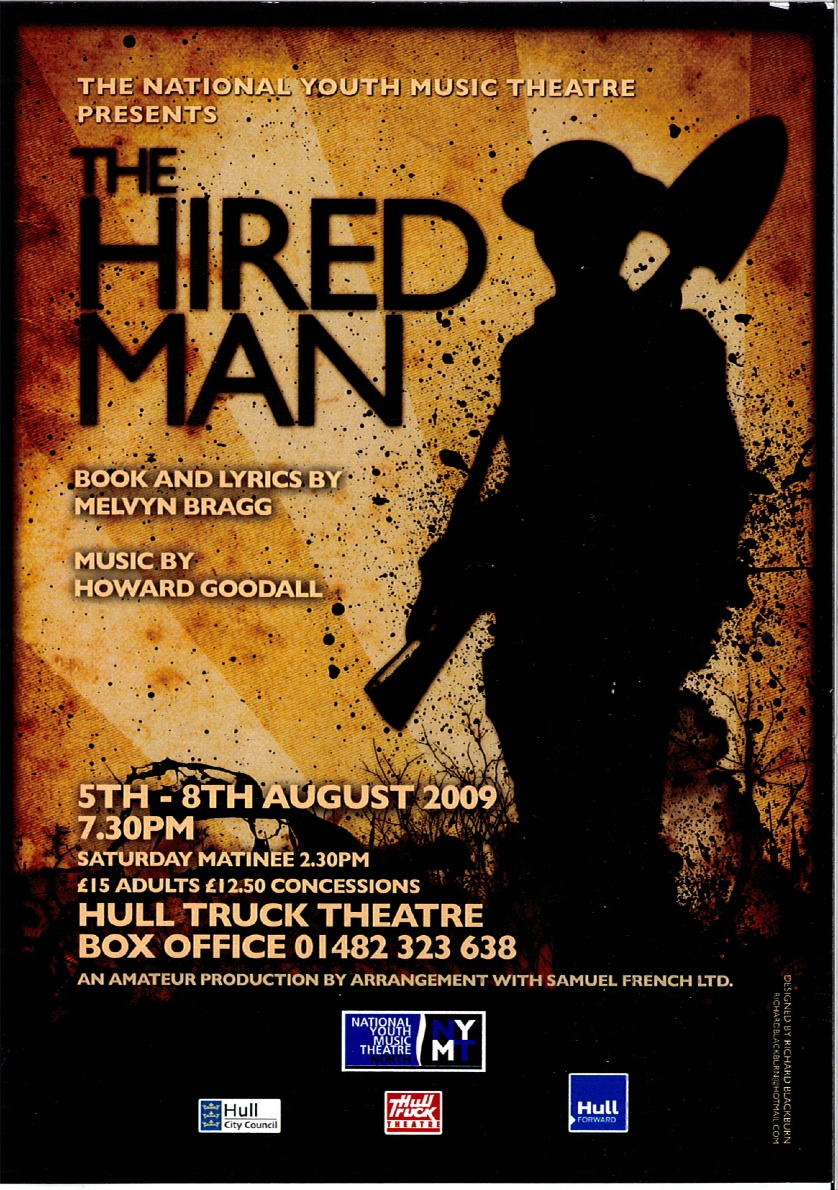
The Hired Man, 2009

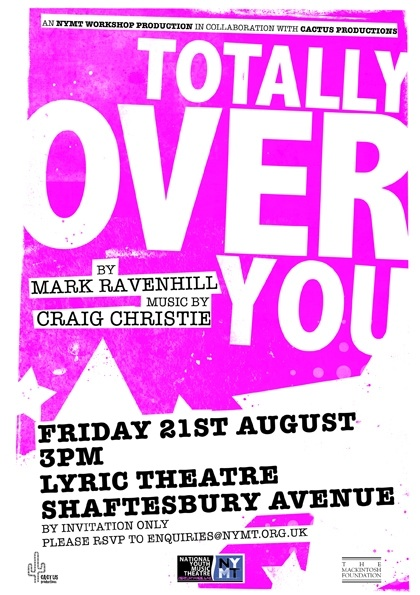
Totally Over You, 2009

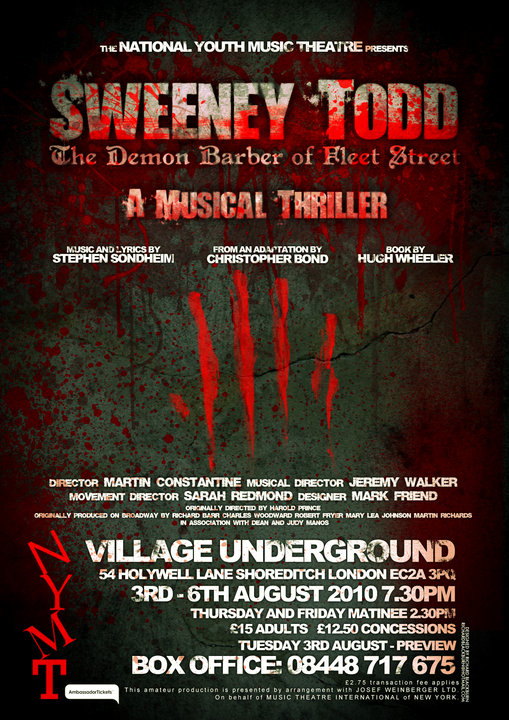
Sweeney Todd, 2010

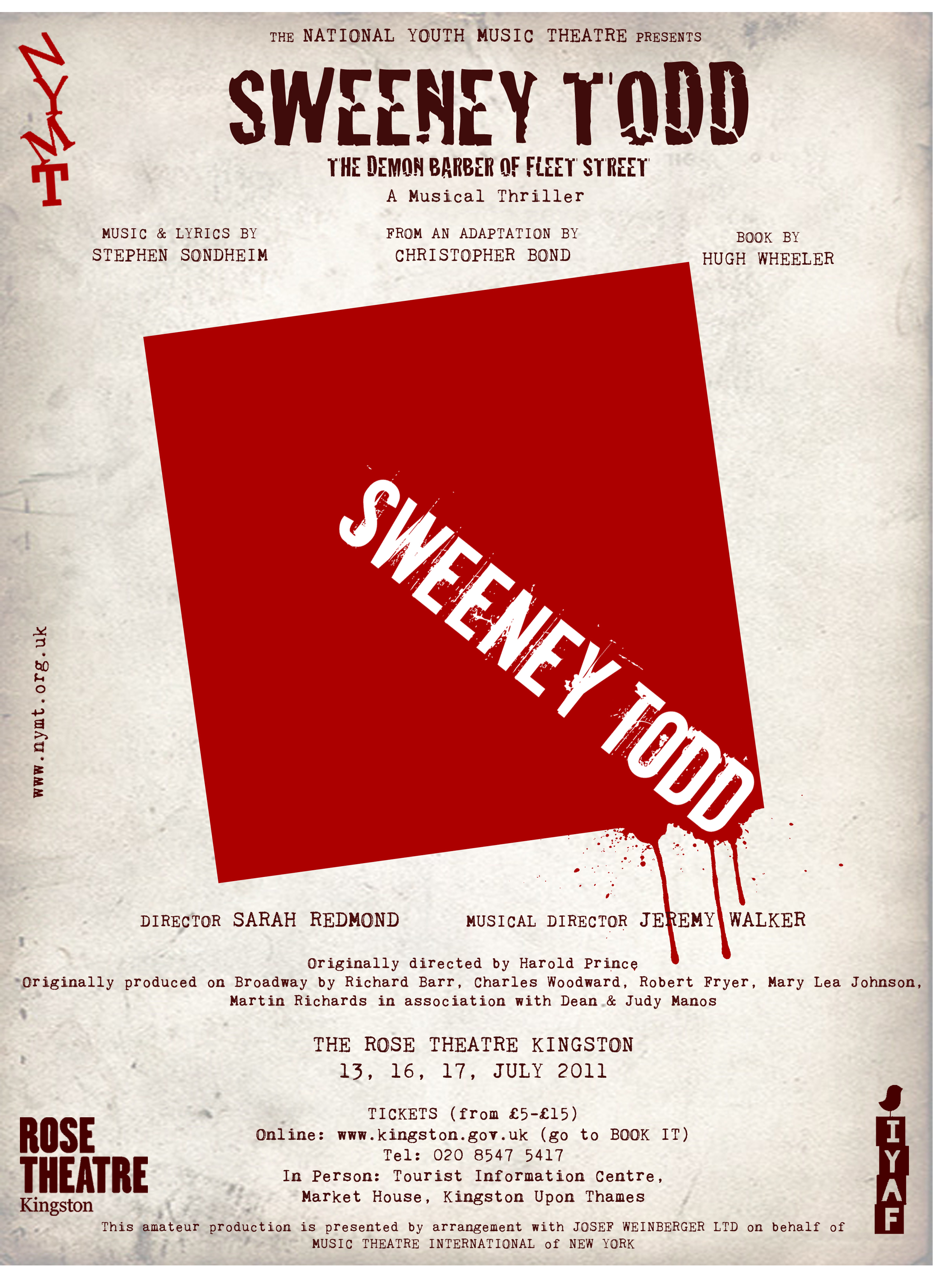
Sweeney Todd, 2011

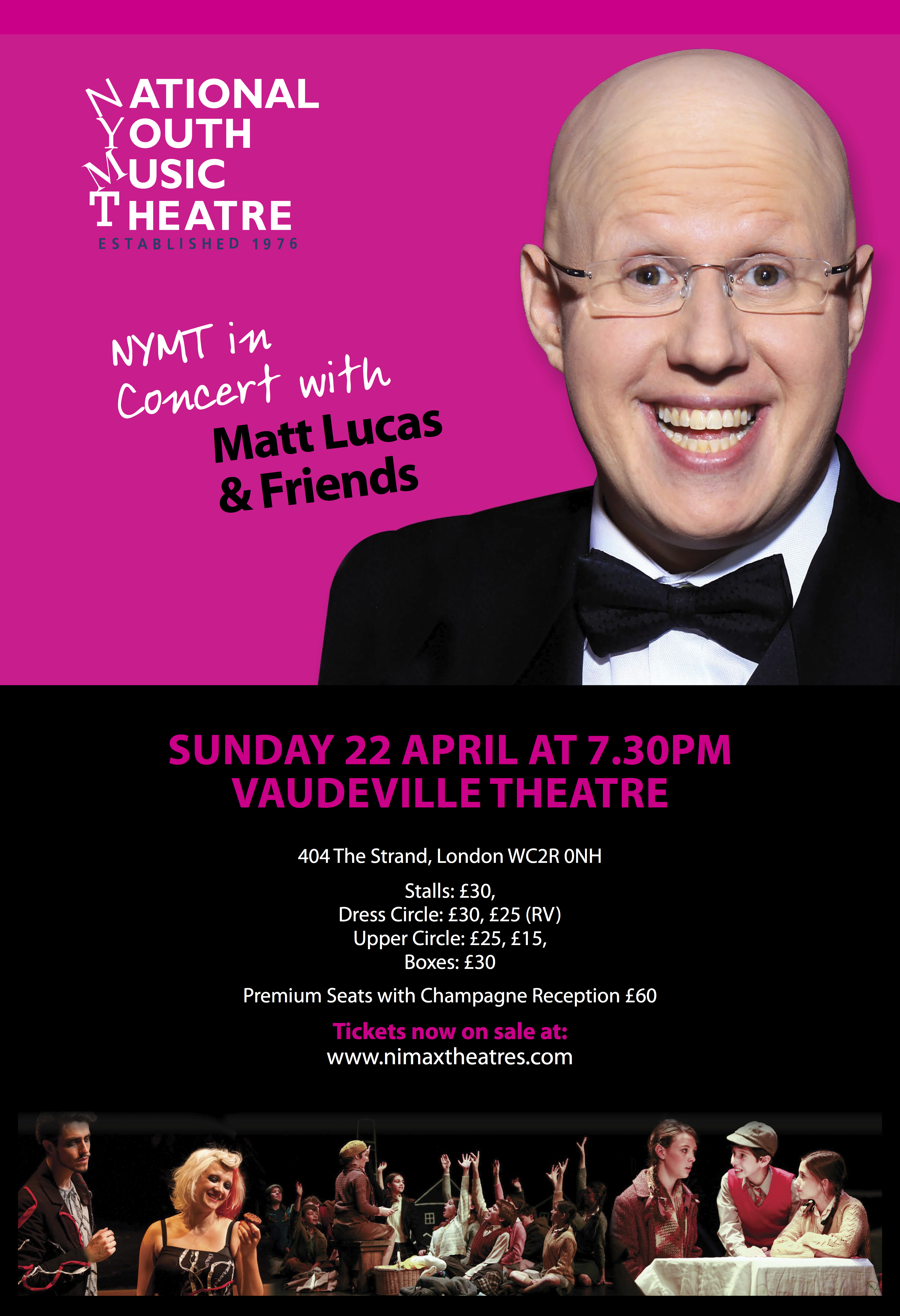
NYMT in Concert with
Matt Lucas, 2012

== Past performances ==
In addition to their live performances, the NYMT has been the subject of three BBC documentaries, Overture and Beginners (Scottish Television, 1982), Kaleidoscope (BBC Radio 4, 1982), and The Making of Bendigo Boswell (BBC Television, 1983). The company's complete performances of Bendigo Boswell and The Ragged Child were also televised by the BBC. The Ragged Child and Pendragon were each the subject of ITV documentaries. Other NYMT productions which were broadcast on television or radio include The Ballad of Salomon Pavey (ATV, 1977), The Roman Invasion of Ramsbottom (Granada Television, 1980), Witches! (Granada Television, 1981), and The Factory Children (BBC Radio 3, 1994).

=== Musical theatre ===
The following shows were all produced by the NYMT with the exception of The Indian Queen (King's Consort production); Born of Glass, Four Walls, Nos Vie En Rose, and Spider Dance (Generator Theatre productions); and The Goblin Market, The Late Sleepers, and Such Sweet Thunder (regional productions).

- 13 The Musical (2012)
- Aesop (1991)
- All Above Board (2008)
- Annie (1986, 1995)
- Aurelius (1997)
- The Ballad of Salomon Pavey (1976, 1977, 1987, 1996, 1999, 2000)
- The Beautiful Game (2018)
- The Beggar's Opera (1996, 1997)
- Bendigo Boswell (1982)
- Billy (1992)
- Billy The Kid (2017)
- Bodywork (1987, 1994)
- Born of Glass (2003)
- BRASS (2014, 2016)
- Brilliant the Dinosaur (1993)
- Bugsy Malone (1996, 1997)
- Captain Stirrick (1980, 1982, 1983, 1984, 1989, 1995)
- "Catastrophe Bay" (2024)
- The Caucasian Chalk Circle (1989, 1990)
- Chess (2022)
- Creation (2000, 2001)
- Drake (1983, 1984, 1988)
- The Dreaming (2001, 2002, 2006, 2012)
- Facade (1981)
- The Factory Children (1994)
- Four Walls (2002)
- Fiddler on the Roof (2007)
- Goblin Market (2003)
- Guys and Dolls (1991, 1992)
- "Battle of Boat" (2016)
- Helen Come Home, or Achilles the Heel (1978, 1984)
- The Hired Man (2009, 2014)
- Honk! (2017)
- The Indian Queen (1995)
- Into the Woods (1999, 2000, 2024)
- Imaginary (2017)
- Jack Spratt VC (1985)
- Joseph and the Amazing Technicolour Dreamcoat (1986, 1989)
- The Kissing Dance (1998, 1999)
- The Late Sleepers (2002)
- The Leaving of Liverpool (1981)
- The Legend of Sleepy Hollow (2018)
- Let's Make an Opera (1986, 1988)
- Lighting The Candle (1994)
- Little Me (2007)
- A Little Princess (2018)
- The Little Rats (1988, 1999)
- Master Peter's Puppet Show (1984, 1989)
- Nos Vie En Rose (2002)
- Not Quite Bedtime (2000)
- Noye's Fludde (1993, 1995)
- October's Children (1990, 1991)
- Oklahoma! (2002, 2003)
- Oliver! (1985, 1991, 1994)
- Once Upon a War (1990, 1991)
- Orvin (2003)
- "Our House" (2024)
- The Other School - by Dougal Irvine (2013)
- Pal Joey (1990)
- Parade (2019)
- Pendragon (1994, 1995, 1996, 2000, 2001,2015)
- Play Extinct (1982)
- Poppy (1993)
- The Powder Monkeys (1984, 1985)
- The Piper of Hamelin (2016)
- The Ragged Child (1986, 1988, 1992, 1993, 1994, 1998, 1999, 2014)
- The Roman Invasion of Ramsbottom (1980, 1987)
- Saint Francis (1993)
- Songs for a New World (2012)
- Spider Dance (2003)
- Spring Awakening (2016)
- Stonehenge Arms Park (1980
- Such Sweet Thunder (2003)
- Sunday in the Park with George (2017)
- Super Hero (2018)
- Sweeney Todd (2010, 2011)
- Sweet Charity (2015)
- The Tailor of Gloucester (1989)
- The Threepenny Opera (1995, 1996)
- Tin Pan Ali, or The Sesame Street Racket (1979, 1982, 1997)
- Totally Over You (2009)
- The Tower of Babel (1983, 1984)
- The Ugly Duckling (2000)
- Warchild (1995, 1996, 1997)
- West Side Story (2013)
- Whistle Down The Wind (1993, 1994, 1996, 2008, 2013)
- Witches! (1981)
- The Wizard of Oz (1998)

=== Concerts and galas ===
In addition to their own concerts and fundraising galas, NYMT has performed musical theatre excerpts on various other occasions, including:

- Lord Shaftesbury Memorial Concert (Royal Festival Hall, 1985)
- Children's Royal Variety Show (Dominion Theatre, 1991)
- Anniversary Gala Concert for Queen Elizabeth (Hampton Court Palace, 1992)
- Music for Youth School Proms (Royal Albert Hall, 1993, 1994, 2002)
- Andrew Lloyd Webber's 50th Birthday Tribute (Royal Albert Hall, 1998)
- Queen Elizabeth's 80th Birthday (Windsor Castle, 2006)
- In Concert with Matt Lucas and Friends (Vaudeville Theatre, 2012)

== Past members ==
Alumni and past members of the National Youth Music Theatre include:

- Martyn Andrews
- Rae Baker
- Ben Barnes
- Joseph Beattie
- Gina Beck
- Jamie Bell
- Charlotte Bellamy
- Declan Bennett
- Antonia Bernath
- Zoe Birkett
- Robin Blaze
- Orlando Bloom
- Douglas Booth
- James Bourne
- Lucy Bradshaw
- Jamie Campbell Bower
- Jamie Bulloch
- Paul Cattermole
- Tom Chambers
- Christian Coulson
- Elliot Cowan
- Misha Crosby
- Peter Darling
- Charles Edwards
- Idris Elba
- Kerry Ellis
- Connie Fisher
- Amy Garcia
- Stephen Graham
- Katie Hall
- Nigel Harman
- Sally Hawkins
- Andrew Hewitt
- Tom Hollander
- Konnie Huq
- Jessie J
- Michael Jibson
- Matthew Jones
- Toby Jones
- Laura Michelle Kelly
- Jude Law
- Rebecca Lock
- Matt Lucas
- Neil McDermott
- Jonny Lee Miller
- Amy Nuttall
- Chiké Okonkwo
- Julian Ovenden
- Jamie Parker
- Mica Penniman
- Sue Perkins
- Helen Power
- Stuart Matthew Price
- Lara Pulver
- Eddie Redmayne
- Charlotte Ritchie
- Sheridan Smith
- Hannah Spearritt
- Nicky Spence
- Flora Spencer-Longhurst
- Clive Standen
- Mary Stockley
- Jim Sturgess
- David Thaxton
- Simon Thomas
- David Watson
- David Witts
- Madeleine Worrall
- Rebecca Newman
