= Hayley Mills =

English actress (born 1946)

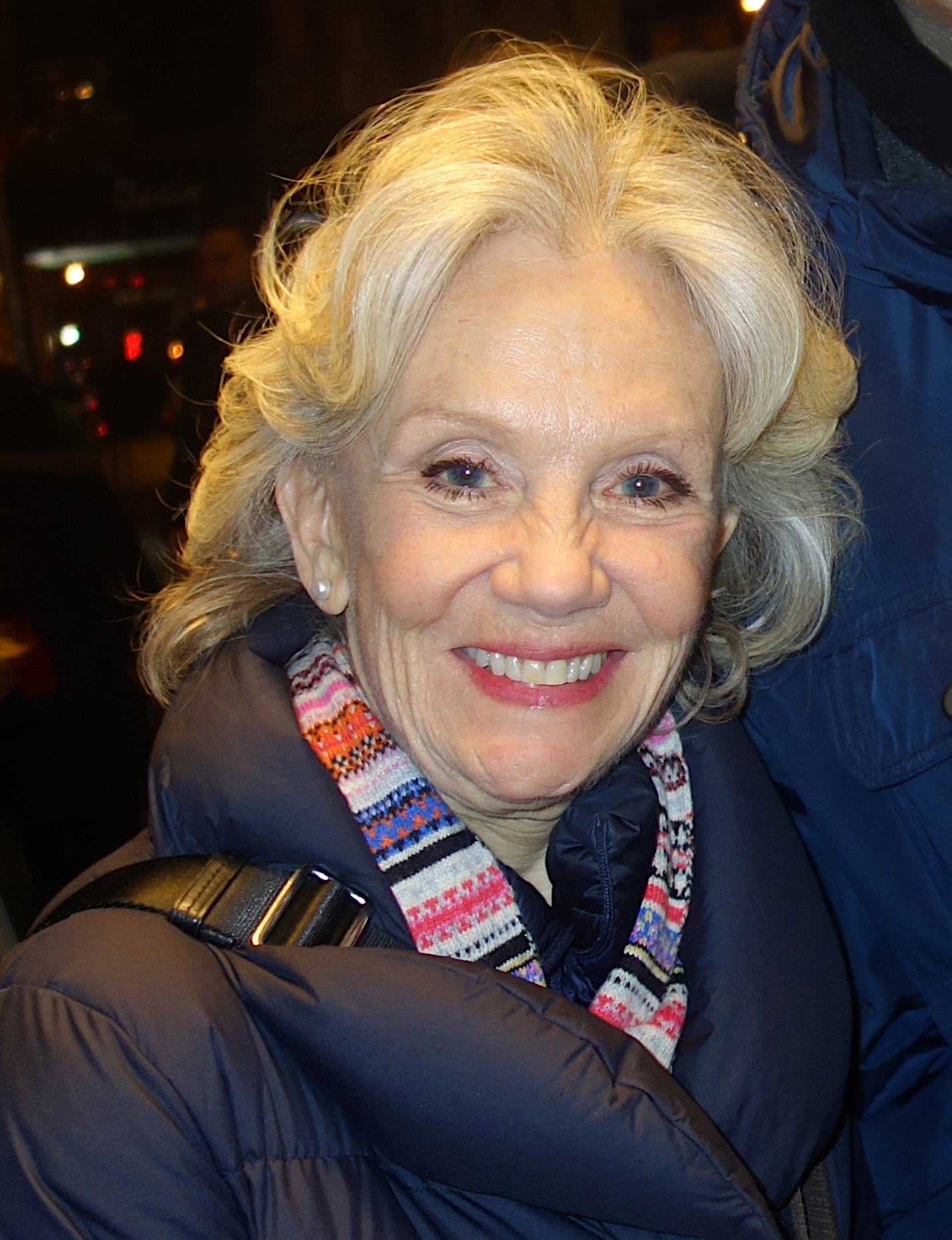
- Mills in 2018
- Born: Hayley Catherine Rose Vivien Mills; 18 April 1946 (age 80); Marylebone, London, England
- Occupations: Actress; singer
- Years active: 1958–present
- Spouse: Roy Boulting (m. 1971; div. 1977)
- Partners: Leigh Lawson (1975–1984); Firdous Bamji (1997–present)
- Children: 2, including Crispian Mills
- Parents: John Mills (father); Mary Hayley Bell (mother)
- Relatives: Juliet Mills (sister); Annette Mills (aunt); Susie Blake (cousin); Mark Weedon (cousin)

Hayley Catherine Rose Vivien Mills (born 18 April 1946) is an English actress. A daughter of John Mills and Mary Hayley Bell and younger sister of actress Juliet Mills, she began her acting career as a child and was hailed as a promising newcomer, winning the BAFTA Award for Most Promising Newcomer for her performance in the British crime drama film Tiger Bay (1959), the Academy Juvenile Award for Disney's Pollyanna (1960) and Golden Globe Award for New Star of the Year – Actress in 1961.

During her early career, Mills appeared in six films for Walt Disney, including her dual role as twins Susan and Sharon in the Disney film The Parent Trap (1961). Her performance in Whistle Down the Wind (a 1961 adaptation of the novel written by her mother) received a nomination for the BAFTA Award for Best British Actress and she was voted the biggest star in Britain for 1961.

In the late 1960s, Mills began performing in theatrical plays, making her stage debut in a 1969 West End revival of Peter Pan. She also played in more mature roles. For her success with Disney, Mills received the Disney Legend Award. She has continued to make films and TV appearances during adulthood, including a starring role in the UK television mini-series The Flame Trees of Thika in 1981, the title role in Disney's television series Good Morning, Miss Bliss in 1988, and as Caroline, a main character in Wild at Heart (2007–2012) on ITV in the UK. She published her memoirs, Forever Young, in 2021.

== Early life and education ==
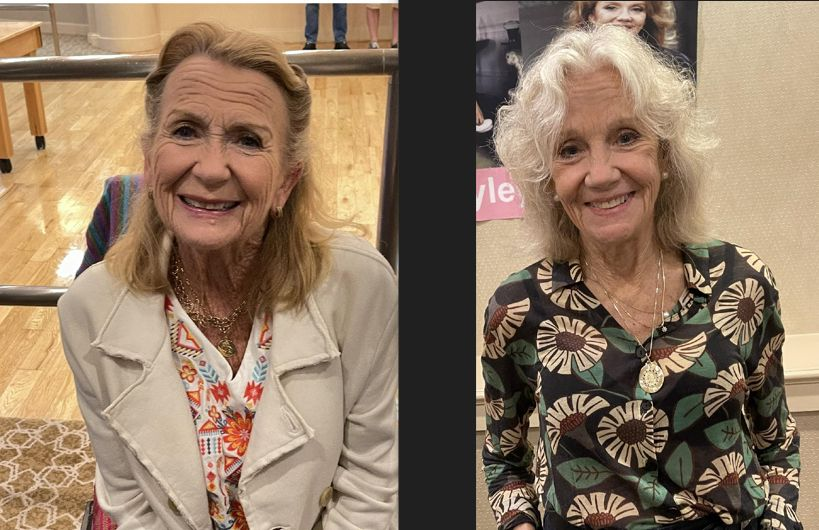
Mills (right) and her sister Juliet in 2025

Hayley Catherine Rose Vivien Mills was born in Marylebone, London, to British actor John Mills and actress Mary Hayley Bell. Her sister is actress Juliet Mills and her brother is writer and producer Jonathan Mills.

== Child actress ==
Mills was 12 when she was cast by J. Lee Thompson, who was initially looking for a boy to play the lead role, in Tiger Bay (1959) which co-starred her father. The movie was popular at the box office in Britain.

=== Disney ===
Bill Anderson, one of Walt Disney's producers, saw Tiger Bay and suggested that Mills be given the lead role in Pollyanna (1960). The role of the orphaned "glad girl" who moves in with her aunt catapulted her to stardom in the United States and earned her a special Academy Award of Juvenile Oscar, the last person to win the accolade. Because she could not be present to receive the trophy, Annette Funicello accepted it on her behalf. Disney subsequently cast Mills as twins Sharon and Susan who reunite their divorced parents in The Parent Trap (1961). In the film, she sings "Let's Get Together" as a duet with herself. The song was a hit around the world, reaching number 8 in the US.

Mills received an offer to make a film in Britain for Bryan Forbes, Whistle Down the Wind (1961), based on a novel by her mother Mary Hayley Bell, about some children who believe an escaped convict is Jesus. It was a hit at the British box office and she was voted the biggest star in Britain for 1961. Mills was offered the title role in Lolita by Stanley Kubrick, but her father turned it down. "I wish I had done it", she said in 1962. "It was a smashing film." Mills returned to Disney for an adventure film, In Search of the Castaways (1962), based on a novel by Jules Verne. It was another popular success, and she was voted the fifth biggest star in the country for the next two years.

In 1963, Disney announced plans to film an adaptation of Dodie Smith's novel I Capture the Castle, with Mills in the role of Cassandra. Disney ended up dropping the project while still retaining film rights to the book when the novelist and the selected screenwriter Sally Benson did not get along; Mills grew too old for the part before the project could be revived. Her fourth movie for Disney did less well than her previous Disney films but was still successful: Summer Magic (1963), a musical adaptation of the novel Mother Carey's Chickens. Ross Hunter hired her for a British-American production The Chalk Garden (1964), playing a girl who torments governess Deborah Kerr. Back at Disney she was in a film about jewel thieves, The Moon-Spinners (1964), getting her first on screen kiss from Peter McEnery. Mills had a change of pace with Sky West and Crooked (1965), set in the world of gypsies, written by her mother and directed by her father, but it was not commercially successful.

In contrast, her last film with Disney, the comedy That Darn Cat! (also 1965), did very well at the box office.

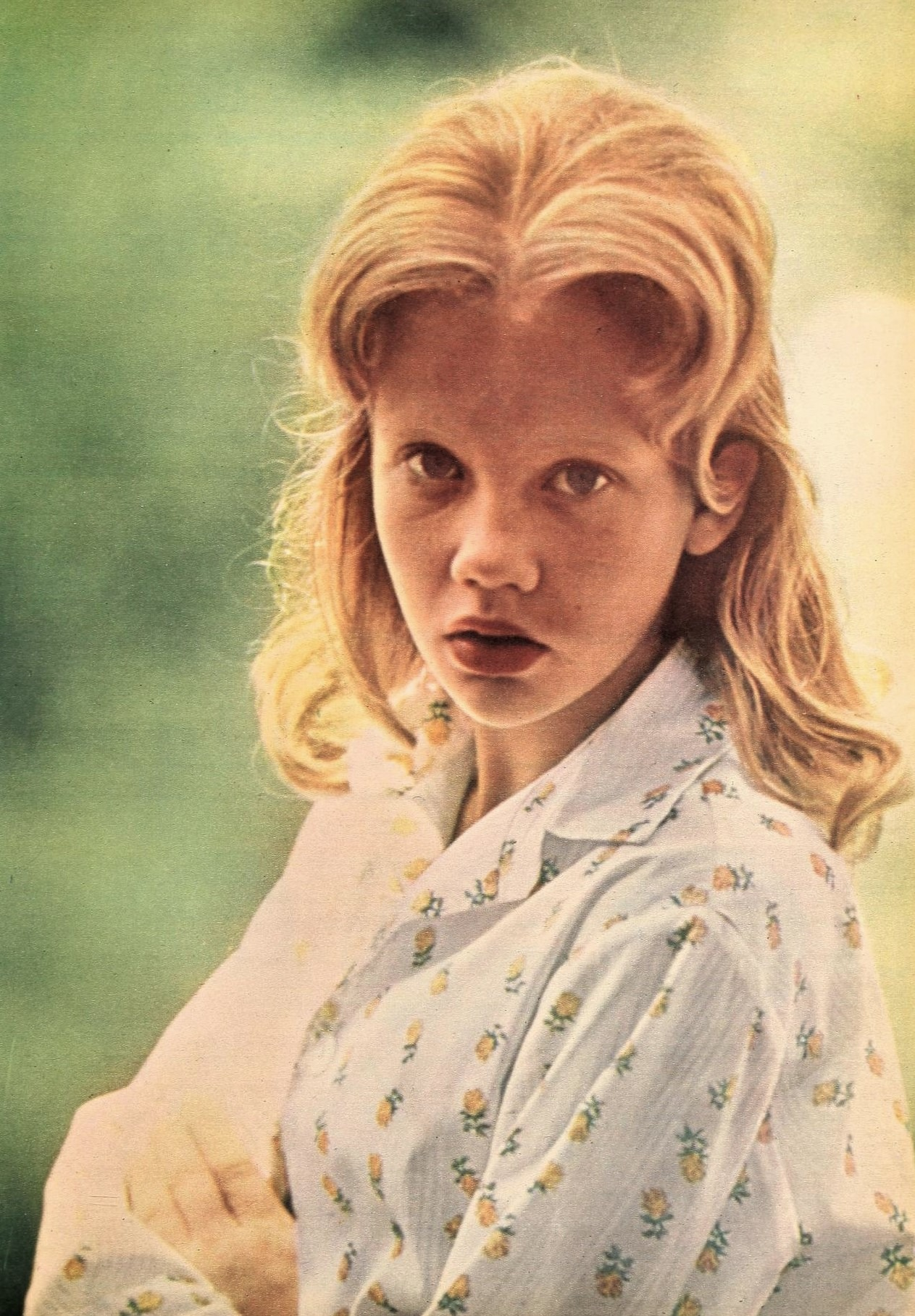
Hayley Mills, 1960

During her six-year run at Disney, Mills was arguably the most popular child actress of the era. Critics noted that America's favourite child star was, in fact, quite British and very ladylike. The success of "Let's Get Together" (which hit No. 8 on the Billboard Hot 100 singles chart, No. 17 in Britain, No. 1 in Mexico, and No. 29 in Canada) also led to the release of a record album on Disney's Buena Vista label, Let's Get Together with Hayley Mills, which also included another hit song, "Johnny Jingo" (Billboard No. 21, 1962; Canada No. 19). In 1962, British exhibitors voted her the most popular film actress in the country. A third single, "Castaway", reached No. 14 in Canada.

In her 2021 autobiography, Forever Young: A Memoir, Mills reflected on the high points of her early career while also discussing her struggles with self-esteem and an eating disorder. She wrote that she had declined roles in Doctor Dolittle and Stanley Kubrick's Lolita because they were inconsistent with the image cultivated during her years with Disney. Although she acknowledged the opportunities afforded by her contract with Walt Disney, she stated that it had restricted her access to a broader range of roles and had, in time, affected her confidence in her own abilities. At age 20, she declined a new Disney contract, believing that the roles assigned to her by the studio had become repetitive. She also wrote that, at 21, she had lost most of her Disney earnings as a result of a 90 percent tax rate imposed by the Inland Revenue in England. Her appeal to recover the funds was unsuccessful, and she recalled that she had feared following the path of Judy Garland by becoming, in her words, a "studio asset".

== Post-Disney film career ==
Following her departure from Disney, Mills continued her film career with a series of diverse roles. For Universal Pictures, she starred alongside her father, John Mills, in The Truth About Spring (1965), which also featured Disney regular James MacArthur. While the film achieved modest success, her next role was in The Trouble with Angels (1966), which proved to be a major box office hit. In the film, directed by Ida Lupino, Mills portrayed a mischievous student at a Catholic boarding school opposite Rosalind Russell.

That same year, she provided the voice of the Little Mermaid in the Rankin/Bass animated feature The Daydreamer (1966). Mills subsequently starred in The Family Way (1966), directed by Roy Boulting. The film, which explored the challenges of a newlywed couple, was noted for its mature themes and featured a musical score by Paul McCartney with arrangements by Beatles producer George Martin. During the production, Mills began a romantic relationship with Boulting; the two married in 1971.

In 1967, Mills appeared in Pretty Polly, a romantic drama set in Singapore, opposite Indian film star Shashi Kapoor. She next starred in the psychological thriller Twisted Nerve (1968), reuniting with The Family Way co-star Hywel Bennett. The controversial film, directed by Boulting, attracted attention for its unsettling themes. She followed this with the romantic comedy Take a Girl Like You (1970), co-starring Oliver Reed, and made her West End stage debut in a 1970 production of The Wild Duck.

Mills continued her collaboration with Boulting in Mr. Forbush and the Penguins (1971), stepping into the lead female role after the original actress was replaced during production. In 1972, she again starred opposite Bennett in Endless Night, a mystery-thriller based on the novel by Agatha Christie, featuring Britt Ekland, George Sanders, and Per Oscarsson. Throughout the mid-1970s, Mills took on roles in several British and international productions, including What Changed Charley Farthing? (1974), Deadly Strangers, and The Kingfisher Caper (both 1975), the latter co-written by Boulting.

Following The Kingfisher Caper, Mills significantly reduced her feature film work but continued to act in occasional roles over the ensuing decades. She appeared as Miss Quinton in the Agatha Christie film adaptation Appointment with Death (1988), and as Sally Ryan in the horror anthology film After Midnight (1990). In 1994, she contributed her voice to the animated feature A Troll in Central Park, portraying the character Hillary.

In the 2000s, Mills took part in independent productions, including 2BPerfectlyHonest (2004), in which she played Terri, and the short film Stricken (2005), where she portrayed Hildy. She later appeared in the family adventure Mandie and the Cherokee Treasure (2010) as Mary Elizabeth Taft, adapted from the Mandie book series, and in the drama Foster (also known as Angel in the House, 2011) as Mrs. Lange.

Mills continued to appear sporadically in film thereafter. In 2021, she played Celia Towers in the time-travel drama Last Train to Christmas, and in 2023, she portrayed Karen Walters in Arthur’s Whisky.

In 2024, Mills appeared in a major American theatrical release in a supporting role as FBI profiler Dr. Josephine Grant in M. Night Shyamalan's psychological thriller Trap. Her casting in the film was highlighted by Shyamalan and in media coverage as a notable and unexpected return for the actress. Trap marked Mills's first major role in a mainstream American film in nearly 60 years, following her performance in The Trouble with Angels (1966).

Mills's post-Disney career was marked by a conscious shift toward more adult and diverse roles. As one critic observed, "She was a movie star for about a decade... a genuine, old-school, above-the-title movie star: listed in box-office polls, the focus of a carefully-protected public image, signatory to a long-term contract with a studio who would try to craft vehicles for her. In fact, you could make an argument that Hayley Mills was one of the last stars for whom that last factor applied, at least in English-speaking cinema".

== Television resurgence and reception ==
In 1981, Mills returned to acting with a starring role in the UK television mini-series The Flame Trees of Thika, based on Elspeth Huxley's memoir of her childhood in East Africa. The series was well received, prompting her to accept more acting roles. She then returned to the United States and made two appearances on The Love Boat in 1985 and an episode of Murder, She Wrote in 1986.

Always welcomed at Disney, Mills narrated an episode of The Wonderful World of Disney, sparking renewed interest in her Disney work. In 1985, she was originally considered to voice Princess Eilonwy in Disney's animated feature film The Black Cauldron but was later replaced by the veteran British voice actress Susan Sheridan. Later, she reprised her roles as twins Sharon and Susan for a trio of Parent Trap television films The Parent Trap II, Parent Trap III, and Parent Trap: Hawaiian Honeymoon. She also starred as the title character in the Disney Channel-produced television series Good Morning, Miss Bliss in 1987. The show was cancelled after 13 episodes and the rights were acquired by NBC, which reformatted Good Morning, Miss Bliss into Saved by the Bell without any further involvement from Mills. In recognition of her work with The Walt Disney Company, she was awarded the Disney Legends award in 1998.

Mills recalled her childhood in the 2000 documentary film Sir John Mills' Moving Memories, which was directed by Marcus Dillistone and produced by her brother Jonathan. In 2005 she appeared in the acclaimed short film Stricken, written and directed by Jayce Bartok. From 2007 to 2012, she appeared as Caroline in the ITV1 African veterinarian drama Wild at Heart; her sister Juliet Mills was a guest star in the drama, which was the first time they had appeared on screen together.

In 2010, Mills appeared in Mandie and the Cherokee Treasure, based on one of the popular Mandie novels of Lois Gladys Leppard. In 2011, she starred in the film Foster with Toni Collette. Mills guest-starred in episodes of Midsomer Murders and Moving On in 2014. In 2019, she had a role in the television series Pitching In set at a holiday park in Wales. In 2021, Mills played Michael Sheen's mother in the film Last Train to Christmas, and in 2022 she had a recurring role in the television thriller series Compulsion.

In February 2023 Mills appeared in the fifth series of the ITV crime drama Unforgotten as Lady Emma Hume. In September 2023, Mills appeared in an episode of The Wheel of Time.

== Stage career ==
Mills made her stage debut in a 1969 West End revival of Peter Pan.

In 1991 she appeared as Anna Leonowens in the Australian production of The King and I. In 1997, Mills starred in the U.S. national tour of Rodgers and Hammerstein's The King and I.

In 2000 she made her Off-Broadway debut in Noël Coward's Suite in Two Keys, opposite American actress Judith Ivey, for which she won a Theatre World Award. In 2001, Mills starred as Desiree Armfeldt in a production of "A Little Night Music" in Seattle, Washington. It was a co-production with the city's A Contemporary Theatre and the Fifth Avenue Theatre.

In December 2007, for their annual birthday celebration of "The Master", The Noël Coward Society invited Mills as the guest celebrity to lay flowers in front of Coward's statue at New York's Gershwin Theatre, thereby commemorating the anniversary of the 108th birthday of Coward.

In 2012 she starred as Ursula Widdington in the stage production of Ladies in Lavender at the Royal & Derngate Theatre, before embarking on a national UK tour. In 2015, she toured Australia with sister Juliet Mills and Juliet's husband Maxwell Caulfield in the comedy Legends! by James Kirkwood.

Mills starred in the 2018 Off-Broadway run of Isobel Mahon's Party Face at City Center.

== Personal life ==
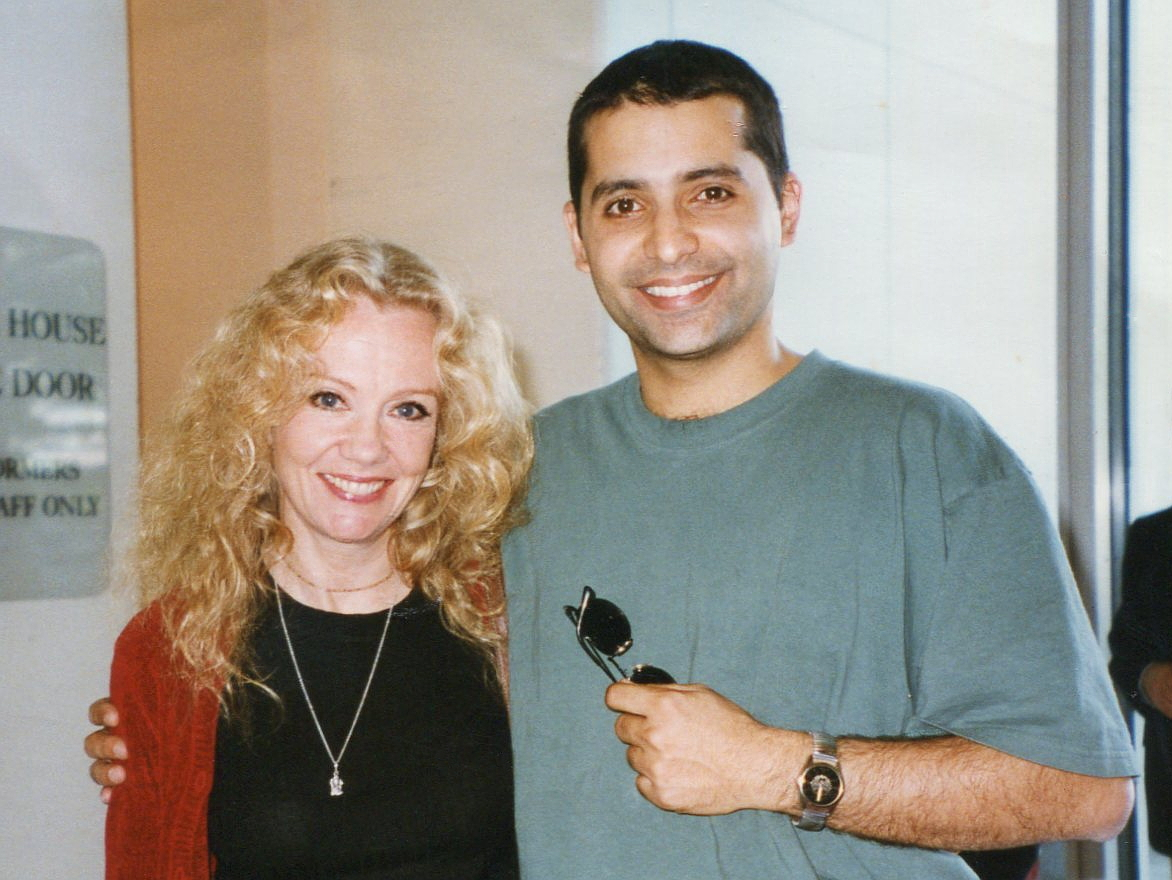
Mills and Firdous Bamji in 1997

In 1966, while filming The Family Way, 20-year-old Mills met 53-year-old director Roy Boulting. The two were married in 1971 and owned a flat in London's Chelsea and Cobstone Windmill in Ibstone, Buckinghamshire, which was later sold. Their son, Crispian Mills, is the lead singer and guitarist for the raga rock band Kula Shaker. The couple divorced in 1977.

Mills had a second son during a relationship in the 1980s with actor Leigh Lawson.

In the 1980s, following her breakup with Lawson, Mills developed an interest in a number of Eastern religions. She wrote the preface to the book The Hare Krishna Book of Vegetarian Cooking, published in 1984, although she was not a member of Hare Krishna. In 1988, Mills co-edited, with Marcus Maclaine, My God: Letters from the Famous on God and the Life Hereafter (Pelham Books, 1988).

Mills's partner since 1997 and as of 2023 is actor/writer Firdous Bamji, who is 20 years her junior. They met when touring playing the lead roles in The King and I.

=== Health ===
In April 2008, Mills was diagnosed with breast cancer. She told Good Housekeeping magazine in January 2012 that she had fully recovered.

== Memoir ==
Mills published a memoir about her life and career, Forever Young: A Memoir, in September 2021.

== Filmography ==
=== Film ===
Year	Title	Role	Notes
1947	So Well Remembered	Infant	Uncredited
1959	Tiger Bay	Gillie Evans	BAFTA Award for Most Promising Newcomer to Leading Film Roles
1960	Pollyanna	Pollyanna Whittier	Academy Juvenile Award note: Mills's miniature Oscar was later lost or stolen; the Academy rectified this by privately presenting Mills with a full-size Oscar replacement in 2023.
1961	The Parent Trap	Susan Evers / Sharon McKendrick	
1961	Whistle Down the Wind	Kathy Bostock	
1962	In Search of the Castaways	Mary Grant	
1963	Summer Magic	Nancy Carey	
1964	The Chalk Garden	Laurel	
1964	The Moon-Spinners	Nikky Ferris	
1965	The Truth About Spring	Spring Tyler	Alternative titles: The Pirates of Spring Cove and Miss Jude
1965	That Darn Cat!	Patricia "Patti" Randall	
1965	Sky West and Crooked	Brydie White	Alternative title: Gypsy Girl
1966	The Trouble with Angels	Mary Clancy	
1966	The Daydreamer	The Little Mermaid	Voice role
1966	The Family Way	Jenny Fitton	
1967	Africa: Texas Style	Blonde Girl at Airport	Cameo
1967	Pretty Polly	Polly Barlow	Alternative title: A Matter of Innocence
1968	Twisted Nerve	Susan Harper	
1970	Take a Girl Like You	Jenny Bunn	
1971	Mr. Forbush and the Penguins	Tara St. John Luke	Alternative title: Cry of the Penguins
1972	Endless Night	Fenella 'Ellie' Thomsen	
1974	What Changed Charley Farthing?	Jenny	Alternative title: The Bananas Boat
1975	Deadly Strangers	Belle Adams	
1975	The Kingfisher Caper	Tracey Van Der Byl	Alternative title: Diamond Hunters and Diamond Lust
1988	Appointment with Death	Miss Quinton	
1990	After Midnight	Sally Ryan	
1994	A Troll in Central Park	Hillary	Voice role
2004	2BPerfectlyHonest	Terri	
2005	Stricken	Hildy	Short film
2010	Mandie and the Cherokee Treasure	Mary Elizabeth Taft	
2011	Foster	Mrs Lange	Alternative title: Angel in the House
2021	Last Train to Christmas	Celia Towers	
2024	Arthur's Whisky	Karen Walters	
2024	Trap	Dr. Josephine Grant	
2025	Fackham Hall	Rose Davenport	Voice role

=== Television ===
Year	Title	Role	Notes
1967	The Prisoner	Magazine Model	Episode: "Hammer into Anvil"
1974	Thriller	Samantha Miller	Episode: "Only a Scream Away"
1979	The Love Boat	Cheryl Tyson	Episode: “A Good and Faithful Servant”
1980	The Love Boat	Leila Stanhope	Episode: “Not So Fast Gopher”
1981	The Flame Trees of Thika	Tilly Grant	Miniseries (7 episodes)
1983	Tales of the Unexpected	Claire Hawksworth	Episode: "A Sad Loss"
1985	The Love Boat	Dianne Tipton	2 episodes
1986	The Parent Trap II	Susan Carey / Sharon Ferris	Television film
1986	Murder, She Wrote	Cynthia Tate	Episode: "Unfinished Business"
1986	Amazing Stories	Joan Simmons	Episode: "The Greibble"
1987–1989	Good Morning, Miss Bliss	Miss Carrie Bliss	14 episodes
1989	Parent Trap III	Susan Evers / Sharon Grand	Television film
1989	Parent Trap: Hawaiian Honeymoon	Susan Wyatt / Sharon Grand	Television film
1990	Back Home	Mrs Peggy Dickinson	Television film
2007–2012	Wild at Heart	Caroline Du Plessis	39 episodes
2014	Midsomer Murders	Lizzy Thornfield	Episode: "Wild Harvest"
2014	Moving On	Madge	Episode: "Madge"
2019	Pitching In	Iona	4 episodes
2022	Compulsion	Connie	2 episodes
2023	Unforgotten	Lady Emma Hume	6 episodes
2023	The Wheel of Time	Gitara Moroso	Episode: "Daes Dae'Mar"
2024	Death in Paradise	Nancy Martin	Episode: "Your Number's Up"

== Theatre ==
Year	Title	Role	Notes
1969	Peter Pan	Peter Pan	
1970	Three Sisters	Irina	
1970	The Wild Duck	Hedvig	
1972	Trelawny of the 'Wells'	Rose Trelawny	
1975	A Touch of Spring	Alison	
1977	Rebecca	Mrs De Winter	
1978	My Fat Friend		
1978	Hush And Hide	Laura Crozier	
1979	The Importance of Being Earnest	Gwendolina	
1980	The Summer Party		
1982	Tally's Folly	Sally	
1983	Dial M for Murder	Margot Wendice	
1983	Secretary Bird	Liz Walford	
1985	Toys in the Attic	Carrie	
1991	The Kidnap Game		
1991	The King and I	Anna	
1992	Fallen Angels	Julia Sterroll	
1994	The Card	Countess of Chell	
1995	Dead Guilty	Margaret	
1996	Brief Encounter	Laura Jesson	
1997–1998	The King and I	Anna	US National Tour
2000	Suite in Two Keys		
2001	A Little Night Music	Desiree	
2001	Sister Mozart		
2001	Vagina Monologues		
2003	Humble Boy	Flora	
2003	Wait Until Dark	Suzy Hendrix	
2005	The Bird Sanctuary		
2005	Two Can Play	Mary	
2012	Ladies in Lavender	Ursula	
2015	Cinderella	Fairy Godmother	Pantomime; at the Richmond Theatre, London
2015	Legends!	Leatrice Monsee	With Juliet Mills
2018	Party Face	Carmel	
2022–2023	The Best Exotic Marigold Hotel	Evelyn Greenslade	

== Awards and nominations ==
Year	Association	Category	Work	Result
1959	Berlin International Film Festival	Silver Bear Extraordinary Prize of the Jury	Tiger Bay	Won
1961	BAFTA Awards	Best British Actress	Pollyanna	Nominated
1961	Laurel Awards	Top Female New Personality		Won
1961	Academy Award	Juvenile Award	Pollyanna	Won
1961	Golden Globe Award	New Star of the Year – Actress		Won
1962	Golden Globe Award	Best Motion Picture Actress – Musical/Comedy	The Parent Trap	Nominated
1962	BAFTA Awards	Best British Actress	Whistle Down the Wind	Nominated
1964	Golden Globe Award	Best Motion Picture Actress – Musical/Comedy	Summer Magic	Nominated

== Let's Get Together with Hayley Mills ==
Let's Get Together with Hayley Mills

Studio album by Hayley Mills
- Released: 1962
- Recorded: 1961
- Genre: Vocal pop
- Length: 20:14
- Label: Vista
- Producer: Camarata

Hayley Mills chronology
Pollyanna (1960)	Let's Get Together with Hayley Mills (1962)	In Search of the Castaways (1962)

Singles from Let's Get Together with Hayley Mills
- 1. "Let's Get Together" Released: August 1961; 2. "Johnny Jingo" Released: February 1962

Let's Get Together with Hayley Mills, released in 1962, was Mills's only solo album. It had the million-selling song "Let's Get Together" and "Johnny Jingo".

Side one

1. "Jeepers Creepers" – 1:37
2. "Green and Yellow Basket" – 1:59
3. "Sentimental Sunday" – 2:04
4. "Ding Ding Ding" – 2:18
5. "Side by Side" – 1:36
6. "Cranberry Bog" – 1:50

Side two

1. "Little Boy" – 2:19
2. "Cobbler Cobbler" – 2:14
3. "Johnny Jingo" – 1:38
4. "Pollyanna Song" – 1:57
5. "Jimmie Bean" – 1:53
6. "Let's Get Together" – 1:29
