= Irene Bradshaw =

British actress (born 1940)

- Born: 15 March 1940 (age 86); Derby, Derbyshire, England
- Occupation: Actress

Irene Bradshaw (born 15 March 1940) is a British actress, and voice and drama coach.

== Life ==
Bradshaw born 15 March 1940 in Derby, Derbyshire, England. She trained at the London Academy of Music and Dramatic Art (LAMDA) in the fifties.

Bradshaw appeared in stage productions such as Shakespeare's The Winter's Tale, Caste by T. W. Robertson, and Bloomsbury by Peter Luke. She participated in a number of films, including The Bargee (1964), Sky West and Crooked (1966) and Dr. Jekyll and Sister Hyde (1971). By the time Bradshaw was 15 she had already made her first television appearance as a dancer in a "Top Town" contest. She appeared in British television series such as United!, The Avengers, Softly, Softly: Task Force and Doctors. Bradshaw's last screen credit was in the television film Tree Fairy (2013).

In addition to acting, she teaches drama and voice having a considerable reputation in this field.

== Selected filmography ==
=== Television ===
Year	Title	Role	Notes
1960	Golden Girl	Maid	Episode: "Sniper"
1961	The Avengers	Maid	Episode: "One for the Mortuary"
1962	Top Secret	Señora Domingo	Episode: "Vengeance at La Vina"
1962	Compact	Val Dartie	Episode: "Barmaid"
1963	The Avengers	Diana DeLeon	Episode: "The Golden Eggs"
1963	Zero One	Young woman with baby	Episode: "Hurricane"
1964	Z-Cars	Girl	Episode: "Cage Until Tame"
1966-67	United!	Iris Murdoch	40 episodes
1967	Rainbow City	Girl in Club	Episode: "Always on Sunday"
1967	The Avengers	Maggie	Episode: "Murdersville"
1968	Z-Cars	Mary Isaacs	Episode: "Take It with a Pinch of Salt: Part 1"
1968	City '68	Jean Prior	Episode: "Freedom of the City"
1968	Harry Worth	The Nurse	Episode: "Match of the Day"
1970	Softly, Softly: Task Force	Jennifer	Episode: "Sweet Are the Uses of Adversity"
1972	Farming	Mary Arch	Episode: "Joseph Arch"
2010	Doctors	Mrs. Hargreaves	Episode: "Plan B"
2010	Whitechapel	Sandra Cobb	Episode 2.1
2013	Bad Education	Hooker	Episode: "Valentine's Day"
