= Whistle Down the Wind (1996 musical) =

1996 musical by Andrew Lloyd Webber

- Music: Andrew Lloyd Webber
- Lyrics: Jim Steinman
- Book: Patricia Knop; Andrew Lloyd Webber; Gale Edwards
- Basis: 1958 novel Whistle Down the Wind; 1961 film Whistle Down the Wind
- Productions: 1996 National Theatre; 1998 West End; 2001 UK Tour; 2006 West End revival 2007 US Tour; 2010 UK Tour

Whistle Down the Wind is a musical with music composed by Andrew Lloyd Webber, who also co-wrote its book with Patricia Knop and Gale Edwards, and lyrics by Jim Steinman. It is based on the 1961 film Whistle Down the Wind, whose source novel was written by Mary Hayley Bell in 1958.

The musical premiered in 1996 at the National Theatre in Washington, D.C., and a concept album was released in 1998. It was produced in the West End in 1998 and has been revived several times since then and toured extensively.

== History ==
=== US premiere ===
The show premiered at the National Theatre in Washington, D.C., on 12 December 1996, starring Davis Gaines as the Man and Irene Molloy as Swallow. It drew mostly negative reviews, and the Broadway opening that had been scheduled for 17 April 1997, was subsequently cancelled.

Lloyd Rose, the Washington Post reviewer wrote that the musical "...is just dull...Steinman and Lloyd Webber's differing styles of gothic intensity might have been expected to be mutually enhancing, but in fact they cancel each other out... Harold Prince brings all his brilliant directing skills to bear on the material, and with Binkley and set designer Andrew Jackness he produces some inventive, often startling staging." The Variety critic praised the Lloyd Webber score, writing it is "a pleasing collection of numbers that range from his trademark melodies to boisterous country barn dances and rocking hymns. ...he has produced some excellent work." He further wrote that "Jim Steinman’s lyrics are consistently on the money." and "Director Prince keeps proceedings moving briskly and excels at easing characters into their numerous numbers."

The Baltimore Sun critic wrote that the musical has ..."lovely Lloyd Webber melodies and a more traditional book-musical structure than the composer's usual sung-through fare.... One change from the source material that appears to reflect director Prince's sensibility is the aura of danger and darkness that suffuses the piece. It's a tonal choice that not only makes the story more credible, but – without giving away the true identity of Gaines' character – it also suits the harsh reality that underlies the children's leap of faith."

=== West End premiere ===
A reworked, and more successful, production opened in the West End at the Aldwych Theatre on 1 July 1998, starring Marcus Lovett as The Man and Lottie Mayor as Swallow. It ran for 1,044 performances and closed in January 2001. This production was darker than the Washington, D.C., production and was revised and directed by Gale Edwards, who had previously collaborated with Lloyd Webber on an updated production of Jesus Christ Superstar.

The original West End cast included:

- The Man – Marcus Lovett
- Swallow – Lottie Mayor
- Amos – Dean Collinson
- Candy – Veronica Hart
- Boone – James Graeme
- Ed – Walter Herron Reynolds III
- Snake Preacher – Christopher Howard
- Earl – Paul Lowe
- Sheriff – John Turner
- Deputy – Craig Parkinson
- The Minister – Reg Eppey
- Brat – Danielle Calvert/Ashley Andrews
- Poor Baby – Ricki Cuttell/Dean Clish

The role of The Man was later played by Jérôme Pradon and Glenn Carter, and Swallow was played by Laura Michelle Kelly. The children's cast included Jessica Cornish (now known as Jessie J), Anne-Marie, Hannah Tointon, James Buckley, Hannah Cooper, Matthew Thomas, Jade Ewen, Jay Asforis, Sam Gillam and Cassie Compton.

=== Subsequent productions ===
In 2001, Bill Kenwright produced and directed his own production of Whistle Down the Wind for a UK tour, starring Tim Rogers as The Man and Katie Rowley Jones as Swallow. He was granted a considerable amount of creative freedom as director, authorised by Andrew Lloyd Webber to make significant changes to the dramatic structure of the musical, including replacing the running parable of Annie and Charlie Christmas told to the children by The Man with a lighter-toned number called "The Gang" (lyrics by Don Black). This version was simpler in design and more focused on the human story than the spectacular visuals of the Aldwych production. The show toured the UK a number of times between 2001 and 2004.

At the request of Lloyd Webber, Kenwright brought this production to the Palace Theatre, London in March 2006, where it played a limited run until August, filling the gap between the closure of another Lloyd Webber musical, The Woman in White and the opening of the Monty Python musical Spamalot. Tim Rogers reprised his acclaimed performance of The Man, and Claire Marlowe, another veteran of the UK tour, reprised the role of Swallow. The critical opinion was mixed, ranging from Michael Billington's 2 star review in The Guardian to Benedict Nightingale's 4 star review in The Times, but virtually all of the national papers agreed that this version was an improvement on Gale Edwards's Aldwych production.

A US tour began in Houston in September 2007, and ended in February 2008 in Norfolk, Virginia. The production was again directed and produced by Bill Kenwright, who had expressed his intention to take the show to Broadway. It starred Eric Kunze as The Man and Andrea Ross as Swallow. In each city, local children were added to the cast. Planned Los Angeles and San Francisco dates were cancelled.

Kenwright presented a second UK tour in 2010, opening at the Liverpool Empire on 20 January and moving onto venues including Bristol and Edinburgh. Jonathan Ansell played The Man, and Carly Bawden was Swallow.

2022 saw a small revival of the show, at the Watermill Theatre in Newbury, England. It was directed by Tom Jackson Greaves, and featured a cast of 12 actor-musicians, starring Lydia White as Swallow, and Robert Tripolino as The Man. The show had a strictly limited run, from July 2022 through to Sept 2022. It was reviewed favourably by The Guardian, receiving 5 stars out of 5. It was also nominated for "Best Musical Production" in the 2022 UK Theatre Awards.

A new production was workshopped and presented in a developmental concert at the Bardavon 1869 Opera House in Poughkeepsie, New York, as part of New York Stage and Film's Summer Season in 2026. A co-production with Deaf West Theatre, it was directed by Bill Rauch and featured a cast of both hearing and deaf actors. Similar to prior productions by Deaf West including Spring Awakening and Big River, the production aims to incorporate American Sign Language into the storytelling of the musical.

== Synopsis ==
Act 1

In a small church in Louisiana the congregation is about to sing a song, "Vaults of Heaven". After the song, the preacher concludes his sermon, and the congregation go their separate ways (Overture). Poor Baby complains that "I Never Get What I Pray For", before Poor Baby, Swallow and Brat meet Ed, who is about to drown some kittens. Swallow manages to save them and the kids realise that they should have been "Home By Now." Earl is looking for a place to put up a tent for a revival meeting, where "folks go to dance with snakes" in order to test their faith in Jesus. Back at their home, their father Boone tries to convince them that "It Just Doesn't Get Any Better Than This," before recalling what his wife used to say: "Whistle Down The Wind." As Poor Baby puts it, 'Ma sang it better,' and Swallow leaves to go feed the kittens, while singing "Whistle Down The Wind" to herself. In the barn, she prays that God will look after the kittens, but is startled by a loud cry, and a man jumps out at her. When she asks who he is, he only manages to moan "Jesus Christ.." before he collapses. She, Brat and Poor Baby promise they won't tell anyone that he is there: "The Vow."

In a bar where Ed is singing "Cold" to entertain the townspeople. The Sheriff arrives at the bar to warn the town that there is an escaped killer on the loose, and that he could be hiding out nearby. In the barn, The Man (Arthur Blakey in the source novel, unnamed in the play) wakes to find himself surrounded by children, who all promise to take care of him and to keep his existence a secret. Left alone, he sings of "Unsettled Scores." Later that night, Swallow brings him some food, and asks him if he will bring her mother back: "Being the Son of God, it can't be that difficult for you!" She sings "If Only," thinking of the way she wishes things could be.

Candy, a young black girl, and Amos, a white boy, sing of longing to get away from the town they live in, to a place they can be free: "Tire Tracks and Broken Hearts." The townspeople sing of how the town used to be, and what it must be again: "Safe Haven."

The children are discussing what it would mean if the mysterious man really was Jesus Christ, and what a difference it would make to their lives: "Long Overdue for a Miracle." They realise that if they do everything right, they could save him, and that this could be the night "When Children Rule The World." In the barn, they beg The Man to tell them a story, and he complies, telling them a story which he says will be in the next Testament, "Annie Christmas". When he finishes, they ask repeatedly what the moral is, and when he admits that he doesn't know, they offer him gifts and promise that "No Matter What," they'll always love him. The adults prepare to hunt down the escaped killer, their anger in complete contrast to the children's innocence and happiness.

Act 2

The townspeople are again preparing to hunt down the killer (Safe Haven Reprise). The Man asks Swallow to retrieve a package for him, 4 miles away at the train tunnel, and on noticing that she is shaking, tells her to "Try Not To Be Afraid." Amos arrives at the barn to visit Swallow before he leaves town with Candy, and asks if she will tell him her big secret before he goes. He says if they share secrets, they'll have to seal them with a kiss, and that "A Kiss Is A Terrible Thing To Waste." The Man, hiding in the barn, overhears their conversations and joins in as Amos sings the song, realising that they seem to correspond to his life- "The emptiest words that there'll ever be, it could have been me- it could have been me." Swallow asks Amos to take her to the train tunnel before he can kiss her. There, she retrieves the package, but is almost killed by a train, though Amos manages to push her out of the way in time. "You saved my life, Amos! That means I owe you one now!" she says, then she tells him her secret: "What would you say if I told you Jesus had come back? He's back, Amos! Jesus is in my barn!" They are interrupted by the Sheriff, who thinks he has discovered the killer, and is rather disappointed to find it is only Swallow and Amos. Earl has been hiding in the train tunnel the whole time and has overheard Swallow's secret. At home, Swallow finds Poor Baby, who is upset because his kitten, which he asked "Jesus" to look after, has died; Swallow suggests they ask "Jesus" why he allowed the kitten to die: "If Only (Reprise)." In the barn, The Man tells them another story to explain why the kitten died: "Charlie Christmas," saying that everyone dies in the end, "even the cat, even old Charlie...even your mother."

On the highway, Candy waits for Amos: "Off Ramp Exit To Paradise," but when he eventually turns up, its only to ask her where Swallow is, as he says she's in trouble. When he runs off, Candy meets Earl, who says he knows Swallow's big secret, and knows why Amos is rushing off in such a hurry. When he tells Candy, she decides to get back at Amos and Swallow by telling the whole town Swallow's secret, interrupting the revival meeting: "Wrestle with the Devil." The townspeople decide that the killer has to be found once and for all, in order to save the children: "The Hunt."

Swallow runs back to the barn to warn The Man that the whole town is heading for the barn to catch him- when he says he will have to try and run for it, she begs him to stay, promising that she will protect him. He tries to make her realize that he is not the person she thinks he is: "Nature of the Beast." But she says that she realizes that now, and simply needs him to be whoever he is. When the townspeople get to the barn, they find it surrounded by the kids who are determined not to let them hurt The Man. Swallow is trapped in the barn with him, and he says he will take her hostage, but quickly changes his mind and instead pushes her out of the barn to safety. Left alone, he sets fire to the barn, so that when Swallow manages to get back in, there's no trace of him left. Swallow is convinced he hasn't left for good, saying, "He'll be back...I just know he will." Her father tries to make her see that he wasn't Jesus. She still isn't completely convinced, asking, "But how do you know?" The family, together again, sing "Whistle Down The Wind."

== Original London Cast Recording ==
Act I

- The Vaults of Heaven
- Overture
- I Never Get What I Pray For
- Home by Now
- It Just Doesn't Get Any Better than This
- Whistle Down the Wind
- The Vow
- Cold
- Unsettled Scores
- If Only
- Tire Tracks and Broken Hearts
- Safe Haven
- Long Overdue for a Miracle
- When Children Rule the World
- Annie Christmas
- Finale Act 1: No Matter What / When Children Rule the World (Reprise)

Act II

- Introduction Act Two
- Try Not to Be Afraid
- A Kiss Is a Terrible Thing to Waste
- If Only (Reprise)
- Charlie Christmas
- Off Ramp Exit to Paradise
- Safe Haven (Reprise)
- Wrestle with the Devil
- The Hunt / Wrestle with the Devil (Reprise) / When Children Rule the World (Reprise)
- Nature of the Beast / When Children Rule the World (Reprise)
- Whistle Down the Wind (Reprise)

== Recordings ==
=== Concept album ===
Songs from Whistle Down the Wind

Studio album by Various artists
- Released: 1998
- Studios: FLM, Westlake (Hollywood, California); Flyte Tyme Productions (Edina, Minnesota); Madjef Productions (Minneapolis, Minnesota); Barking Dog, Bovaland, The Hit Factory, Power Station (New York); Abbey Road, CTS, Metropolis, Sarm West, Skratch, Whitfield Street (London, England)
- Genre: Concept album
- Length: 52:58
- Labels: Polydor; Really Useful
- Producers: Andrew Lloyd Webber; Jim Steinman; Nigel Wright; Gary Hines; Simon Franglen; Angela Lupino; Steven Rinkoff; Tot Taylor

Singles from Songs from Whistle Down the Wind
- 1. "Whistle Down the Wind" Released: 8 June 1998; 2. "No Matter What" Released: 3 August 1998; 3. "A Kiss is a Terrible Thing to Waste" Released: 1998

A concept album, Songs from Whistle Down the Wind, was released in 1998 in advance of the show's West End premiere. It features 12 of the songs from the show performed by various popular recording artists and West End theatre stars who have collaborated with Lloyd Webber and Steinman over the years. Lottie Mayor, who had been cast as Swallow in the West End production, appears on the album accompanied by Lloyd Webber. Steinman and Lloyd Webber were executive producers.

==== Track listing ====
All lyrics are written by Jim Steinman; all music is composed by Andrew Lloyd Webber.

No.	Title	Producer(s)	Length
1.	"Vaults of Heaven" (Tom Jones with Sounds of Blackness)	Andrew Lloyd Webber, Nigel Wright, Gary Hines	3:44
2.	"Whistle Down the Wind" (Tina Arena)	Simon Franglen, Angela Lupino	3:53
3.	"No Matter What" (Boyzone)	Jim Steinman, Lloyd Webber, Wright, Franglen, Lupino	4:40
4.	"If Only" (Elaine Paige)	Wright	3:19
5.	"When Children Rule the World" (Donny Osmond)	Wright	3:15
6.	"Cold" (Everly Brothers)	Lloyd Webber, Wright	3:33
7.	"A Kiss Is a Terrible Thing to Waste" (Meat Loaf)	Steinman, Lloyd Webber, Steve Rinkoff, Wright	7:35
8.	"Try Not To Be Afraid" (Boy George)	Steinman, Wright, Rinkoff, Tot Taylor	3:36
9.	"Wrestle with the Devil" (Sounds of Blackness)	Wright, Hines	4:24
10.	"Tire Tracks and Broken Hearts" (Bonnie Tyler)	Steinman, Rinkoff	5:20
11.	"Unsettled Scores" (Michael Ball)	Wright	5:56
12.	"Whistle Down the Wind" (Lottie Mayor with Andrew Lloyd Webber)	Wright, Lloyd Webber	3:43

"No Matter What" was released as a single to notable success: it went platinum, was voted the UK's Record of the Year for 1998, and hit No. 1 in the United Kingdom. It was included in the film Notting Hill and would later be covered by Meat Loaf as a medley with another piece from the musical, "Home by Now" in his compilation album The Very Best of Meat Loaf.

Tina Arena's recording of the title song peaked at No. 24 on the UK Singles Chart on 27 June.

"When Children Rule the World" was previously recorded in 1996 by the Red Hill Children for Children in Need. It was released as a single in the United Kingdom, peaking at number 40. A medley of "Whistle Down the Wind" and "When Children Rule the World" was performed by Ryoko Moriyama during the opening ceremony of the 1998 Winter Olympics in Nagano, Japan, with new Japanese lyrics by Keita Asari.

==== Personnel ====
Adapted from liner notes:

- Andrew Lloyd Webber – executive producer, composer
- Jim Steinman – executive producer, lyricist

"Vaults of Heaven"

- Andrew Lloyd Webber – producer, arrangement
- Nigel Wright – producer, arrangement, piano
- Gary Hines – additional production, vocal arrangement, keyboards
- Chris Blair – mastering
- Frank Filipetti – mixing
- Jim Steinman – mixing
- Jeff Taylor – recording, drum programming
- Sounds of Blackness – vocals, instruments, horns
- Carrie Harrington – lead vocals
- Yulanda Rambo – lead vocals
- Daryl Boudreaux – percussion
- Perry Trenon Graham – percussion, drums
- Billy Steele – keyboards
- Larry Sims – trumpet
- Juan Navarro – trombone
- Franklin Wharton – alto saxophone
- David Wright III – baritone saxophone
- Louis Wilson – tenor saxophone
- Robin Sellars – engineer
- Lee McCutcheon – keyboard programming
- Friðrik Karlsson – guitar
- Paul Keogh – guitar
- Steve Pearce – bass guitar
- Ralph Salmins – drums
- Pete Adams – piano
- Keith Fairbain – percussion

"Whistle Down the Wind"

- Simon Franglen – producer, arrangement, engineer, keyboard programming
- Angela Lupino – producer, arrangement, bass
- Stephanie Gilden – assistant engineer
- Tom – assistant engineer
- Chris Blair – mastering
- Michael Thompson – electric guitar, acoustic guitar

"No Matter What"

- Jim Steinman – producer
- Andrew Lloyd Webber – producer
- Nigel Wright – producer, keyboards
- Simon Franglen – additional production, arrangement, engineer, keyboards, programming
- Angela Lupino – additional production, arrangement, bass
- Steve Rinkoff – mixing, engineer
- Mick Guzauski – mixing
- Robin Sellars – engineer
- Alex Black – assistant
- Lee McCutcheon – keyboard programming
- Friðrik Karlsson – guitar
- Tracy Ackerman – backing vocals
- Andy Caine – backing vocals
- Tom – assistant engineer
- Michael Thompson – electric guitar, acoustic guitar
- Chris Blair – mastering

"If Only"

- Nigel Wright – producer
- Dick Lewzy – engineer
- Robin Sellars – engineer, mix engineer
- Chris Blair – mastering
- David Cullen – orchestration
- Chris Nightingale – orchestra conductor

"When Children Rule the World"

- Nigel Wright – producer
- Robin Sellars – engineer
- Lee McCutcheon – keyboard programming
- Chris Blair – mastering
- Mick Mullins – backing vocals
- David Arch – brass arrangement

"Cold"

- Andrew Lloyd Webber – producer
- Nigel Wright – producer
- Robin Sellars – engineer
- Lee McCutcheon – keyboard programming
- Chris Blair – mastering
- Friðrik Karlsson – guitar
- Steve Pearce – bass guitar
- Ralph Salmins – drums
- Pete Adams – piano
- Gerry Hogan – pedal steel guitar
- Keith Fairbain – percussion
- Mark Feltham – harmonica
- Jamie Talbot – baritone saxophone
- Anne Skates – backing vocals
- Mary Carewe – backing vocals
- Mick Mullins – backing vocals
- Robert Fardell – backing vocals
- Pam Sheyne – backing vocals

"A Kiss is a Terrible Thing to Waste"

- Jim Steinman – producer, arrangement
- Andrew Lloyd Webber – arrangement, co-producer, orchestra arrangement
- Roy Bittan – arrangement, acoustic piano
- Steve Rinkoff – co-producer, engineer
- Nigel Wright – co-producer
- Marc Lane – assistant
- Alex Black – assistant
- Frank Filipetti – mixing
- Robin Sellars – additional engineering
- Lee McCutcheon – keyboard programming
- Chris Blair – mastering
- Bonnie Tyler – guest vocals
- Cathy Porter – "If Only's"
- Kasim Sulton – backing vocals
- Glen Burtnick – backing vocals
- Keith Murrell – backing vocals
- Kenny Aronoff – drums
- Eddie Martinez – guitars
- Clem Clemson – solo guitar
- David Cullen – orchestra arrangement
- Mike Reed – orchestra conductor

"Try Not To Be Afraid"

- Jim Steinman – producer, mixer
- Nigel Wright – original backing track co-producer
- Steve Rinkoff – original backing track co-producer, engineer, mixer
- Tot Taylor – additional arrangement, additional production, acoustic guitar, piano, organ, synthesizer, samples, percussion
- Robin Sellars – engineer
- Tony Harris – engineer
- Lee McCutcheon – programming
- Chris Blair – mastering
- Jackie Raw – backing vocals
- Anita Kelsey – backing vocals
- Sylvia Mason-James – backing vocals
- Friðrik Karlsson – guitar
- Steve Pearce – bass guitar
- Ralph Salmins – drums
- Pete Adams – piano
- Frank Ricotti – additional percussion, crotales, tubular bells

"Wrestle With the Devil"

- Nigel Wright – producer, arrangement, piano
- Gary Hines – producer, arrangement, vocal arrangement, keyboards
- Jeff Taylor – recording, mixing, drum programming
- Chris Blair – mastering
- Sounds of Blackness – vocals, instruments, horns
- Core Cotton – lead vocals
- Carrie Harrington – lead vocals
- Quan Howell – lead vocals
- Daryl Boudreaux – percussion
- Billy Steele – keyboards
- Larry Sims – trumpet
- Juan Navarro – trombone
- Franklin Wharton – alto saxophone
- David Wright III – baritone saxophone
- Louis Wilson – tenor saxophone

"Tire Tracks and Broken Hearts"

- Jim Steinman – producer, arrangement
- Steve Rinkoff – co-producer, engineer
- Jeff Bova – arrangement, keyboard programming
- Greg Pinto – assistant engineer
- Peter Karam – assistant engineer
- Frank Filipetti – mixing
- Sammy Merendino – drum programming
- Eddie Martinez – guitars
- Bonnie Tyler – performer
- Eric Troyer – backing vocals
- Curtis King – backing vocals
- Kasim Sulton – backing vocals
- Sisaundra Lewis – backing vocals
- Elaine Caswell – backing vocals
- Cindy Mizelle – backing vocals
- Paulette McWilliams – backing vocals
- Brenda White-King – backing vocals

"Unsettled Scores"

- Nigel Wright – producer
- Dick Lewzy – engineer
- Robin Sellars – engineer, mix engineer
- Lee McCutcheon – programming
- David Cullen – orchestration
- Chris Nightingale – orchestra conductor
- Chris Blair – mastering

"Whistle Down the Wind"

- Nigel Wright – producer
- Andrew Lloyd Webber – producer, orchestration, piano
- Dick Lewzy – engineer
- Robin Sellars – engineer, mix engineer
- David Cullen – orchestration
- Chris Nightingale – orchestra conductor
- Chris Blair – mastering

=== Original Cast Recording ===
A double album cast recording, produced by Lloyd Webber and Nigel Wright, was released the same year featuring the original cast of the West End production.
