= The Uninvited Guest (play) =

1953 play

- Original language: English
- Written by: Mary Hayley Bell
- Genre: Drama

Premiere
- Date: 16 February 1953
- Place: Kings Theatre, Southsea

The Uninvited Guest is a 1953 play by the British writer Mary Hayley Bell.

It premiered at the Kings Theatre, Southsea before transferring to St James's Theatre in the West End where it ran for 21 performances between 27 May and 13 June 1953. The West End cast included John Mills, Joan Greenwood, Cathleen Nesbitt, Clive Morton, and Lyndon Brook. Mills, who was married to the playwright, played a son returning home after some time spent in an insane asylum. A review in The Spectator described it as a "modern and much diminished version of Oedipus emerging out of a background suggestive of Lady Chatterley's Lover".

== Bibliography ==
- Wearing, J.P. The London Stage 1950-1959: A Calendar of Productions, Performers, and Personnel. Rowman & Littlefield, 2014.
