= Mark Weedon (cricketer) =

English cricketer (born 1940)

Personal information
- Full name: Mark John Hayley Weedon
- Born: 28 October 1940 (age 86); Singapore
- Batting: Right-handed
- Bowling: Right-arm medium-pace
- Relatives: Mary Hayley Bell (aunt); Hayley Mills (cousin); Juliet Mills (cousin)

Domestic team information
- Years: Team
- 1961–1962: Cambridge University

Career statistics
Competition	First-class
Matches	17
Runs scored	164
Batting average	12.61
100s/50s	0/0
Top score	35
Balls bowled	3221
Wickets	45
Bowling average	35.64
5 wickets in innings	2
10 wickets in match	0
Best bowling	5/67
Catches/stumpings	8/–
- Source: Cricinfo, 26 May 2019

Mark John Hayley Weedon (born 28 October 1940) is an English former cricketer who played first-class cricket for Cambridge University in 1961 and 1962.

Weedon was born in Singapore after his mother had been evacuated from Hong Kong, where his father, Martin Pryce Weedon, was a captain in the Middlesex Regiment. His parents were separated and estranged during the Second World War, and later made new marriages.

He attended Harrow School before going up to Magdalene College, Cambridge. He played one full season for Cambridge in 1962, when he took 36 wickets with his medium-pace bowling and was noted for his perseverance. His best bowling figures came in the opening match of the 1962 season when he took 5 for 67 against Surrey.

After receiving an MA from Cambridge, Weedon earned an MBA from Harvard and began a career in business as a consultant and executive. He founded and ran the company BoardSearch, which specialised in senior executive appointments.

Weedon married Julie McLeod in May 1971. He is a cousin of the actresses Hayley Mills and Juliet Mills. His mother and their mother, Mary Hayley Bell, were sisters.
