= Mary Hayley Bell =

English actress, writer and dramatist (1911–2005)

- Born: 22 January 1911; Shanghai International Settlement, Shanghai, China
- Died: 1 December 2005 (aged 94); Chiltern, Buckinghamshire, England
- Occupations: Writer, actress
- Spouse: Sir John Mills (m. 1941; died 2005)
- Children: 3, including Juliet and Hayley Mills
- Relatives: Mark Weedon (nephew); Crispian Mills (grandson)

Mary Hayley Bell (Note: In this article, the surname is Bell.), Lady Mills (22 January 1911 – 1 December 2005) was an English actress and writer, married for 64 years to actor Sir John Mills. Her novel Whistle Down the Wind was adapted as a film, starring her teenaged daughter, actress Hayley Mills.

== Background ==
Mary Hayley Bell was born in Shanghai International Settlement, Shanghai, China, where her father, Colonel Francis Hayley Bell, served in the Chinese Maritime Customs Service with postings to various Treaty Ports. Her mother was Agnes (née McGowan). Her father, a Boer War veteran, served, from 1925 to 1928, as Customs Commissioner for Kowloon (within Hong Kong, although this position had no connection with the British colonial administration). During this period Mary attended school in Hong Kong and frequently spent weekends of leisure at the Commissioner's official country bungalow near Fan Ling Golf Club. The family later (1930) moved to Tianjin (then known as Tientsin). In the run-up to World War II, Francis Bell was the Defence Security Officer in Singapore in 1936 MI5. He staged a mock commando raid on Singapore's vital installations, including the naval base, where his men took control of a fuel dump, fleet of boats, and telephone exchange switchboards, in order to highlight Singapore's vulnerability to attack. This led to furious reactions from senior officials, with complaints being made to the War Office, and Bell was sacked.

== Acting roles ==
Mary Hayley Bell travelled to England to attend Malvern Girls' College and RADA. Her stage debut was in 1932 in The Barretts of Wimpole Street with an American touring company in Shanghai. On the London stage, she appeared in Vintage Wine in 1934 and further West End roles followed, as well as a tour of Australia and a New York debut in 1939. Her acting career ended on her marriage to Mills, in 1941. Later in life, she had a small uncredited role as a nursing home resident in the 1993 Eric Sykes film The Big Freeze, opposite her husband. She also appeared in her son's documentary Sir John Mills' Moving Memories (2000).

== Writings ==
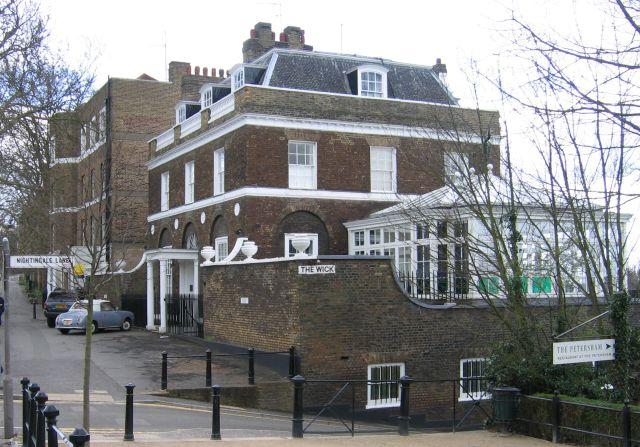
The Wick on Richmond Hill, London

Mary Hayley Bell wrote four plays: Men in Shadow (1942), Angel (1947), Duet for Two Hands (1945), and The Uninvited Guest (1953). She also wrote the novel Whistle Down the Wind (1958), co-wrote the screenplay and story of Sky West and Crooked (1966) (released as Gypsy Girl in the United States), and wrote additional dialogue for Scott of the Antarctic (1948). Whistle Down the Wind was made into a film in 1961 (starring daughter Hayley Mills) and an Andrew Lloyd Webber musical in 1996. Its title is believed to have been inspired by the sound of the wind around the bow windows of The Wick, the family's home on Richmond Hill, London.

Her 1962 novel, Far Morning, was illustrated by John Mills's niece, Molly Blake.

== Marriage and children ==
It was while living at Tianjin, China, that she first met John Mills, who was on tour at the time. They next met when she was appearing in Tony Draws a Horse at the Comedy Theatre in London in 1939. She recalled an after-dinner party in Mills's dressing room after one of his performances as George in Of Mice and Men at the Apollo Theatre.

Mills and Hayley Bell married at Marylebone Register Office in London on 16 January 1941. Mills had a 48-hour pass from the Royal Engineers, so their honeymoon at Dukes Hotel was one night. The Mills's first home was a 16th-century cottage named "Misbourne" which they purchased in 1942 and lived at until the autumn of 1945. The survival of the marriage for the 64 years until his death on 23 April 2005 is rare in show business. Mills said that he regretted that his divorce from his first wife prevented Hayley Bell from having a church wedding. They renewed their marriage vows, sixty years after they married, at St. Mary's Church in Denham, Buckinghamshire on 16 January 2001.

The Millses had three children:

- Juliet Mills (b. 1941) was star of television's Nanny and the Professor.
- Hayley Mills (b. 1946) was a Disney child star who was featured in such films as Pollyanna and the original The Parent Trap. Her son Crispian Mills became a singer with the rock band Kula Shaker.
- Jonathan Mills (b. 1949) is a writer and film producer.

== Death ==
In 1975, the Mills family bought Hills House, Denham, Buckinghamshire, a 17th-century house with a four-acre (16 000 m^{2}) garden. By 2003, it was too big and the stairs were too challenging for both Sir John and Lady Mills. They moved to a bungalow in the village in 2003. Lady Mills suffered from Alzheimer's disease and used a wheelchair in her final years. Sir John died on 23 April 2005, aged 97, in Buckinghamshire. His widow died eight months later, on 1 December 2005, aged 94.

== Sources ==
- Bell, Mary Hayley. What Shall We Do Tomorrow? An Autobiography, (London: Cassell, 1968); ISBN 0-304-93264-7
- Roisman-Cooper, Barbara. 'Sir John Mills', British Heritage, February/March 2000, p. 44
- Russell, William. 'Sir John Mills', The Herald, 25 April 2005
