= Whistle Down the Wind (novel) =

1959 British novella by Mary Hayley Bell

- First edition
- Author: Mary Hayley Bell
- Illustrator: Ōven Edwards
- Language: English
- Genre: Children's crime drama
- Publisher: T. V. Boardman and Company Limited (original U.K.)
- Publication date: 1 January 1958
- Publication place: United Kingdom
- Media type: Hardcover
- Pages: 174

Whistle Down the Wind is a novella written by Mary Hayley Bell and illustrated by Ōven Edwards. First published in 1958 by T.V. Boardman & Co., the central characters are three children: Swallow, Brat, and Poor Baby, based on the author's own children—Juliet, Hayley, and Jonathan Mills. The story is narrated by Brat.

Bell developed the concept for the story in the summer of 1957 in a gypsy caravan at the family's farm in Sussex.

The story was adapted for the 1961 film of the same name, starring the author's daughter Hayley Mills in the lead role.

== Plot ==
One day ten-year-old Brambling (nicknamed "Brat") and her seven year old brother Merlin ("Poor Baby") are told by their twelve-year-old sister Swallow that she and their five-year-old friend Elizabeth found a man hiding in a barn of the family farm who they believe to be Jesus Christ after taking his exclamation of "Jesus" literally when they asked who he was. The Man seemed feverish so the children take care of him sworn to secrecy fearing the adults would take him away.

Over the next few days, the children's school was closed with their father claiming there was a plague so the children introduce the Man to their friends who are also sworn to secrecy. Brat, Swallow and Poor Baby later learn from their grandmother that there was not actually a plague but refused to give the real reason for the school closure other than there being a scare involving the police. The children learn from a friend that the grandmother of another child named Amos Nodge told him that the police were searching for an escaped convict which the police had traced to their local area. The children's father later told them not to leave the farm and to tell him if they saw any strange men around.

The secret is finally blown after Amos, who suffered a mishap in front of the Man, betrayed them. The police arrive to arrest the Man, who they call Blake, believing him to be the convict but not before a large group of children, some from far away, gathered in front of them and the Man set the barn and the oast house on fire and escaped. The children's father shows Brat, Swallow and Poor Baby a cross left behind on a wall still standing after the blaze and they assure him that the whole affair has not changed how they felt about Jesus.
