= Wuthering Heights (2003 film) =

2003 film directed by Suri Krishnamma

- Genre: Teen; Romance; Musical
- Based on: Wuthering Heights by Emily Brontë
- Screenplay by: Max Enscoe; Annie deYoung
- Story by: Jim Steinman; Patricia Knop
- Directed by: Suri Krishnamma
- Starring: Erika Christensen; Mike Vogel; Christopher Masterson; Katherine Heigl; John Doe; Aimee Osbourne
- Theme music composer: Stephen Trask
- Original language: English

Production
- Producer: Donald L. West
- Cinematography: Claudio Chea
- Editor: Jeff Wishengrad
- Running time: 88 minutes
- Production company: MTV Studios
- Budget: $3.5 million

Original release
- Network: MTV
- Release: September 14, 2003

Wuthering Heights is a 2003 American teen romance musical television film, a contemporary adaptation of Emily Brontë's 1847 novel of the same name, adapted by Max Enscoe and Annie deYoung from an original story by Jim Steinman and Patricia Knop. Produced for MTV, the film stars Erika Christensen, Mike Vogel, Christopher Masterson, Katherine Heigl, John Doe and Aimee Osbourne. Although set in California, filming took place in Cabo Rojo, Puerto Rico.

Steinman serves as executive producer, and the film features his song "The Future Ain't What It Used to Be", which originally appeared on Original Sin, the concept album he wrote and produced for Pandora's Box. Wuthering Heights is one of Steinman's favourite books, and it was the inspiration for his song "It's All Coming Back to Me Now".

== Plot summary ==
Cate lives in a lighthouse called The Heights with her father Earnshaw and brother Hendrix. During a storm, Earnshaw encounters a child living on his own and takes him in. Cate immediately likes the child, naming him Heath, while her brother dislikes him, calling him It.

Cate shows Heath a secret cave near the lighthouse. Heath tells Cate the first of many tall tales about his past. A montage begins: Heath and Cate share a kiss; the siblings grow to be teenagers; Heath becomes a musician; Hendrix clashes with Earnshaw.

Cate encounters the wealthy Edward and Isabel Linton at a nearby house and wants to get to know them. Heath grows jealous and demands she leave with him.

Earnshaw passes away, leaving "everything" to Hendrix, who lays out restrictive house rules for Heath and taunts him. Heath attempts to kill Hendrix and is stopped by Cate with a shovel. Heath leaves town.

Cate gets in a car accident and is rescued by Edward. She moves in with the Lintons. When Heath returns, he crashes a party and shouts at Cate, who sends him away. Heath overhears her say that she isn't in love with him. He leaves before she completes her thought: she can't live without him and feels they are the same person.

Isabel asks Heath to stay in her dorm room and they begin a relationship, though Heath is dismissive and unkind to her. Isabel becomes Heath's unofficial publicist, saying "Let me discover you! Let me discover you!" Heath becomes a star. She realizes he still loves Cate and is devastated.

Cate marries Edward. Heath buys Hendrix's house and throws him out. Heath and Cate reunite for a night and Cate becomes pregnant. She decides to stay with Edward because being with Heath is too painful.

Cate’s pregnancy is difficult. Edward grows angry and jealous about Heath, coming to a boil over the parentage of Cate’s child. As Edward yells, Cate goes into labor and flees to the secret cave. Heath finds her there and assists in the child’s birth. Cate dies. Heath claims the baby. Cate becomes a ghost, knowing she was meant to stay at The Heights to watch her daughter grow.

== Cast ==
- Erika Christensen as Cate
  - Katelin Petersen as Young Cate/Cate's Daughter
- Mike Vogel as Heath
  - Adam Taylor Gordon as Young Heath
- Christopher Kennedy Masterson as Edward
- Johnny Whitworth as Hendrix
  - Seth Adkins as Young Hendrix
- Katherine M. Heigl as Isabel Linton
- John Doe as Earnshaw
- Aimee Osbourne as Raquelle

== Soundtrack album ==
The original soundtrack album (produced by Steinman, except where indicated below) was co-released by Ravenous Records and the MTV Original Movies label in November 2003. The track list is:

- "Prelude: The Future Ain't What It Used to Be" (Jim Steinman)

Vocals by Erika Christensen (a capella)

- "More" (Andrew Eldritch/Steinman)

Vocals by Erika Christensen and Mike Vogel
Co-produced by Steven Rinkoff and Jeff Bova
Arranged by Steinman and Bova

- "I Will Crumble" (Hewitt Huntwork)

Vocals by Erika Christensen and Mike Vogel
Vocal tracks produced by Steinman and Rinkoff
Instrumental track produced and arranged by Bova

- "If It Ain't Broke (Break It)" (Steinman)

Vocals by Mike Vogel
Co-produced by Rinkoff, Bova and Pat Thrall
Arranged by Steinman and Bova
Guitars: Thrall
Drums: Sammy Merendino

- "Shine" (Huntwork)

Vocals by Mike Vogel
Produced by Steinman and Rinkoff
Guitars: Huntwork

- "The Future Ain't What It Used To Be" (Steinman)

Vocals by Erika Christensen
Co-produced by Rinkoff
Piano: Roy Bittan

"If It Ain't Broke (Break It)" and "The Future Ain't What It Used to Be" were both recorded by Meat Loaf for his 2006 album Bat Out of Hell III: The Monster Is Loose. The latter had previously appeared on the Steinman-produced 1989 concept album Original Sin, by Pandora's Box. "More" was originally written and recorded for The Sisters of Mercy's 1990 album Vision Thing.

=== Personnel ===
- Soundtrack Produced by Jim Steinman
- Music Supervisor: Amy Rosen
- Recorded and Mixed by: Steven Rinkoff
- Production coordinator for Jim Steinman Productions: Don Ketteler
- Recorded and mixed at The Hit Factory, Bovaland and Dome Logic (NYC)
- Mastered at The Hit Factory by Tony Gillis

== Production notes ==
This movie was filmed in Puerto Rico.
