= Bad for Good =

Studio album by Jim Steinman
- Released: April 1981
- Recorded: August 1980 – March 1981
- Studios: Power Station, New York City; Record Plant, New York City; Bearsville, Woodstock, New York
- Genres: Rock, hard rock, heartland rock, instrumental rock, progressive rock, Wagnerian rock
- Length: 61:52
- Label: Epic
- Producers: John Jansen, Todd Rundgren, Jim Steinman, Jimmy Iovine; Andrew Kazdin ("The Storm")

Jim Steinman chronology
Bat Out of Hell (1977)	Bad for Good (1981)	Original Sin (1989)

Singles from Bad for Good
- 1. "Rock and Roll Dreams Come Through" Released: May 22, 1981; 2. "Lost Boys and Golden Girls" Released: August 28, 1981; 3. "Dance in My Pants" Released: October 30, 1981

Bad for Good is the only studio album by American songwriter Jim Steinman. It was released in April 1981. Steinman wrote all of the songs and performed on most, although Rory Dodd contributed lead vocals on some tracks.

The songs were originally intended to be recorded by Meat Loaf as a follow-up to Bat Out of Hell, titled Renegade Angel. However, Meat Loaf suffered vocal problems and was unable to sing. He would record several tracks from Bad for Good for his later albums.

Critical reaction to the album was mixed, with a majority of the criticism directed at Steinman's vocals. However, the album was a major commercial success, breaking the UK Top 10.

== History ==
In the midst of the success of Bat Out of Hell, management and the record company put pressure on Steinman to stop touring in order to write a follow-up, provisionally titled Renegade Angel. Steinman joined Meat Loaf and his band for a live performance in Toronto, Ontario, Canada in 1978 with the intention of going through the songs for the new album after the show. However, someone broke into their dressing rooms during the show and stole several possessions, including the new lyric book. Many of the stolen songs would later appear on Bad for Good: "Surf's Up", "Left in the Dark" and "Out of the Frying Pan." Meat Loaf joked that he did not think Steinman ever got over that theft.

Meat Loaf lost his voice and was unable to record Renegade Angel. Steinman said "I spent seven months trying to make a follow-up [to Bat] with him, and it was an infernal nightmare. He had lost his voice, he had lost his house, and he was pretty much losing his mind." Not being able to "bear for people not to hear those songs," Steinman recorded the album, retitled Bad for Good, as a solo project, with Rory Dodd providing lead vocals on some songs. Many musicians and backing vocalists from Bat Out of Hell performed on Bad for Good, including Roy Bittan and Max Weinberg from Bruce Springsteen's E Street Band.

Richard Corben illustrated the cover, as he had done for Bat Out of Hell. Describing the cover, Sounds magazine said "the flesh, the puppy-fat on the mid-calf, the breasts, the upturned American nose ... Corben's evocation of teenage femininity is so right! The cover, though, is the product of an alternative universe, like everything else about this album. The nude gymnasium scene is out, along with the other title 'Renegade Angel'."

Around this time, Steinman contributed all eight songs for Meat Loaf's album Dead Ringer, which was also released in 1981.

== Compositions ==
The first two songs, "Bad for Good" and "Lost Boys and Golden Girls", were two of many songs written by Steinman under the inspiration of Peter Pan and lost boys who never grow up. This is reflected in lyrics in "Bad for Good" such as "You know I'm gonna be like this forever: I'm never gonna be what I should." The composer says that Peter Pan has "always been about my favorite story and I've always looked at it from the perspective that it's a great rock 'n' roll myth because it's about – when you get right down to it – it's about a gang of lost boys who never grow up, who are going to be young forever and that's about as perfect an image for rock'n'roll as I can think of." "Lost Boys and Golden Girls" is the basis for the musical Neverland, which Steinman says is "a rock 'n' roll science fiction version of Peter Pan that takes place in a city built on the ruins of Los Angeles after a series of chemical wars." Neverland never got past the workshop stage, although Bat Out of Hell: The Musical, which premiered in 2017, is based on the same concept.

The next track, "Love and Death and an American Guitar", is a spoken word fantasy monologue, performed by Steinman that he used to do in the Meat Loaf shows. It opens by quoting lyrics from Bat Out of Hell's "Paradise by the Dashboard Light" ("I remember everything. I remember every little thing as if it happened only yesterday. I was barely seventeen"), but instead of being "barely dressed" the protagonist "once killed a boy with a Fender guitar." Influenced by The Doors, Steinman wanted to write a piece where "the rhythm wasn't coming from the drums so much as the voice – the rhythm of the spoken voice and the heartbeat behind it."

"You're never alone, 'cause you can put on the 'phones
And let the drummer tell your heart what to do."

— "Rock and Roll Dreams Come Through"

The final two tracks were originally packaged with the LP on an additional vinyl disc. "The Storm" is an orchestral piece. "Rock and Roll Dreams Come Through" is, according to music website Sputnik Music, a celebration of "music being the only thing left to believe in, it is a cry to the musical gods, thanking them for the gifts they have been given." Similarly, AllMusic describes the song as "a heart-tugging testament to the inspirational power of rock and roll."

== Reception ==
Professional ratings
Review scores
Source	Rating
AllMusic	2.5/5 stars
People	Positive
Sounds	5/5 stars
Record Mirror	4/4 stars

In addition to breaking the UK Top 10, the album reached number 63 in the Billboard Pop Albums chart, and peaked at number 14 in the Swedish Top 60 Albums. "Rock and Roll Dreams Come Through" was released as the first single, reaching 14 in the Mainstream Rock chart, and number 32 in the Pop Singles chart.

The critical reaction to the album was mixed. Many reviews commented that Steinman's singing voice was inadequate for the songs. Rolling Stone, who also gave a lukewarm review of the first Bat, said "Steinman's thin, reedy voice simply cannot carry the absurd precocity of the lyrics". AllMusic also said retrospectively that Steinman "simply does not have the vocal range or lung power necessary to make this dramatic style of rock and roll work. For example...[in] "Left in the Dark", he struggles to keep up with vocal demands of this orchestral ballad, resulting in a vocal that sounds strained and occasionally off-key". Billboard magazine, though, said that "to the surprise of many, Steinman's vocals sounded stronger than expected".

AllMusic also complained "that some of the songs repeat the Bat Out of Hell formula instead of building upon it; the obvious culprit in this arena is "Dance in My Pants", a duet that gratuitously recycles the battle of the sexes verbal sparring and the multi-part structure of Meat Loaf's "Paradise by the Dashboard Light" to less-impressive effect". However, they did praise "Surf's Up" and "Rock and Roll Dreams Come Through". They concluded that the album "is too inconsistent and eccentric to keep the attention of the casual listener, but remains an interesting listen for anyone who appreciates Jim Steinman's one-of-a-kind style of epic-size rock and roll".

Rolling Stone criticized the "Wagnerian excess, feral "rock" playing and vile choristering," suggesting that "Todd Rundgren should have his wrists slapped for choking the upper end of his guitar's neck in a vainglorious approximation of epiphany". Sounds magazine offered a positive review, saying that it is the album "you've waited nearly four years for".

== Legacy ==
Many of the tracks, or elements thereof, on Bad for Good have been recorded by other artists, including projects that Steinman has been involved in. He produced Barbra Streisand recording "Left in the Dark" for her album Emotion, with the single reaching No. 4 on the Adult Contemporary chart in 1984. Her version changes a few lines, with her version changing "so take off your dress" to "I watch you undress", to fit the song being sung from a female point of view.

The intro to "Stark Raving Love" was used for "Holding Out for a Hero", a 1984 hit for Bonnie Tyler. He used excerpts from "The Storm" for "Opening of the Box" on the Pandora's Box album Original Sin, and in the "Ouverture" for the musical Dance of the Vampires.

The refrain from "Bad for Good" ("God speed! Speed us away!") also appears in "Nowhere Fast", which Steinman wrote for the film Streets of Fire (1984).

Comedy duo Scharpling & Wurster, in their sketch "The Gas Station Dogs" from their album New Hope for the Ape-Eared, featured a delusional singer-songwriter promoting a song called "Rock n' Roll Dreams Will Come Through".

Meat Loaf has recorded most of Bad for Good:

- "Surf's Up" appears on his 1984 album Bad Attitude;
- "Rock and Roll Dreams Come Through", "Out of the Frying Pan (and Into the Fire)", "Love and Death and an American Guitar" (renamed "Wasted Youth", and still using Steinman's original voice with a new backing track), and "Lost Boys and Golden Girls" appear on Bat Out of Hell II: Back into Hell. These were the only covers of Meat Loaf's from Bad for Good that were produced by Steinman;
- "Left in the Dark" appears on Welcome to the Neighborhood (1995) (Meat uses the last line of Steinman's spoken word opening to the song, "who made the very first move" to end his version);
- "Bad for Good" on Bat Out of Hell III: The Monster Is Loose, with guest performer Brian May on guitar. In a documentary promoting the 2006 album, Meat Loaf acknowledged that there is a "core of fans that know that song", so he "had that under the microscope more than any other on the album". An excerpt of "The Storm" is used as the intro to "Seize the Night" on Bat III.

== Track listing ==
All tracks are written by Jim Steinman.

Side one
No.	Title	Length
1.	"Bad for Good"	8:45
2.	"Lost Boys and Golden Girls"	4:36
3.	"Love and Death and an American Guitar"	2:38
4.	"Stark Raving Love"	7:23

Side two
No.	Title	Length
5.	"Out of the Frying Pan (And into the Fire)"	6:12
6.	"Surf's Up"	5:25
7.	"Dance in My Pants" (duet with Karla DeVito)	7:58
8.	"Left in the Dark"	7:58

Extra EP
No.	Title	Producer(s)	Length
1.	"The Storm"	Andrew Kazdin	4:28
2.	"Rock and Roll Dreams Come Through"	Jimmy Iovine; Jim Steinman	6:29

On the original vinyl release, "The Storm" and "Rock and Roll Dreams Come Through" are the A-side and B-side, respectively, of a 33-rpm 7" single, enclosed with the album. These tracks, according to Steinman's concept, are supposed to be the prelude and epilogue, respectively, of the album. The position of these tracks varies on the various versions: Most CDs include both at the end of the album, while cassettes place "Rock and Roll Dreams" at track 5 and "The Storm" at the end. An Australian CD release from 1989 places "The Storm" at track 1 and "Rock and Roll Dreams Come Through" at the end.

== Personnel ==
Musicians

- Jim Steinman – lead vocals (except on "Lost Boys and Golden Girls", "Surf's Up" and "Rock and Roll Dreams Come Through"), co-lead vocals on “Dance in My Pants”, keyboards, spoken word
- Rory Dodd – lead vocals on "Lost Boys and Golden Girls", "Surf's Up" and "Rock and Roll Dreams Come Through"; backing vocals
- Karla DeVito – co-lead vocals on "Dance in My Pants"
- Todd Rundgren – guitars, backing vocals
- Davey Johnstone – guitars on "Bad for Good", "Stark Raving Love", "Surf's Up" and "Rock and Roll Dreams Come Through"; mandolin on "Surf's Up"
- Kasim Sulton – bass on "Bad for Good", "Out of the Frying Pan" and "Surf's Up"; backing vocals
- Steve Buslowe – bass on "Stark Raving Love", "Dance in My Pants" and "Rock and Roll Dreams Come Through"
- Neil Jason – bass on "Left in the Dark"
- Roy Bittan – piano (except on "Left in the Dark")
- Steven Margoshes – piano on "Left in the Dark", conductor (New York Philharmonic) on "The Storm", string arrangement on "Rock and Roll Dreams Come Through"
- Roger Powell – synthesizer on "Bad for Good", "Stark Raving Love" and "Dance in My Pants"
- Larry "Synergy" Fast – synthesizer on "Love and Death and an American Guitar"
- Max Weinberg – drums (except on "Stark Raving Love", "Dance in My Pants" and "Left in the Dark")
- Allan Schwartzberg – drums on "Left in the Dark"
- Joe Stefko – drums on "Stark Raving Love" and "Dance in My Pants"
- Jimmy Maelen – percussion
- Alan Rubin – trumpet on "Dance in My Pants" and "Rock and Roll Dreams Come Through"
- Tom Malone – horn arrangements and trombone on "Dance in My Pants" and "Rock and Roll Dreams Come Through"
- Lew Del Gatto – baritone saxophone on "Dance in My Pants" and "Rock and Roll Dreams Come Through"
- Lou Marini – tenor saxophone on "Dance in My Pants" and "Rock and Roll Dreams Come Through", solo on "Rock and Roll Dreams Come Through"
- Ellen Foley – backing vocals on "Bad for Good" and "Out of the Frying Pan"
- Eric Troyer – backing vocals
- Wil Malone – string arrangement on "Out of the Frying Pan"
- Charles Calello – conductor (New York Philharmonic) on "Left in the Dark"

Production

- Producers: John Jansen, Todd Rundgren, Jim Steinman, Jimmy Iovine
- Engineers: Tom Edmonds, John Jansen, Todd Rundgren, Gray Russell, Shelly Yakus
- Mixing: John Jansen
- Mastering: Greg Calbi, Ted Jensen, George Marino
- Production coordination: Gray Russell
- Arrangers: Roy Bittan, Todd Rundgren, Jim Steinman
- Art direction: John Berg
- Cover art concept: Jim Steinman
- Cover art: Richard Corben
- Photography: Don Hunstein

== Charts ==
Chart (1981)	Peak position
Australian Albums (Kent Music Report)	5
Canada Top Albums/CDs (RPM)	36
German Albums (Offizielle Top 100)	45
Dutch Albums (Album Top 100)	33
New Zealand Albums (RMNZ)	19
Swedish Albums (Sverigetopplistan)	14
UK Albums (Official Charts)	7
US Billboard 200	63

== Certifications ==
Certifications for Bad for Good
Region	Certification	Certified units/sales
Canada (Music Canada)	Gold	50,000^{^}
United Kingdom (BPI)	Silver	60,000^{^}
^{^} Shipments figures based on certification alone.
