= Holly Sherwood =

American rock vocalist

Holly Sherwood is an American rock vocalist, best known for her work with Jim Steinman, providing both lead and backing vocals.

== Acting career ==
At the age of three, Holly Sherwood began her professional career as the star of Procter and Gamble's "Rosemary's Reflects" Ivory Soap commercials. As she grew, she and four of her sisters were cast in a production of Richard Rodgers' The Sound of Music, which led to appearances in no less than eighteen other productions of the show. In 1966, she was cast in the Broadway revival of Annie Get Your Gun, where her talent was noticed by the show's composer Irving Berlin, who added a new song tailored to her abilities. This was followed by an appearance in the Los Angeles premiere of Leonard Bernstein's MASS.

Later in her career, she appeared on television in Steven Bochco's Cop Rock for ABC, and was at one point part of the musical support for Saturday Night Live, performing comical jingles; she also provided background vocals for Olivia Newton-John's performance of "Physical"

== Recording career ==
In March 1972, she embarked on a solo career with her first single, "Day by Day", a cover of a song from the popular Broadway musical Godspell (which also incorporated a medley of two other numbers from the show), produced by Tony Orlando for Rocky Road Records. Her version went to #104 on the Billboard Bubbling Under the Hot 100 chart, and also charted in the United Kingdom. In 1973, she released the song "Yesterday and You", a Top 30 single on the Easy Listening chart and #117 on the Bubbling Under chart.

In the late 1970s, she performed a duet with Leonard Coleman Boone called "There's No Me Without You", and was a part of the musical group Wondergap with Jim Ryan and Andy Goldmark, signed to A&M Records. Later in her career, she recorded background vocals for Billy Joel and Kenny Loggins, sang with Cindy Bullens on the MCA release "The Touch", and performed with Joe Cocker, Arlo Guthrie, and Pete Seeger (on his Hudson Valley Sloop tour, singing with the Rooster River Boys).

== Jim Steinman ==
In 1983, Sherwood began an extended association with Jim Steinman when she performed background vocals for Bonnie Tyler on her smash hit album Faster Than the Speed of Night, produced by Steinman. Her voice can be heard on several tracks of the album including the international hit single "Total Eclipse of the Heart" as well as the album's six-and-a-half-minute title track in which Sherwood performed a distinctive "vocal wail" towards the end of the song. She became part of a group of regular background vocalists, including Bat Out of Hell veteran Rory Dodd and Eric Troyer, who appeared frequently on Steinman product during the 1980s, including tracks recorded by diverse artists such as Barry Manilow, Barbra Streisand, and Tyler, both performing and arranging background vocals.

=== Fire Inc. ===
Among other credits, Laurie Sargent of Face to Face, Dodd, Sherwood, and Troyer formed the nucleus of the impromptu band Fire Inc., created by Steinman to perform two songs he had written for Walter Hill's "rock and roll fable" Streets of Fire. Sherwood's performances with Laurie Sargent's vocals on the songs "Nowhere Fast" and "Tonight Is What It Means to Be Young" were dubbed over Diane Lane's in the movie.

=== Pandora's Box ===
Steinman formed another group, Pandora's Box, which released one album, Original Sin, in 1989. In addition to background vocals, Sherwood sang lead on the track "Good Girls Go to Heaven (Bad Girls Go Everywhere)", later covered by Meat Loaf on his album Bat Out of Hell II: Back into Hell. According to Steinman, she also recorded a demo of "It's All Coming Back to Me Now", later a hit for Celine Dion in 1996, in connection with this album, but her take was passed over in favor of fellow vocalist Elaine Caswell's.

== Later life ==
According to the publicly accessible portion of her LinkedIn profile, Sherwood later went on to work as a screenplay writer for Sherwood Scott Artists LLC, based in New Mexico, for 20 years and lives on the East Coast.

She also briefly owned The Sherwood Gallery, which featured a collection of rare artwork.

As of now, she has no plans to make an album of her own.
