= Good Girls Go to Heaven (Bad Girls Go Everywhere) =

1986 song written by Jim Steinman

"悲しみは続かない (Sadness Doesn't Last)"

Single by Megumi Shiina
- Released: 1986
- Genre: J-pop
- Length: 3:54
- Label: TDK
- Composer: Jim Steinman
- Lyricist: Keiko Aso
- Producer: Osamu Totsuka

"Good Girls Go to Heaven (Bad Girls Go Everywhere)" is a song written by Jim Steinman. It was first performed by Megumi Shiina as "Kanashimi Wa Tsudzukanai" (悲しみは続かない, lit. "sadness doesn't last") and used as the opening to the 1986 Japanese TV drama Kono Ko Dare no Ko? The song was first performed in English by Pandora's Box, on their 1989 album, Original Sin, with Holly Sherwood singing lead vocals.

Like many Steinman song titles, this one appears to be derived from a popular expression, or figure of speech. "Good girls go to heaven, but bad girls go everywhere" made its way into popular culture through entertainer Mae West and also Helen Gurley Brown, author of the book Sex and the Single Girl.

The song was recorded by Meat Loaf on his 1993 album, Bat Out of Hell II: Back into Hell.

== Megumi Shiina version ==
The song was first released as "Kanashimi Wa Tsudzukanai" (悲しみは続かない, lit. "sadness doesn't last") in 1986, by Megumi Shiina (椎名恵). It was used as the opening theme for the Japanese TV drama Kono Ko Dare no Ko? (このこ誰の子?, lit. "whose child is this?"). Despite this version having a different title, the sleeve for the 7-inch single still shows the English name as "Good Girls Go to Heaven, Bad Girls Go Everywhere". The credits list Jim Steinman (as ジム・スタインマン) as composer, with the Japanese lyrics written by Keiko Aso (麻生圭子). This version was arranged by Osamu Totsuka (戸塚修).

== Pandora's Box version ==
"Good Girls Go to Heaven (Bad Girls Go Everywhere)"

Single by Pandora's Box

from the album Original Sin
- B-side: "Requiem Metal"
- Released: February 19, 1990
- Length: 6:24 (main version); 3:38 (7-inch edit)
- Label: Virgin
- Songwriter: Jim Steinman
- Producer: Jim Steinman

Pandora's Box singles chronology
"It's All Coming Back to Me Now" (1989)	"Good Girls Go to Heaven (Bad Girls Go Everywhere)" (1990)	"Safe Sex (When It Comes 2 Loving U)" (1990)

Music video
- "Good Girls Go to Heaven (Bad Girls Go Everywhere)" on YouTube

American girl group Pandora's Box covered the song in English and released it as a single in the UK on February 19, 1990. The song was issued as a 7-inch single that also included the instrumental tracks "Requiem Metal" and "Pray Lewd". The 12-inch single replaces "Pray Lewd" with "Pandora's House – Room by Room". This version peaked at number 100 on the UK Singles Chart.

=== Music video ===
A video for the Pandora's Box version was directed by Brian Grant. Set in a prison, it shows the arrival of a new inmate called Jenny (the name featured in the first chorus) and her induction. As the song begins, the other inmates dance around her. Holly Sherwood doesn't appear in this video. Instead, a female dancer lip-syncs to her vocals.

=== Critical reception ===
Upon its release, Guy Holland of the Chester Chronicle said the "up-tempo rock 'n' roller pounds out in the best traditions of Bonnie Tyler's greatest works" and "may even sound too much like Miss Tyler, but in my book that is far from a crime". He concluded, "Steinman is probably not going to win over any Jive Bunny fans, but with this piece he surely stands a chance with every other member of the music listening population!" Phil Wilding of Kerrang! stated there is "no denying Steinman's demented twist on reality is nothing less than special" and continued, "Pandora's Box are the third coming on a wave of giant proportions, crazed stars each and every one of them." Chris Roberts of Melody Maker was negative in his review, calling Steinman the "third-rate Dalí of pomp-rock" and the song a "windy opus" that "does not cause me to reel in reflected grandeur or indeed to rock out". He concluded that, "its title aside", the song is "as provocative as a biro top".

=== Personnel ===
- Holly Sherwood – lead vocals
- Eddie Martinez – guitars
- Steve Buslowe – bass
- Roy Bittan – piano
- Jim Steinman – keyboards
- Jeff Bova – keyboards, synths, programming
- Jimmy Bralower – drums, programming
- Todd Rundgren, Eric Troyer, Rory Dodd – backing vocals

Arranged by Jim Steinman, Roy Bittan, and the band
Backing vocals arranged by Todd Rundgren and Eric Troyer

== Meat Loaf version ==
"Good Girls Go to Heaven (Bad Girls Go Everywhere)"

Song by Meat Loaf

from the album Bat Out of Hell II: Back into Hell
- Length: 6:53
- Label: Virgin
- Songwriter: Jim Steinman
- Producer: Jim Steinman

The song was recorded by American singer Meat Loaf for his 1993 album, Bat Out of Hell II: Back into Hell, which was also produced by Steinman. The record contained two tracks from Original Sin, the other being "It Just Won't Quit".

The main guitar melody of this version was reused in the instrumental track on Back into Hell. It was also the main melody of "Carpe Noctem", from the Steinman musical Tanz Der Vampire (which Meat Loaf also recorded as "Seize the Night" on Bat Out of Hell III: The Monster Is Loose, leaving the melody intact).

=== Personnel ===
- Meat Loaf – lead vocals
- Eddie Martinez – guitars
- Steve Buslowe – bass
- Roy Bittan – piano
- Jeff Bova – synths, programming
- Jimmy Bralower – drums
- Lenny Pickett – saxophones
- Todd Rundgren, Rory Dodd, Kasim Sulton, Amy Goff, Elaine Goff, Curtis King – backing vocals
