= Original Sin (Pandora's Box album) =

Studio album by Pandora's Box
- Released: November 6, 1989
- Studio: Power Station, New York City
- Genre: Wagnerian rock; art pop; progressive pop
- Length: 67:19
- Label: Virgin
- Producer: Jim Steinman; co-produced by Roy Bittan & Larry Alexander

Jim Steinman chronology
Bad for Good (1981)	Original Sin (1989)	Bat Out of Hell II: Back into Hell (1993)

Singles from Original Sin
- 1. "It's All Coming Back to Me Now" Released: October 2, 1989; 2. "Good Girls Go to Heaven (Bad Girls Go Everywhere)" Released: February 19, 1990; 3. "Safe Sex (When It Comes 2 Loving U)" Released: June 11, 1990

Professional ratings
Review scores
Source	Rating
AllMusic	4/5 stars
Kerrang!	4/5 stars
New Musical Express	5/10

Original Sin is a concept album performed by Pandora's Box and produced by Jim Steinman. It was released on November 6, 1989. Steinman wrote the majority of this album, although there are a couple of cover versions. It was the group's only album, and was a commercial flop.

Although the album was not a commercial success (except in South Africa), many of the songs have gone platinum with other artists. Steinman is said to have been very proud of the songs on this album, even though Original Sin sold very poorly in comparison with his highest selling albums and songs. The album charted at No. 43 in Sweden.

The album was re-released in 2006 along with a DVD featuring the videos for "It's All Coming Back to Me Now" and "Good Girls Go to Heaven (Bad Girls Go Everywhere)", a featurette featuring interviews and performances by Steinman.

== Videos ==
Music videos were produced for the songs "It's All Coming Back to Me Now" and "Good Girls Go to Heaven".

Ken Russell directed the video for "It's All Coming Back to Me Now". It was filmed at Pinewood Studios in Buckinghamshire. Steinman wrote the script, based on Russell's segment in the compilation opera movie Aria. Elements include leather, snakes, tombstones and cockrings with shrunken heads, and the video features singer Elaine Caswell as a girl near death—from a motorcycle crash—being ministered to by paramedics, fantasising and being 'sexually aroused by a large python and writhing on a bed that lit up in time with the music, while surrounded by a group of bemused, semi-naked dancers'. When Steinman's manager saw it, he responded 'It's a porno movie!' The two-day shoot ran over schedule and budget, costing £35,000 an hour. Russell and Steinman even designed a sequence where a motorcyclist would cycle up the steps of a local church-tower, jump out of the turrets at the top, and then explode; alas, the wardens of the church refused permission.

The video for "Good Girls Go to Heaven", directed by Brian Grant, was set in a prison. It shows the arrival of a new inmate called Jenny (the name featured in the first chorus) and her induction. As the song begins, the other inmates dance around her. As the prison is signposted as "Pandora's House Of Detention", matching the phrasing in the song "City Night" from Jim Steinman's Neverland / Bat 2100, we can assume this video was intended to depict something within Steinman's "Obsidian" mythos (the 40+ year project which culminated with Bat Out of Hell: The Musical). The only member of Pandora's Box to appear in the video is Ellen Foley (and only as part of the dance ensemble) - although vocals for this song were performed by Holly Sherwood.

== Track listing ==
All tracks are written by Jim Steinman, except where otherwise noted.

Original album
No.	Title	Writer(s)	Performer(s)	Length
1.	"The Invocation" (The Chill (1963))	Ross Macdonald (uncredited)	Ellen Foley	0:21
2.	"Original Sin (The Natives Are Restless Tonight)"		Foley; Gina Taylor; Elaine Caswell; Deliria Wilde; Holly Sherwood; Laura Theodore (intro and outro)	6:27
3.	"Twentieth Century Fox"	The Doors; Alfred Newman (uncredited sample); Jimi Hendrix (uncredited sample)	Foley; Cincinnati Pops Orchestra, conducted by Erich Kunzel (intro)	5:32
4.	"Safe Sex"		Taylor	6:24
5.	"Good Girls Go to Heaven (Bad Girls Go Everywhere)"		Sherwood	6:25
6.	"Requiem Metal" (excerpt from Requiem, instrumental)	Giuseppe Verdi	Warsaw National Philharmonic Orchestra, conducted by Kazimierz Kord	0:52
7.	"I've Been Dreaming Up a Storm Lately" (monologue)		Steinman	3:03
8.	"It's All Coming Back to Me Now"		Caswell	8:22
9.	"The Opening of the Box" (excerpt from "The Storm", instrumental, produced by Andrew Kazdin)		New York Philharmonic, conducted by Steven Margoshes	2:00
10.	"The Want Ad" (monologue)		Foley	2:44
11.	"My Little Red Book"	Burt Bacharach; Hal David	Foley	4:11
12.	"It Just Won't Quit"		Caswell	6:39
13.	"Pray Lewd" (solo piano medley of "Original Sin", "It's All Coming Back to Me Now" and "It Just Won't Quit", instrumental)		Margoshes	3:38
14.	"The Future Ain't What It Used to Be"		Taylor	10:32
Total length:				67:10

Bonus tracks (2006 digital release)
No.	Title	Writer(s)	Performer(s)	Length
1.	"Pandora's House: Room By Room" (edit from promo single, medley of all tracks except "It's All Coming Back to Me Now")	Steinman; Verdi; The Doors; Bachrach; David	Various artists	12:18
2.	"A Teenager In Love" (interpolation of "I've Been Dreaming Up A Storm Lately" and "Nocturnal Pleasure", monologue)		Steinman	0:57
3.	"It's All Coming Back to Me Now" (single edit)		Caswell	6:35
4.	"Good Girls Go to Heaven (Bad Girls Go Everywhere)" (single edit)		Sherwood	4:36
5.	"Safe Sex (When It Comes 2 Loving U)"		Taylor	4:18
Total length:				28:44

== Cover versions ==
Steinman regularly reworked previous material for a newer project, and much of Original Sin was recycled, as listed in the table below. Some demo versions of tracks recorded by others are listed. Some tracks were intended to be released on The Dream Engine's debut album.

Track no.	Title	Subsequent cover versions
1	The Invocation	Featured in Jim Steinman's musical Neverland, and subsequently reused in Bat Out of Hell: The Musical.
2	Original Sin (The Natives Are Restless Tonight)	Taylor Dayne on the soundtrack to the 1994 movie version of The Shadow (titled as "Original Sin (Theme from the Shadow)"); Meat Loaf on Welcome to the Neighborhood; rewritten as "Gott ist tot" ("God is Dead") and "Einladung zum Ball" ("Invitation to the Ball") for Tanz der Vampire (Dance of the Vampires)
3	Twentieth Century Fox	Cover version: The Doors (1967), though the gender pronouns have been switched to indicate a male "fox". The song opens with the 20th Century Fox Fanfare before sampling Foxy Lady by Jimi Hendrix and includes a snippet of "Light My Fire" at the end. A new lyric during the bridge refers to "In the Midnight Hour" by Wilson Pickett.
4	Safe Sex	A demo of "Safe Sex" performed by Canadian vocalist Karine Hannah has been leaked onto the internet from the period when she was working with Steinman on an ill-fated album; it was expected to appear on The Dream Engine's debut album
5	Good Girls Go to Heaven (Bad Girls Go Everywhere)	The first version of this song ever released was in Japanese, by Megumi Shiina under the name 悲しみは続かない ("Kanashimi wa tsuzukanai") in 1986, and used as opening theme for 1986-1987 Japanese drama このこ誰の子? (Kono ko dare no ko?). Meat Loaf on Bat Out of Hell II: Back into Hell. Also performed in early Manchester previews of Bat Out of Hell: The Musical and included in the Official Cast Recording.
6	Requiem Metal	Re-used as backing track for "Wasted Youth" on Meat Loaf's Bat Out of Hell II: Back into Hell
7	I've Been Dreaming up a Storm Lately	An earlier version of this piece featured in Steinman's 1969 musical The Dream Engine. Re-used in an early draft of Dance of the Vampires, and in Bat Out Of Hell: The Musical.
8	It's All Coming Back to Me Now	Céline Dion on Falling into You; Meat Loaf and Marion Raven on Bat Out of Hell III: The Monster Is Loose. Featured in all versions of Bat Out Of Hell: The Musical.
9	The Opening of the Box	The first incarnation of this melody was heard as the introduction to "Hymn to Fire" within Jim Steinman's play The Dream Engine in 1969. Re-used in Dance of the Vampires
10	The Want Ad	Featured in Jim Steinman's musicals The Dream Engine (1969) and Neverland (1977)
11	My Little Red Book	This is a cover version: written by Burt Bacharach; the arrangement closely follows the cover by Love on their first album.
12	It Just Won't Quit	Meat Loaf on Bat Out of Hell II: Back into Hell. Featured in Bat Out of Hell: The Musical in the initial Manchester and London runs, and included in the Original Cast Recording.
13	Pray Lewd	Covered at some Dream Engine/Over the Top concerts
14	The Future Ain't What It Used to Be	Erika Christensen on Wuthering Heights OST (re-using the original Roy Bittan piano track); Meat Loaf and Jennifer Hudson on Bat Out of Hell III

Note: When "Safe Sex" was released as a single, it was released under the title "Safe Sex (When It Comes 2 Loving U)".

== Personnel ==
=== Pandora's Box ===
- Elaine Caswell – vocals
- Ellen Foley – vocals
- Holly Sherwood – vocals
- Gina Taylor – vocals
- Deliria Wilde – vocals
- Jim Steinman – keyboards

=== Band ===
- Eddie Martinez – guitars
- Steve Buslowe – bass guitar
- Tony Levin — bass on "Original Sin (The Natives Are Restless Tonight)"
- Roy Bittan – Grand piano
- Steven Margoshes — piano on "Pray Lewd"
- Jeff Bova – synthesizers, keyboards, programming
- Jimmy Bralower – drums, programming
- Todd Rundgren, Eric Troyer, Rory Dodd, Holly Sherwood, Laura Theodore – backing vocals
- Curtis King, Tawatha Agee, Vaneese Thomas, Brenda King, Darryl Tookes – additional backing vocals
- New York Philharmonic (conducted by Steven Margoshes) — orchestra on "The Opening of the Box"

== 2006 Special Edition re-issue ==
In the slipstream of the release of Meat Loaf's Bat Out of Hell III: The Monster Is Loose, Virgin / EMI released a two disc special edition. The first disc contains the remastered original album, while the second disc is a DVD, containing the two promo videos, and some additional promotional footage.

=== DVD track listing ===
1. "Jim Steinman Opens Pandora's Box" – 18:18
2. "Prologue (A Teenager In Love)" (video) – 0:58
3. "It's All Coming Back to Me Now" (video) – 6:38
4. "Good Girls Go to Heaven (Bad Girls Go Everywhere)" (video) – 6:12

=== DVD credits ===
1. Produced and Directed by Mark Wightwick, Executive Producer: Sue Winter
2. Directed by Ken Russell, produced by Vasconcellos
3. Directed by Ken Russell, produced by Vasconcellos
4. Directed by Brian Grant, produced by Jonathan Cooke

DVD Produced by Abbey Road Interactive

== Charts ==
Chart (1989–90)	Peak position
Australian Albums (ARIA)	127
Swedish Albums (Sverigetopplistan)	43
UK Heavy Metal Albums (Spotlight Research)	4
