= The Dream Engine =

Music performance group

The Dream Engine is the name of a music performance group created by Jim Steinman and Steven Rinkoff, first publicly presented in 2006. They only performed songs written or co-written by Steinman. TDE did live performances, and worked on studio recordings.

The people in this project were the first ever to publicly perform the songs "What Part of My Body Hurts the Most", "We're Still the Children We Once Were", "Speaking in Tongues", "Not Allowed to Love" and "(It Hurts) Only When I Feel". The last of those songs is partly adapted from "If It Ain't Broke (Break It)". This project was also the first to perform a revised and politicized lyric to "Braver Than We Are". With the new lyric, the song has alternatively been called "An American Elegy" and "God's Gone A.W.O.L.".

This project has not performed or been active in public since 2006, aside from having a website (no longer online) and myspace page.

== People involved ==
=== Jim Steinman ===
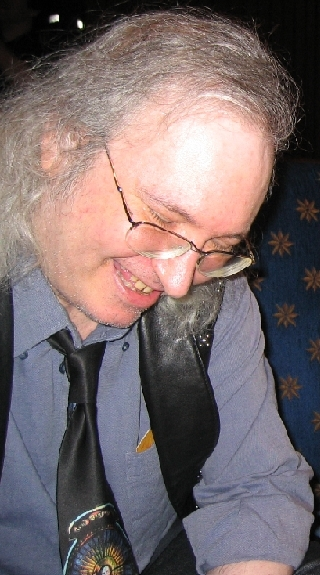
Steinman signing autographs in June 2005 in Uncasville, Connecticut at the Mohegan Sun casino after an Over the Top show.

Jim Steinman was one of the two creators of The Dream Engine. His past work includes composing for the musical Tanz der Vampire, writing lyrics for the musical Whistle Down the Wind, writing all of the music and lyrics on the Meat Loaf albums Bat Out of Hell and Bat Out of Hell II: Back into Hell, and writing and/or producing material sung by such performers as Celine Dion, Bonnie Tyler, Air Supply, Tina Arena, The Sisters of Mercy, Billy Squier and others.

TDE was expected to record only songs that Steinman wrote, or in a small number of cases co-wrote. Steinman was also involved as co-producer of their unreleased recordings.

=== Steven Rinkoff ===
Steven Rinkoff was co-creator of TDE and co-producer of their unreleased recordings. He has worked with Jim Steinman since 1986, on many projects, as an engineer, co-producer and mixer, as well as on many recordings that did not involve Jim Steinman (for artists including Eric Clapton, Paul McCartney, The Bangles and Billy Idol). Rinkoff is Steinman's partner in Ravenous Records, their record label.

In his December 28, 2006, blog entry, Jim Steinman mentioned Rinkoff's primary leadership role with the group. Steinman wrote, "THE DREAM ENGINE, guided by Rinkoff, continues. I know it's better if he communiates (sic) directly with you on that. But Im (sic) sure it will be stunning."

=== Rob Evan ===
Rob Evan is a vocalist and actor. Rob Evan and/or Adrienne Warren sang lead vocals on almost every song that TDE performs. Evan has been in many musical theater productions, including Les Misérables, Little Shop of Horrors, Dance of the Vampires (as a backup for Michael Crawford), Hello, Dolly!, Jesus Christ Superstar, Chess and many others. Most notably, he played the title roles in the original Broadway production of Jekyll & Hyde, continuing for over 600 performances. Evan has also been a featured vocalist for the Trans-Siberian Orchestra.

=== Adrienne Warren ===
Adrienne Warren was a vocalist for TDE. She and/or Rob Evan sang lead vocals on almost every song that TDE performed. Adrienne has also performed for Trans-Siberian Orchestra.

=== Elaine Caswell ===
Elaine Caswell was a vocalist for TDE, doing primarily backup vocals. She has a long history working with Jim Steinman. She was a vocalist on the 1989 album called Original Sin by Pandora's Box. This album was produced by Steinman, with Steven Rinkoff, and contained mostly songs that Steinman wrote. On this album, Caswell performed the very first recording of the song "It's All Coming Back to Me Now", which would later become a hit in 1996 with Celine Dion as the vocalist. Caswell has performed this song with TDE at their live shows. She has sung on television and radio advertisements, as a backup vocalist for television performances, and as a backup vocalist on many music albums.

=== Neal Coomer ===
Neal Coomer was a vocalist for TDE, doing primarily backup vocals. He was a member of the Christian music duo East to West. He also appeared in two musicals called David and The Rock and the Rabbi, both based on the Bible.

=== Steve Margoshes ===
Steve Margoshes played piano at TDE's live performances. He has been verbally credited with the vocal arrangements for these performances. He was credited with piano and vocal arrangements on a demo recording of the song "We're Still the Children We Once Were". This is the recording that appeared on TDE's myspace page beginning in August 2006. Margoshes has collaborated with Jim Steinman since the 1970s, providing orchestrations for many of Steinman's albums and projects, including "Pray Lewd" on the Pandora's Box album Original Sin. He has orchestrated many Broadway musicals, and written original music, including the score for the musical Fame!.

=== Alex Skolnick ===
Alex Skolnick was a guitar player for TDE. He performs with the Alex Skolnick Trio. He has performed with the Trans-Siberian Orchestra, Savatage and Testament, and in touring productions of Jekyll & Hyde.

=== Matt Zebroski ===
Matt Zebroski played drums for TDE. He also performs with the Alex Skolnick Trio.

=== Mat Fieldes ===
Mat Fieldes played bass for TDE. He has a master's degree in music performance from The Juilliard School. He has performed on a wide variety of live performances and recordings, including the Joe Jackson album Symphony, which won the Grammy Award for "Best Pop Instrumental".

=== Adam Ben-David ===
Adam Ben-David played keyboards for TDE, in addition to the performance by Steven Margoshes. He is a keyboardist, conductor and music director who works in the New York City area. He has been active on Broadway since the mid-1990s, and was music director for the rock musical High Fidelity. He was the conductor for the rock musical Spring Awakening in the summer of 2007, and prior to that guest conducted the Four Seasons musical Jersey Boys.

=== Bonnie Tyler ===
Though not featured at every TDE performance, Bonnie Tyler was a special guest at some of the TDE shows at Joe's Pub in New York City in 2006. She performed "Total Eclipse of the Heart" and "Loving You's a Dirty Job but Somebody's Gotta Do It", which was a duet with Rob Evan. Both of those are songs she recorded in the 1980s with Jim Steinman as writer and producer (the second of those songs was recorded with Steven Rinkoff as engineer).

=== Nicki Richards ===
Nicki Richards was a featured singer with this group for some shows, but had left before the March 2006 shows. She has released solo albums, and has been a backup vocalist for many well-known performers.

== Performances ==
=== Early 2006 and Before ===
The first TDE performances were in February 2006, at Joe's Pub in New York City. These were followed by another set of shows in March 2006, at the same location.

In 2005, many of the same people who are involved in TDE (including Rob Evan, Elaine Caswell, Steve Margoshes and others) performed at live shows called Over the Top. These shows were prepared by the same people as TDE's shows, and were similar to the TDE shows in that only songs written or co-written by Jim Steinman were performed. These were held in January 2005 at Joe's Pub in New York City, and then in June 2005 at the Mohegan Sun Casino in Uncasville, Connecticut.

Several of these performance shows, both as Over the Top and as The Dream Engine were bootlegged by fans and circulated on the internet, despite this being forbidden by Steven Rinkoff. Those bootleg recordings are the basis for what is on this Wikipedia page regarding the material performed.

=== September 2006 ===
TDE performed two songs in Atlanta, Georgia on September 16, 2006. They were "What Part of My Body Hurts the Most" followed by "We're Still the Children We Once Were". The four main vocalists were accompanied by Steve Margoshes on piano. This was part of an induction ceremony for the Georgia Music Hall of Fame. Rob Evan has a historical link to this organization, due to having been a recipient of the Georgia Music Hall of Fame Talent Award in 1989. Rob Evan is a native of Monticello, Georgia.

=== Repertoire at Live Performances ===
This is a list of songs TDE has performed at their live shows in 2006: "Is Nothing Sacred", "The Future Ain't What It Used to Be", the instrumental intro called "Great Boleros of Fire", "(It Hurts) Only When I Feel", "Loving You's a Dirty Job But Somebody's Got to Do It", "Safe Sex", "Objects in the Rear View Mirror May Appear Closer than They Are", the revised "Braver Than We Are" (alternate titles have been "An American Elegy" and "God's Gone A.W.O.L."), "It's All Coming Back to Me Now", "Not Allowed to Love", "Total Eclipse of the Heart", "What Part of My Body Hurts the Most", "Two Out of Three Ain't Bad", "We're Still the Children We Once Were", "Angels Arise", "Speaking in Tongues", "For Crying Out Loud".

=== Repertoire for Recording ===
According to their official website, in August 2006 TDE was nearly finished recording and mixing versions of these songs: "What Part of My Body Hurts The Most", "Safe Sex", "We're Still the Children We Once Were", "(It Hurts) Only When I Feel", "Braver Than We Are" and "Is Nothing Sacred".

The same website has said that the following songs have been recorded (perhaps as a demo only) and are at various stages of completion/consideration: "Not Allowed to Love", "In the Land of the Pig the Butcher is King", "Speaking in Tongues", "Confessions", "Seize the Night", "The Future Ain't What It Used to Be" and others.

The website has mentioned in the past that TDE has recorded to some extent the song "Cry to Heaven", as a vocal quartet.

=== Regarding the Release of Recordings ===
In early 2006, the webpage for Steven Rinkoff began to say:

This suggested that The Dream Engine would release a CD in 2006. Since then however TDE has not firmly committed to a release date for a CD, or to whether or not such a thing will be released.
