= Safe Sex (When It Comes 2 Loving U) =

1989 song by Pandora's Box

Single by Pandora's Box

from the album Original Sin
- Released: June 11, 1990
- Length: 4:08 (7" single version); 4:18 (digital version); 4:57 (12" single version); 6:24 (album version)
- Label: Virgin
- Songwriter: Jim Steinman
- Producer: Jim Steinman

Pandora's Box singles chronology
"Good Girls Go to Heaven (Bad Girls Go Everywhere)" (1990)	"Safe Sex (When It Comes 2 Loving U)" (1990)

"Safe Sex", also known as "Safe Sex (When It Comes 2 Loving U)", is a song by American band Pandora's Box, released on June 11, 1990, as the third and final single from their only studio album, Original Sin (1989). The song was written and produced by Jim Steinman.

== Background ==
Speaking of the song in a 1989 interview with Kerrang!, writer and producer Jim Steinman said, "I hate the term 'safe sex'. Sex has never been safe. It's about having the heart, the brain and the body totally exposed, and that's fucking dangerous. The girl in 'Safe Sex' is saying, 'You can't fool me. I don't believe in these absurd little fairy tales about love'."

== Critical reception ==
Upon its release as a single, Ian Gittins of Melody Maker called "Safe Sex" "a song twice the size of America" from the "master of bombast" Steinman and added, "I admire his cheek while baulking at the sheer gross vulgarity of it all. Still, I'm a vulgar sort. I'm all for it!" North Wales Weekly News noted that the single "takes the biscuit for most eye-catching title of the year so far" and added that it's "hard to believe that despite the title this is actually a ballad". Phil Wilding of Kerrang! called it the "swollen condom nation anthem with a gleam in its eye" and Bob Catley of Magnum, as a guest reviewer, considered it "alright" and a song he could see Bonnie Tyler singing. As guest reviewers, Leigh Matty of Romeo's Daughter felt it was "cabaret rock" which "doesn't have any energy", whereas Willie Dowling of the Grip said it was "just pomp" with "nothing to latch on to".

== Track listing ==
7-inch and cassette single (UK)

1. "Safe Sex (When It Comes 2 Loving U)" – 4:08
2. "I've Been Dreaming Up a Storm Lately" – 3:03
3. "Requiem Metal" – 0:50

12-inch single (UK)

1. "Safe Sex (When It Comes 2 Loving U)" – 4:57
2. "Pray Lewd" – 3:38
3. "I've Been Dreaming Up a Storm Lately" – 3:03
4. "Requiem Metal" – 0:50

CD single (UK)

1. "Safe Sex (When It Comes 2 Loving U)" – 4:08
2. "Pray Lewd" – 3:38
3. "Requiem Metal" – 0:50
4. "Safe Sex (When It Comes 2 Loving U)" – 4:57

== Personnel ==
"Safe Sex"

- Gina Taylor – lead vocals
- Jim Steinman – keyboards, arrangement
- Jeff Bova – keyboards, synthesizers, programming, arrangement
- Eddie Martinez – guitars
- Steve Buslowe – bass guitar
- Jim Bralower – drums and programming
- Pandora's Box – arrangement
- Todd Rundgren – backing vocal arrangement
- Eric Troyer – backing vocal arrangement

Production

- Jim Steinman – production (all tracks)
- Larry Alexander – engineering, mixing

Other

- Hills Archer – sleeve

== Charts ==
Chart (1990)	Peak position
UK Heavy Metal Singles (Spotlight Research)	8
