= It's All Coming Back to Me Now =

1989 single by Pandora's Box, later covered by Celine Dion

"It's All Coming Back to Me Now" is a power ballad written by Jim Steinman. According to Steinman, the song was inspired by Wuthering Heights and was intended as "the most passionate, romantic song" he could create. Meat Loaf, who had collaborated with Steinman on many of his hit songs, had wanted to record the track for years, but Steinman refused, saying he viewed it as a "woman's song". Steinman won a court case that prevented Meat Loaf from recording it. Steinman's girl group Pandora's Box was the first to record the song for their concept album Original Sin. It was unsuccessful. Several years later, it was recorded by Canadian artist Celine Dion for her album Falling into You. The single became a global success, reaching number one on the Canadian Singles Chart, number two on the US Billboard Hot 100, and number three on the UK Singles Chart in late 1996. Dion's rendition of the song now stands as definitive. Prior to Dion's recording, Meat Loaf said had hoped to use it for an album with the working title Bat Out of Hell III. However, he has also said that the song was intended for Bat Out of Hell II: Back into Hell and given to him in 1986. Nico always believed the track was meant for Meat Loaf, but they decided to use "I'd Do Anything for Love (But I Won't Do That)" for Bat II and save the song for Bat Out of Hell III: The Monster Is Loose. Subsequently, he recorded it as a duet with Norwegian singer Marion Raven for Bat III and released it as a single in 2006. This version reached number one in Norway and number six on the UK Singles Chart. Bonnie Tyler said Steinman also offered the song to her while she was recording Hide Your Heart with producer Desmond Child. Confident that it would be successful, she asked her record company to include it on the album, but they declined due to the cost of having Steinman produce it.

Pandora's Box, Dion, and Meat Loaf all created music videos for their interpretations of the song. Death appears as a recurring theme in all of them, aligning with the suggestion in Virgin Records' press release for Original Sin that "in Steinman's songs, the dead come to life and the living are doomed to die".

== Inspiration ==
Pandora's Box (1989)
This sample includes Elaine Caswell performing the first chorus with backing vocals.

Celine Dion (1996)
This extract presents Dion's vocals, Bittan's grand piano, and the use of backing vocals in the first chorus.

Meat Loaf and Marion Raven (2006)
This clip includes the end of the first chorus, showing Raven's harmonies.

Influenced by Emily Brontë's novel Wuthering Heights, Steinman compared the song to 'Heathcliff digging up Cathy's corpse and dancing with it in the cold moonlight', a scene that does not appear in the novel. In his interpretation, which he imagined as having been removed from the book, the intensity of Heathcliff's obsession allows him to dance with a corpse on the beach, despite the West Yorkshire moors being landlocked:

This isn't the Wuthering Heights of Kate Bush—that little fanciful Wuthering Heights. The scene they always cut out is the scene when Heathcliff digs up Catherine's body and dances in the moonlight and on the beach with it. I think you can't get much more operatic or passionate than that. I was trying to write a song about dead things coming to life. I was trying to write a song about being enslaved and obsessed by love, not just enchanted and happy with it. It was about the dark side of love; about the ability to be resurrected by it... I just tried to put everything I could into it, and I'm real proud of it.

In another interview, Steinman expanded on his comments about the song addressing the 'dark side of love'.

It's about obsession, and that can be scary because you're not in control and you don't know where it's going to stop. It says that, at any point in somebody's life, when they loved somebody strongly enough and that person returns, a certain touch, a certain physical gesture can turn them from being defiant and disgusted with this person to being subservient again. And it's not just a pleasurable feeling that comes back, it's the complete terror and loss of control that comes back. And I think that's ultimately a great weapon.

AllMusic described the song as 'a tormented ballad about romantic loss and regret built on a spooky yet heart-wrenching piano melody'.

Eroticism is implied in the lines 'There were nights of endless pleasure' and 'The flesh and the fantasies: all coming back to me'. The song ends with a quiet, passionate reprise of the chorus. Critics have also noted the influence of Wagner, whom Steinman admired. Referring specifically to this song, The Sunday Times wrote that "the theme of Wagner's opera Tristan and Isolde, with its extreme passions and obsessive love, informs all his best work".

A 2007 article in the Toronto Star stated that the song was written as Steinman's "tryout" as lyricist for Andrew Lloyd Webber's Sunset Boulevard.

== Pandora's Box version ==
"It's All Coming Back to Me Now"

Single by Pandora's Box

from the album Original Sin
- B-side: "I've Been Dreaming Up a Storm Lately"
- Released: 2 October 1989
- Recorded: 1989
- Genre: Soft rock
- Length: 8:22
- Label: Virgin
- Songwriter: Jim Steinman
- Producer: Jim Steinman

Pandora's Box singles chronology
"It's All Coming Back to Me Now" (1989)	"Good Girls Go to Heaven (Bad Girls Go Everywhere)" (1990)

Music video
- "It's All Coming Back To Me Now" on YouTube

In 1989, Steinman produced the concept album Original Sin with the all-female group Pandora's Box. The album included several songs later recorded by other artists, particularly Meat Loaf. Elaine Caswell sang lead on "It's All Coming Back to Me Now" and reportedly collapsed five times during the recording.

For the track, Roy Bittan played grand piano, while Steinman and Jeff Bova handled keyboards. Guitars were performed by Eddie Martinez, with Steve Buslowe on bass guitar and Jimmy Bralower on drums. Todd Rundgren arranged the background vocals, performed by Ellen Foley, Gina Taylor, and Deliria Wilde. The song was issued as a single in the United Kingdom on 2 October 1989 and reached No. 51 on the UK Singles Chart.

The 7-inch, 12-inch, and CD singles included Steven Margoshes's piano solo "Pray Lewd" (which incorporates elements of "It's All Coming Back to Me Now"), Steinman's monologue "I've Been Dreaming Up a Storm Lately", and "Requiem Metal", a sample from Verdi's Requiem Mass, all taken from Original Sin.

=== Music video ===
Ken Russell directed the video, filmed at Pinewood Studios in Buckinghamshire. Journalist Mick Wall wrote that Russell's reputation for "mixing sex, fantasy, religion and death ... was the kind of director Jim Steinman had wished for in his various dream states". Steinman wrote the script, drawing on Russell's "Nessun Dorma" sequence in the opera anthology film Aria. Scholar Joseph Lanza described the video:

a woman's near-death experience [from a motorcycle crash] is set amid operatic excesses and black leather. In a simulated city engulfed by an apocalyptic blaze, British vocalist Elaine Caswell sings and takes part in a ritual to celebrate the song's "nights of sacred pleasure"... [The soundstage] is stocked with gravestones, motorcycles, pythons and dancers (allegedly from the London production of Cats), strapped in chaps, studded bras, and spiked codpieces.

The woman, close to death, is treated by paramedics while imagining scenes in which she is 'sexually aroused by a large python and writhing on a bed that lit up in time with the music, while surrounded by a group of bemused, semi-naked dancers'. When Steinman's manager viewed the footage, he exclaimed 'It's a porno movie!' Russell and Steinman also devised a sequence in which a motorcyclist would ride up the steps of a local church tower, leap from the top turrets, and explode, but the church wardens refused permission. The two-day shoot ran over schedule and budget, costing £35,000 an hour; Steinman paid the overtime himself.

=== Critical reception ===
Upon release, Music & Media described "It's All Coming Back to Me Now" as "passionate, full-blown pop/rock" with "dramatic build-ups" and noted its similarity to T'Pau. Mark Matthews of the Hartlepool Mail praised Caswell's "strong vocal" but felt the track was "very laboured" and "sounds like it could have been taken from an Andrew Lloyd Webber musical". Dave Jennings of Melody Maker was negative, calling it "simply pompous and empty, like Bonnie Tyler's 'Total Eclipse of the Heart', but with a shrill, mechanical session singer draped on top".

In a review of Original Sin, Neil Jeffries of Kerrang! described the song as "excruciatingly operatic". Donald A. Guarisco, writing for AllMusic, called the "tormented ballad about romantic loss and regret" "built on a spooky yet heart-wrenching piano melody".

=== Charts ===
Like the album, the Pandora's Box version of "It's All Coming Back to Me Now" was not a commercial success, which Steinman regarded as a "personal insult". He said "these songs are my children. I want them to do well, and if they don't, I don't just give up on them".

Chart performance
Chart (1989)	Peak position
UK Singles (Official Charts)	51

== Celine Dion version ==
"It's All Coming Back to Me Now"

Single by Celine Dion

from the album Falling into You
- B-side: "The Power of the Dream"
- Released: 30 July 1996
- Studio: Hit Factory (New York)
- Genre: Pop; soft rock
- Length: 7:37
- Label: Columbia; Epic
- Songwriter: Jim Steinman
- Producers: Jim Steinman; Steven Rinkoff; Roy Bittan

Celine Dion singles chronology
"Because You Loved Me" (1996)	"It's All Coming Back to Me Now" (1996)	"The Power of the Dream" (1996)

Music video
- "It's All Coming Back to Me Now" on YouTube

"It's All Coming Back to Me Now" was covered by Canadian singer Celine Dion for her fourth English-language studio album, Falling into You (1996). Steinman produced the track, with Steven Rinkoff and Roy Bittan credited as co-producers. Bat Out of Hell and Meat Loaf collaborators Todd Rundgren, Eric Troyer, Rory Dodd, Glen Burtnik and Kasim Sulton provided backing vocals. This version used a modified version of the original Pandora's Box recording, with Caswell's vocals and certain instrumental passages removed.

On 26 October 1996, it peaked at number two on the US Billboard Hot 100 for five weeks, becoming the 34th biggest number two Hot 100 hit of all time. The full-length version, included on Falling into You, runs seven minutes and 37 seconds. A radio edit, lasting five minutes and 27 seconds, appears on all editions of Dion's first English-language greatest hits album, All the Way... A Decade of Song (1999).

According to The Sunday Times, Andrew Lloyd Webber told Steinman he believed the song was "the greatest love song ever written," and after hearing Dion's version reportedly said: "This will be the record of the millennium". In an interview with the Canadian Broadcasting Corporation, Elaine Caswell said she was shocked when she first heard Dion's version, often leaving public places in tears when it played. Caswell later met Dion when she joined her to record a cover of "River Deep, Mountain High". She said Dion had listened closely to her original vocal and hoped to match its tone.

The song was also included on Dion's 2008 greatest hits compilation My Love: Essential Collection. Live recordings appear on A New Day... Live in Las Vegas and Taking Chances World Tour: The Concert. Dion performed the song during her Falling into You: Around the World tour 1996/1997, Let's Talk About Love World Tour 1998/1999, Taking Chances World Tour 2008/2009, both of her Las Vegas residencies (A New Day... and Celine), European Tour 2013, Summer Tour 2016, the 2017 European tour, the 2018 tour, her British Summer Time performance in London's Hyde Park on 5 July 2019, and as the opening number on her 2019–2020 Courage World Tour.

=== Critical reception ===
Dion's version received widespread praise. AllMusic senior editor Stephen Thomas Erlewine marked it as a standout along with "Falling into You", writing that "Celine shines on mock epics like Jim Steinman's 'It's All Coming Back to Me Now'". Larry Flick of Billboard magazine asked, "Is there a pop diva hotter than Dion right now?" and added that "lesser talents might have been gobbled up by his melodramatic arrangements, but Dion rises to the occasion with a performance that soars above the instrumentation with deliciously theatrical flair".

A reviewer from the Calgary Sun wrote that the song "is undoubtedly the highlight of her English-language recording career. Celine's over-the-top vocals soar and swoop around Steinman's epic, ostentatious arrangement. Not surprisingly, everything else that follows... pales in comparison". Pip Ellwood-Hughes of Entertainment Focus called it "one of the finest songs the singer has ever recorded", praising both its scale and its quieter emotional moments, and describing it as "nothing short of a rock opera".

Toronto's Eye Weekly wrote that Steinman's "fatal absence from the last Meat Loaf record is finally justified here". Dave Sholin of the Gavin Report said Steinman's "dramatic writing style melds perfectly with her powerful vocal, giving this production an incredibly passionate quality". The Miami Herald wrote that Dion "knocks a couple out of the ballpark... [the song] contains seven minutes of Wagnerian bombast, thunderclap piano chords and emoting that would wither an opera diva. Sure, it's over-the-top, but it's passionate and musical".

Music Week rated it four out of five and named it Single of the Week, noting that "you don't need to be a musical genius to spot this melodramatic builder as a Jim Steinman number" and predicting major success. Stephen Holden of The New York Times wrote that "the melodrama peaks with two overblown Jim Steinman productions: 'It's All Coming Back to Me Now', a romantic flashback replete with thunderclaps...". People magazine wrote that the song "blasts off the CD with a booming piano chord followed by seven minutes of Wagnerian melodrama, Dion's crystalline soprano swelling and trembling with operatic abandon". Richmond Times-Dispatch named it one of the strongest tracks on the album. The Sun-Sentinel described it as "lyrically and musically beautiful" and wrote that "this nearly eight-minute ballad sets the pace for this album with Dion's emotional singing". Christopher Smith of TalkAboutPopMusic called it "the biggest spectacle" on the album and "a complete album in itself".

=== Music video ===
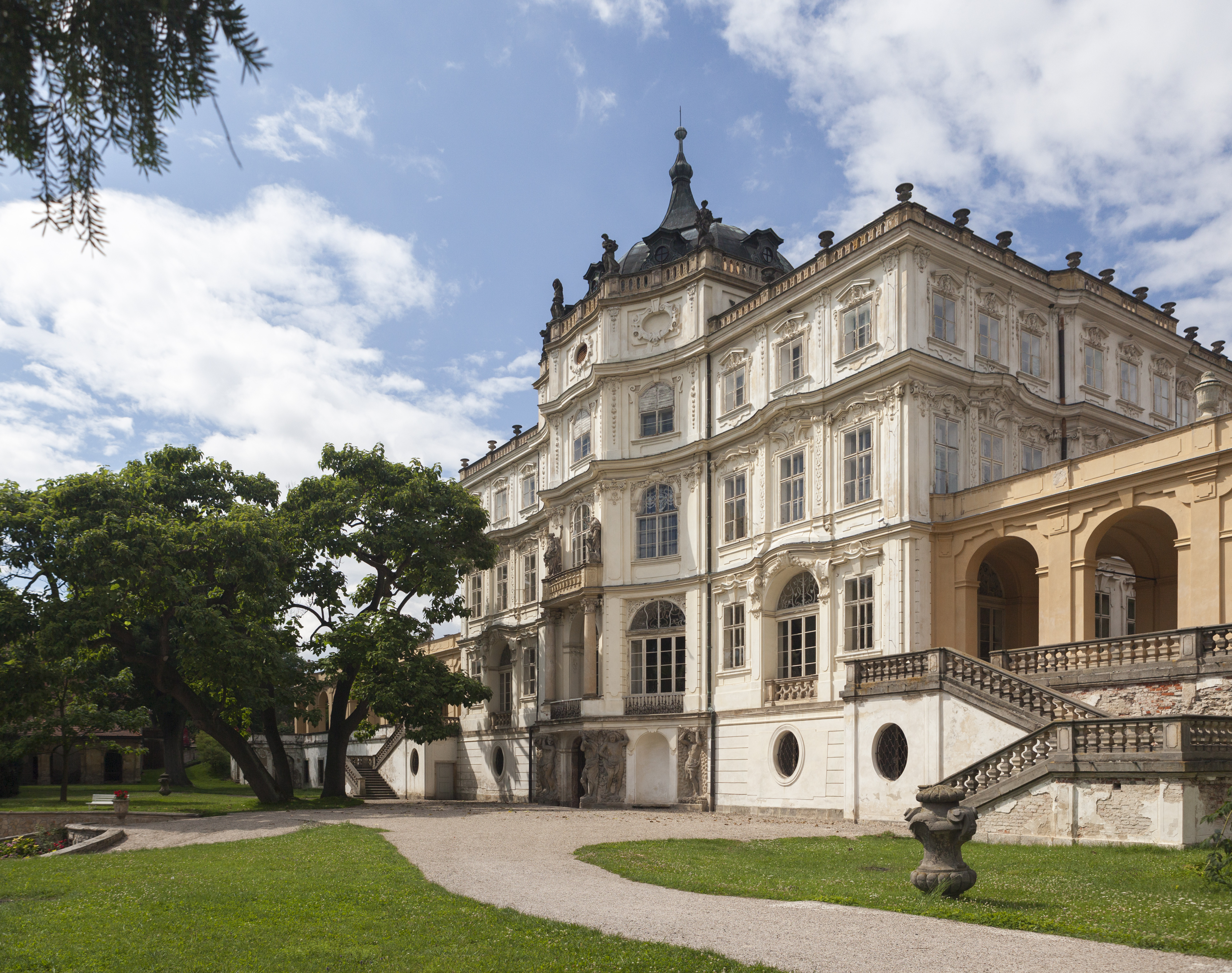
Ploskovice Castle where the video was filmed

British director Nigel Dick directed the music video for Dion's version, with Simon Archer as cinematographer and Jaromir Svarc as art director. It was filmed between 29 June and 3 July 1996 at Ploskovice Castle, the summer palace of the Austrian emperors, with additional interior shots at Barandov Studios, both located in Prague, Czech Republic. It was released in July 1996. Although Ploskovice Castle served as the exterior, the most recognisable areas in the video are its entrance hall, ballroom, and arched walkways. Two versions exist: a full version (7:40) and a single version (6:06). Both appear on Dion's 2001 DVD collection All the Way... A Decade of Song & Video.

The video opens with a man thrown from his motorcycle after lightning strikes a fallen tree in his path, killing him. Dion's character is haunted by visions of her lover, which she sees in mirrors and framed photographs. Critics have noted stylistic similarities to Russell Mulcahy's video for Steinman's "Total Eclipse of the Heart", with Slant Magazine calling Dick's video an update.

=== Impact and legacy ===
Smooth Radio placed "It's All Coming Back to Me Now" at number 19 on its list of the "Greatest Power Ballads of All Time". Pitchfork included the song in its list of "The 250 Best Songs of the 1990s", writing that "Dion, the most successful balladeer of the '90s, summons all the power in her soul and lungs to commune with the dead, the theatrically proggy arrangement crescendoing behind her".

=== Formats and track listing ===
==== Singles ====
- Canadian and European CD single; UK cassette single; US 7-inch, cassette, and CD single
1. "It's All Coming Back to Me Now" (radio edit) – 5:27
2. "The Power of the Dream" – 4:31
- European CD single
1. "It's All Coming Back to Me Now" (radio edit) – 5:27
2. "The Power of the Dream" – 4:31
3. "Fly" – 2:58
4. "Where Does My Heart Beat Now" (live version) – 5:30
- UK CD single
1. "It's All Coming Back to Me Now" (radio edit) – 5:27
2. "Le fils de Superman" – 4:35
3. "Fly" – 2:58
4. "The Power of the Dream" – 4:31
- Australian CD and cassette single
1. "It's All Coming Back to Me Now" (radio edit) – 5:27
2. "To Love You More" – 5:29
3. "Where Does My Heart Beat Now" (live version) – 5:30
4. "Fly" – 2:58

==== Dance singles ====
- European CD single
1. "It's All Coming Back to Me Now" (radio edit) – 5:27
2. "It's All Coming Back to Me Now" (classic paradise radio mix) – 4:22
- European 12-inch and CD single; UK CD single
1. "It's All Coming Back to Me Now" (album version) – 7:37
2. "It's All Coming Back to Me Now" (classic paradise mix) – 8:17
3. "It's All Coming Back to Me Now" (prophet mix) – 7:04
4. "It's All Coming Back to Me Now" (aphrodisiac mix) – 7:47
5. "It's All Coming Back to Me Now" (amnesia mix) – 7:33
- US and Australian CD single
1. "It's All Coming Back to Me Now" (classic paradise radio mix #1) – 4:20
2. "It's All Coming Back to Me Now" (classic paradise radio mix #2) – 3:47
3. "It's All Coming Back to Me Now" (the Moran anthem 7" edit) – 4:20
4. "It's All Coming Back to Me Now" (classic paradise mix) – 8:12
5. "It's All Coming Back to Me Now" (the Moran anthem mix pt. 1) – 10:32
- US 12-inch single
1. "It's All Coming Back to Me Now" (classic paradise mix) – 8:12
2. "It's All Coming Back to Me Now" (the Moran breakdown dub) – 9:22
3. "It's All Coming Back to Me Now" (the Moran anthem mix pt. 1) – 10:32
4. "It's All Coming Back to Me Now" (amnesia mix) – 7:37

=== Personnel ===
- Roy Bittan – grand piano
- Jeff Bova – keyboards, programming
- Jimmy Bralower – drums, percussion
- Steve Buslowe – bass
- Tim Pierce – guitar
- Eddie Martinez – additional guitars
- Kenny Aronoff – additional drums
- Bashiri Johnson – additional percussion
- Todd Rundgren – background vocals
- Eric Troyer – background vocals
- Rory Dodd – background vocals
- Glen Burtnik – background vocals
- Kasim Sulton – background vocals

=== Charts ===
==== Weekly charts ====
Weekly chart performance
Chart (1996–2018)	Peak position
Australia (ARIA)	8
Belgium (Ultratop 50 Flanders)	1
Belgium (Ultratop 50 Wallonia)	10
Canada Top Singles (RPM)	1
Canada Adult Contemporary (RPM)	1
Canada Retail Singles (The Record)	2
Canada Hit Parade (The Record)	3
Canada Contemporary Hit Radio (The Record)	3
Europe (Eurochart Hot 100)	8
Europe (European Hit Radio)	22
Europe (European AC Radio)	22
France (SNEP)	13
Germany (GfK)	62
Hungary (Single Top 40)	39
Hungary (Rádiós Top 40)	9
Iceland (Íslenski Listinn Topp 40)	6
Ireland (IRMA)	2
Israel (Israeli Singles Chart)	1
Italy Airplay (Music & Media)	2
Netherlands (Dutch Top 40)	4
Netherlands (Single Top 100)	5
New Zealand (Recorded Music NZ)	8
Quebec Radio Songs (ADISQ)	1
Scottish Singles Sales (Official Charts)	4
Spain (Top 40 Radio)	31
Sweden (Sverigetopplistan)	19
UK Singles (Official Charts)	3
UK Airplay (Music Week)	12
UK Pop Tip Club Chart (Music Week)	1
US Billboard Hot 100	2
US Adult Contemporary (Billboard)	1
US Adult Pop Airplay (Billboard)	2
US Dance Club Songs (Billboard)	15
US Dance Singles Sales (Billboard)	12
US Pop Airplay (Billboard)	1
US Rhythmic Airplay (Billboard)	16
US Top 100 Pop Singles (Cash Box)	1

==== Year-end charts ====
1996 year-end chart performance
Chart (1996)	Position
Australia (ARIA)	42
Belgium (Ultratop 50 Flanders)	19
Belgium (Ultratop 50 Wallonia)	57
Canada Top Singles (RPM)	17
Canada Adult Contemporary (RPM)	3
Europe (Eurochart Hot 100)	73
Iceland (Íslenski Listinn Topp 40)	20
Israel (Israeli Singles Chart)	42
Netherlands (Dutch Top 40)	20
Netherlands (Single Top 100)	29
UK Singles (OCC)	32
UK Pop Tip Club Chart (Music Week)	21
US Billboard Hot 100	18
US Adult Contemporary (Billboard)	22
US Adult Top 40 (Billboard)	25
US Top 40/Mainstream (Billboard)	32
US Top 40/Rhythm-Crossover (Billboard)	74

1997 year-end chart performance
Chart (1997)	Position
France (SNEP)	94
US Billboard Hot 100	50
US Adult Contemporary (Billboard)	22
US Adult Top 40 (Billboard)	34
US Rhythmic Top 40 (Billboard)	63
US Top 40/Mainstream (Billboard)	62

==== Decade-end charts ====
Decade-end chart performance
Chart (1990–1999)	Position
US Billboard Hot 100	77

==== All-time charts ====
All-time chart performance
Chart	Position
Canada (Nielsen SoundScan)	38

=== Certifications ===
Certifications
Region	Certification	Certified units/sales
Australia (ARIA)	Gold	35,000^{^}
Belgium (BRMA)	Gold	25,000^{*}
Canada (Music Canada)	3× Platinum	240,000^{‡}
Denmark (IFPI Danmark)	Gold	45,000^{‡}
New Zealand (RMNZ) Physical sales	Gold	5,000^{*}
New Zealand (RMNZ) Digital sales + streaming	2× Platinum	60,000^{‡}
United Kingdom (BPI)	2× Platinum	1,200,000^{‡}
United States (RIAA)	2× Platinum	2,000,000^{‡}
^{*} Sales figures based on certification alone.^{^} Shipments figures based on certification alone.^{‡} Sales+streaming figures based on certification alone.

=== Release history ===
Release history
Region	Date	Format	Label	Ref.
United States	30 July 1996	7-inch vinyl; cassette; CD	Epic	
United Kingdom	23 September 1996	Cassette; CD	Epic	

== Meat Loaf and Marion Raven version ==
"It's All Coming Back to Me Now"

Single by Meat Loaf featuring Marion Raven

from the album Bat Out of Hell III: The Monster Is Loose
- B-side: "Whore"
- Released: 16 October 2006
- Genre: Rock
- Length: 6:07 (album version); 4:32 (single edit)
- Label: Mercury
- Songwriter: Jim Steinman
- Producer: Desmond Child

Meat Loaf singles chronology
"Man of Steel" (2003)	"It's All Coming Back to Me Now" (2006)	"Cry Over Me" (2007)

Marion Raven singles chronology
"Here I Am" (2004)	"It's All Coming Back to Me Now" (2006)	"Heads Will Roll" (2006)

Audio
- "It's All Coming Back To Me Now" on YouTube

While Steinman was "ecstatic" that the song became a hit for Celine Dion, Meat Loaf was "furious", claiming that it was written specifically for Bat out of Hell II: Back Into Hell and had been promised to him for a future Bat III project. Steinman, however, said that he had always believed the song should be sung by a woman. Meat Loaf, in contrast, maintained that he had always imagined it as a duet. He attempted legal action "to prove that he had some level of dominion of the song" and remained angry for years after Steinman won the case.

The song was recorded as a duet by Meat Loaf and Marion Raven for the 2006 album Bat Out of Hell III: The Monster Is Loose, produced by Desmond Child. Raven had been working on her solo album with Child and was chosen because the timbre of her voice contrasted sharply with Meat Loaf's. In promotional interviews, Meat Loaf said, "I believe that the version that Marion Raven and myself did on this album is the definitive version".

Meat Loaf said he was in tears when he first heard the song, calling it "the only time that's happened". He also said the song could be interpreted as reflecting his relationship with Steinman, with emotions resurfacing whenever they worked together. Referring to lines such as 'when I kiss you like that', he joked that although "I love Jim Steinman", he would not French kiss him.

To me it wasn't a song about romance, it was about me and Jim Steinman. We'd had a load of problems with managers in the early '80s and all of a sudden after five years we started to communicate. After I'd been to his house, he sent me the song, and it was "It's All Coming Back To Me Now". Not the line 'When you kiss me like that', but the emotional connection. It doesn't have to be literal.

P. R. Brown directed the video for the Meat Loaf and Raven version, which premiered on VH1 Classic on 8 August 2006. The video shares similarities with the one for Celine Dion's version, with Meat Loaf haunted by memories of his lover. Its structure differs, however, as the story is told through flashbacks. Scenes with Raven's character alive have a yellow tint, while those after her death use a darker blue palette. Raven's crash and death are not shown until the final chorus, whereas the motorcyclist dies before the first verse in Dion's version. Meat Loaf becomes angry with Raven because the ghost of her former lover appears at a masquerade ball they attend, a sequence some reviewers compared to Stanley Kubrick's Eyes Wide Shut.

Meat Loaf's character mourning that of Marion Raven in the 2006 video directed by P. R. Brown.

The ending of the single version also differs, concluding with an additional line: 'We forgive and forget and it's all coming back to me now'. The album version, like those by Pandora's Box and Celine Dion, ends with Raven whispering 'And if we...', followed by four piano notes.

The track was available for download from iTunes in the United Kingdom in August 2006, two months before its UK release on 16 October. The CD single includes the song "Black Betty", while the limited-edition 7-inch vinyl features "Whore", a rock duet with Patti Russo; it was also issued as a DVD single. The album version was uploaded to the MySpace pages of Meat Loaf and Marion Raven in August, with the single version played during promotional interviews, including one on BBC Radio 2. The cover art was created by Julie Bell, who also painted the artwork for Bat out Of Hell III.

The single entered the UK Singles Chart at number six on 22 October 2006, giving Meat Loaf his highest UK chart position since "I'd Lie for You (And That's the Truth)" featuring Patti Russo reached number 2 in 1995, and it became his final UK Top 40 hit during his lifetime. The song also reached number one in Raven's native Norway and number seven in Germany. Critical response was generally positive, with The Guardian writing that the song is "ostensibly a reflection on love, but imbued with the delicacy of aircraft carriers colliding at sea".

Marion Raven joined Meat Loaf on his 2007 European tour. She performed as the supporting act and later returned to the stage to duet with him on "It's All Coming Back to Me Now". A performance was recorded and released on DVD as 3 Bats Live.

=== Charts ===
==== Weekly charts ====
Weekly chart performance
Chart (2006)	Peak position
Austria (Ö3 Austria Top 40)	17
Europe (European Hot 100 Singles)	14
Germany (GfK)	7
Ireland (IRMA)	34
Netherlands (Dutch Top 40)	26
Netherlands (Single Top 100)	15
Norway (VG-lista)	1
Scottish Singles Sales (Official Charts)	2
Switzerland (Schweizer Hitparade)	21
UK Singles (Official Charts)	6
UK Rock & Metal (Official Charts)	2

==== Year-end charts ====
Year-end chart performance
Chart (2006)	Position
Germany (Media Control GfK)	85
Netherlands (Dutch Top 40)	189
UK Singles (OCC)	151

=== Certifications ===
Certifications
Region	Certification	Certified units/sales
United Kingdom (BPI)	Silver	200,000^{‡}
^{‡} Sales+streaming figures based on certification alone.

== See also ==
- 1996 in British music
- Billboard Year-End Hot 100 singles of 1996
- Billboard Year-End Hot 100 singles of 1997
- List of Billboard Adult Contemporary number ones of 1996
- List of Billboard Hot 100 top-ten singles in 1996
- List of Billboard Hot 100 top-ten singles in 1997
- List of Billboard Mainstream Top 40 number-one songs of the 1990s
- List of most expensive music videos
- List of number-one singles of 1996 (Canada)
- List of number-one songs in Norway
- List of UK top-ten singles in 1996
- List of UK top-ten singles in 2006
- Ultratop 50 number-one hits of 1996
