= Steven Rinkoff =

American music producer and sound engineer

Steven Rinkoff is an American Grammy Award–winning record producer, mixer, and sound engineer, best known for his work with songwriter-producer Jim Steinman. He worked with Steinman from 1986 on various projects, in all facets of production (production, mixing, and engineering), and was Steinman's partner in Ravenous Records, a record label.

== Projects ==
=== Jim Steinman ===
- Bonnie Tyler, Secret Dreams and Forbidden Fire, 1986, CBS (engineer)
- The Sisters of Mercy, "More", Vision Thing, 1990, Elektra (engineer/mixer)
- Meat Loaf, Bat Out of Hell II: Back into Hell, 1993, Virgin (engineer/mixer/associate producer)
- Taylor Dayne, "Original Sin", The Shadow, 1994, Universal (recorded/co-producer)
- Watershed, Twister, 1995, Epic (producer)
- Take That, "Never Forget", Greatest Hits, 1995, RCA (recorded/co-producer)
- Bonnie Tyler, "Two Out of Three Ain't Bad" and "Making Love Out of Nothing at All", Free Spirit, 1995, EastWest (co-producer/engineer/mixer)
- Celine Dion, "It's All Coming Back to Me Now", "River Deep, Mountain High" and "Call the Man", Falling into You, 1996, Columbia (co-producer/engineer)
- Tina Arena, In Deep, 1997, Sony (producer/engineer)
- Whistle Down the Wind, cast recording of Andrew Lloyd Webber theatrical production, 1998, Uni/Decca (co-producer/engineer)
- Boyzone, Where We Belong, 1998, Polydor (mixer)
- Boyzone, "No Matter What", 1998, Polydor UK (mixer)
- Meat Loaf, The Very Best of Meat Loaf, 1998, Virgin/Sony (co-producer/engineer/mixer)
- Tanz der Vampire, theatre cast album, 1998, Polygram (co-producer/engineer)
- Marc Anthony and Tina Arena, "I Want to Spend My Lifetime Loving You", The Mask of Zorro, 1998, Sony (co-producer/engineer)
- Celine Dion, All the Way... A Decade of Song, 1999, Columbia/Epic (producer/engineer)
- Various Artists, All Time Greatest Movie Songs, 1999, Sony (producer)
- Luciano Pavarotti and Friends, Pavarotti & Friends: For Guatemala and Kosovo, 1999, Polygram (mixer)
- Boyzone, Singles Collection: 1994-1999, 2000, Polydor (mixing)
- Nicki French, "Two Out of Three Ain't Bad" and "Lovers Again", 2000, Ravenous (mixer)
- Tina Arena, Souvenirs, 2001, Sony (producer/engineer)
- Various Artists, Now and Forever: The Andrew Lloyd Webber Box Set, 2001, Polydor (producer)
- Various Artists, Andrew Lloyd Webber Definitive Hit Singles Collection, 2001, Polydor (mixer) (later reissued in 2002 as "Gold" collection)
- Opera Babes, "Aida", 2002, Sony UK (co-producer/engineer/mixer)
- Wuthering Heights, 2003, Ravenous/MTV Movies (recorded/co-producer)
- The Dream Engine, 2003–2007, Ravenous Group LLC (producer)
- Bonnie Tyler, Faster Than the Speed of Night / Secret Dreams and Forbidden Fire (double-pack), 2004, Columbia (engineer)
- The Sisters of Mercy, Merciful Release, 2007, Merciful Release (overdubs/mixer)
- Celine Dion, Falling into You / A New Day Has Come / Let's Talk About Love (three-pack), 2008, Sony (producer/engineer)
- Celine Dion, My Love: Essential Collection, 2008, Columbia/Epic (producer/engineer)
- "Tanz der Vampire": Neue Wiener Fassung, theatre cast album, 2009, Hit Squad (producer/recorder/mixer)
- Dans der Vampieren, theatre cast album, 2010, MVV (producer)
- Bat Out of Hell The Musical, Original Cast Recording, 2017, BOOH Label (producer)

=== Other ===
- Kid Creole and the Coconuts, Doppelganger, 1983, Ze (engineer)
- Billy Idol, Rebel Yell, 1983, Chrysalis (engineer)
- Marcus Miller, Marcus Miller, 1984, Warner Bros. (assistant)
- The Power Station, The Power Station, 1985, Parlophone/EMI/Capitol (engineer)
- Al Jarreau, Live in London, 1985, Warner Bros. (engineer)
- Robert Palmer, Riptide, 1985, Island (engineer)
- Paul McCartney, Press to Play, 1986, Parlophone/EMI/Capitol (engineer/mixer)
- Steve Winwood, Back in the High Life, 1986, Island (engineer)
- Tina Turner, Break Every Rule, 1986, Capitol (engineer)
- Journey, Raised on Radio, 1986, Columbia (engineer)
- Lone Justice, Shelter, 1986, Geffen (engineer)
- The Jitters, The Jitters, 1987, Capitol/Canada (engineer/mixer)
- Little Steven, Freedom - No Compromise, 1987, Manhattan (engineer)
- Warlock, Triumph and Agony, 1987, Vertigo/Polygram (mixer)
- The Brandos, Honor Among Thieves, 1987, Relativity (mixer)
- They Eat Their Own, "Video Martyr", They Eat Their Own, 1987, Relativity (mixer)
- Motörhead, "On the Road", 1980's, GWR (mixer)
- Platinum Blonde, Contact, 1987, CBS/Canada (mixer)
- 4 Reasons Unknown, 4 Reasons Unknown, 1988, Epic (engineer)
- Til Tuesday, Everything's Different Now, 1988, Epic (engineer)
- Married to the Mob, 1988, Orion Pictures (music production)
- The Feelies, Only Life, 1988, A&M (producer/engineer)
- The Fat Boys, "Are You Ready For Freddy", A Nightmare on Elm Street 4: The Dream Master, 1988, Tin Pan Apple (mixer)
- Rod Stewart, "Lost in You" (12" version), Out of Order, 1988, Warner Brothers (mixer)
- The Bangles, "I'll Set You Free," Everything, 1988, Columbia (engineer)
- Face to Face, One Big Day, 1988, Polygram (engineer/mixer)
- John Zorn, Spy vs Spy: The Music of Ornette Coleman, 1988, Elektra/Musician (engineer)
- Joe Henry, Murder of Crows, 1989, Coyote/A&M (mixer)
- Paul McCartney, Flowers in the Dirt, 1989, Parlophone/EMI/Capitol (engineer)
- The Grapes of Wrath, Now and Again, 1989, Capitol/Canada (mixer)
- Phoebe Snow, Something Real, 1989, Elektra (engineer/mixer)
- George Benson, Tenderly, 1989, Warner Bros. (engineer)
- The Golden Palominos, A Dead Horse, 1989, Celluloid (engineer/mixer)
- Tom Cochrane and Red Rider, The Symphony Sessions, 1989, LP/Capitol (producer/mixer)
- Jodi Bongiovi, Jodi Bongiovi, 1989, Capitol (engineer/mixer)
- Eric Clapton, Journeyman, 1989, Reprise (engineer)
- Luba, All or Nothing, 1989, Capitol/Canada (mixer)
- The Brandos, Trial By Fire, 1990, BMG (engineer/mixer)
- Regatta, Regatta, 1990, BMG/Canada (engineer/mixer)
- The Bangles, Greatest Hits, 1990, Sony/Columbia (engineer)
- Derek and the Dominos, The Layla Sessions: 20th Anniversary Edition, 1990, Polygram (mixer)
- Simon Shaheen, The Music of Mohamed Abdel Wahab, 1990, Axiom (engineer)
- Various Artists, Illuminations: An Axiom Compilation, 1991, Axiom (engineer)
- Belinda Carlisle, Live Your Life Be Free, 1991, MCA/Virgin (engineer)
- N Motion, N/Motion, 1991, Warner Bros. (mixer)
- Too Much Joy, Cereal Killers, 1991, Giant/Warner Bros. Records (engineer)
- Squeeze, Play, 1991, Warner Bros. (engineer)
- The Brandos, "The Solution," Gunfire At Midnight, 1992, SPV (mixer)
- The Golden Palominos, History (1982-1985), 1992, Enigma/Restless (engineer/mixer)
- Gregg Alexander, Intoxifornication, 1992, Epic/Sony (producer/engineer)
- Helix, Back for Another Taste, 1993, Castle (engineer/mixer)
- The Feelies, "Higher Ground" (single), 1993, A&M (producer)
- The Velvet Underground, What Goes On, 1993, Raven (engineer)
- Axiom Funk, Funkcronomicon, 1995, Axiom (engineer)
- Phish, A Live One, 1995, Elektra (technical consultant)
- Various Artists, New Hits '96, 1996, Alex (engineer/assoc. producer)
- Eric Clapton, Blues, 1999, Polygram (mixer)
- George Benson, George Benson Anthology, 2000, Rhino (engineer)
- Belinda Carlisle, Original Gold, 2000, Disky (engineer)
- Alex Skolnick Trio, Last Day in Paradise, 2007, Magnatude (mixer)
- Mick Jagger, The Very Best of Mick Jagger, 2007, Atlantic/Rhino (engineer)
