= Ravenous Records =

American record label

Ravenous Records, a division of Ravenous Entertainment, was formed in 1998 by Jim Steinman and Steven Rinkoff. Rinkoff best explained the purpose of the label (and how it went wrong) in a May 2005 interview with BroadwayWorld.com, "Jim and I have a label called Ravenous Records where initially the idea was just to find great singers for Jim's songs, and as hard as that could be, we somehow got skewed into finding people that were writing their own songs, and then we became a label where we were putting out artists that had nothing to do with Jim's music."

Nicki French was signed to the label in 2000, during which time she recorded two tracks "Lovers Again" (a cover of a Bonnie Tyler track) and "Two Out Of Three Ain't Bad" (Meat Loaf cover), both of which never got released commercially.

Currently, the label is inactive, and is owned by Sony Music Entertainment.

== Roster ==
- Hewitt Huntwork
- Boyzone
- Nicki French
- The Dream Engine

== Discography ==
=== Singles ===
- Boyzone, "No Matter What" (Steinman/Lloyd Webber) - August 1998; also featured "Where Have You Been," Phil da Costa's Oxygen Edit of "All That I Need," "She's The One" and a live interview #1 in 18 countries, over five million singles sold
- Boyzone, "All The Time In The World" - 5 October 1998

=== Albums ===
- Boyzone, Where We Belong - 17 November 1998
- Wuthering Heights (original soundtrack) -- co-released by the MTV Original Movies label in November 2003; track list: "Prelude: The Future Ain't What It Used To Be" (Steinman), "More" (Eldritch/Steinman), "I Will Crumble" (Huntwork), "If It Ain't Broke (Break It)" (Steinman), "Shine" (Huntwork), "The Future Ain't What It Used To Be" (Steinman)

=== Unreleased ===
- Nicki French "Two Out Of Three Ain't Bad," "Lovers Again"
