= Rory Dodd =

Canadian singer

- Born: 1954 (age 71–72); Port Dover, Ontario, Canada
- Genres: Rock; Pop rock; Power pop
- Occupation: Singer
- Instrument: Vocals
- Years active: 1976–present
- Labels: CBS; Columbia

Rory Dodd (born 1954) is a Canadian rock vocalist who has performed many songs written by Jim Steinman. He is known for singing as the duet voice (the "Turn around, bright eyes" lyrics) on Bonnie Tyler's song "Total Eclipse of the Heart", a number 1 hit on the Billboard Hot 100.

== Early life ==
Dodd was born in Port Dover, Ontario to Irish parents. His mother, Maureen, was a music teacher, who had a foundation opened and named after her when she passed away.

He is the younger brother of voice actor and singer Cal Dodd. He started singing at the age of four, when he and his brother would sing Irish folk songs.

== Career ==
Dodd performed the backing vocals for many of Meat Loaf's songs. He also sang three songs on Steinman's solo album Bad for Good (although he is only credited for two of them on the sleeve notes of the LP pressing). "Rock and Roll Dreams Come Through", was his biggest hit as a lead singer, reaching Number 32 on the Billboard Hot 100. Dodd also was a backing vocalist in Fire Inc., a Wagnerian rock band that released two songs for the rock and roll film Streets of Fire (1984).

Dodd is best known for being the male voice heard during the verses of Bonnie Tyler's "Total Eclipse of the Heart". He described the mix of his tenor vocals with Tyler's raspy voice as "Beauty and the Beast but in reverse". The song was a number one in nine countries: the UK, Australia, Canada, Ireland, New Zealand, Norway, South Africa, USA and Zimbabwe.

More recently, Dodd has done voiceover work for commercials. He provided the main voice in the Hungry Hungry Hippos commercial. Additionally, he provided the singing voices for Tex and Rex on the PBS children's show Shining Time Station from 1989 to 1993.

== Awards ==
Dodd was inducted to the Forest City London Music Awards (FCLMA) hall of fame in 2022.

== Personal life ==
Dodd lives in Simcoe, Ontario.

== Partial discography ==
All with asterisks indicate Jim Steinman's involvement.

=== 1970s ===
- Rockabye Hamlet (Studio cast album, 1976)
- Meat Loaf – Bat Out of Hell – (1977)*
- Ted Nugent – Cat Scratch Fever – (1977)
- Ellen Foley – Night Out – (1979)
- Garland Jeffreys – American Boy & Girl – (1979)
- Ian Hunter– You're Never Alone with a Schizophrenic – (1979)

=== 1980s ===
- Jim Steinman – Bad for Good – (1981)*
- Meat Loaf – Dead Ringer – (1981)*
- Karla DeVito – Is This a Cool World or What? – (1981)*
- Peter Criss – Let Me Rock You – (1982)
- Steve Forbert – Steve Forbert – (1982)
- Billy Joel – An Innocent Man – (1983)
- Ian Hunter – All of the Good Ones Are Taken – (1983)
- Air Supply – "Making Love Out of Nothing at All" – (1983)*
- Bonnie Tyler – Faster Than the Speed of Night – (1983)*
- Original soundtrack – Streets of Fire – (1984)*
- Al Corley – Square Rooms – (1984)
- Julian Lennon – Valotte – (1984)
- Lou Reed – New Sensations – (1984)
- Billy Squier – Signs of Life – (1984)*
- Barbra Streisand – Emotion – (1984)*
- Barry Manilow – "Read 'Em and Weep" – (1984)*
- Carly Simon – Spoiled Girl – (1985)
- James Taylor – That's Why I'm Here – (1985)
- Martin Briley – Dangerous Moments – (1985)
- Rory Dodd – "A Kiss is a Terrible Thing to Waste" (demo) – (1985)*
- Rory Dodd – "Night After Night" – (1985)
- Bonnie Tyler – Secret Dreams and Forbidden Fire – (1986)*
- Julian Lennon – The Secret Value of Daydreaming – (1986)
- Patty Smyth – Never Enough – (1987)
- Rory Dodd – "Got Me Singing" – (1987)
- The Monroes – Everything's Forgiven – (1987)
- Survivor – Too Hot to Sleep – (1988)
- Scritti Politti – Provision – (1988)
- Lisa Lougheed – Evergreen Nights – (1988)
- Pandora's Box – Original Sin – (1989)*

=== 1990s ===
- Garland Jeffreys – Matador & More... – (1992)
- Laura Branigan – Over My Heart – (1993)
- Meat Loaf – Bat Out of Hell II: Back into Hell – (1993)*
- Barry Manilow – Another Life – (1995)
- Meat Loaf – Welcome to the Neighborhood – (1995)*
- David Arkenstone – Quest of the Dream Warrior – (1995)
- Bon Jovi – These Days – (1995)
- Celine Dion – Falling into You – (1996)*

=== 2000s ===
- Ian Hunter – Once Bitten Twice Shy – (2000)
