= Pandora's Box (band) =

American female pop group

- Origin: New York City, New York, United States
- Genres: Wagnerian rock; art pop; progressive pop
- Years active: 1989–1990
- Label: Virgin
- Members: Elaine Caswell; Ellen Foley; Gina Taylor; Deliria Wilde; Jim Steinman

Pandora's Box was a female pop group, assembled by Jim Steinman in the 1980s. Some of its members had previously worked with Steinman, in the ensemble Fire Inc., on the album Bat Out of Hell, on live shows and on other studio recordings. They produced one concept album, Original Sin, released in 1989.

== Line-up ==
The listed members, whose photos were put on the album, were Elaine Caswell, Ellen Foley, Gina Taylor, Deliria Wilde and Jim Steinman, who was listed as a keyboardist. The album credits two more artists with lead vocals on songs: Laura Theodore and Holly Sherwood. Additionally, backing vocals were performed by Rory Dodd, Eric Troyer and Todd Rundgren.

Foley had worked with Steinman on Bat Out of Hell and Neverland. Holly Sherwood was a member of his group Fire Inc. Caswell has worked with Steinman on many projects, including The Dream Engine. In 2005 and 2006, she performed "It's All Coming Back to Me Now" at shows called Over the Top and The Dream Engine, respectively, at Joe's Pub in New York City.

Gina Taylor is also known as Gina Taylor Pickens, and was previously a stage actress off-Broadway and member of the band Musique. She previously worked with Steinman as part of the background vocals on the track "This Corrosion" by the Sisters of Mercy.

Jim Steinman said that Pandora's box was one of his favorite mythologies.

Elaine Caswell stated in interview (in 2018) that Pandora's Box was "four women; three that existed and [...] Deliria Wilde who was somewhat mythical, someone [Steinman] kind of created".

== Discography ==
=== Albums ===
List of albums, with selected chart positions
Title	Album details	Peak chart positions	
Title	Album details	AUS	SWE
Original Sin	Released: 1989; Format: CD; Label: Virgin	127	43

=== Singles ===
List of singles, with selected chart positions
Title	Year	Chart positions		Album
Title	Year	AUS	UK	Album
"It's All Coming Back to Me Now"	1989	133	51	Original Sin
"Good Girls Go to Heaven (Bad Girls Go Everywhere)"	1990	—	100	Original Sin
"Safe Sex (When It Comes 2 Loving U)"	1990	—		Original Sin
