= Roy Bittan =

American keyboardist, member of the E Street Band (born 1949)

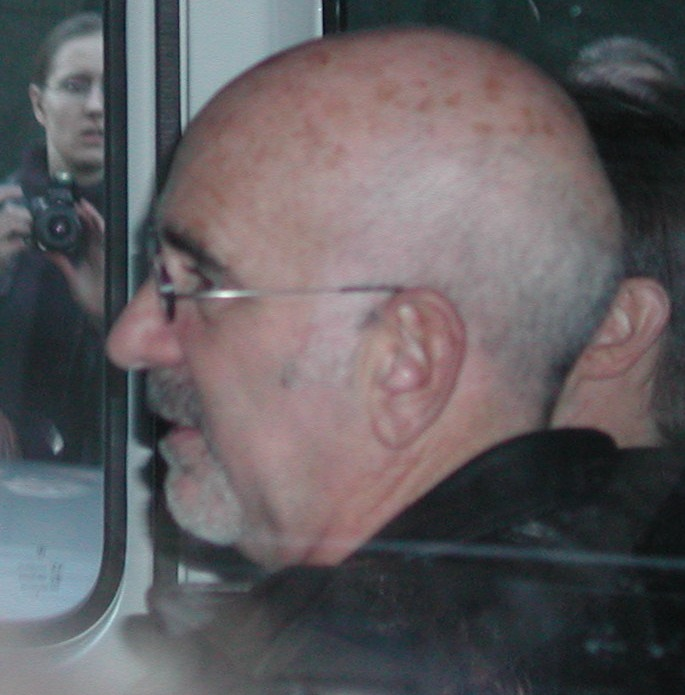
- Bittan in 2002

Background information
- Also known as: The Professor
- Born: July 2, 1949 (age 77); Queens, New York, United States
- Genres: Rock and roll
- Occupation: Musician
- Instruments: Keyboards; accordion
- Member of: E Street Band

Roy J. Bittan (born July 2, 1949) is an American musician who is a long-time member of Bruce Springsteen's E Street Band. Nicknamed "The Professor", Bittan joined the E Street Band in 1974. He plays the piano, organ, accordion and synthesizers. Bittan was inducted into the Rock and Roll Hall of Fame in 2014 as a member of the E Street Band.

Aside from his membership in the E Street Band, Bittan has worked as a session musician for singer-songwriters and rock and pop artists.

== Life and career ==
Bittan was born in the Queens borough of New York City and is Jewish. He is a longtime member of Bruce Springsteen's E Street Band and has performed on the majority of Springsteen's albums, beginning with Born to Run (1975). In Springsteen's band introductions, Bittan's "Professor" moniker was given because (supposedly) he was the only member of the group with a college degree. Bittan provided backing vocals for the song Thunder Road, along with Steven Van Zandt and Mike Appel. When Springsteen decided to break his connection with the E Street Band in 1989, Bittan was the only member he retained.

With the E Street Band, Bittan uses a Yamaha grand piano, preferring the bright sound to cut through the group's sound compared with other acoustic models. He has also been known to use Yamaha, Korg and Kurzweil keyboards as part of his live rig. Bittan is an avid accordion player, which was a skill he seldom used with the E Street Band until he played "American Land" as the closing number on the 2007–2008 Magic Tour and later played the instrument on "4th of July, Asbury Park (Sandy)" after the death of bandmate Danny Federici.

Aside from his membership in the E Street Band, Bittan has worked as a session musician for singer-songwriters and rock and pop artists, including Bonnie Tyler, Jon Bon Jovi, David Bowie, Jackson Browne, Lucinda Williams, Tracy Chapman, Chicago, Catie Curtis, Dire Straits, Bob Dylan, Peter Gabriel, Ian Hunter, Meat Loaf, Stevie Nicks, Bob Seger, Lou Reed, Celine Dion, Nelly Furtado, Patty Smyth, and Jim Steinman.

Bittan played piano on Meat Loaf's 1977 hit album Bat Out of Hell. Composer Jim Steinman wanted Bittan for the album due to his love for Springsteen's early work, particularly on Born to Run. Following those sessions, Bittan regularly and nearly exclusively collaborated with Steinman, appearing on three more Meat Loaf albums (most notably Bat Out of Hell II: Back into Hell), Steinman's solo album Bad for Good, an Air Supply single, a Barbra Streisand single, an album by Pandora's Box, Total Eclipse of the Heart, and others.

Bittan also played on the Dire Straits album Making Movies (1980). Mark Knopfler's decision to have the keyboardist on the album's lineup was reportedly influenced by his affection for "Because the Night", a keyboard-driven hit song cowritten by Springsteen and Patti Smith.

Bittan played on the 1978 second solo album from Peter Gabriel, appearing on the songs "On the Air", "Mother of Violence", "D.I.Y." and "White Shadow". Bittan also played on two David Bowie albums, Station to Station (1976) and Scary Monsters (1980).

Bittan influenced the sound Stevie Nicks created for her solo debut away from Fleetwood Mac, Bella Donna (1981). About the time that the album reached number one in the United States (and Springsteen's The River Tour concluded), Bittan joined as a sideman on a short tour with Nicks along with some of the other top musicians of the day: Benmont Tench on organ, bass guitarist Bob Glaub, Waddy Wachtel on guitar, Russ Kunkel on drums, and Bobbeye Hall on percussion. Bittan also played on Nicks' second solo album The Wild Heart and has continued to play with her sporadically.

Bittan produced and played accordion on Lucinda Williams's album Car Wheels on a Gravel Road. He also played accordion on Nelly Furtado's album The Spirit Indestructible on a track entitled "Waiting for the Night".

Bittan released his first solo album, Out of the Box, in 2014.
