= Jim Steinman =

American musical artist (1947–2021)

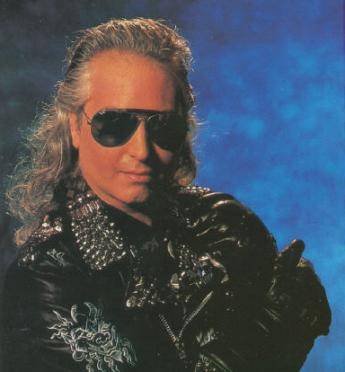
- Steinman, c. 1989

Background information
- Born: James Richard Steinman; November 1, 1947; Hewlett Harbor, New York, U.S.
- Died: April 19, 2021 (aged 73) Danbury, Connecticut, U.S.
- Genres: Rock; pop; Wagnerian rock; musical theatre
- Occupations: Composer; lyricist; record producer
- Years active: 1968–2021
- Website: jimsteinman.com

James Richard Steinman (November 1, 1947 – April 19, 2021) was an American composer, lyricist and record producer. He also worked as an arranger, pianist, and singer. His work included songs in the adult contemporary, rock, dance, pop, musical theater, and film score genres. He wrote albums for Bonnie Tyler and Meat Loaf, including Bat Out of Hell (one of the best-selling albums in history), and also wrote and produced Bat Out of Hell II: Back into Hell and Tyler's Faster Than the Speed of Night.

His most successful chart singles include Tyler's "Total Eclipse of the Heart", Air Supply's "Making Love Out of Nothing at All", Meat Loaf's "I'd Do Anything for Love (But I Won't Do That)", the Sisters of Mercy's "This Corrosion" and "More", Barry Manilow's "Read 'Em and Weep", Take That's "Never Forget", Celine Dion's cover of "It's All Coming Back to Me Now" (originally released by Steinman's project Pandora's Box) and Boyzone's "No Matter What". Steinman's only solo album, Bad for Good, was released in 1981.

Steinman's work also extended to musical theater, where he began his career. He was credited with the book, music, and lyrics for Bat Out of Hell: The Musical, lyrics for Whistle Down the Wind, and music for Tanz der Vampire.

== Early life ==
Steinman was born November 1, 1947, in Hewlett Harbor, New York, the son of Eleanor, a teacher of Latin, and Louis Steinman, who owned a steel distribution warehouse. He was of Jewish ancestry.

Steinman graduated from George W. Hewlett High School in 1965. In 1963, during his sophomore year at Hewlett High School, Steinman won Newsday's January essay contest on American History for his essay on what he believed were the three greatest American inventions. Steinman received his bachelor's degree from Amherst College in 1969.

== Career ==
=== 1960s ===
In March 1968, Steinman contributed music for an Amherst College adaptation of Bertolt Brecht's A Man's a Man. In May 1968, he directed an Amherst production of Michael McClure's The Beard. Over the summer of 1968, he contributed music for an adaptation of Brecht's Baal by the Island Theater Workshop on Martha's Vineyard.

As a senior at Amherst College in Massachusetts, Steinman wrote the book, music and lyrics for The Dream Engine (April 1969), a musical that was used to fulfil the requirements for an independent study course in his senior year. Steinman himself played Baal while an audition call went out to fellow students for the remaining roles of the production. Barry Keating (serving as the co-creator and director) also played the role of the Historian/Narrator and worked extensively with Steinman to compile the book for the production, often shouting lines from the audience and sourcing heavily from their earlier work with Brechtian form and tropes. The play was presented at the Amherst campus's "Kirby Theater" in April 1969 and transferred to nearby Holyoke for a small handful of performances, infamously drawing the attention of local authorities for its ensemble-wide display of nudity in the finale (an element that was begrudgingly muted for the off-campus performances).

The Dream Engine, set in a satirical-dystopian 1969, is the story of a young boy named Baal who, along with his rebel fellows, does not accept the restraints and limits of their society. Baal is the leader of a self-assembled group of wild boys called The Tribe, whose mortal enemies are Max and Emily, the parents of the Girl, a young woman with whom Baal has fallen in love. Several motifs, lyrics, and monologues from this show appear in songs Steinman later released. For example, the lyrics "turn around bright eyes" from "Total Eclipse of the Heart" can be heard in the song titled "The Formation of the Tribe". This was originally a reference to the blast flash of nuclear explosions, and the full riff of the original Dream Engine composition that can be heard in the musical break of the Bonnie Tyler recording, including symbolic musical "blasts" to punctuate each phrase. Multiple esoteric references to "silver" and "gold" also occur first, throughout the book, and appear in numerous later Steinman works, and the full monologue that was later recorded to open "You Took The Words Right Out Of My Mouth (Hot Summer Night)" is delivered in a love scene between Baal and The Girl.

Steinman said in an interview that Joseph Papp, founder of the New York Shakespeare Festival, saw the play and was so impressed he signed it up during intermission. He wanted to bring it to New York (either Broadway or Central Park), but balked when his Amherst faculty advisor explained to Papp that, contrary to Papp's published claim, Steinman was never threatened with "near-expulsion" from the college. Nonetheless, Steinman worked under Papp after his years at Amherst College.

=== 1970s ===
In 1971, Steinman provided music for a puppet show titled Ubu. The show, put on by puppeteer and filmmaker Demian, was an adaptation of Ubu on the Hill, an 1888 play by Alfred Jarry. In 1972, Steinman worked with college friend Barry Keating on a musical titled Rhinegold at the Mercer Arts Center, based on Richard Wagner's opera Das Rheingold. Steinman wrote the music and Keating wrote the lyrics. In 1972, Bette Midler sang a demo of the Steinman song "Heaven Can Wait". Midler's career was at an early stage at the time; she went on to far greater fame, making that demo a collector's item.

In 1973, Steinman's song "Happy Ending" appeared on the album Food of Love, sung by Yvonne Elliman. This was the first commercially released recording of a song written by Steinman. That same year, Steinman wrote music and lyrics for a musical titled More Than You Deserve (1973). One of the actors cast in this show was Marvin Lee Aday, who went by the nickname Meat Loaf, with whom Steinman later collaborated. In 1973, a single of the song "More Than You Deserve", from the musical sharing that name, was released. Reid Whitelaw was the producer and Norman Bergen was the arranger, with Meat Loaf as the lead singer. A cover of this single also appears on the 1981 album Dead Ringer.

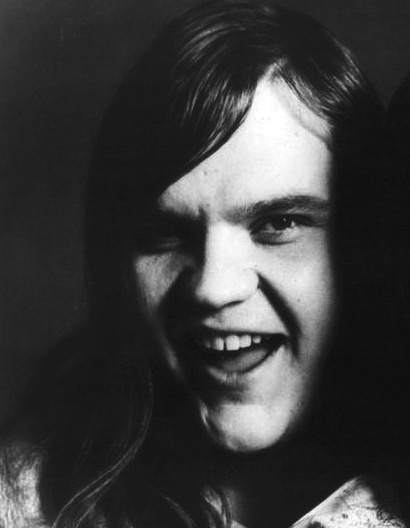
Steinman achieved commercial success during the 1970s, particularly in part due to his partnership with Meat Loaf (pictured)

In 1975, while working for Joseph Papp at the New York Shakespeare Festival, Steinman contributed music and lyrics to Thomas Babe's Kid Champion, which starred Christopher Walken. In 1976, there was a minor one-month run of a musical titled The Confidence Man. It was based loosely on the novel by the same title by Herman Melville. The book and lyrics were written by Ray Errol Fox, the music by Steinman. Ray Fox described the 1976 production as "a capsule version of the show". In 1986, a more elaborate production of the show with added songs was held at Queens College in New York City. It was directed by Susan Einhorn and performed by Queen's College students. Orchestrations were by Steven Margoshes, a frequent Steinman collaborator. One song from The Confidence Man, "Milady", was recorded by Barry Manilow, but never released. The melody of that song later appeared in Tanz der Vampire as the melody of "Für Sarah" (for Sarah). Some music from this show later appeared in the hit song "Making Love Out of Nothing at All", and in the score of the film A Small Circle of Friends. A cast album of the songs from The Confidence Man, produced by Jeff Olmstead, was released in 2003. A cabaret show featuring songs from The Confidence Man was presented in 1977 at the Manhattan Theatre Club, where Steinman had previously written music for another cabaret show titled Bloodshot Wine.

Since 1974, Steinman had been working on a musical entitled Neverland (its only performances were during a 1977 workshop at the John F. Kennedy Center in Washington D.C.) Adapted largely from the Steinman/Keating source material developed for the Dream Engine, it also loosely sourced material from Peter Pan by J. M. Barrie. Steinman and Meat Loaf, who were touring with The National Lampoon Show, felt that three songs were "exceptional" and Steinman began to develop them as part of a seven-song set they wanted to record as an album. The three songs were "Bat Out of Hell", "Heaven Can Wait" and "The Formation of the Pack", which was retitled "All Revved Up With No Place to Go". The show also contained Steinman's "Bolero" (a.k.a. "Great Bolero's of Fire") which was later used at many live shows featuring Steinman's work. Steinman originally wanted Kim Milford to sing the album Bat Out of Hell, but later changed his mind.

Steinman and Meat Loaf had immense difficulty finding a record company willing to sign them. According to Meat Loaf's autobiography, the band spent most of 1975, and two-and-a-half years, auditioning Bat Out of Hell and being rejected. CBS executive Clive Davis even claimed that Steinman knew nothing about writing, or rock music in general. Recording started in 1976 in Bearsville, near Woodstock. After numerous further rejections, the album was released by Cleveland International Records in October 1977. The album was an immediate success in Australia and the United Kingdom, and later in the United States. Reports vary as to how many copies of the album have been sold, but in 2007, Cleveland International Records founder Steve Popovich said that it was around 40 million copies. The highest-charting song from the album was "Two Out of Three Ain't Bad", which reached No. 11 on the Billboard Charts.

In 1979, the Freeway Records label made a double compilation album titled L.A. Radio. It was not commercially released, but promo copies were distributed. It included a spoken word segment titled "Shadows on the Freeway", written and recited by Steinman. It later appeared on the 1981 album Dead Ringer with a new title, "Nocturnal Pleasure". Parts of it can also be heard at the beginning of the 1989 music video, directed by Ken Russell, for the first release of the song "It's All Coming Back to Me Now". Steinman wrote the theme music for the 1979 National Lampoon sitcom Delta House. Sean Kelly and Tony Hendra wrote the lyrics. Michael Simmons sang the lead vocal. The music from this later appeared on the song "Dead Ringer for Love".

=== 1980s ===
In 1980, the film A Small Circle of Friends was released. It had an orchestral score composed by Steinman, and orchestrated by his frequent collaborator Steve Margoshes. The motifs of this orchestral score match the melodies of numerous songs Steinman later released, including "Total Eclipse of the Heart", "Making Love Out of Nothing at All" and "Für Sarah" from Tanz der Vampire. Early in the production of a follow-up album to Bat Out of Hell, Meat Loaf developed vocal problems and was unable to continue on the project. Steinman proceeded with the album, released as Bad for Good in 1981. Most songs are sung by Steinman himself. Three of the songs are sung by Rory Dodd, who did not receive a clear indication for his work in the album's credits, and Karla DeVito sings a duet part on one song. Steinman was this time credited as co-producer with Todd Rundgren for all but one track. Steinman was credited as co-producer with Jimmy Iovine for the song "Rock and Roll Dreams Come Through". Meat Loaf again recorded songs by Steinman on the album Dead Ringer (1981). All of the songs on the album were written by Steinman. One of the songs, "More Than You Deserve", was previously released. Stephan Galfas was the primary producer for this album. Steinman's role in this album was less than his role in Bad for Good. The highest-charting song on this album was "Dead Ringer for Love", a duet with Cher, which peaked in the UK Singles Chart at No. 5, while the album reached No. 1 on the UK Albums Chart.

Steinman is credited as music producer of every track on Bonnie Tyler's album Faster Than the Speed of Night (1983). Steinman also wrote and composed two of the songs on the album: "Total Eclipse of the Heart" and "Faster Than the Speed of Night", the album's title track. On the inner cover of the album, Steinman is also credited with being the "seductive female voice" speaking the words "I'd do anything for love, but I won't do that", on the song "Getting So Excited", the same words that would later become the title of a hit single Steinman wrote for Meat Loaf which was released ten years later. For a period in 1983, two songs written and produced by Steinman held the top two positions on the Billboard singles chart, with "Total Eclipse of the Heart" at number one, and "Making Love Out of Nothing at All", performed by Air Supply, at number two. "Making Love Out of Nothing at All" appeared on Air Supply's 1983 compilation albums Greatest Hits and Making Love... The Very Best of Air Supply.

Barry Manilow's compilation album Greatest Hits Vol. II (1983) included the song "Read 'Em and Weep", written, composed, and produced by Steinman. It had appeared on Meat Loaf's Dead Ringer album in 1981, but with a slightly different lyric. The song stayed at No. 1 on the Adult Contemporary Chart for six consecutive weeks. In 1983, Ian Hunter released his album All of the Good Ones Are Taken. On the title selection, "All of the Good Ones Are Taken", Steinman is credited with "assistance". Rory Dodd and Eric Troyer, two singers who often sang on Steinman's studio work, were credited with "additional background vocals". In 1984, the film Streets of Fire was released. The soundtrack included two songs written, composed, and produced by Steinman. They were "Tonight Is What It Means to Be Young" and "Nowhere Fast". The performance of these two songs is credited to "Fire Incorporated", which was a reference to an assembly of studio musicians and singers hired for these two songs. The voices heard on these songs include those of Rory Dodd, Holly Sherwood, and Laurie Sargent.

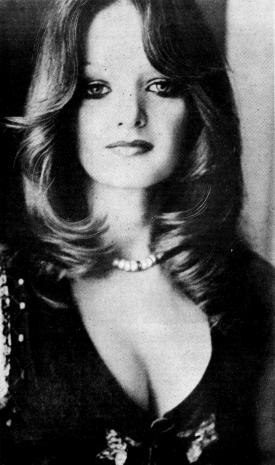
Steinman formed a successful partnership with Bonnie Tyler (pictured) during the 1980s, writing her signature song "Total Eclipse of the Heart"

Steinman is credited for producing all the selections on Billy Squier's album Signs of Life (1984), and Barbra Streisand's album of the same year, Emotion, featured "Left in the Dark", which Steinman wrote, composed and produced. The song had previously appeared on Bad for Good. The soundtrack for the 1984 film Footloose included the song "Holding Out for a Hero", performed by Bonnie Tyler. Steinman produced the selection and is credited with composing the music, and Dean Pitchford, who had written the film itself directly for the screen, for writing the lyrics. The song was a hit single, and both the soundtrack album and film were successful. Some of the music from this song was adapted from the music used for the song "Stark Raving Love" from the album Bad for Good. In 1984, Steinman was hired by, and worked briefly with, rock band Def Leppard on some tracks that were intended for a Def Leppard album. However, Steinman was fired, and the recording work he made with the band was not released. The next album Def Leppard released after this, Hysteria, was produced by Robert John "Mutt" Lange.

Steinman wrote a song titled "Vaults of Heaven" which has the same melody as "Milady" from The Confidence Man and "Für Sarah" from Tanz der Vampire. Rory Dodd sang a demo of "Vaults of Heaven" in 1984. In 1985, Steinman wrote, composed, and produced a theme song for WWF performer Hulk Hogan. It was released in 1985 on the album titled The Wrestling Album. The selection was recorded during the recording sessions for Secret Dreams and Forbidden Fire, an album that Bonnie Tyler was then recording, and which Steinman also produced. The selection has no lead vocals, and it matches much of the non-vocal parts of the track "Ravishing" that appeared on Secret Dreams and Forbidden Fire. The track was also heard as the theme music on the animated television show Hulk Hogan's Rock 'n' Wrestling. Steinman produced the track "Love Can Make You Cry", written by Michael Kehr, Don Kehr and Ian Hunter, for the soundtrack album for the 1986 film Iron Eagle. This was a modified version of the original recording of the same song, which had appeared on Urgent's 1985 album Cast the First Stone. The original recording had been produced by Ian Hunter and Mick Ronson.

According to Steinman in an interview, Andrew Lloyd Webber approached him to write lyrics for The Phantom of the Opera because Lloyd Webber felt that his "dark obsessive side" fitted in with the project. However, Steinman declined in order to fulfill his commitments to a Bonnie Tyler album. In 1986, the album Secret Dreams and Forbidden Fire was released. Bonnie Tyler sang lead vocals, and Steinman produced all the selections on the album. Four of the songs on the album were written and/or composed by Steinman. One, "Holding Out for a Hero", was the same track from the Footloose soundtrack. The other three were "Ravishing", "Rebel Without a Clue" and "Loving You's a Dirty Job but Somebody's Gotta Do It", a duet with Todd Rundgren. This album was the first time Steinman worked with Steven Rinkoff, who was a recording engineer on this album. The Jim Steinman-directed video for "If You Were A Woman And I Was A Man" was nominated for six Billboard Video Awards.

In 1987, the Sisters of Mercy released their second album Floodland. The track "This Corrosion" was produced by Steinman as was "Dominion/Mother Russia". the latter actually co-produced by Steinman, along with Larry Alexander and Andrew Eldritch. The soundtrack album for the 1989 film Rude Awakening included two tracks produced by Steinman. One was the song "Rude Awakening", with lead vocals by Bill Medley and was written by Rick Rose and Paul Rothchild. The other, "Darling Be Home Soon", which featured lead vocals by Phoebe Snow, had been written, composed and originated by John Sebastian.

In 1989, the album Original Sin was released, by the artist Pandora's Box. Pandora's Box referred to a group assembled by Steinman, including, officially, four female singers and Steinman himself. The official four female singers were Ellen Foley, Elaine Caswell, Gina Taylor and Deliria Wilde, (with Holly Sherwood doing lead vocals on "Good Girls Go to Heaven"). Gina Taylor, who is now better known as Gina Taylor-Pickens, was previously in the group Musique, who had a hit single in 1978 with "In the Bush". In an interview, Elaine Caswell said Pandora's Box was "four women; three that existed and [...] Deliria Wilde who was somewhat mythical, someone [Steinman] kind of created".

Sales of Original Sin in Europe were low, but the album was successful in South Africa and reached No. 1 on the album charts there. It was not released at all in North America. Years later, it was reissued and became available internationally on compact disc. Original Sin included the original recording of "It's All Coming Back to Me Now", sung by Elaine Caswell. Two songs from this album, "It Just Won't Quit" and "Good Girls Go to Heaven (Bad Girls Go Everywhere)" were re-recorded and released on Bat Out of Hell II: Back into Hell.

In the late 1980s, Steinman worked on an adaptation of the 1974 film Phantom of the Paradise by writer and director Brian De Palma. Steinman made demos for this project. His demos included Rory Dodd singing "Making Love Out of Nothing at All", with an extra verse not heard in the Air Supply recording, and a 1980s recording of "Who Needs the Young?". Also in the late 1980s, Steinman was preparing to produce an album for ELO Part II, a spin-off of the group Electric Light Orchestra. Steinman made a demo of Rory Dodd singing the song "Kiss Me Red" by Billy Steinberg and Tom Kelly. ELO Part II released their album Electric Light Orchestra Part Two in 1990, without Steinman producing. Eric Troyer, a frequent background vocalist on Steinman's productions, sang the lead vocal on ELO Part II's released recording of "Kiss Me Red".

=== 1990s ===
With Andrew Eldritch, Steinman co-wrote and co-produced the track "More" for the album Vision Thing (1990) by the Sisters of Mercy. Around 1992, Steinman worked with the punk band Iron Prostate, which featured guitarist and writer George Tabb. The group reportedly dissolved while working with Steinman on what was to be their second album. Tabb's website has shared a recording of the song "Bring Me The Head of Jerry Garcia", with Steinman credited as executive producer. The song's lyric says of Jerry Garcia, "he plays guitar like diarrhea".

After a series of financial and legal disputes during the 1980s, Steinman and Meat Loaf met at the singer's house in Connecticut at Christmas 1989 or 1990 and sang "Bat out of Hell" with Steinman playing the piano. Steinman says that "working together again seemed like the cool thing to do." In 1993, the album Bat Out of Hell II: Back into Hell was released. Steinman wrote all the songs, and was credited as producer and arranger. Steven Rinkoff was, as usual, credited as co-producer, and others received co-producer credits. The album was successful, reaching the peak position on albums charts in many countries. The album had three top 40 singles, with "I'd Do Anything for Love (But I Won't Do That)" reaching the peak position on pop singles charts in 28 countries. The other top 40 singles from this album were "Rock and Roll Dreams Come Through" and "Objects in the Rear View Mirror May Appear Closer than They Are".

"Original Sin", the eponymous song on the 1989 Pandora's Box album, featured on the soundtrack album for the film The Shadow (1994). The lyric on this release was slightly different from that heard on the original release of this song. Steinman also produced this version, with lead vocals by Taylor Dayne. In 1995, the band Watershed released the album Twister. Steinman was executive producer for the album, and Steinman's partner Steven Rinkoff was producer for all but one track of it. The album consisted of songs written by the band members. In 1995, Bonnie Tyler released the album Free Spirit, featuring two tracks produced and written by Steinman. They were dance versions of the past hits "Two Out of Three Ain't Bad" and "Making Love Out of Nothing at All". Steinman, along with Brothers in Rhythm and David James, with Steven Rinkoff as associate producer and engineer, co-produced the song "Never Forget". It was written by Gary Barlow, for the British group Take That. It was released on the album Nobody Else (1995) and reached the No. 1 position on the UK singles chart. Like many Steinman/Rinkoff productions, it featured programming and keyboard work by Jeff Bova.

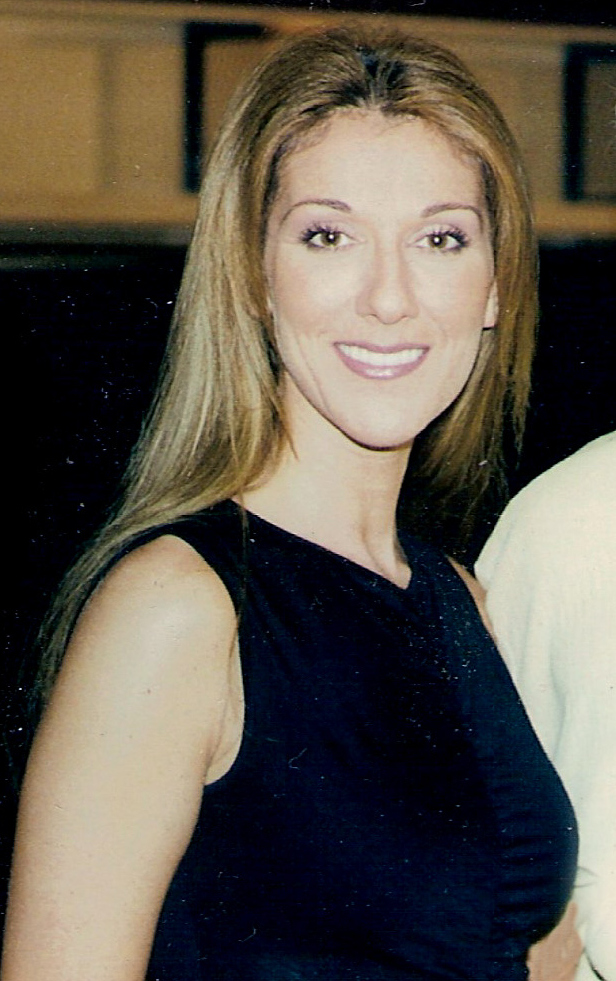
Steinman's collaboration with Celine Dion (pictured) on her Falling into You album in 1996 earned him a Grammy Award for Album of the Year

Celine Dion's album Falling into You (1996) included the song "It's All Coming Back to Me Now", written and produced by Steinman. He also produced, but not authored, two other songs on the album: "River Deep, Mountain High" and "Call the Man". "It's All Coming Back to Me Now" reached No. 2 on the Billboard chart, and won Steinman the award for BMI song of the year. That award is given for the song, out of all those represented in the BMI catalog, that received the most radio airplay in a particular year. This album as a whole won two 1997 Grammy Awards, for Best Pop Album and for Album of the Year. Steinman also produced the track "Us", written by Billy Pace, for Dion's album Let's Talk About Love (1997). Steinman's production team prepared a recording of the Steinman/Black song "Is Nothing Sacred" for that album, but it was removed shortly before the album's release.

Steinman produced two tracks for films in the late 1990s. He produced "In the Dark of the Night", written by Stephen Flaherty and Lynn Ahrens, for the soundtrack album of the film Anastasia (1997). He also produced "I Want to Spend My Lifetime Loving You" (music by James Horner, lyric by Will Jennings) for the film The Mask of Zorro (1998). Lead vocals were a duet between Tina Arena and Marc Anthony, and the track also appeared on Tina Arena's album In Deep (1997).

No later than 1996, Steinman worked on a movie musical titled Bat Out of Hell 2100. This was a predecessor to Bat Out of Hell: The Musical, and it built upon the storyline of Steinman's Neverland musical from the 1970s. This movie was not made. Steinman also made demos for Bat Out of Hell 2100. Those include Kyle Gordon a.k.a. Scarpia singing "All Revved Up With No Place To Go" with an alternate lyric, Ellen Foley singing "City Night", and Marcus Lovett singing "Total Eclipse of the Heart". "City Night" incorporates material from "Come With Me" from Tanz der Vampire and Dance of the Vampires, which uses the melody from "New Orleans is Comin' To Me" from The Confidence Man and "The Future Ain't What It Used To Be".

Steinman provided lyrics for Andrew Lloyd Webber's musical Whistle Down the Wind, which opened in Washington, D.C. in December 1996. However, it received poor reviews and the Broadway run, scheduled for the following April, was cancelled. A reworked and more successful West End production opened at the Aldwych Theatre on July 1, 1998. In addition to a full-length cast album for the London production, an album was released of well-known performers singing pop versions of the songs from the show. This album was produced by Steinman with Rinkoff. Those performers included Tom Jones, Tina Arena, Boyzone, Elaine Paige, Donny Osmond, The Everly Brothers, Meat Loaf, Boy George, Sounds of Blackness, Bonnie Tyler, Michael Ball, and Lottie Mayor. One track, "No Matter What" performed by Boyzone, reached the peak position on the pop charts in many countries. The same track appeared on a Boyzone album and their greatest hits album. As of 2019, Boyzone's 1998 recording of "No Matter What" is the most recent new song or project written at least in part by Steinman, or to contain any new work of his at all, to achieve major, chart-topping success. The track "Whistle Down the Wind", performed by Tina Arena, from the same album, also had some chart success. There was also a single released in the UK for charity, of children from Red Hill Primary School and Sylvia Young Theatre School performing "When Children Rule The World". The singers were named the Red Hill Children, and the single peaked at No. 40 on the UK singles chart.

Tanz der Vampire (Dance of the Vampires), opened in Vienna, Austria on October 4, 1997. The show was adapted from Roman Polanski's movie The Fearless Vampire Killers (1967), and initially directed by Polanski himself. It won six International musical awards, at the International Musical Award Germany (IMAGE 1998), in Düsseldorf. There have been translated productions of Tanz der Vampire in Estonia, Poland, Finland, Hungary and Japan. Many of the various productions of Tanz der Vampire have had cast recordings released, some of them produced by Steinman, along with other co-producers. Like much of Steinman's work, the show includes adaptation (or, recycling) of material Steinman had released before. This includes the song "Total Eclipse of the Heart", the melody of "Objects in the Rear View Mirror May Appear Closer than They Are", and many other parts of earlier works.

Ten previously released Steinman songs were included on the double-disc compilation album The Very Best of Meat Loaf (1998). The included recording of the song "Life Is a Lemon and I Want My Money Back" was a new remix made by Steinman's production team. The compilation also included three new recordings of songs co-written by Steinman, all three of which he produced. They include the hybrid track "Home By Now/No Matter What" and "A Kiss Is a Terrible Thing to Waste" from Whistle Down the Wind. Also included is the song "Is Nothing Sacred", on which Steinman wrote music for Don Black's lyrics. "Is Nothing Sacred" was re-recorded as a duet featuring Patti Russo for its single release in 1999. The duet debuted at #15 on the UK charts.

=== 2000s ===
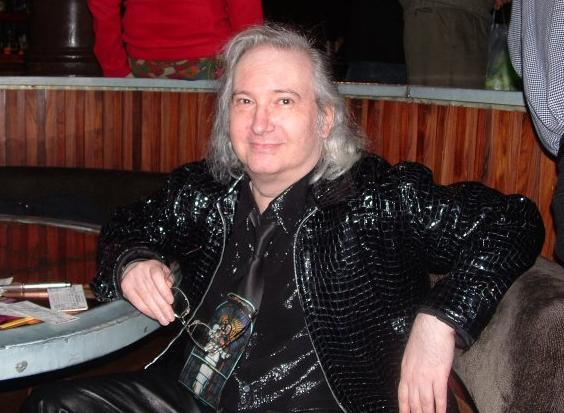
Steinman in 2005

In 2000, South African singer Jennifer Jones sang at the World Aids Day concert. Jones performed "The Future Ain't What It Used To Be". The World Aids Day concert was broadcast worldwide. In 2001, the box set Andrew Lloyd Webber: Now & Forever was released. It included a recording, produced by Steinman, Webber, and Rinkoff and Nigel Wright, of the Steinman/Webber song "A Kiss Is a Terrible Thing to Waste", from Whistle Down the Wind. It was credited to The Metal Philharmonic Orchestra, which was an unrealized performance project idea. Kyle Gordon, a.k.a. "Scarpia", a singer on many demo recordings for Steinman, sang the lead vocal. Around 2001, Steinman was working with singer Karine Hannah. Plans to make an album with her were eventually abandoned. The songs on these demos are "Safe Sex", "Making Love Out of Nothing at All", "Is Nothing Sacred" and "Braver Than We Are". Steinman also recorded her voice on a demo of "Catwoman's Song", which recycled parts of the Steinman/Eldritch song "More". This demo was part of Steinman's preparations for the unrealized Batman: The Musical. In 2002, Russell Watson released the album Encore. It included the Steinman/Black song "Is Nothing Sacred". Steinman had originally worked on his production of this song with Watson on lead vocals.

Composed by Michael Reed and Steinman, with a script by Warner Brown, Garbo – the Musical, about the life of the screen idol Greta Garbo, opened in Sweden to poor reviews in 2002. Preparation for a stage musical based on the Batman comic book series began early in the decade, with Steinman working on the music and lyrics. In August 2002, the New York Post reported that Warner Bros. had signed Tim Burton to direct. According to an unnamed source Burton was attracted to the project because it was as dark as his 1989 film Batman rather than "the goofy, campy turn the franchise took with Batman Forever and Batman and Robin, both of which were directed by Joel Schumacher." Steinman said about Burton and the project, "It's more like his first two movies than any of the other movies. It's very dark and gothic, but really wildly funny. It was my dream that he do this." However, Warner Bros. cancelled its plans to cast and stage the show. Steinman later shared some of the song demos from the show via the Dream Pollution website. The Dream Engine has, according to its website and MySpace page, also worked on recordings of some of the songs that were in the show. That includes the songs "We're Still The Children We Were Then" and "Not Allowed To Love".

Steinman was executive producer for the 2003 MTV television film Wuthering Heights. He has cited Emily Brontë's novel, which had inspired "It's All Coming Back to Me Now", as one of his favorites. A limited-release six-track soundtrack CD was sold through MTV, on Steinman and Rinkoff's Ravenous Records label. Steinman is credited as producer for the album and most of its tracks, and Rinkoff is credited with recording, mixing and co-production. That album included a simple recording of the Steinman/Eldritch song "More" with actors Mike Vogel and Erika Christensen performing lead vocals. It also included the first release of the song "If It Ain't Broke (Break It)", written by Steinman, with lead vocals by Mike Vogel. The album also has a version of "The Future Ain't What It Used to Be" by Steinman with lead vocals from Erika Christensen.

In 2002, the Opera Babes released the album Beyond Imagination. Steinman produced the track "Vittoria!", adapted from the Giuseppe Verdi opera Aida. Rinkoff was credited with co-production, recording and mixing. Like many Steinman productions, it included work by electronic-music arranger and programmer Jeff Bova. Steinman was also credited as arranger, along with Bova and Jon Cohen. In 2004, the film Shrek 2 was released, along with a soundtrack album. The album has two dance covers of the Steinman/Pitchford song "Holding Out for a Hero", one with vocals by Jennifer Saunders and the other credited to Frou Frou. In 2005, The Everly Brothers released a limited edition album titled On the Wings of a Nightingale: The Mercury Studio Recordings. This album included the song "A Kiss Is a Terrible Thing to Waste", written and produced by Steinman. The recording on that album was made in 1987, during the recording sessions that ended up being the 1989 album Some Hearts. However, the Steinman song was not released until 2005. This song is different from the song with the same title in Whistle Down the Wind. The two songs with this title share only a few words and no music in common, with the Everly Brothers version containing musical motifs recycled from the Steinman song "Out of the Frying Pan (And Into the Fire)". Steinman also wrote a later incarnation of "A Kiss Is A Terrible Thing To Waste", with partly different music and a partly different lyrics. Steinman made a recording of this later incarnation with Gina Taylor, singing the lead vocal. That recording was most likely made when the Pandora's Box album Original Sin was recorded.

A separate and very different show from Tanz der Vampire, Dance of the Vampires opened on Broadway on October 16, 2002. After the original director left the show, it was directed by John Rando, who joined shortly before the opening. The book was written by David Ives and was notable for the large number of jokes, many of which had a silly or vulgar quality to them. Whereas Tanz had been a "sung-through" musical with no breaks in the music (like an opera), Dance of the Vampires was a humorous spoken play with songs inserted at some parts. The reviews were negative. It closed on January 25, 2003, after 61 preview and 56 regular performances. Financially, it lost roughly $17 million. Steinman did not attend the opening night, in order to show his disgust with the show. In his blog, Steinman also described the show as "DOTV, which you guys know I hated & was disgusted by, & [I] was FIRED by my manager, acting as producer!" The manager he was referring to was David Sonenberg, who was one of the producers of the show and Steinman's longtime manager.

During the concerts in his Hair of the Dog tour, Meat Loaf told the audience that he and Steinman would be releasing a new album. Later, Meat Loaf said that "lawyers worked for over a year putting together a contract for Steinman to do Bat Out of Hell III. It was one of the best producer's contracts in the history of the record business". According to Meat Loaf, the composer had suffered some health setbacks, including a heart attack. Ultimately, according to the singer, Steinman was not well enough to work on such an intense project. However, Steinman's manager refuted this version, saying that Steinman's "health is excellent" and although he had some "meaningful health problems about four years ago... he's been totally healthy the last couple of years... that's not the reason he didn't participate in [Bat III]".

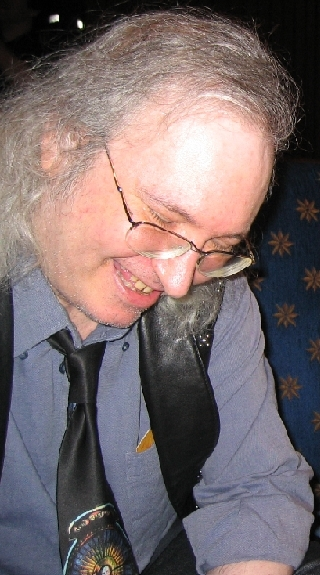
Steinman in 2005

Produced by Desmond Child, Bat Out of Hell III: The Monster Is Loose was released in October 2006. It has fourteen songs, seven of which were written by Steinman; five of these were covers of songs already released on other albums. The other two were adapted from Steinman's demos of songs that were intended for musical theater projects. Steinman's demo of "In the Land of the Pig, the Butcher is King", with Rob Evan singing lead vocal, was part of the preparations for the unrealized Batman: The Musical project. Steinman's demo of "Cry to Heaven", with Kyle Gordon singing lead vocal, was intended for the possibility that Steinman would provide songs for a musical based on the film Cry-Baby. Cry-Baby has since been staged, but without any work from Steinman. In 2006, the album's title became the subject of a legal battle between Steinman and Meat Loaf. Steinman had registered a trademark on the title "Bat Out of Hell" in 1995, and sought to prevent Meat Loaf from using the title. Meat Loaf sought to cancel Steinman's trademark and use the title. Aside from the trademark case, he sued Steinman and longtime manager David Sonenberg for $50 million each, for a total of $100 million. An out-of-court settlement was reached, ending the legal cases, allowing Meat Loaf to use the title for this album, and allowing Meat Loaf to release his recordings of the songs "In the Land of the Pig the Butcher Is King" and "Cry to Heaven". The agreement allowed Steinman to use the title "Jim Steinman's Bat Out of Hell" for a musical theatre project based on the songs from Bat Out of Hell. This project was announced for opening on February 17, 2017, in Manchester.

In 2006, Westlife released The Love Album. It contained a cover of "Total Eclipse of the Heart", produced by Steve Mac. First publicly presented in early 2006, Steinman and Rinkoff created a music performance group named The Dream Engine. The group has worked on studio recordings and held live shows in New York City. It also performed at an award show in Atlanta, Georgia. The people in this project were the first to publicly perform the songs "What Part of My Body Hurts the Most", "We're Still the Children We Once Were", "Speaking in Tongues", "Not Allowed to Love" and "(It Hurts) Only When I Feel". The last of those songs is partly adapted from "If It Ain't Broke (Break It)". This project was also the first to perform a revised and politicized lyric to "Braver Than We Are". With the new lyric, the song alternatively has been called "An American Elegy" and "God's Gone A.W.O.L." According to Steinman's blog, this project was "guided" by Rinkoff. This project has not performed or been active in public since 2006.

=== 2010s ===
In January 2012, it was announced that Steinman was working with Terry Jones of Monty Python fame on a heavy metal version of The Nutcracker. In February of the same year, it was announced that Steinman would be inducted into the Songwriters Hall of Fame on June 14. On April 10, 2012, Amherst College announced that Steinman would receive an honorary degree at the college's 191st commencement on May 20. However, honorary degrees are awarded only in person, and Steinman "had to cancel due to unforeseen circumstances". On April 17, 2013, the college announced that Steinman would speak at a "conversation" on campus that will be open to the public on May 25, and would receive an honorary degree, a doctorate of humane letters, at the college's 192nd commencement on May 26. In April 2013, Meat Loaf said that he and Steinman will collaborate on three new songs to be included on Meat Loaf's album Braver Than We Are, which was (at the time) to be released in 2015. In 2016, Jim Steinman was inducted into the Long Island Music Hall of Fame.

Meat Loaf's album Braver Than We Are was released in Europe on September 9, 2016, and in North America on September 16, 2016. It contains ten songs composed by Steinman. Paul Crook produced the album. Like Desmond Child's Bat Out of Hell III: The Monster Is Loose, this album was made separately from the production team of Steinman and Rinkoff. Rob Evan was the first singer to perform the songs "Only When I Feel" and "Speaking in Tongues", in 2005 and 2006.

In February 2017, Steinman's Bat Out of Hell: The Musical opened for previews at the Manchester Opera House in Manchester, England, then officially premiered at the same venue, continuing on to the London Coliseum in June. This musical was based on multiple projects, including Steinman's Neverland musical from the 1970s, the hit albums Bat Out of Hell, Bat Out of Hell II: Back into Hell, and on assorted other recordings from Steinman's career. This musical did not contain any songs that had not been previously performed in public by mid 2006, though two songs - "Not Allowed to Love" and "What Part of My Body Hurts the Most" had never been released on any albums or as singles at that point. The musical performed at Toronto's Ed Mirvish Theatre, then finished in January 2018 to make a return to London in 2018, this time the Dominion Theatre. A German version of the show was produced by Stage Entertainment, and ran at Oberhausen's Metronom Theatre from November 2018 to September 2019. The Oberhausen production featured Willemijn Verkaik in the role of Sloane on launch, but she left the show at the end of March 2019. Steinman had also set an American tour of the musical to take place starting in late 2018 through 2019, but it was cancelled after its three-week run in the first city Toronto was completed. The musical began a limited six week run in New York City's Center Theatre from August 1 to September 8, 2019.

A cast recording album for Bat Out of Hell: The Musical co-produced by Steinman, Rinkoff, and Reed was released in October 2017 on the BOOH Label, which was created specifically for this album. The album was first distributed in Canada to coincide with the show's run in Toronto, then later was released again via Ghostlight Records in July 2018, both as a worldwide digital release and on CD for sale in the UK to coincide with the show's run at the Dominion Theatre, London. The cast album featured the vocals of the show's cast in Manchester, with Andrew Polec and Christina Bennington leading in their roles as Strat and Raven, Rob Fowler and Sharon Sexton as Falco and Sloane, and Danielle Steers and Dom Hartley-Harris as Zahara and Jagwire. Of this original cast, only Andrew Polec, Christina Bennington and Danielle Steers remained with the show from opening in Manchester in 2017 through to complete the New York run in 2019.

In March 2017, Velvet Valve Records digitally released a recording of Hannah singing "Braver Than We Are". This recording is different from the recording of her singing the same song from the early 2000s.

== Personal life ==
Responding to an interviewer's assertion that his songs are tragic, Steinman said he has "never been stomped on literally. Figuratively, I am stomped on every day ... anyway, that is the way I feel sometimes. I've never had my heart broken the way you are talking about. I've never been dumped... but probably because I don't allow myself to be dumped".

At the time of his death, Steinman lived in Ridgefield, Connecticut. According to The New York Times, Steinman lived alone in his 6,000 square-foot house described as a "majestic museum of the self, attached to a quaint cottage in the woods of Ridgefield. He spent years expanding and reimagining the house, transforming it into an embodiment of his own eccentric, complicated personality".

=== Health and death ===
Steinman had a stroke in 2004 and temporarily lost the ability to speak. He had another stroke four years prior to his death.

Per the death certificate from the Connecticut Department of Health, Steinman died from kidney failure at a hospital in Danbury, Connecticut, on April 19, 2021, at the age of 73. Upon Steinman's death, rock writer Paul Stenning said he left a "tremendous legacy", referring to him as "the greatest ever composer of symphonic rock" and citing him as an influence on a variety of bands across many genres.

His frequent collaborator Meat Loaf (who died nine months after Steinman) reacted to Steinman's death by saying, "We didn't know each other, we were each other."

== Awards and nominations ==
=== Grammy Awards ===
Year	Category	Nominated work	Result	Ref.
1985	Best Score Soundtrack for Visual Media	Footloose	Nominated	
1994	Song of the Year	"I'd Do Anything for Love (But I Won't Do That)"	Nominated	
1994	Best Rock Song	"I'd Do Anything for Love (But I Won't Do That)"	Nominated	
1997	Album of the Year	Falling Into You	Won	
