= Wagnerian rock =

Music blending rock and roll and opera

Wagnerian rock is the merger of 20th-century rock and roll and 19th-century opera reminiscent of Richard Wagner or Phil Spector's Wall of Sound. The term was coined by songwriter and producer Jim Steinman to describe Meat Loaf's Bat Out of Hell trilogy of albums.

== See also ==
- Progressive rock
- Power metal
- Symphonic metal
- Rock opera
