= 1993 in British music =

This is a summary of 1993 in music in the United Kingdom, including the official charts from that year.

== Summary ==
15 songs reached the number 1 spot this year. Compared to 1992, there was an improvement to singles sales, with sales rising year on year for the first time since 1989. However, none of the singles released this year were million sellers, the first instance of this happening since 1990. The only song to sell over a million in 1993 was one from the previous year, Whitney Houston's cover of "I Will Always Love You". It managed to sell sufficiently well enough to make its way onto the top 10 of both 1992 and 1993.

March saw The Bluebells reach number 1 with "Young at Heart", a song that had previously made number 8 in 1984. It was reissued after appearing in an advert for Volkswagen, and the band reformed to promote the song.

Take That got their first #1 in July, with "Pray". Debuting in 1991 with the #38 hit "Promises", they would go on to score another seven number 1s before splitting in 1996. "Pray" was followed by Freddie Mercury scoring a posthumous number 1 with a remixed version of "Living on My Own", the original version of which made number 50 in 1985, making it the first remix of a previously charted single to reach number 1.

The biggest selling single of the year came from Meat Loaf, who hit #1 for seven weeks from October with "I'd Do Anything for Love (But I Won't Do That)". It came from the album Bat Out of Hell II: Back into Hell, also the biggest selling of the year.

Finally, as usual, December saw the Christmas number one single. Meat Loaf's successor at number 1 was Mr. Blobby, a popular character on the BBC One show Noel's House Party, with "Mr. Blobby" (the first ever eponymously titled number 1 single). In the final week before Christmas, he was knocked off by Take That's "Babe", making Mr. Blobby the first one-week #1 since U2's "The Fly" in November 1991, and making Take That the first act to have three singles in a row all enter at #1. However, the following week (Christmas week) saw Mr. Blobby climb back up to the top, the first time this had happened since January 1969, and officially become this year's Christmas number 1. Take That's "Babe" became the only chart topper of the year to spend only a week at the summit.

In the classical world, the British composer Michael Nyman enjoyed great success with his soundtrack for the film The Piano, which brought him an Ivor Novello Award, Golden Globe, BAFTA and American Film Institute award; the album sold over three million copies. Veteran Welsh composer Daniel Jones died. A less well-known composer, Peter Reynolds, won notoriety when his three-minute work Sands of Time was performed in Cardiff city centre; it is listed by the Guinness Book of Records as the world's shortest opera.

== Events ==
- 11 February – Still Sorrowing for piano by Thomas Adès is performed for the first time, in the Purcell Room by the composer.
- 19 February – Elton John is forced to end a concert in Melbourne, Australia a half hour early when a swarm of grasshoppers invades the stage.
- 27 March – Sands of Time, a short (four minutes long) opera by Welsh composer Peter Reynolds, libretto by Simon Rees, has its world premiere at an outdoor shopping centre in Cardiff, sung by soprano Rhian Owen and baritone Dominic Burns.
- 16 April – Paul McCartney headlines a concert at the Hollywood Bowl, USA to celebrate "Earth Day". Other performers included Ringo Starr, Steve Miller and Don Henley.
- 21 April – Former Rolling Stones bassist Bill Wyman marries designer Suzanne Accosta in France.
- 22 April – The Who's Tommy opens on Broadway.
- 7 May – The premiere of Harrison Birtwistle's Five Distances for Five Instruments, takes place in London at the Purcell Room, performed by the Ensemble intercontemporain.
- 31 May – Oasis force their way on to the bill at King Tut's Wah Wah Hut, Glasgow. Alan McGee is in attendance, and then offers the band a recording contract on the spot.
- 5 June – premiere of Jonathan Harvey's Inquest of Love at the London Coliseum.
- 28 August – Bruce Dickinson plays his final show with Iron Maiden after announcing his departure from the band earlier in the year. He would rejoin the band in 1999.
- 7 September – Berthold Goldschmidt‘s 12 minute orchestral work Ciaconna Sinfonica is performed for the first time in the UK by Simon Rattle at the Proms. The 90 year-old composer, resident in London since 1935, takes a bow at the end.
- 22 October – Oasis sign a recording contract with Creation Records
- Rick Astley retires from the music industry at age 27 after selling 40 million records in a five-year period.

== Charts ==
=== Number-one singles ===
| Chart date (week ending) | Song | Artist(s) | Sales |
|---|---|---|---|
| 2 January | "I Will Always Love You" | Whitney Houston | 180,795 |
| 9 January | "I Will Always Love You" | Whitney Houston | 82,620 |
| 16 January | "I Will Always Love You" | Whitney Houston | 61,000 |
| 23 January | "I Will Always Love You" | Whitney Houston | 52,000 |
| 30 January | "I Will Always Love You" | Whitney Houston | 50,000 |
| 6 February | "I Will Always Love You" | Whitney Houston | 44,000 |
| 13 February | "No Limit" | 2 Unlimited | 51,000 |
| 20 February | "No Limit" | 2 Unlimited | 65,000 |
| 27 February | "No Limit" | 2 Unlimited | 68,000 |
| 6 March | "No Limit" | 2 Unlimited | 53,000 |
| 13 March | "No Limit" | 2 Unlimited | 57,000 |
| 20 March | "Oh Carolina" | Shaggy | 64,000 |
| 27 March | "Oh Carolina" | Shaggy | 67,000 |
| 3 April | "Young at Heart" | The Bluebells | 67,000 |
| 10 April | "Young at Heart" | The Bluebells | 74,000 |
| 17 April | "Young at Heart" | The Bluebells | 64,000 |
| 24 April | "Young at Heart" | The Bluebells | 48,000 |
| 1 May | Five Live | George Michael & Queen with Lisa Stansfield | 73,000 |
| 8 May | Five Live | George Michael & Queen with Lisa Stansfield | 93,000 |
| 15 May | Five Live | George Michael & Queen with Lisa Stansfield | 64,000 |
| 22 May | "All That She Wants" | Ace of Base | 92,000 |
| 29 May | "All That She Wants" | Ace of Base | 104,000 |
| 5 June | "All That She Wants" | Ace of Base | 84,000 |
| 12 June | "(I Can't Help) Falling In Love With You" | UB40 | 77,000 |
| 19 June | "(I Can't Help) Falling In Love With You" | UB40 | 84,000 |
| 26 June | "Dreams" | Gabrielle | 75,000 |
| 3 July | "Dreams" | Gabrielle | 71,000 |
| 10 July | "Dreams" | Gabrielle | 67,000 |
| 17 July | "Pray" | Take That | 82,000 |
| 24 July | "Pray" | Take That | 60,000 |
| 31 July | "Pray" | Take That | 54,000 |
| 7 August | "Pray" | Take That | 49,000 |
| 14 August | "Living on My Own" | Freddie Mercury | 48,000 |
| 21 August | "Living on My Own" | Freddie Mercury | 57,000 |
| 28 August | "Mr. Vain" | Culture Beat | 50,000 |
| 4 September | "Mr. Vain" | Culture Beat | 77,000 |
| 11 September | "Mr. Vain" | Culture Beat | 64,000 |
| 18 September | "Mr. Vain" | Culture Beat | 54,000 |
| 25 September | "Boom! Shake the Room" | DJ Jazzy Jeff & The Fresh Prince | 52,000 |
| 2 October | "Boom! Shake the Room" | DJ Jazzy Jeff & The Fresh Prince | 56,000 |
| 9 October | "Relight My Fire" | Take That featuring Lulu | 90,000 |
| 16 October | "Relight My Fire" | Take That featuring Lulu | 58,000 |
| 23 October | "I'd Do Anything for Love (But I Won't Do That)" | Meat Loaf | 55,000 |
| 30 October | "I'd Do Anything for Love (But I Won't Do That)" | Meat Loaf | 83,000 |
| 6 November | "I'd Do Anything for Love (But I Won't Do That)" | Meat Loaf | 88,000 |
| 13 November | "I'd Do Anything for Love (But I Won't Do That)" | Meat Loaf | 80,000 |
| 20 November | "I'd Do Anything for Love (But I Won't Do That)" | Meat Loaf | 72,000 |
| 27 November | "I'd Do Anything for Love (But I Won't Do That)" | Meat Loaf | 63,000 |
| 4 December | "I'd Do Anything for Love (But I Won't Do That)" | Meat Loaf | 53,000 |
| 11 December | "Mr. Blobby" | Mr. Blobby | 69,000 |
| 18 December | "Babe" | Take That | 133,000 |
| 25 December | "Mr. Blobby" | Mr. Blobby | 99,000 |

=== Number-one albums ===
| Chart date (week ending) | Album | Artist(s) |
|---|---|---|
| 2 January | Greatest Hits: 1965–1992 | Cher |
| 9 January | Greatest Hits: 1965–1992 | Cher |
| 16 January | Greatest Hits: 1965–1992 | Cher |
| 23 January | Live/The Way We Walk, Volume Two: The Longs | Genesis |
| 30 January | Live/The Way We Walk, Volume Two: The Longs | Genesis |
| 6 February | Jam | Little Angels |
| 13 February | Pure Cult | The Cult |
| 20 February | Words of Love | Buddy Holly & The Crickets |
| 27 February | Walthamstow | East 17 |
| 6 March | Diva | Annie Lennox |
| 13 March | Are You Gonna Go My Way | Lenny Kravitz |
| 20 March | Are You Gonna Go My Way | Lenny Kravitz |
| 27 March | Their Greatest Hits | Hot Chocolate |
| 3 April | Songs of Faith and Devotion | Depeche Mode |
| 10 April | Suede | Suede |
| 17 April | Black Tie White Noise | David Bowie |
| 24 April | Automatic for the People | R.E.M. |
| 1 May | Cliff Richard – The Album | Cliff Richard |
| 8 May | Automatic for the People | R.E.M. |
| 15 May | Republic | New Order |
| 22 May | Automatic for the People | R.E.M. |
| 29 May | Janet | Janet Jackson |
| 5 June | Janet | Janet Jackson |
| 12 June | No Limits | 2 Unlimited |
| 19 June | What's Love Got to Do with It | Tina Turner |
| 26 June | Emergency on Planet Earth | Jamiroquai |
| 3 July | Emergency on Planet Earth | Jamiroquai |
| 10 July | Emergency on Planet Earth | Jamiroquai |
| 17 July | Zooropa | U2 |
| 24 July | Promises and Lies | UB40 |
| 31 July | Promises and Lies | UB40 |
| 7 August | Promises and Lies | UB40 |
| 14 August | Promises and Lies | UB40 |
| 21 August | Promises and Lies | UB40 |
| 28 August | Promises and Lies | UB40 |
| 4 September | Promises and Lies | UB40 |
| 11 September | Music Box | Mariah Carey |
| 18 September | Bat Out of Hell II: Back into Hell | Meat Loaf |
| 25 September | In Utero | Nirvana |
| 2 October | Bat out of Hell II: Back Into Hell | Meat Loaf |
| 9 October | Very | Pet Shop Boys |
| 16 October | Bat Out of Hell II: Back into Hell | Meat Loaf |
| 23 October | Everything Changes | Take That |
| 30 October | Bat Out of Hell II: Back into Hell | Meat Loaf |
| 6 November | Bat Out of Hell II: Back into Hell | Meat Loaf |
| 13 November | Bat Out of Hell II: Back into Hell | Meat Loaf |
| 20 November | Both Sides | Phil Collins |
| 27 November | Bat Out of Hell II: Back into Hell | Meat Loaf |
| 4 December | Bat Out of Hell II: Back into Hell | Meat Loaf |
| 11 December | Bat Out of Hell II: Back into Hell | Meat Loaf |
| 18 December | Bat Out of Hell II: Back into Hell | Meat Loaf |
| 25 December | Bat Out of Hell II: Back into Hell | Meat Loaf |

== Year-end charts ==
=== Best-selling singles ===
| No. | Title | Artist | Peak position |
|---|---|---|---|
| 1 | "I'd Do Anything for Love (But I Won't Do That)" | Meat Loaf | 1 |
| 2 | "(I Can't Help) Falling in Love with You" | UB40 | 1 |
| 3 | "All That She Wants" | Ace of Base | 1 |
| 4 | "No Limit" | 2 Unlimited | 1 |
| 5 | "Dreams" | Gabrielle | 1 |
| 6 | "Mr Blobby" | Mr Blobby | 1 |
| 7 | "Oh Carolina" | Shaggy | 1 |
| 8 | "What Is Love" | Haddaway | 2 |
| 9 | "Mr. Vain" | Culture Beat | 1 |
| 10 | "I Will Always Love You" | Whitney Houston | 1 |
| 11 | Five Live (EP) | George Michael and Queen with Lisa Stansfield | 1 |
| 12 | "Young at Heart" | The Bluebells | 1 |
| 13 | "Tease Me" | Chaka Demus & Pliers | 3 |
| 14 | "Babe" | Take That | 1 |
| 15 | "Please Forgive Me" | Bryan Adams | 2 |
| 16 | "Boom! Shake the Room" | Jazzy Jeff & Fresh Prince | 1 |
| 17 | "Informer" | Snow | 2 |
| 18 | "Pray" | Take That | 1 |
| 19 | "Sweat (A La La La La Long)" | Inner Circle | 3 |
| 20 | "Living on My Own" | Freddie Mercury | 1 |
| 21 | "What's Up?" | 4 Non Blondes | 2 |
| 22 | "The Key The Secret" | Urban Cookie Collective | 2 |
| 23 | "Don't Be a Stranger" | Dina Carroll | 3 |
| 24 | "It Keeps Rainin' (Tears from My Eyes)" | Bitty McLean | 2 |
| 25 | "Two Princes" | Spin Doctors | 3 |
| 26 | "Little Bird"/"Love Song for a Vampire" | Annie Lennox | 3 |
| 27 | "The River of Dreams" | Billy Joel | 3 |
| 28 | "Relight My Fire" | Take That featuring Lulu | 1 |
| 29 | "True Love" | Elton John and Kiki Dee | 2 |
| 30 | "The Love I Lost" | West End featuring Sybil | 3 |
| 31 | "Twist and Shout" | Chaka Demus & Pliers featuring Jack Radics and Taxi Gang | 3 (Note: Reached number 1 in 1994) |
| 32 | "Give It Up" | The Good Men | 5 |
| 33 | "For Whom the Bell Tolls" | Bee Gees | 4 |
| 34 | "Right Here" | SWV | 3 |
| 35 | "Mr. Loverman" | Shabba Ranks | 3 |
| 36 | "Moving On Up" | M People | 2 |
| 37 | "U Got 2 Let the Music" | Cappella | 2 |
| 38 | "Exterminate!" | Snap! featuring Niki Haris | 2 |
| 39 | "Deep" | East 17 | 5 |
| 40 | "When I'm Good and Ready" | Sybil | 5 |
| 41 | "Ain't No Love (Ain't No Use)" | Sub Sub featuring Melanie Williams | 3 |
| 42 | "One Night in Heaven" | M People | 6 |
| 43 | "That's the Way Love Goes" | Janet Jackson | 2 |
| 44 | "It's Alright" | East 17 | 5 (Note: Reached number 3 in 1994) |
| 45 | "Tribal Dance" | 2 Unlimited | 4 |
| 46 | "Go West" | Pet Shop Boys | 2 |
| 47 | "Are You Gonna Go My Way" | Lenny Kravitz | 4 |
| 48 | "She Don't Let Nobody" | Chaka Demus & Pliers | 4 |
| 49 | "Why Can't I Wake Up with You" | Take That | 2 |
| 50 | "Give In to Me" | Michael Jackson | 2 |

=== Best-selling albums ===
| No. | Title | Artist | Peak position |
|---|---|---|---|
| 1 | Bat Out of Hell II: Back into Hell | Meat Loaf | 1 |
| 2 | Automatic for the People | R.E.M. | 1 |
| 3 | So Close | Dina Carroll | 2 |
| 4 | Everything Changes | Take That | 1 |
| 5 | One Woman: The Ultimate Collection | Diana Ross | 1 |
| 6 | So Far So Good | Bryan Adams | 1 |
| 7 | Promises and Lies | UB40 | 1 |
| 8 | Both Sides | Phil Collins | 1 |
| 9 | Zooropa | U2 | 1 |
| 10 | Music Box | Mariah Carey | 1 |
| 11 | Pocket Full of Kryptonite | Spin Doctors | 2 |
| 12 | Ten Summoner's Tales | Sting | 2 |
| 13 | End of Part One: Their Greatest Hits | Wet Wet Wet | 4 (Note: Reached number 1 in 1994) |
| 14 | Elegant Slumming | M People | 2 |
| 15 | Duets | Elton John | 5 |
| 16 | Unplugged | Eric Clapton | 2 |
| 17 | Are You Gonna Go My Way | Lenny Kravitz | 1 |
| 18 | The One Thing | Michael Bolton | 4 |
| 19 | Take That & Party | Take That | 2 |
| 20 | Experience the Divine: Greatest Hits | Bette Midler | 3 |
| 21 | Debut | Björk | 3 |
| 22 | Connected | Stereo MCs | 2 |
| 23 | Janet | Janet Jackson | 1 |
| 24 | Keep the Faith | Bon Jovi | 5 (Note: Reached number 1 in 1992) |
| 25 | Emergency on Planet Earth | Jamiroquai | 1 |
| 26 | Diva | Annie Lennox | 1 |
| 27 | Unplugged...and Seated | Rod Stewart | 2 |
| 28 | What's Love Got to Do with It | Tina Turner | 1 |
| 29 | Very | Pet Shop Boys | 1 |
| 30 | 3 Years, 5 Months and 2 Days in the Life Of... | Arrested Development | 3 |
| 31 | River of Dreams | Billy Joel | 3 |
| 32 | The Red Shoes | Kate Bush | 2 |
| 33 | No Limits | 2 Unlimited | 1 |
| 34 | Dangerous | Michael Jackson | 6 (Note: Reached number 1 in 1991) |
| 35 | Duets | Frank Sinatra | 5 |
| 36 | Gold: Greatest Hits | ABBA | 9 (Note: Reached number 1 in 1992) |
| 37 | Walthamstow | East 17 | 1 |
| 38 | Stars | Simply Red | 11 (Note: Reached number 1 in 1991) |
| 39 | The Hits 2 | Prince | 5 |
| 40 | "The Spaghetti Incident?" | Guns N' Roses | 2 |
| 41 | So Natural | Lisa Stansfield | 6 |
| 42 | Ingénue | k.d. lang | 3 |
| 43 | Bat Out of Hell | Meat Loaf | 15 (Note: Reached number 9 in 1981) |
| 44 | A Touch of Music in the Night | Michael Crawford | 12 |
| 45 | Suede | Suede | 1 |
| 46 | In Utero | Nirvana | 1 |
| 47 | Republic | New Order | 1 |
| 48 | Rage Against the Machine | Rage Against the Machine | 17 |
| 49 | The Album | Cliff Richard | 1 |
| 50 | Duran Duran | Duran Duran | 4 |

=== Best-selling compilation albums ===
| No. | Title | Peak position |
|---|---|---|
| 1 | The Bodyguard Original Soundtrack | 1 |
| 2 | Now 26 | 1 |
| 3 | The Best Dance Album in the World... Ever! | 1 |
| 4 | Blues Brother Soul Sister Vol. 2 | 1 |
| 5 | Now 24 | 1 |
| 6 | 100% Dance | 1 |
| 7 | Now 25 | 1 |
| 8 | Originals | 1 |
| 9 | Best of Dance '93 | 1 |
| 10 | 100% Dance Vol. 2 | 1 |

== Music awards ==
=== BRIT Awards ===
The 1993 BRIT Awards winners were:

- Best British producer: Peter Gabriel
- Best soundtrack: Wayne's World
- British album: Annie Lennox – Diva
- British breakthrough act: Tasmin Archer
- British female solo artist: Annie Lennox
- British group: Simply Red
- British male solo artist: Mick Hucknall
- British single: Take That – "Could It Be Magic"
- British video: Shakespear's Sister – "Stay"
- International breakthrough act: Nirvana
- International solo artist: Prince
- International group: R.E.M.
- Outstanding contribution: Rod Stewart

=== Mercury Music Prize ===
The 1993 Mercury Music Prize was awarded to Suede – Suede.

== Classical music ==
- Stephen Caudel – Edel Rhapsody
- Nicholas Maw – Violin Concerto

== Opera ==
- Michael Nyman – Noises, Sounds & Sweet Airs

== Births ==
- 12 January – Zayn Malik (One Direction)
- 17 January – Frankie Cocozza, singer
- 13 February – Sophie Evans, Welsh singer and actress
- 8 April – TBJZL, YouTuber and rapper
- 19 June – KSI, YouTuber and rapper
- 5 July – Hollie Cavanagh, English-American singer
- 26 July – Stormzy, rapper
- 29 August – Liam Payne (One Direction) (died 2024)
- 13 September – Niall Horan (One Direction)
- date unknown – Dani Howard, composer

== Deaths ==
- 23 April – Daniel Jones, composer, 80
- 29 April – Mick Ronson, guitarist (The Spiders from Mars), 46 (cancer)
- 6 May – Ivy Benson, bandleader, 79
- 22 May – Melville Cook, organist, conductor and composer, 80
- 28 May – Duncan Browne, singer-songwriter, 46 (cancer)
- 19 June – Tony Brent, singer, 65 (heart attack)
- 21 June – Al Fairweather, jazz trumpeter, 66
- 7 August – Roy Budd, jazz pianist and film composer, 46 (brain haemorrhage)
- 11 August – Philip Martell, composer, 86
- 14 September – Peter Tranchell, composer, 71
- 30 September – Ronnie Aldrich, jazz musician, 77
- 11 October – Andy Stewart, singer, 59
- 9 November – Stanley Myers, film composer, 63 (cancer)
- 22 November – Anthony Burgess, composer and polymath best known as a novelist, 76
- 28 November – Tommie Connor, songwriter, 89
- 29 November – Alan Clare, jazz pianist and composer, 72
- 6 December – Bryson Graham, rock drummer, 41
- 12 December – Joan Cross, operatic soprano, 93
- 24 December – Ralph Downes, organist and music director, 89

== See also ==
- 1993 in British radio
- 1993 in British television
- 1993 in the United Kingdom
- List of British films of 1993
