= Grimeborn =

Music festival in the United Kingdom

Coordinates: 51°32′49.61″N 0°4′29.81″W

- Genre: Opera festival
- Dates: August
- Locations: Arcola Theatre, London
- Years active: 2007 to present
- Founders: Mehmet Ergen
- Website: https://www.arcolatheatre.com/grimeborn/

Grimeborn is an annual musical theatre and opera festival held at Arcola Theatre in Dalston, East London. It was founded by Arcola Theatre's artistic director Mehmet Ergen in 2007. It takes place in and around August, and tends to showcase new and experimental works alongside radical productions of classic opera, using both the Arcola's performing stages.

== History ==
The festival's name is a punning reference to the world famous East Sussex Glyndebourne Opera Festival. The "grime" element refers to the "dirtier" backdrop of the Arcola Theatre, a converted textile factory in the congested bustle of Hackney as opposed to the scenic gardens of East Sussex.

Originally, Grimeborn was devised as a contemporary contribution to the Battersea Arts Centre's (BAC) Opera Festival. The BAC Opera Festival's Artistic Director at the time, Tom Morris, asked Ergen, who was working at the BAC as an Associate Producer, to create something different from normal operatic preconceptions in a manner similar to Tête à Tête, who were also taking the stage at the BAC Opera Festival that year. Grimeborn became an opera and musical theatre festival in its own right, with the Arcola Theatre its exclusive host.

== Past performances ==
=== 2025 ===
Opera	Composer	Production company	Conductor / Music director	Director	Designer
Testament	Claudio Monteverdi / Leoš Janáček / Libby Larsen / Thomas Weelkes	Green Opera	Alex Raineri	Tobias Millard	Kit Hinchcliffe
The Elixir of Love (Re‑imagined)	Gaetano Donizetti	Baseless Fabric Theatre	Leo Geyer	Joanna Turner	Marina Hadjilouca
Jane Eyre	John Joubert (adaptation)	Arcola Theatre / Green Opera		Eleanor Burke	
Tristan und Isolde	Richard Wagner	ShatterBrain Productions / Regents Opera Ltd	Michael Thrift	Guido Martin‑Brandis	Caitlin Abbott
Sense & Sensibility: The Musical					
Don Giovanni	Wolfgang Amadeus Mozart	Ensemble OrQuesta	Marcio da Silva / Beth Fitzpatrick / Andreas Levisianos	Marcio da Silva	
Becoming Tosca	Giacomo Puccini (with new music by Frank Moon)	Prologue Opera	Lesley Anne Sammons	Rebecca Marine	Viva Halton‑Wright
Lucia di Lammermoor	Gaetano Donizetti	Barefoot Opera	Laurence Panter	Rosie Kat	Fenna de Jonge

=== 2024 ===
Opera	Composer	Production company	Conductor / Music director	Director	Designer
Der Vampyr	Heinrich August Marschner	Gothic Opera	Kelly Lovelady	Julia Mintzer	
La Bohème	Giacomo Puccini	The Opera Makers and Arcola Theatre	Panaretos Kyriatzidis	Becca Marriott	Becky‑Dee Trevenan and Nao Nagai
Mr Punch at the Opera		The Opera Makers		Becca Marriott	
Le Nozze di Figaro	Wolfgang Amadeus Mozart	Ensemble OrQuesta	Kieran Staub	Marcio da Silva	
555: Verlaine en Prison		Green Opera		Eleanor Burke	
Plantaiona	Edward Jessen	Phaedra Ensemble			
La Traviata	Giuseppe Verdi	Barefoot Opera	Laurence Panter	Alfie Chesney & Michael Spenceley	Jane Bruce

=== 2023 ===
Opera	Composer	Production company	Conductor / Music director	Director	Designer
The Merry Wives of Windsor	Otto Nicolai	Queer Voices (Skeive Stemmer)	Knut Eirik Jensen	Lars Harald Maagerø; Kristin Lundemo Overøye	Fridtjof Brevig (set & costumes); Stuart Glover (lighting)
No for an Answer	Marc Blitzstein	Arcola Theatre		Mehmet Ergen	
La Cenerentola	Gioachino Rossini	Barefoot Opera			
Trouble in Tahiti	Leonard Bernstein		Olivia Tait	Finn Lacey	Beri Valentine
Loyola	Domenico Zipoli	El Parnaso Hyspano			
A&E		Muelas + Ward			
Turandot	Giacomo Puccini		Panaretos Kyriatzidis	Becca Marriott	
Céphale et Procris	Élisabeth Jacquet de La Guerre	Ensemble OrQuesta	Márcio da Silva	Márcio da Silva	Márcio da Silva
Brontë	Lisa Logan (based upon a play by Polly Teale)	Keynote Opera	Alex Ingram	Katharina Kastening	Ashley Martin Davies/ Andrew May
The Mikado	Arthur Sullivan / W. S. Gilbert	Charles Court Opera	David Eaton	John Savournin	
Le portrait de Manon / L’heure espagnole	Jules Massenet / Maurice Ravel				

=== 2022 ===
Opera	Composer	Production Company	Conductor or Music Director	Director	Designer
L’Incoronazione di Poppea	Claudio Monteverdi	Ensemble OrQuesta		Marcio da Silva	
Black, el payaso	Pablo Sorozábal	The Cervantes Theatre		Paula Paz	
Siegfried	Richard Wagner (adaptation by Jonathan Dove & Graham Vick)	Arcola Theatre / Hackney Empire	Peter Selwyn	Julia Burbach	Bettina John
Götterdämmerung	Richard Wagner (adaptation by Jonathan Dove & Graham Vick)	Arcola Theatre / Hackney Empire	Peter Selwyn	Julia Burbach	Bettina John
Carmen (re-imagined)	Georges Bizet (re-imagined by Leo Geyer)	Baseless Fabric Theatre	Leo Geyer	Joanna Turner	Marina Hadjilouca
The Boatswain’s Mate	Ethel Smyth	Spectra Ensemble		Cecilia Stinton	
The Magic Flute	Wolfgang Amadeus Mozart (Lindsay Bramley version)	Opera Alegría		Benjamin Newhouse-Smith	Christopher Killerby
Bluebeard’s Castle	Béla Bartók	Green Opera	John Paul Jennings	Eleanor Burke	Emeline Beroud
Sumida River	Kanze Motomasa (traditional)	What More? Productions			
The Bear / And I Decided	William Walton / Daniel Felsenfeld	Opera at Home			
The Unravelling Fantasia of Miss H.	Red Gray & Sarah Nicolls	Stitched-up-theatre			
H.M.S. Pinafore	Arthur Sullivan / W. S. Gilbert	Emma Jude Harris		Emma Jude Harris	
Sin the Musical	John Michael Maloney	Dmii Productions			

=== 2021 ===
Opera	Composer	Production Company	Conductor or Music Director	Director	Designer
Die Valkure	Richard Wagner	Arcola Theatre in partnership with Hackney Empire	Peter Selwyn	Julia Burbach	Bettina John
Alcina	George Frideric Handel	Ensemble OrQuesta	Stephanie Gurga	Marcio da Silva	
Hopes & Fears	Claude Debussy	The Opera Makers	Panaretos Kyriatzidis	Jorge Balsa	Alexander Ridgers
Orfeo ed Euridice / Zanetto (Double Bill)	Christoph Willibald Gluck / Pietro Mascagni	Barefoot Opera	Lesley-Anne Sammons	Lysanne van Overbeek	Bettina John

=== 2019 ===
Opera	Composer	Production company	Conductor or Music Director	Director	Designer
A Hand of Bridge /Sands of Time /Le 66	Samuel Barber, Peter Reynolds, Jacques Offenbach	Irrational Theatre	Peter Jones	Paula Chitty	Paula Chitty
Aurora	Noah Mosley	Bury Court Opera	Noah Mosley	Aylin Bozok	Holly Piggott
Cabildo	Amy Beach	Jessie Anand productions	John Warner	Emma Jude Harris	Max Nicholson-Lailey
Count Ory	Gioachino Rossini	Opera Alegría	Lindsay Bramley	Ben Newhouse-Smith	
Das Rheingold	Richard Wagner, in a reduced version by Jonathan Dove and Graham Vick	Arcola Theatre	Peter Selwyn	Julia Burbach	Bettina John
Die Fledermaus	Johann Strauss II, adapted by Leo Geyer	Baseless Fabric Theatre	Leo Geyer	Joanna Turner	Joanna Turner
Don Jo	Arcola Participation Queer Collective (after Mozart)	Arcola Participation	Nick Bonadies	Leo Doulton	
Hippolyte et Aricie	Jean-Philippe Rameau	Ensemble OrQuesta		Marcio da Silva	Christian Hey
Hotspur /Pierrot Lunaire	Gillian Whitehead /Arnold Schoenberg	formidAbility & SignDance International	Scott Wilson	Sara Brodie	Sara Brodie
I Capuleti e i Montecchi	Vincenzo Bellini	Over the Pond	Kelvin Lim	Lysanne van Overbeek	
Leyla Gencer: La Diva Turca (documentary film)	Zeynep Oral (writer)	IKSV (Istanbul Foundation for Culture and Arts)		Selçuk Metin	
Miss Havisham's Wedding Night /Twelve Poems of Emily Dickinson	Dominick Argento /Aaron Copland	Great Expectations	David Eaton	Ralph Bridle	Amy Watts
Origami Soundscapes /The Crane	Verity Lane	Verity Lane		Verity Lane	
Sane and Sound	Matt Geer	Sane and Sound Opera Company	Finan Jones	Katie Bunting	Sam Harris
Silk Moth /The Heart's Ear /Bel Canto	Bushra El-Turk /Liza Lim /Cassandra Miller	Ruthless Jabiru	Kelly Lovelady	Heather Fairbairn	Charlotte Henery
Treemonisha	Scott Joplin	Spectra Ensemble	Matthew Lynch	Cecilia Stinton	Raphaé Memon
Violetta	Giuseppe Verdi (reduced version of La traviata)	Opera Allegra	William Green	Ashley Pearson	Martin Berry

=== 2018 ===
List not complete: awaiting further additions

Opera	Composer	Production company	Conductor or Music Director	Director	Designer
Greek (30th anniversary production)	Mark-Anthony Turnage	Arcola Theatre	Tim Anderson	Jonathan Moore	Baśka Wesołowska
Lucia di Lammermoor	Gaetano Donizetti	Fulham Opera	Ben Woodward	Sarah Hutchinson	Anna Yates
The Prometheus Revolution	Keith Burstein	Fulham Opera	Ben Woodward	Sophie Gilpin	Sunny Smith
The Boatswain's Mate	Ethel Smyth	Spectra Ensemble	John Warner	Cecilia Stinton	Christianna Mason
Elephant Steps	Stanley Silverman	Patrick Kennedy Theatre Machine	Nathan Jarvis	Patrick Kennedy	Patrick Kennedy

=== 2017 ===
List not complete: awaiting further additions

Opera	Composer	Production company	Conductor or Music Director	Director	Designer
Armide	Jean-Baptiste Lully	Ensemble OrQuesta	Marcio da Silva	Marcio da Silva	
Porgy and Bess	George Gershwin				
Samson and Delilah	Camille Saint-Saëns	Arcola Theatre	Kelvin Lim	Aylin Bozok	Aylin Bozok
The Diary of One Who Disappeared	Leos Janáček	Shadwell Opera	Matthew Fletcher	Jack Furness	Jack Furness

=== 2015 ===
List not complete: awaiting further additions

Opera	Composer	Production company	Conductor or Music Director	Director	Designer
The Medium /The Wanton Sublime	Peter Maxwell Davies /Tarik O'Regan	Opera Room Productions	Andrew Griffiths	Robert Shaw	Gillian Argo
Daphne	Richard Strauss	Opera at Home	José Manuel Gandia	José Manuel Gandia	
Gala	Ergo Phizmiz			Ergo Phizmiz	Luis Carvajal

=== 2014 ===
List not complete: awaiting further additions

Opera	Composer	Production company	Conductor or Music Director	Director	Designer
The Medium	Gian Carlo Menotti	OperaView	Maite Aguirre	Natalie Katsou	Maria Kalamara
Madame X	Tim Benjamin	Radius	Anthony Brannick		Lara Booth
Werther	Jules Massenet		Philip Voldman	Aylin Bozok	

=== 2012 ===
Curated by Mehmet Ergen and produced by Leyla Nazli (21 August - 8 September)

Opera	Composer	Production company	Conductor or Music Director	Director	Designer
Il tabarro	Giacomo Puccini		Philip Voldman	Aylin Bozok	
The Sound of a Voice	Philip Glass	Volta Theatre	Tom Kelly	Andrea Ferran	
Hansel and Gretel	Engelbert Humperdinck	Opera at Home		Jose Gandia	
Bastien und Bastienne	Wolfgang Amadeus Mozart		David Eaton	Nina Brazier	
Susanna's Secret	Ermanno Wolf-Ferrari		David Eaton	Nina Brazier	
Handel Furioso	George Frideric Handel			Max Hoehn	
The Emperor of Atlantis	Viktor Ullmann		Julian Black	Max Hoehn	
La voix humaine	Francis Poulenc	Motion Productions	Jean-Yves Cornet	Ilan Reichel	
Tonseisha	Kim B. Aston	Saltpeter		Gary Merry	
Unleashed	Philip Venables	Fourfortytwo and The Blackburn Company		Nick Blackburn	
The Marriage of Figaro	Wolfgang Amadeus Mozart	Heritage Opera	Chris Gill	Sarah Helsby Hughes	
Rigoletto	Giuseppe Verdi	Heritage Opera		Sarah Helsby Hughes	
Thirteen Days - The Musical	Alexander S. Bermange, arr. Paul Bateman			Matthew Gould	

=== 2011 ===
Opera	Composer	Production company	Conductor or Music Director	Director	Designer
Mansfield Park (World premiere tour)	Jonathan Dove	Heritage Opera	Chris Gill	Michael McCaffery	
Savitri	Wandering Scholar	The Little Opera Company		Daisy Evans	
The Demon Lover					
The Emperor of Atlantis	Viktor Ullmann		John Murton	Max Hoehn	
The Turn of the Screw	Benjamin Britten				
The Diary of One Who Disappeared	Leos Janáček	The Opera Ensemble		Selina Cadell	Guy Burnett
Alcina	Peter Foggit			Jenny Miller and Polly Graham	
The Boy, the Forest and the Desert				Alexandre Barriere	Flora Robertson
Prima la Musica /Der Schauspieldirektor			Ricardo Gosalbo	Jose Gandhia	
The Francis Bacon Opera	Stephen Crowe		Genevieve Ellis		

=== 2010 ===
Curated by Andrew Steggall and produced by Leyla Nazli (9 August – 21 September)

Opera	Composer	Production company	Conductor or Music Director	Director	Designer
The Rape of Lucretia	Benjamin Britten		Thomas Blunt	Max Key	Sarah Bacon
Spilt Milk	Timothy Burke (libretto by James Waterfield)				
Trouble in Tahiti	Leonard Bernstein		Timothy Burke	Nina Brazier	Polly Webb-Wilson
The Prodigal Son /The Homecoming	Benjamin Britten /Felix Mendelssohn		Elizabeth Burgess	Joe Austin	Simon Kenny
Vice	Jools Scott (libretto by Sue Curtis)				
The Raven	Matt Rogers			Sinead O'Neill	Sarah Bacon
Crow	Michael Rouston			Mark McInnes	
Poison Garden	Louis d'Heudieres (libretto by Daisy Evans)	Waistcoat Company	Louis d'Heudieres	Daisy Evans	Daisy Evans
The Diaries of Adam and Eve	David Josiah Moore			Ben Gwalchmai	
How I Wonder	Dominique Le Gendre			Irene Brown	
The Stone Heart	Alexander Campkin (libretto by Lewis Reynolds)				
Cocteau in the Underworld	Ed Hughes (libretto by Roger Morris)	Heather Doole for Metta Theatre	Carlos Del Cueto	Poppy Burton-Morgan	William Reynolds
Les Enfants Terribles	Philip Glass			Andrea Ferran	Sarah Bacon

=== 2009 ===
Curated by Alex Sutton and produced by Leyla Nazli (24 August – 5 September)

- The Descent of Inanna: Bare Bones Version, Produced by: Opera Exchange
- An Unorthodox 1-2 Produced by: Aurelie
- Ride, Produced by: Filament, Composer: Osnat Schmool, Director: Sabina Netherclift
- Phedre, Produced by: ElectrOpera, Composers: Sally Rodgers, Steve Jones, Director: Philippe Cherbonnier
- Something Strange by Rebecca Applin and Michael Caines
- To Die A Second Time, Produced by: Double Agent, Director: Teunkie Van Der Sluijs
- The Tender Land by Aaron Copland, Produced by: Mad Cow Theatre Company, Director: Katherine Hare, musical director: Leigh Thompson, Choreographer: Racky Plews
- The Savage (original story David Almond) & The Island (original story Armin Greeder), Composed, written and performed by the Arcola Youth Project under the guidance of Jenifer Toksvig (libretto) and Nick Sutton (music).
- Disappeared, Produced by: The Theory of Everything, Devised and directed by: Pia Furtado and members of the cast, featuring traditional gypsy music Inspired by and featuring Janáček's song cycle.
- The Work of Art by Conor Mitchell and Jenifer Toksvig
- Goodbye Barcelona, Produced by: Arcola Theatre, Composer: KS Lewkowicz, Playwright: Judith Johnson, Director: Karen Rabinowitz
- Why Are Clowns?, Produced by: L'Oiseau Chante, Composer: Ewen Moore, Director: Aaron Paterson
- Presenting... The News, Produced by: Size Zero Music Theatre, Composer & director: Laura Jayne Bowler
- Dante by Peter Longworth, Director: Holly McBride
- The Wonderful Thing About Lizards by Lucy Smith, Director: Toria Banks
- Abraham and Isaac, Produced by: Metta Theatre, Composer: Benjamin Britten, Director: Poppy Burton-Morgan
- Pig, Greed (Jonathan Dove); Cinderella(Stephen Oliver Produced by: Bitesize Opera, Director: Toria Banks
- Jephtha by Handel, Director: Ralph Bridle, Conductor: Wolfgang Kostner
- Stolen Voices by Neyire Ashworth, Director & Co-devisor: Kath Burlinson
- La Voix Humaine, Produced by: Renée Salewski & Flat Earth Theatre, Composer: Francis Poulenc, Librettist: Jean Cocteau, Director: Robin Norton-Hale
- A Shropshire Lad, Produced by: Pst! Productions, Cast: Peter Shipman, Director: Jan-Willem van den Bosch
- The Telephone by Gian Carlo Menotti, Director: Nina Brazier, Designer: Polly Webb-Wilson, Costumes: Giulia Scrimieri
- The Singing Bone/Domestic, Produced by: The Stephen Crowe Ensemble, Composer: Stephen Crowe, Directors: Seonaid Goody and Stephen Crowe
- The Woodcutter's Daughter, Produced by: Eclectic Opera, Composer: Richard Cartmale, Librettist: Buffy Sharpe, Cast: Belinda Evans, Glenn Tweedie, Peter Shipman
- Songs of Alchemy, Produced by: Eclectic Opera, Composer: Kirsten Morrison, Director: Jan-Willem van den Bosch
- Grimethorpe Race Presented by: Shared Property Theatre Company Directors: Lizzie Newman and Rachel Parish, Designer: Lucy Sierra, Scenic Artist: Zoe Parsons
- The Spoils, Produced by: Shady Dolls Theatre Company, Composer: Paul Englishby, Director: Steven Dykes
- Music Theatre Now - a cabaret evening dedicated to new musical theatre writing. Featured Composers: Conor Mitchell, Adam Guettel, Raymond Yiu, Ricky Ian Gordon, Tim Saward, Matt Print Director: Alex Sutton, Musical Direction: Leigh Thompson, Cast: Clare Burt and the London Show Choir
- Figaro - The Loyal Subject, Produced by: Grimeborn Opera, Composers: Mozart, Rossini, Milhaud, Adaptator & director: Barnaby Rayfield
- Why Don't You Just Sing Jazz?, Produced by: Opera in Colour, Writer & director: Roger Mortimer-Smith, Devised and produced by: Nadine Mortimer-Smith, Musical Direction: Peter Crockford
- Hothouse, Directed by: Sophie Austin, Musical Direction: Jamie Fagg, Produced by: Kas Darley and Sophie Austin

=== 2008 ===
Curated by Daniele Guerra and produced by Michael Harris and Leyla Nazli (4–23 August)

- The Old Maid and the Thief - composer/librettist: Gian Carlo Menotti; director: Nina Brazier; conductor: Timothy Burke
- A Man of Feeling - composer/librettist: Stephen Oliver; director: Anthony Baker; music director: Tim Henty; soprano: Lisa Wilson; baritone: John Savournin; pianist: James Young
- Dreamspiel - performed by the Ukulele Orchestra of Great Britain; composer: George Hincliffe; librettist: Michelle Carter
- Kindertotenlieder (Songs on the Deaths of Children) - composer: Gustav Mahler; producer/performer: Siobhan Mooney, Mezzo Soprano with Devon Harrison, Baritone and lip-synch-mime artists, Dickie Beau and Lisa Lee - semi-staged and re-imagined by Siobhan Mooney as an anguished duet of blame between Father and Mother. Loosely based on the disappearance of Madeleine McCann director: Janwillen van den Bosch; pianist: Linda Ang
- The Elephant's Child - performed by Metta Theatre; composer: Jessica Dannheisser; director: Poppy Burton-Morgan
- The Nightingale and the Rose - composer/librettist: Jenny Gould; director: Tom Mansfield
- Desire Caught by the Tail - composer: Joseph Finlay; director: Max Webster; associate director: Rachel Grunwald
- Goodbye Barcelona - book: Judith Johnson; music and lyrics: Karl Lewkowicz; director: Mehmet Ergen
- ASH - composer: Rachel Fuller; librettist/director: Jack Shepherd
- Opera of Surveillance - performed by Conversations with Sound and The Irrepressibles; composer/voice practitioner: Jamie McDermott; sound design: William Turner Duffin
- My Feet May Take a Little While (The Errollyn Wallen Songbook) - composer/music director: Errollyn Wallen; director: Daniele Guerra
- Man with a Movie Camera - based on the score composed by Michael Nyman for the British Film Institute's 2002 release of the silent movie Man with a Movie Camera; director: Nigel Lowery
- Kaspar Hauser - based on the story of Kaspar Hauser; composer: Alexis Pope; librettist/director: Anke Rauthmann; musical director: Philip Headlam; designer: Num Stibbe
- Pierrot Lunaire - performed by Cornucopia Theatre Company; composer: Arnold Schoenberg to poems by Albert Giraud; director: Mark Duncan
- Choice - performed by Citric Acid Productions
- Astyanax - by Waterfield & Burke
- A Little Chamber Music - based on the work by Hindemith
- The Boy Who Said Yes by Bertolt Brecht and Kurt Weill; musical director: Timothy Burke; director: Alex Sutton
- The Girl Who Liked to be Thrown Around - performed by Madestrange Opera; composer: Michael Oliva; text: Michael Oliva and Deepak Kalha
- The Bacchae - composer/librettist/musical & artistic director: Alexis Pope; soprano: Tatjana Kiliani; tenor: Emmanuel Fort; bass: Andrew Young; First Bacchae: Sibylla Meienberg
- Stabat Mater - adapted by Buffy Sharpe from Pergolesi's Stabat Mater; performed by Eclectic Opera; director: Poppy Burton-Morgan; soprano: Anna Gregory; countertenor: Peter Shipman; actress: Sarah Paul
- Holoray Holiday - book and lyrics: Rebecca and Sharon Nassauer; composer: Sharon Nassauer; director: Michael Alvarez; musical director: Candida Caldicot

=== 2007 ===
Curated by Andrew Steggall and produced by Michael Harris and Leyla Nazli (19 August- 2 September)

- The Crocodile - composed by Llywelyn ap Myrddin. Directed by Alex Sutton.
- Hey Jack - composed by Sharon Nassauer, Lyrics by Jackson Lee and directed by Loveday Ingram.
- Nosferatu
- Opera Cabaret
- The Tales of Hoffmann - based on Offenbach's Les contes d'Hoffmann
- Dichterliebe - composed by Robert Schumann to poetry by Heinrich Heine
- Devils Drum
- Arianna a Naxos - based on Haydn's cantata of the same name
- Visions of 7 – conceived and composed by Joanna Foster, performed by 'Anima' with Javier Carmona on percussion.
- Vice - jazz opera based on The Revenger's Tragedy by Cyril Tourneur. Written by Jools Scott and Sue Curtis. Directed by Sue Curtis.
- The Universal Will to Self-Destruct
- Flood - composed & written by Kirsten Morrison and Buffy Sharpe. Performed by Kirsten Morrison Soprano, Siobhan Mooney Mezzo Soprano and Oliver Gibbs Baritone Visuals by Franny Armstrong.
- Pierre - adapted by composer Richard Beaudoin, conducted by Christopher Ward, directed by Andrew Steggall, and played by Constantine Finehouse. The cast included Joseph Kaiser (Tamino in Kenneth Branagh's film The Magic Flute),
- Persephone - a masque in the making. Words by Simon Rae, music by Sue Casson. Amongst the performers Felix Kemp and Sue Casson.
- Fountain Sealed - by Nathan Williamson, Thomas Walton and James Methven.

== See also ==
- List of opera festivals
- List of music festivals in the United Kingdom

== Sources ==
- Arcola Theatre Past productions. Accessed 17 February 2009.
- Christiansen, Rupert, Grimeborn review: Thrilling romanticism at a very hip party, Daily Telegraph, 31 August 2007. Accessed 17 February 2009.
- Kimberley, Nick, Glorious grime in Grimeborn, Evening Standard 5 August 2008. Accessed 17 February 2009.
- Blunt, Thomas, Conductor Music at Plush, “Music at Plush” thomasblunt.com Accessed 16 August 2010
- Tanner, Mark, grimeborn-experience, “The Spectator, 5 September 2009, Accessed 16 August 2010.
- Taylor, Sebastian, classical-and-jazz-preview-fourth-grimeborn-festival-opera-and-music-arcola-t, “Islington Tribune”, 12 August 2010, Accessed 16 August 2010
- , “Hackney Gazette”, 9 July 2010, Accessed 16 August 2010
- Hall, George,the-prodigal-son-the-homecoming, “The Stage”, 11 August 2010, Accessed 16 August 2010
- summer-of-grime, “East London Lines”, 11 August 2010, Accessed 15 August 2010
- Baracaia, Alexa, grimeborn-preview-grimy-answer-to-glyndebourne-in-dalston, “The London Paper”, 20 August 2009, Accessed 15 August 2010
