= Le 66 =

Opérette by Jacques Offenbach

Jacques Offenbach by Nadar, c. 1860s

Le 66 is an opérette in one act of 1856 with music by Jacques Offenbach. The French libretto was by Auguste Pittaud de Forges and Laurencin (Paul Aimé Chapelle). Kurt Gänzl describes the work as "in the rustic vein of Le violoneux and Le mariage aux lanternes".

== Performance history ==
The premiere was at the Théâtre des Bouffes-Parisiens (Salle Lacaze) Paris, on 31 July 1856, one of nine one-acters produced by the Bouffes Parisiens that year. Le 66 remained in the Bouffes Parisiens répertoire, and was played by them in Vienna in 1862. It had already been seen at the Carltheater in that city in 1859, was produced in Budapest in 1860, and mounted in London in 1865 and 1876. It was revived in Paris in 1984 at the Studio Bertrand alongside Pépito.

Contemporary critics particularly admired in the score the romance and tyrolienne and the entry song of the colporteur.

In 2019, Le 66 was performed in a triple bill (with Samuel Barber's A Hand of Bridge and Peter Reynolds' Sands of Time) at the Grimeborn Festival, Dalston, London.

== Roles ==
Roles, voice types, premiere cast
Role	Voice type	Premiere cast, 31 July 1856 Conductor: Jacques Offenbach
Frantz, a young Tyrolean, travelling singer	tenor	Gerpré
Grittly, his cousin, travelling singer	soprano	Maréschal
Joseph Berthold	baritone	Guyot

== Synopsis ==
En route for Strasbourg two starving travellers reach the outskirts of Stuttgart. Grittly has learnt that her sister is in great distress and set off to see her; Frantz has gone with her. On meeting a pedlar on the road Frantz wins 100,000 florins in a lottery with the ticket 66. He borrows money from the pedlar and goes off to the town on a spending spree, returning in expensive grotesque clothes. Grittly and he argue – and then discover that the ticket is actually 99. However, the pedlar turns out to be a rich long-lost relation (and husband of Grittly's sister) who wanted to give Frantz a lesson in the dangers of extravagance.

== Musical numbers ==
- Introduction with offstage duo
- Romance « En apprenant cette détresse » and Tyrolienne « Dans mon Tyrol »
- Air « Voilà le colporteur »
- Trio « Et maintenant lisez-nous ça »
- Couplets « C’était la compagne fidèle »
- Couplets « Cocasse ? moi »
- Trio « O ciel ! ô ciel ! »
- Final « Ah ! quel bonheur »
