= Wine Dark Sea =

Wine dark sea may refer to:

- Wine-dark sea (Homer), an English translation of an epithet in the Ancient Greek works of Homer
- The Wine-Dark Sea, the 16th novel in the Aubrey-Maturin series by Patrick O'Brian
- Wine Dark Sea (rock symphony)
- Wine Dark Sea (Jon English album), 1973
- Wine Dark Sea (Jolie Holland album), 2014
- The Wine Dark Sea: Homer's Heroic Epic of the North Atlantic, a 1964 work concerning Odysseus' voyages by Henriette Mertz
- "The Wine Dark Sea", a story by Robert Aickman and also the collection which contains it
- Wine-Dark Sea, a 2014 symphony for wind ensemble by John Mackey

== See also ==
- Over the Wine Dark Sea, a historical novel by H.N. Turteltaub (a pseudonym of Harry Turtledove)
