= La Délivrance de Thésée =

Opera by Darius Milhaud

- Opera by Darius Milhaud
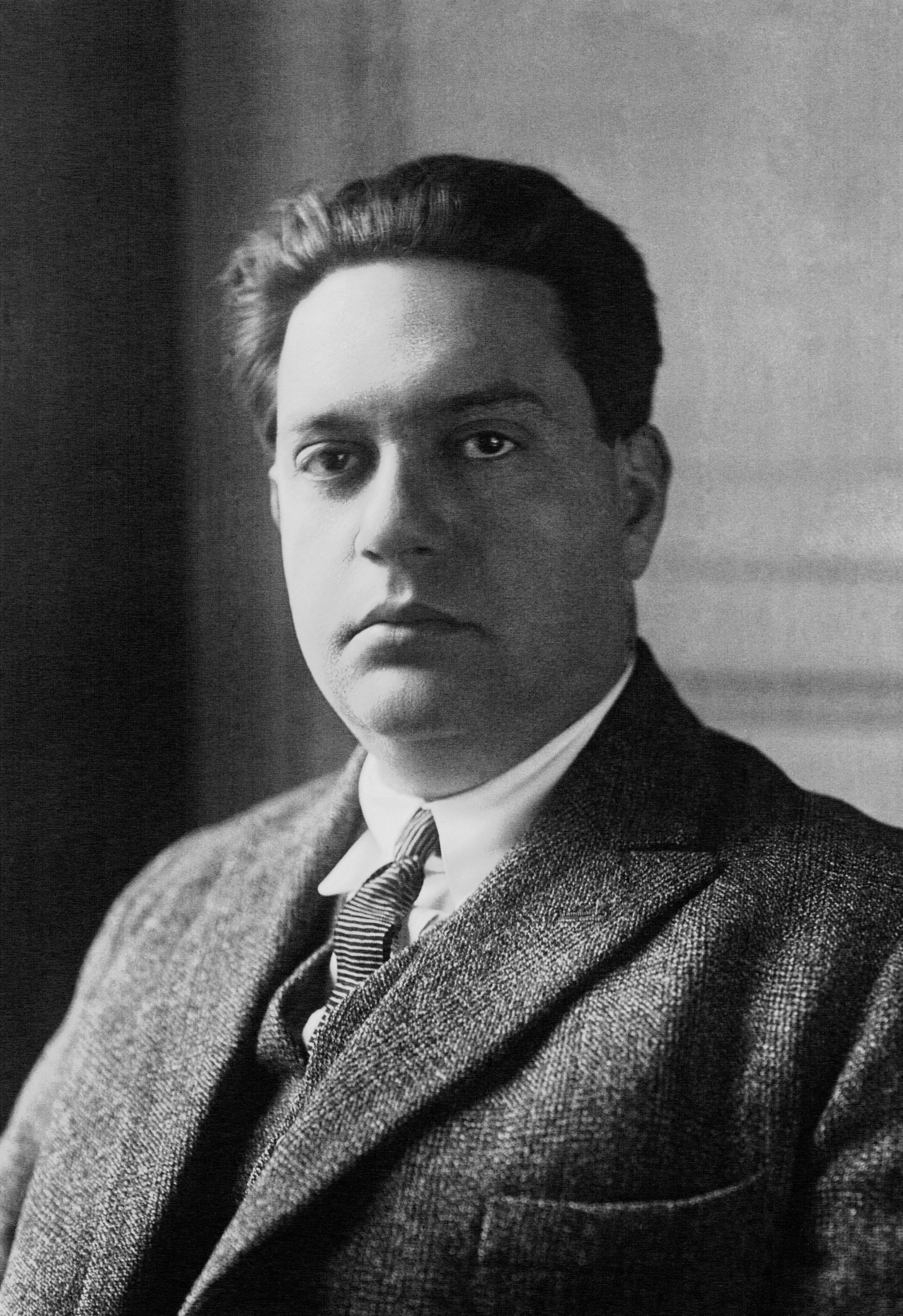
- Milhaud in 1923
- Librettist: Henri Hoppenot
- Language: French
- Based on: Theseus myth
- Premiere: 20 April 1928; Hessisches Staatstheater Wiesbaden

La Délivrance de Thésée (The Deliverance of Theseus) is the final opera in a trilogy of "opéras minute", composed by the French composer Darius Milhaud in 1927 to a libretto by Henri Hoppenot. The first two works in the series are L'Enlèvement d'Europe (The Abduction of Europe) and L'abandon d'Ariane (The Abandonment of Ariadne), and the running time for the complete trilogy is approximated at 28 minutes. La Délivrance is the shortest of the three operas, with a running time recorded as 7 minutes 27 seconds, and when written was generally regarded as the world's shortest opera.

In 1993 La Délivrance was replaced as the world's shortest opera when Sands of Time, by the Welsh composer Peter Reynolds, was premiered in Cardiff, with a running time given as 4 minutes 9 seconds.

== Roles ==
Main roles:

- Aricie (mezzo-soprano)
- Phèdre (soprano)
- Hippolyte (baritone)
- Théramene (baritone)
- Thésée (tenor)

Distant chorus (SATB)

== Plot ==
Setting: The palace of Thésée. The love of Thésée's son Hippolyte for Aricie arouses the jealousy of Phèdre, his stepmother. When he rejects her, Phèdre denounces him to his father, who arranges his death at the hands of a monster. In revenge, Théramene kills Phèdre, and is in turn executed on the orders of Thésée. Aricie comforts Thésée.

== Performance history ==
The first performance of La Délivrance was at Wiesbaden, Germany, on 20 April 1928. Subsequent performances took place at Iowa State University on 8 May 1961 and in New York City on 24 March 1971.

== Recording history ==
La Délivrance has been recorded three times: in 1929 Milhaud with the Pro Musica Ensemble recorded it for Columbia; in 1982 Alexandre Siranossian led the Ensemble Ars Nova in a live performance recorded by Arion; in 1991 Karl Anton Rickenbacher led Capella Cracoviensis, for the Koch Swann label.
