= Mrs Loud (album) =

Studio album by Lorraine Crosby
- Released: 10 November 2008
- Genre: Rock
- Length: 49:02
- Label: Rant n Rave Records, Global Music
- Producer: Lorraine Crosby, Stuart Emerson

Mrs Loud is the debut album by Lorraine Crosby, released under her stage name Mrs Loud in 2008. The album is available for digital download via iTunes or from Lorraine's website.

The album was first self-released by Crosby in 2007 before a signing with Rant n Rave Records in 2008.

== Track listing ==
No.	Title	Length
1.	"Face to Face (With Mrs Loud)"	4:49
2.	"Don't Push Your Luck"	3:26
3.	"I Want You So Bad"	4:29
4.	"The Wind in My Hair"	4:53
5.	"Still in Love with You"	3:59
6.	"If I Have You"	4:13
7.	"A Love That Grows"	4:16
8.	"Sweat"	4:00
9.	"Let It Roll"	3:44
10.	"Last Train to Paradise"	3:59
11.	"Follow Your Heart"	6:02
12.	"I'm So Glad You Came"	1:52

== Personnel ==
- Lorraine Crosby - lead and backing vocals
- The Caffrey Brothers - Backing vocals
- Stuart Emerson - Guitar, bass guitar, keyboards, piano, drum programming, backing vocals
- Paul Smith - Drums
- Lee Harvey - Drums
