= Free Spirit (Bonnie Tyler album) =

Studio album by Bonnie Tyler
- Released: October 1995
- Recorded: 1995
- Studios: Compass Point Studios (Nassau, Bahamas); Comforts Place (Surrey, UK); Sarm Hook End (Berkshire, UK); Parkgate Studios (East Sussex, UK); Westlake Studios (London, UK); Emersong Studios; Westlake Audio and Record Plant (Los Angeles, California); Brooklyn Studios (Hollywood, California); The Hit Factory (New York City, New York).
- Genre: Pop rock
- Length: 75:02
- Label: EastWest
- Producers: Humberto Gatica; Stuart Emerson; David Foster; Simon Franglen; Andy Hill; Christopher Neil; Steven Rinkoff; Jim Steinman; Charles Vasoll

Bonnie Tyler chronology
The Ultimate Collection (1995)	Free Spirit (1995)	All in One Voice (1998)

Singles from Free Spirit
- 1. "Making Love Out of Nothing at All" Released: 2 October 1995 (EU); 2. "You're the One" Released: 1995 (EU); 3. "Two Out of Three Ain't Bad" Released: 1996 (Germany); 4. "Limelight" Released: 1996 (Germany)

Free Spirit is the eleventh studio album by Welsh singer Bonnie Tyler, released in Europe in October 1995, by EastWest Records and in the United States on 26 March 1996 by Atlantic Records. Tyler recorded the album with numerous producers, and it was her first album release in the UK and the US since Hide Your Heart (1988).

The album saw only moderate success in a small number of European countries, peaking highest in Norway at No. 22. Four singles were released in support of the album, with "Making Love (Out of Nothing at All)" narrowly missing the UK Top 40.

== Background and recording ==
In the early 1990s, Tyler released three albums through Hansa Records. With Dieter Bohlen as her primary collaborator, these albums were primarily aimed at the European market. Free Spirit would become Tyler's first album release in the UK and the US since 1988. Tyler signed to EastWest Records in 1994.

Free Spirit features collaborations with an array of producers, including David Foster, Humberto Gatica, Andy Hill, Jeff Lynne, Christopher Neil and Jim Steinman. The tracks were recorded in a number of studios, most notably at Compass Point Studios, Bahamas, and The Hit Factory, New York.

The album reunited Tyler with Steinman to record cover versions of "Two Out of Three Ain't Bad" and "Making Love (Out of Nothing at All)". Tyler described the latter as her "follow-up to "Total Eclipse, thirteen years too late". The track features operatic vocals provided by Tyler's mother, Elsie Hopkins. Tyler stated, "I had a tape of her singing as my nephew played the piano. Steinman got to hear this, and he was so impressed that he decided to sample her voice and use it on the track".

Tyler's cover of "Bridge over Troubled Water" by Simon & Garfunkel features an uncredited guest vocal by Lenny Kravitz, who could not be named due to contractual limitations imposed by his label Virgin Records. "Make It Right Tonight" originally appeared on Gary Chapman's album The Light Inside (1994).

== Release and promotion ==
Free Spirit was first released in Europe on 3 October 1995 through EastWest Records. In the following year, the album was re-issued in Germany with a cover of "Limelight" by The Alan Parsons Project replacing the remix of "Sexual Device". Tyler's version of "Limelight" was included on a compilation album titled Atlanta '96 – The Sound of Winners, released by EastWest in support of the German team competing at the 1996 Summer Olympics in Atlanta, Georgia. Free Spirit was released in the United States on 26 March 1996 through Atlantic Records.

Tyler embarked on a 22-date tour of Germany, Austria and Switzerland in support of the album, beginning in Nuremberg on 1 April and concluding in Hof on 11 May 1996.

In September 2021, Free Spirit was reissued as part of a three-disc box set titled The East West Years 1995–1998 through Cherry Pop.

== Singles ==
Four singles were released from Free Spirit. "Making Love (Out of Nothing At All)" was released as the album's lead single in October 1995, and on 8 January 1996 in the United Kingdom. It peaked at No. 12 and No. 17 on the Dutch Top 40 and Top 100 singles charts respectively, and No. 45 in the UK. In an interview with Night & Day magazine, Tyler expressed her frustration about East West's promotional strategy. "I was gutted about ["Making Love (Out of Nothing at All)"] because I made it with Jim Steinman [...] but it wasn't in the shops. People wanted to buy it, but I don't think they pressed enough copies because all the copies they pressed sold out."

"You're the One" was chosen as the follow-up single, charting at No. 99 in Germany. "Two Out of Three Ain't Bad" was released in Europe and the United States, but failed to chart in both territories. The European release was on a maxi CD with radio edits, while Atlantic issued a 12" vinyl featuring one radio edit and four remixes by house DJ Ralphi Rosario. "Limelight" became the fourth and final single from the album, peaking at No. 76 in Germany.

"Two Out of Three Ain't Bad" was reissued as a digital single on 29 October 2021.

== Critical reception ==
Professional ratings
Review scores
Source	Rating
AllMusic	3/5 stars
Dayton Daily News	2/4 stars
The Morning Call	Unfavourable
Springfield News-Leader	2/4 stars

Free Spirit received mixed reviews from music critics. Writing for Dayton Daily News, Rich Eichhorn described the album as a "dated-sounding hodge-podge of pop, country and disco". Mark Marymont of the Springfield News-Leader noted "Nothing to Do with Love" and "You're the One" as the album's strongest moments, but described "Making Love (Out of Nothing at All)" as "perhaps the most over-produced track of the year". In another negative review, Larry Printz of The Morning Call opined that the use of multiple producers and musical styles "smacks of desperation", describing the album as "mediocre drivel". MusikWoche described Free Spirit as a "diverse, catchy album" with "opulently arranged songs" and "powerful rock and delicate pop sounds".

In a retrospective review for AllMusic, critic Jose F. Promis noted that "Several songs on this album rate about average, but there are several shining moments which should have brought this set, from such an engaging singer, much more attention than the minimal it received". In a review of The East West Years box set for Classic Pop, John Earls described Free Spirit as "a sprawling mess where songs were left to drift far past their natural running time," opining that the album's producers "didn't seem to know what to do with such a gifted singer".

== Commercial performance ==
Free Spirit’s chart performance was fleeting. Despite being Tyler's first album release in the United Kingdom and the United States since 1988, it failed to chart in either territory.

The album fared best in Norway, entering at No. 22 and spending a total of three weeks in the Top 40. Free Spirit charted for only two weeks in both Switzerland and Austria, peaking at No. 39 and No. 43 respectively.

== Track listing ==
Free Spirit — Standard edition
No.	Title	Writer(s)	Producer(s)	Length
1.	"Nothing to Do with Love"	Frankie Miller; Jerry Lynn Williams	Humberto Gatica; Simon Franglen	4:53
2.	"You're the One"	Klaus Meine; Rudolf Schenker	Gatica; Franglen	3:59
3.	"Making Love (Out of Nothing At All)"	Jim Steinman	Steinman; Steven Rinkoff^{[a]}	7:47
4.	"Given It All"	Andy Hill; Alan Darby	Hill	5:44
5.	"What You Got"	Williams	Christopher Neil	5:32
6.	"Bridge over Troubled Water"	Paul Simon	David Foster	4:59
7.	"Time Mends a Broken Heart"	Jeff Lynne; Kiki Dee	Neil	3:30
8.	"Driving Me Wild"	Stuart Emerson	Emerson	5:12
9.	"Sexual Device"	Emerson	Emerson	4:10
10.	"Make It Right Tonight"	Hill	Hill	5:43
11.	"All Night to Know You"	Emerson	Emerson	5:40
12.	"Forget Her"	Paul Millns	Neil	4:13
13.	"Two Out of Three Ain't Bad"	Steinman	Steinman; Rinkoff^{[a]}	8:40
14.	"Sexual Device" (The Vari Mix)	Emerson	Emerson	5:00
Total length:				75:02

Notes

- ^a signifies a co-producer

== Personnel ==
Credits adapted from liner notes.

=== Musicians ===
- Bonnie Tyler – lead vocals
- Simon Franglen – Synclavier programming (1, 2, 6), arrangements (1, 2)
- Jeff Bova – keyboards (3, 13), programming (3, 13), arrangements (3, 13)
- Andy Hill – keyboards (4, 10), guitars (4, 10), bass (4, 10), arrangements (4, 10)
- Steve Pigott – keyboards (5, 7), Hammond organ (5), bass (7), drum programming (7), keyboard programming (12), strings programming (12)
- David Foster – keyboards (6), arrangements (6)
- Stuart Emerson – keyboards (8, 9, 11, 14), guitars (8, 9, 11, 14), bass (8, 9, 11, 14), drums (8, 9, 11, 14), backing vocals (8, 9, 11, 14), arrangements (8, 9, 11, 14)
- Simon Brooks – acoustic piano (11)
- Paul Millns – electric piano (12)
- Michael Thompson – guitars (1, 2, 6)
- Eddie Martinez – guitars (3, 13)
- Alan Darby – guitars (4, 10)
- Clem Clempson – guitars (5, 7)
- Chucho Merchán – bass (5)
- Jimmy Bralower – drum programming (3, 13)
- Graham Broad – drums (4, 10)
- Gary Wallis – drums (5, 7), percussion (12)
- Jim Steinman – arrangements (3, 13)
- Christopher Neil – arrangements (5, 11), backing vocals (7)
- Gene Miller – backing vocals (1, 2)
- David Morgan – backing vocals (1, 2)
- Yvonne Williams – backing vocals (1, 2)
- Glen Burtnik – backing vocals (3)
- Kasim Sulton – backing vocals (3)
- Eric Troyer – backing vocals (3)
- Miriam Stockley – backing vocals (4, 10)
- Chris Thompson – backing vocals (4, 10)
- Alan Carvell – backing vocals (5, 7)
- Lorraine Crosby – backing vocals (8, 9, 11, 14)
- Tawatha Agee – backing vocals (13)
- Robin Clark – backing vocals (13)
- Curtis King – backing vocals (13)
- Fonzi Thornton – backing vocals (13)

=== Technical ===
- Humberto Gatica – engineer (1, 2, 6), mixing (1, 2, 6)
- Felipe Elgueta – engineer (1, 2, 6)
- Simon Franglen – engineer (1, 2)
- Steven Rinkoff – engineer (3, 13)
- Tony Phillips – mixing (3, 13)
- Brian Tench – engineer (4, 10)
- Giles Twigg – engineer (4, 10)
- Stuart Emerson – engineer (8, 9, 11, 14), mixing (8, 9, 11, 14)
- Dan Priest – engineer (9, 11, 14), mixing (9, 11, 14)
- Oswald "Osie" Bowe – assistant engineer (1, 2, 6)
- Duane Hibbard – assistant engineer (1, 2)
- Ronnie Rivera – assistant engineer (1, 2)
- James Saez – assistant engineer (1, 2)
- Robbes Stieglitz – assistant engineer (1, 2)
- Dan Gellert – additional engineer (3, 13)
- Scott Austin – assistant engineer (3, 13)
- Tony Black – assistant engineer (3, 13)
- Kyle Bess – mix assistant (6)
- Alejandro Rodriguez – mix assistant (6)
- Doug Cook – second engineer (9, 11, 14)
- Ted Jensen – mastering at Sterling Sound (New York City, New York) (3, 13)
- Don Ketteler – production coordination (3, 13)
- Charles Vasoll – assistant to Jim Steinman (3, 13)

=== Design ===
- Mainartery – art direction and design
- Paul Cox – cover photography
- Dagmar Wildmann – live photography
- Gillian Shephard – make-up
- Pam Trigg – stylist

== Charts ==
Chart (1995)	Peak position
Austrian Albums (Ö3 Austria)	43
Norwegian Albums (VG-lista)	22
Swiss Albums (Schweizer Hitparade)	39

== Release history ==
Release dates and formats for Free Spirit
Region	Date	Format(s)	Version	Label	Ref.
Europe	October 1995	Cassette; CD	Standard	eastwest	
United Kingdom	5 February 1996	Cassette; CD	Standard	eastwest	
United States	26 March 1996	Cassette; CD	Standard	Atlantic	
Germany	1996	Cassette; CD	Reissue	eastwest	
Various	5 August 2022	Digital download; streaming	Standard	eastwest	
