= Lorraine Crosby =

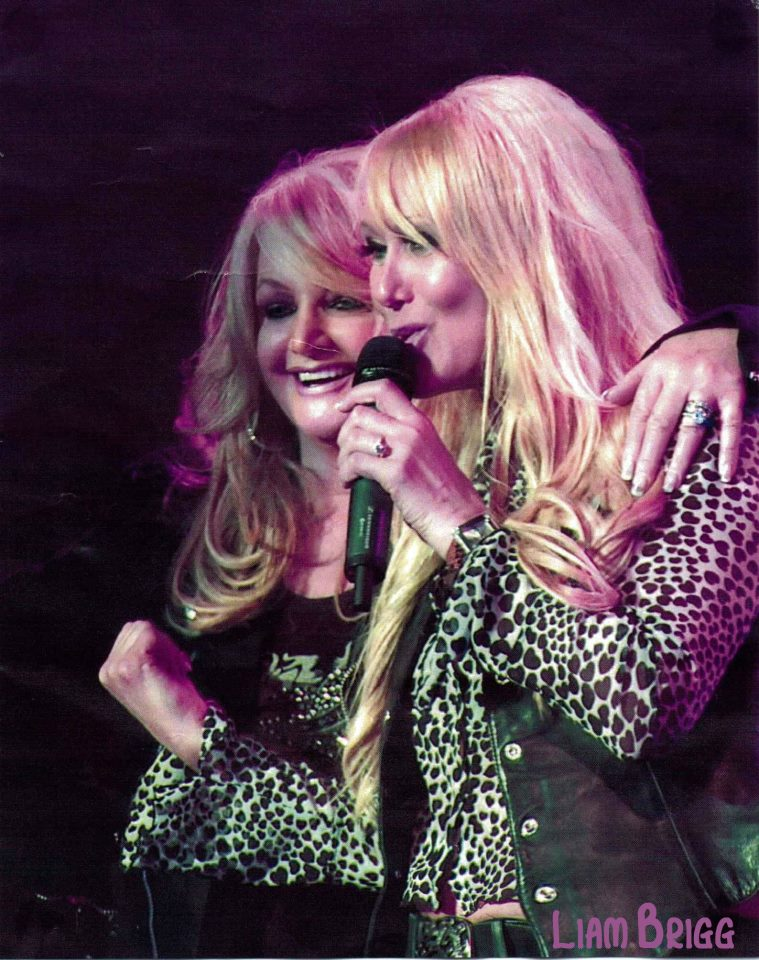
- Crosby (right) performing with Bonnie Tyler at Newcastle City Hall in 2012

Background information
- Also known as: Mrs. Loud
- Born: 27 November 1960 (age 65); Newcastle upon Tyne, England
- Genres: Rock, blues
- Occupations: Singer, songwriter
- Instrument: Vocals
- Website: lorrainecrosby.co.uk

Lorraine Crosby (born 27 November 1960) is an English singer and songwriter. She was the female vocalist on Meat Loaf's 1993 hit single "I'd Do Anything for Love (But I Won't Do That)". Her debut album, Mrs Loud, was released in 2008.

== Early life ==
Crosby was born in Walker, Newcastle upon Tyne. Her father died in a road accident when his car collided with a bus when she was two years old, leaving her mother to raise Lorraine, her two sisters and one brother. She attended Walker Comprehensive school.

== Career ==
In the 1980s, Crosby formed a five-piece band called Foxy, featuring Cliff Dinning on guitar, Ken Gallon on bass, John Lewis on keyboards, and Jim Pearson on drums.

Inspired by Tina Turner, Crosby searched the noticeboard for bands wanting singers at the guitar shop Rock City in Newcastle. After joining several bands she set up a five-piece cabaret band which toured extensively, playing to British and American servicemen throughout the early 1980s.

Back in Newcastle, she met Stuart Emerson, who was looking for a singer for his band. They began writing together, and also became a couple. In the early 1990s, Crosby sent songwriter and producer Jim Steinman some demos of songs she had written with Emerson. Steinman asked to meet them so they decided to move to New York. They then followed Steinman after he moved to Los Angeles. Steinman became their manager and secured them a contract with Meat Loaf's recording label MCA. While visiting the label's recording studios on Sunset Boulevard, Crosby was asked to provide guide vocals for Meat Loaf, who was recording the song "I'd Do Anything for Love (But I Won't Do That)". Cher, Melissa Etheridge and Bonnie Tyler were considered for the role. The song was a commercial success, becoming number one in 28 countries. However, as Crosby had recorded her part as guide vocals, she did not receive any payment for the recording but she receives royalties from PRS, and so the credit "Mrs. Loud" was used on the album. Also, Crosby did not appear in the Michael Bay-directed music video, where model Dana Patrick mimed her vocals. Meat Loaf promoted the single with American vocalist Patti Russo performing the live female vocals of this song at his promotional appearances and concerts. Crosby also sang additional and backing vocals on the songs "Life Is a Lemon and I Want My Money Back", "Objects in the Rear View Mirror May Appear Closer Than They Are", and "Everything Louder Than Everything Else" from the album Bat Out of Hell II: Back into Hell. On these three selections, she was credited under her real name rather than the alias of Mrs. Loud.

In 2005, Crosby recorded a duet with Bonnie Tyler for her album Wings. The track, titled "I'll Stand by You", was written and produced by Stuart Emerson. It was reissued as a charity single in May 2020 to raise funds for the Teenage Cancer Trust. It reached no. 64 on the UK Downloads Chart. Also in 2005, Crosby appeared in the second series of The X Factor, where she performed "You've Got a Friend". After passing the auditions, Crosby was eliminated during the bootcamp round.

Crosby returned to live performances in April 2007. In November 2007, she appeared on the BBC Three television show Most Annoying Pop Songs We Hate to Love discussing the Meat Loaf track "I'd Do Anything for Love (But I Won't Do That)" which featured at No. 76.

In November 2008, Crosby appeared at Newcastle City Hall with special guest Bonnie Tyler to launch her self-produced album entitled Mrs Loud. The concert was later repeated in March 2011. In April 2009, she was also featured on The Justin Lee Collins Show and performed a duet with Justin, singing the Meat Loaf song "Dead Ringer for Love". She also performed "I'd Do Anything for Love" with Tim Healy for Sunday for Sammy in 2012.

Crosby performs in cabaret shows with her band, along with her partner Stuart Emerson.

Crosby appeared in the first round of BBC's second series of The Voice on 6 April 2013.

On 24 April 2017, Crosby released "Feel Alive", a house music collaboration with DJs Christian B and Lavvy Levan .

In May 2020, Crosby re-released her duet with Bonnie Tyler in support of the Teenage Cancer Trust. Retitled "Through Thick and Thin (I'll Stand by You)", the single reached no. 64 on the UK Downloads Chart.

In 2021, Crosby featured as a backing vocalist on "Paradigms" from Sam Fender's album Seventeen Going Under. From January to March 2024, Crosby starred as the "Vampire Queen" on Steve Steinman's Vampires Rock UK stage tour.

== Discography ==
Crosby has provided backing vocals on Bonnie Tyler's albums Free Spirit (1995) and Wings (2005).

=== Studio albums ===
- Mrs Loud (2008)

=== Singles ===
- "I'd Do Anything for Love (But I Won't Do That)" (with Meat Loaf) (1993)
- "Through Thick and Thin (I'll Stand by You)" (with Bonnie Tyler) (2020)

=== Other recordings ===
- "I'll Stand by You" (with Bonnie Tyler) (2005)
- "Double Take" (with Frankie Miller) (2018)
