= You're the One (Bonnie Tyler song) =

Single by Bonnie Tyler

from the album Free Spirit
- Released: 1995
- Genre: Rock
- Length: 3:59
- Label: EastWest Records
- Songwriters: Klaus Meine; Rudolf Schenker
- Producers: Humberto Gatica; Simon Franglen

Bonnie Tyler singles chronology
"Making Love Out of Nothing at All" (1995)	"You're the One" (1995)	"Two Out of Three Ain't Bad" (1995)

"You're the One" is a song recorded by Welsh singer Bonnie Tyler for her eleventh studio album, Free Spirit (1995). It was written by German songwriters Rudolf Schenker and Klaus Meine, both of whom are members of hard rock band Scorpions. The song was produced by Humberto Gatica and Simon Franglen. "You're the One" was released as a single in 1995. It spent one week in the German Top 100, reaching number ninety-nine.

Scorpions recorded a cover of the song for their 1996 album Pure Instinct.

== Track listing ==
- German CD single
1. "You're the One" — 3:59
2. "Sexual Device" — 4:00
3. "What You Got" — 5:32

== Charts ==
Chart (1996)	Peak position
Germany (GfK)	99

== Scorpions cover ==
German hard rock band Scorpions recorded the song under a different title; "Are You the One?". The song featured on their album Pure Instinct (1996).

Personnel

- Klaus Meine-lead vocals
- Rudolf Schenker-acoustic guitar

Additional musicians

- Luke Herzog, Koen van Bael-keyboards
