= Sands of Time (opera) =

Sands of Time is a short opera composed by the Welsh composer Peter Reynolds to a libretto by Simon Rees. Its world premiere, at an outdoor shopping centre in Cardiff on 27 March 1993, was accompanied by a nine-piece band conducted by Carlo Rizzi, director of Welsh National Opera. The performance, sung by soprano Rhian Owen and baritone Dominic Burns, was timed at 4 minutes 9 seconds, and was certified by adjudicators from the Guinness Book of Records as the world's shortest opera, beating the previous record held by Darius Milhaud's Deliverance of Theseus (1928), which lasts just over 7 minutes. A later performance for the BBC reduced the overall time to 3 minutes 34 seconds. In 2019, Sands of Time was performed in a triple bill (with Samuel Barber's A Hand of Bridge and Jacques Offenbach's Le 66) at the Grimeborn Festival, Dalston, London.

== Scenario ==
The opera's two protagonists are Stan and Flo, a married couple who quarrel during breakfast. They are interrupted by a knock on the door from which they learn that they have won a large sum of money on the football pools and are reconciled. The duration of the opera is that required to boil an egg, which is placed in the pan at the start and removed as the opera ends.

== Form ==
Despite its brevity the work, which consists of eight identifiable numbers, contains in condensed form the traditional elements of classical opera: an overture, opening chorus, arias, recitative and a finale. There is a notable influence of 19th century Italian opera in Stan's aria "Down with a splash of cologne", which references the heroic tenor style of Verdi's Il trovatore. In the middle section of the work there is a short, rapid patter-song, reminiscent of Gilbert and Sullivan.

According to Reynolds, "the intention was to create a piece which bore the same relationship to opera as a miniature does to a full-length portrait". The work has not been published, though it has been performed at regular intervals. It was written in a single evening; Reynolds admitted embarrassment over the state of the only copy of the score: "I didn’t produce the neatest score in the world", he said.
