= Silver Birch House =

Silver Birch House is the first play by the British-Turkish playwright Leyla Nazli. The play concerns the life of a peasant family in the Anatolian mountains during the 1960s and 1970s, a turbulent period in modern Turkish history. Silver Birch House was first staged in May 2007 at the Arcola Theatre in Dalston, London, as part of the Orient Express Season. It was directed by the Arcola's founder, Mehmet Ergen, and starred Peter Polycarpou in the role of the family patriarch Haydar. The play received largely positive reviews from London's theatre press.
