= I'd Do Anything for Love (But I Won't Do That) =

1993 single by Meat Loaf

- US retail cassette variant of standard artwork. US CD format was promo-only

Single by Meat Loaf

from the album Bat Out of Hell II: Back into Hell
- B-side: "Back into Hell" (Europe)
- Released: August 23, 1993
- Studio: Ocean Way (Hollywood)
- Genre: Wagnerian rock
- Length: 12:01 (album version); 7:48 (video version); 5:13 (single version)
- Label: MCA; Virgin
- Songwriter: Jim Steinman
- Producer: Jim Steinman

Meat Loaf singles chronology
"Two Out of Three Ain't Bad" (1992)	"I'd Do Anything for Love (But I Won't Do That)" (1993)	"Bat Out of Hell" (1993)

Music video
- "I'd Do Anything for Love (But I Won't Do That)" on YouTube

"I'd Do Anything for Love (But I Won't Do That)" is a song written by Jim Steinman and performed by American rock singer Meat Loaf with additional vocals by Lorraine Crosby. The song was released in August 1993 as the first single from the singer's sixth album, Bat Out of Hell II: Back into Hell (1993). The last six verses feature Crosby, who was credited only as "Mrs. Loud" in the album notes. She does not appear in the accompanying music video, directed by Michael Bay, in which her vocals are lip-synched by Dana Patrick. Meat Loaf promoted the single with American singer Patti Russo, who performed the live vocals at his promo appearances and at his concerts on tour.

The power ballad was a commercial success, reaching number one in 28 countries. The single was certified platinum in the United States and became Meat Loaf's first and only number-one and top ten single on the Billboard Hot 100 and Cash Box Top 100. It also became Meat Loaf's first and only number-one single on the UK Singles Chart, and was the best-selling single of 1993 in the United Kingdom. The song earned Meat Loaf a Grammy Award for Best Rock Vocal Performance, Solo. He also won a Brit Award for best selling single.

== Music and lyrics ==
The timings in this article refer to the original album version. There are many shorter single and radio edits.

The song opens with a guitar played to sound like a revving motorcycle. Roy Bittan's piano begins to play along with the guitars and drums. The vocals begin at the 1:50 point. The opening vocals are accompanied by piano and backing vocals. The song then becomes much louder as the band, predominantly piano, plays the main melody for twenty seconds. An instrumental section follows the first verse and chorus, lasting over 45 seconds, with piano playing the title melody, accompanied by guitar and wordless background vocals by Todd Rundgren, Rory Dodd and Kasim Sulton. The lead vocals recommence with another verse. The phrase "sex, drugs and rock 'n' roll" was changed to "sex and drums and rock and roll" on the recording, although Meat Loaf occasionally sang the original phrase when performing the song live.

The lyrics "I'd do anything for love, but I won't do that" were first used in the song "Getting So Excited" (written by Alan Gruner), recorded by Bonnie Tyler in the album Faster Than the Speed of Night, which was produced by Steinman.

=== Duet coda ===
At the 9:28 point, the song transforms into a duet coda. The structure of the verses remains, but the woman now asks what the man would do. He answers in the affirmative for the first four sections. The song's tone changes for the final two sections, in which the woman, played by Lorraine Crosby on the original recorded version, predicts that the man would eventually do things to upset her and their relationship. Both times, he denies it.

=== Perceived ambiguity of "that" ===
An early episode of the VH1 program Pop-up Video commented, "Exactly what Meat Loaf won't do for love remains a mystery to this day." A reviewer writing for AllMusic commented, "The lyrics build suspense by portraying a romance-consumed lover who pledges to do anything in the name of love except 'that', a mysterious thing that he will not specify." Frank O'day says the lyrics provide "an enlightening example of how listeners project their own thoughts, values, and concerns onto the meaning of the song with misconstrued lyrics."

Meat Loaf said the question, "What is 'that'?" was one of the most common questions he was asked. He felt the message in the lyrics was clear, but Steinman had expected they would cause confusion. In his 1998 VH1 Storytellers special, he explained the lyrics on stage using a blackboard and a pointer.

In each chorus, the singer describes things he would do for love, such as "I'd run right into hell and back", followed by a promise of something he will never do, such as "I'll never forget the way you feel right now." He then declares again that he "would do anything for love, but [he] won't do that." "That" refers to whatever he promised he will never do, making the declaration "I won't do that" a simple repetition of the promise.

At the song's conclusion, the lyrics are more straightforward, where the woman suggests he will abandon her – "... you'll see that it's time to move on", "... you'll be screwing around", to which he replies, "I won't do that."

== Recording ==
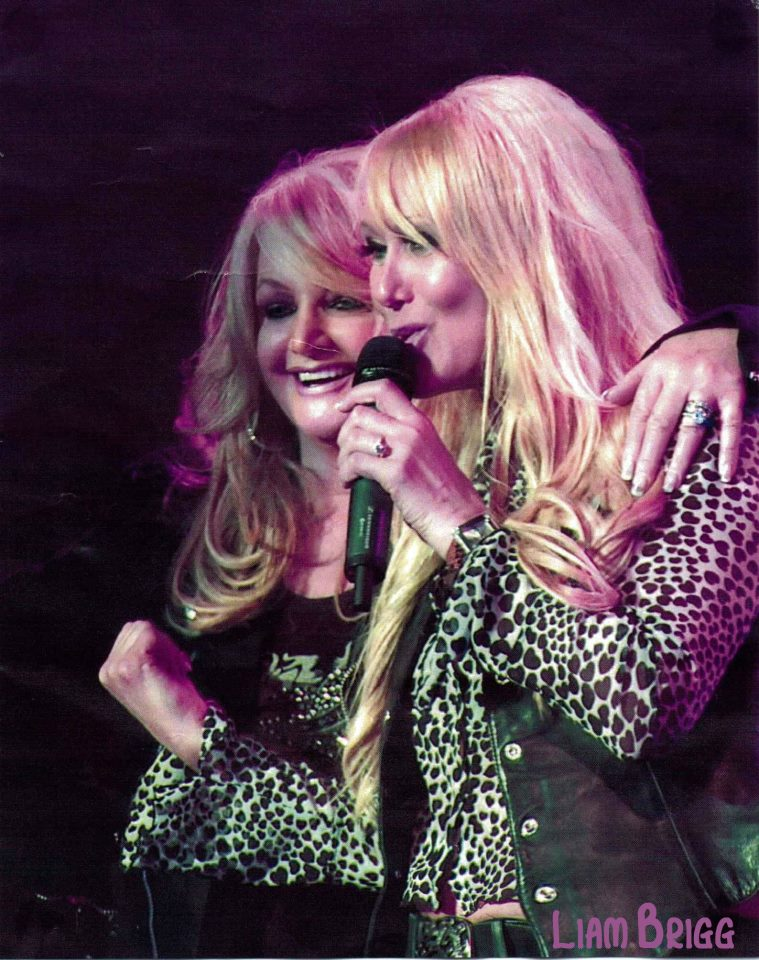
Crosby (right, performing with Bonnie Tyler) provided the female vocals in the song

English singer Lorraine Crosby sang the other part of the duet. She and her partner Stuart Emerson had moved to Los Angeles to work with Steinman, who became their manager and secured them a contract with Meat Loaf's label MCA. While visiting the company's studios on Sunset Boulevard, Crosby was asked to provide guide vocals for Meat Loaf, who was recording the song. Crosby recalls, "In I went and sang it twice and I never thought anything more of it until six months later when I got a phone call saying, 'Would you mind if we used your vocals?'" As Crosby had recorded her part as guide vocals, she received no royalties from the song.

Cher, Melissa Etheridge and Bonnie Tyler had been considered for the role. Tyler, who described Crosby as "a great friend of mine from Newcastle", said: "Meat Loaf was naughty, really: he gave her no acknowledgement on the album but I think her part really made that song."

== Critical reception ==
Critical reaction was mixed. AllMusic said that "Meat Loaf sells the borderline-campy lyrics with a full-throated vocal whose stirring sense of conviction brings out the heart hidden behind the clever phrases." Larry Flick from Billboard magazine wrote that the song "has Mr. Loaf's emotionally charged vocal fronting a mammoth mix (and what sounds like a cast of thousands). Cohort Steinman gives it his all here, providing epic power chords, angelic backing choruses, a romance-laden duet with fellow MCA signee "Mrs. Loud", and anthemic pace changes calculated to raise every lighter in the arena." He also described it as "a glorious exercise in rock'n'roll excess." Alan Jones from Music Week gave it a score of four out of five and named it Pick of the Week, commenting, "This "edited" epic still checks in at nearly eight minutes and includes all the bombast you would expect whenever Meat and Jim Steinman meet. It's way over the top, but that's part of its appeal and, as such, is destined to become a very large hit." Paul Moody from NME remarked that Meat Loaf "indulges in his old favourite trick of adapting a histrionic piano rock plodder to the epic heights of Romeo and Juliet" on the song. Matt Birkbeck from Rolling Stone called it a "guilty pleasure".

British adventurer Bear Grylls cites this song as his inspiration to apply for selection into the SAS: "Enthusiasm and determination count for so much more than skills, brains or qualifications... and all this expressed itself to me through Meatloaf's song!".

== Commercial performance ==
The song reached number one in the charts in 28 countries. In most countries, it was Meat Loaf's first and only number one solo single. It was number one in the US for five weeks and sold over 1.4 million copies there. In the UK, it topped the singles chart for seven weeks, and at seven minutes and 52 seconds, "I'd Do Anything for Love" becoming the longest song on top there since The Beatles' hit "Hey Jude". This was then broken when Oasis released their 1998 single "All Around the World", clocking in at 9 minutes and 38 seconds.

In the United Kingdom, this was the biggest hit of 1993, selling 723,000 copies in 1993. As a result of its success, "Bat Out of Hell" was reissued in the UK, this time reaching the top ten (which it did not achieve on its first release in 1979), meaning Meat Loaf achieved the rare feat of having two singles in the UK top ten at the same time.

Meat Loaf won a Grammy Award for Best Rock Vocal Performance, Solo for the song.

== Music video ==
American film director and producer Michael Bay directed the accompanying music video for "I'd Do Anything for Love (But I Won't Do That)". He also directed the videos for "Objects in the Rear View Mirror May Appear Closer than They Are" and "Rock and Roll Dreams Come Through", also from Bat Out of Hell II. Filming took place in Los Angeles County, California, in July 1993; the opening chase was filmed at Chávez Ravine, with the interior mansion scenes filmed at Greystone Mansion in Beverly Hills. The cinematographer was Daniel Pearl, particularly known for filming The Texas Chain Saw Massacre in 1973. Pearl says that this video "is one of my personal all-time favorite projects... I think the cinematography is pure, and it tells a story about the song."

The video is based on Beauty and the Beast and The Phantom of the Opera. Bob Keen did Meat Loaf's make-up, which took up to two hours to apply. The make-up was designed to be simple and scary, yet "with the ability to make him sympathetic." The shoot went over budget, and was filmed in 90 °F (32 °C) heat, across four days. According to one executive, it "probably had the budget of Four Weddings and a Funeral." The video, which was the abridged seven-minute version of the song rather than the twelve-minute album version, was put into heavy rotation on MTV.

The actress in the video, Dana Patrick, is miming to Crosby's vocals; she did the same for Patti Russo's vocals in the 1995 song "I'd Lie for You (And That's the Truth)". According to the captions aired on Pop-Up Video, Patrick received several offers for record deals after the video aired, from executives who assumed she was actually singing in the video.

=== Synopsis ===
The video's climax: Dana Patrick, as "Beauty", confronts Meat Loaf, as "The Beast"

The story begins with the opening credits saying: "I have travelled across the universe through the years to find her. Sometimes going all the way is just a start." We then see "The Beast" character – a deformed man portrayed by Meat Loaf, on a motorbike being chased by police officers and a helicopter. As the chase continues into night, the Beast passes into a graveyard and into what appears to be a very ornate mausoleum, hiding from his pursuers. He mournfully examines his deformed hands and features. As the officers enter and examine the mausoleum, he crashes through the wall with his motorbike and accidentally knocks down a police officer (whose shotgun goes off): this causes one of the chandeliers on the ceiling to fall and kill the officer.

In desperation, the Beast flees into the nearby woods where he comes across a beautiful woman bathing/cooling herself by a fountain. The woman appears to be in sunny daylight, while the rest of the woods and castle clearly show that it is night-time. The woman looks into a mirror and glimpses the Beast watching her. She turns and he flees leaving only an amulet hanging on a branch. The woman picks it up and pursues him.

As she approaches the castle, the Beast is watching her movements through the reflection of his drink. As she comes into the castle, the Beast hurriedly removes himself. The woman sits in his chair and rests by the fire. The Beast watches her from his hall of mirrors and contemplates approaching her but is ashamed of his appearance. She later is seen having a bath, interspersed with the police officers finding the dead officer's body and preparing to raid the castle. She is later seen trying to sleep while being seduced by three vampy women, while the Beast sits in a chair (a reference to Dracula and the Brides). The Beast leaves the room and, seeing his reflection, begins to smash up the mirrors. The woman, hearing the noise, comes out and follows him into a presumable living room. The Beast observes her from above and levitates the chair she is sitting on.

The Beast, then hearing the officers are near, moves away, and pulls the chair back down, breaking a lamp. The two run away and the woman removes the Beast's hood so she can look at him clearly. She accepts him and caresses his face while they embrace. As they pull away, the Beast is returned to his human form, and the two disappear just before the police catch them. The woman and the transformed Beast finally ride off into the sunrise on his motorbike.

== Track listings ==
The single cover is a cropped version of the painting Leavetaking by fantasy illustrator Michael Whelan, who also painted the Bat Out of Hell II cover.

All tracks are written by Jim Steinman.

UK CD single
No.	Title	Length
1.	"I'd Do Anything for Love (But I Won't Do That)" (video edit)	7:52
2.	"Back into Hell"	2:45
3.	"Everything Louder than Everything Else" (live)	9:18

US 7-inch and cassette single
No.	Title	Length
1.	"I'd Do Anything for Love (But I Won't Do That)" (single edit)	5:09
2.	"I'd Do Anything for Love (But I Won't Do That)" (A Little Bit Longer than the Single edit)	6:36

Australian CD single
No.	Title	Length
1.	"I'd Do Anything for Love (But I Won't Do That)" (video edit)	7:47
2.	"I'd Do Anything for Love (But I Won't Do That)" (Down Under edit)	5:40

== Personnel ==
- Meat Loaf – vocals
- Lorraine Crosby – female lead vocals (as "Mrs. Loud")
- Kasim Sulton, Rory Dodd, Todd Rundgren – backing vocals
- Jeff Bova – synthesizer, programming
- Tim Pierce, Eddie Martinez – guitar
- Steve Buslowe – bass
- Kenny Aronoff – drums
- Roy Bittan – piano

== Charts ==
=== Weekly charts ===
Chart (1993–1994)	Peak position
Australia (ARIA)	1
Austria (Ö3 Austria Top 40)	1
Belgium (Ultratop 50 Flanders)	1
Canada Top Singles (RPM)	1
Canada Adult Contemporary (RPM)	13
Denmark (IFPI)	1
Europe (Eurochart Hot 100)	1
Europe (European Hit Radio)	2
Finland (Suomen virallinen lista)	4
France (SNEP)	4
Germany (GfK)	1
Iceland (Íslenski Listinn Topp 40)	1
Ireland (IRMA)	1
Lithuania (M-1)	1
Netherlands (Dutch Top 40)	1
Netherlands (Single Top 100)	1
New Zealand (Recorded Music NZ)	1
Norway (VG-lista)	1
Sweden (Sverigetopplistan)	1
Switzerland (Schweizer Hitparade)	1
UK Singles (Official Charts)	1
UK Airplay (Music Week)	1
US Billboard Hot 100	1
US Adult Contemporary (Billboard)	9
US Mainstream Rock Airplay (Billboard)	10
US Pop Airplay (Billboard)	2
US Rhythmic Airplay (Billboard)	25
US Cash Box Top 100	1

Chart (2022)	Peak position
Canada Hot 100 (Billboard)	36
Global 200 (Billboard)	49
Hungary (Single Top 40)	30
US Hot Rock & Alternative Songs (Billboard)	7

=== Year-end charts ===
Chart (1993)	Position
Australia (ARIA)	1
Austria (Ö3 Austria Top 40)	20
Belgium (Ultratop)	51
Canada Top Singles (RPM)	10
Europe (Eurochart Hot 100)	16
Germany (Media Control)	17
Iceland (Íslenski Listinn Topp 40)	7
Netherlands (Dutch Top 40)	10
Netherlands (Single Top 100)	6
New Zealand (RIANZ)	6
Sweden (Topplistan)	8
UK Singles (OCC)	1
UK Airplay (Music Week)	4
US Billboard Hot 100	36

Chart (1994)	Position
Austria (Ö3 Austria Top 40)	14
Belgium (Ultratop)	56
Canada Adult Contemporary (RPM)	97
Europe (Eurochart Hot 100)	10
France (SNEP)	43
Germany (Media Control)	20
Sweden (Topplistan)	88
Switzerland (Schweizer Hitparade)	32
US Billboard Hot 100	38
US Adult Contemporary (Billboard)	42
US Cash Box Top 100	32

=== Decade-end charts ===
Chart (1990–1999)	Position
Austria (Ö3 Austria Top 40)	83
Belgium (Ultratop 50 Flanders)	14
Netherlands (Dutch Top 40)	33
US Billboard Hot 100	40

=== All-time charts ===
Chart	Position
Netherlands Love Songs (Dutch Top 40)	34

== Certifications ==
Region	Certification	Certified units/sales
Australia (ARIA)	2× Platinum	140,000^{^}
Austria (IFPI Austria)	Platinum	50,000^{*}
Germany (BVMI)	Platinum	500,000^{^}
Netherlands (NVPI)	Platinum	75,000^{^}
New Zealand (RMNZ)	2× Platinum	60,000^{‡}
Switzerland (IFPI Switzerland)	Gold	25,000^{^}
United Kingdom (BPI)	Platinum	723,000
United States (RIAA)	Platinum	1,000,000^{^}
^{*} Sales figures based on certification alone.^{^} Shipments figures based on certification alone.^{‡} Sales+streaming figures based on certification alone.

== Release history ==
Region	Date	Format(s)	Label(s)	Ref.
Australia	August 23, 1993	CD; cassette	Virgin	
United States	August 31, 1993	7-inch vinyl; cassette	MCA	
United Kingdom	September 27, 1993	7-inch vinyl; 12-inch vinyl; CD; cassette	Virgin	
Japan	December 1, 1993	Mini-CD	Virgin	

== Cover versions ==
A dance cover version by German Eurodance group Jam Tronik reached No. 15 on the Austrian singles chart in 1994.

== Lawsuit ==
A copyright infringement lawsuit was levied against songwriter Jim Steinman and Michael Lee Aday (aka Meat Loaf) by Enclosed Music, claiming that it copied the song "I'd Do Anything For You" by Jon Dunmore Sinclair and Mike Molina. The lawsuit was settled in 2019 for undisclosed terms.
