= Sane and Sound =

Contemporary opera

Sane and Sound is an opera written by the British composer Matt Geer. The work is based on the notebook writings taken from when the composer was suffering from a period of psychosis, following a hospital admission and diagnosis of schizoaffective disorder. It was performed at the Barbican Centre (Milton Court Theatre) in 2019 in collaboration with mental health campaigner Jonny Benjamin MBE. The work had further performances at the Barbican (Culture Mile Festival) and the Arcola Theatre (Grimborn Opera Festival).
