= L'Abandon d'Ariane =

Opera in one act by Darius Milhaud

- Opera by Darius Milhaud
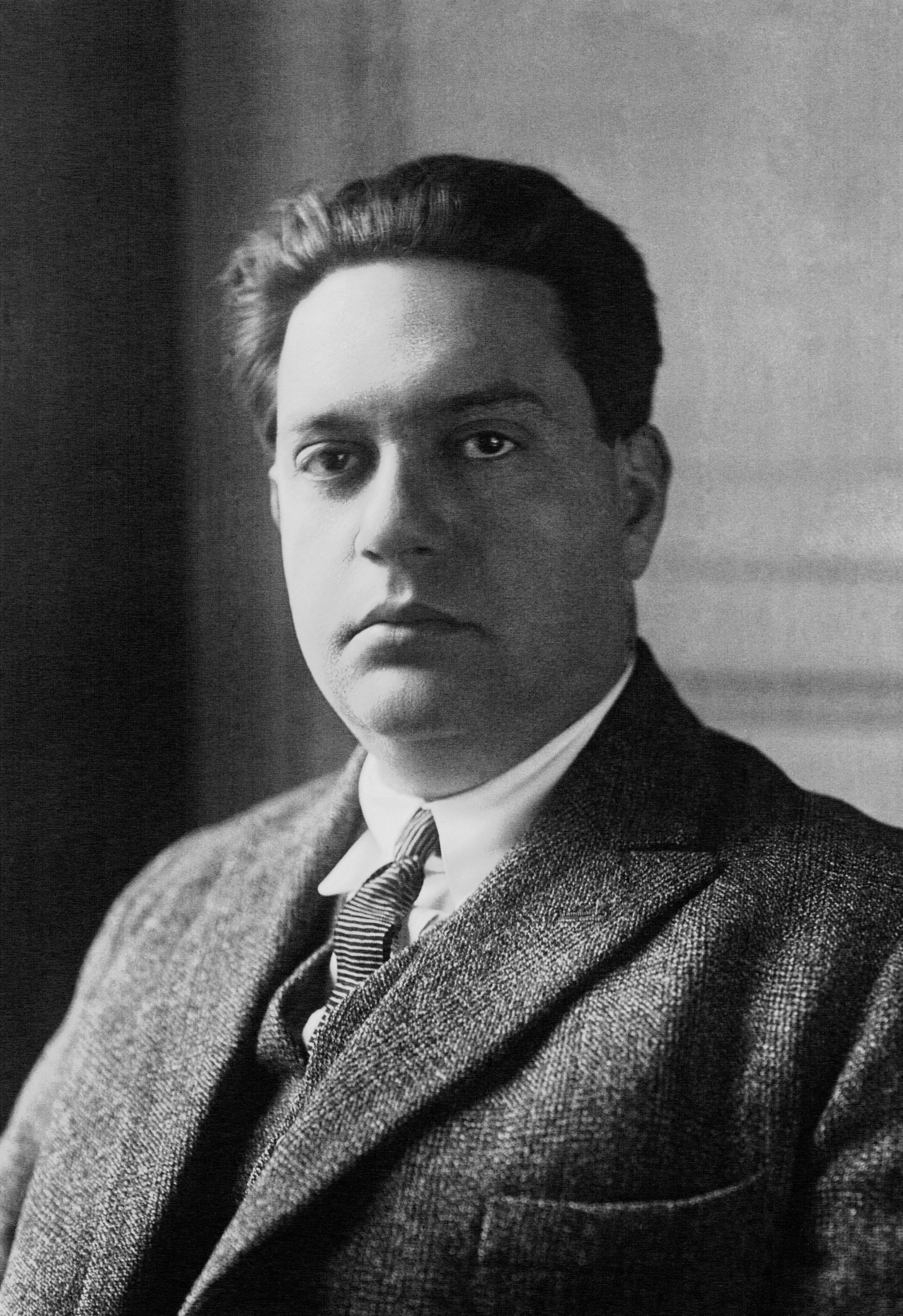
- Milhaud in 1923
- Librettist: Henri Hoppenot
- Language: French
- Based on: Ariadne myth
- Premiere: 20 April 1928; Hessisches Staatstheater Wiesbaden

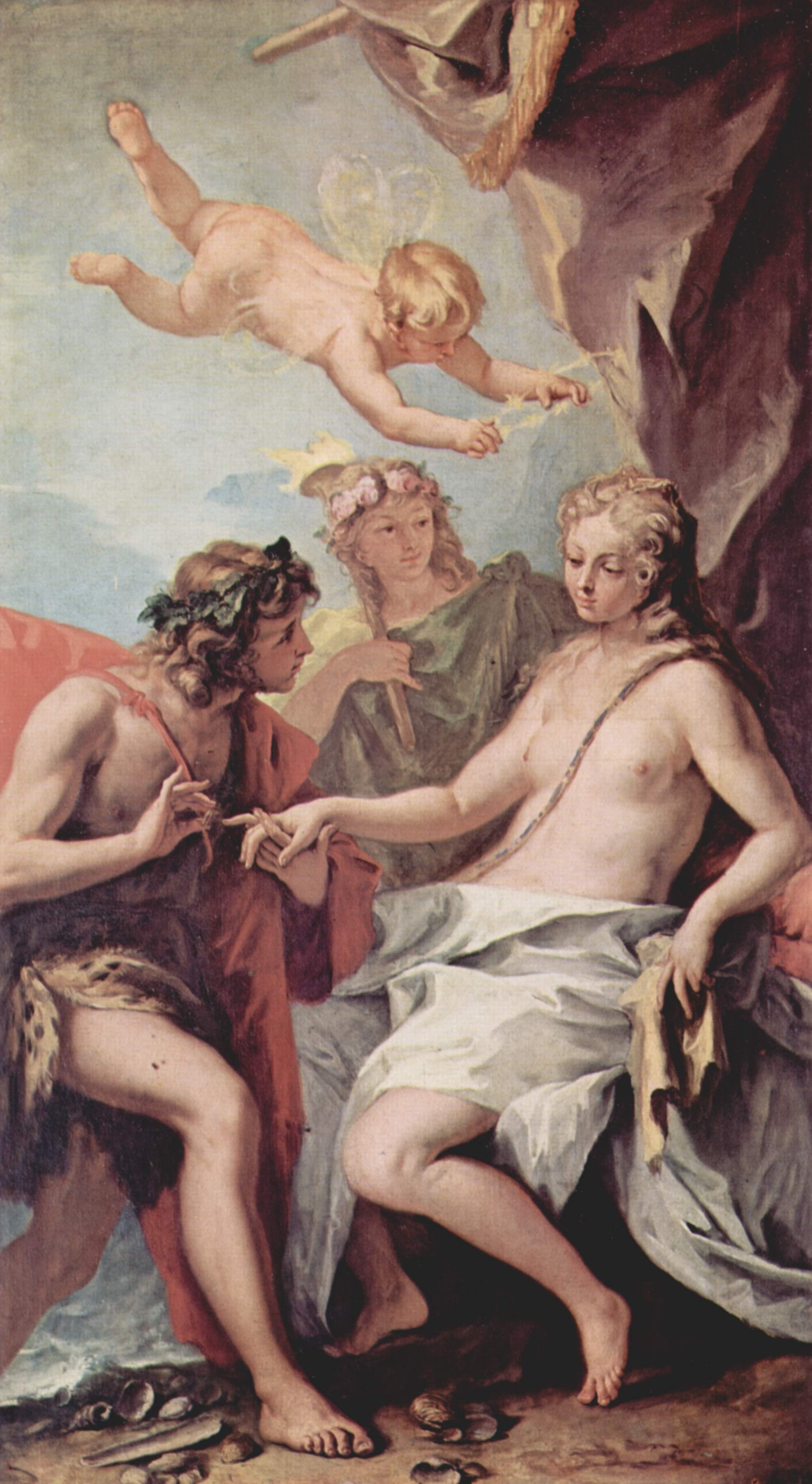
Dionysos and Ariadne, Sebastiano Ricci (c. 1713)

L'Abandon d'Ariane (The Abandonment of Ariane or, in German, Die Verlassene Ariadne), Op. 98, is an opera in one act by Darius Milhaud to a French libretto by Henri Hoppenot, based on Greek mythology. It is the second of three Opéras-Minutes (Mini-Operas) that Milhaud composed. It came between L'Enlèvement d'Europe, Op. 94, and La Délivrance de Thésée, Op. 99, with librettos also by Henri Hoppenot (1891–1977), a French diplomat. The three operas together last about twenty-seven minutes.

== Performance history ==
The first performance of the trilogy - L'Enlèvement d'Europe, L'Abandon d'Ariane and La Délivrance de Thésée - was at the Hessisches Staatstheater Wiesbaden, Germany, on 20 April 1928. These performances were given in a German translation by Rudolph Stephan Hoffmann.

L'Abandon d'Ariane has been recorded several times; however, it is rarely performed live.

== Roles ==
Role	Voice type	Premiere Cast, 20 April 1928 (Conductor: Joseph Rosenstock)
Ariadne, princess of Crete	soprano	
Dionysos, god of wine	baritone	
Phädra, Ariadne's younger sister	soprano	
Theseus, Greek hero	tenor	
Bacchantes, sailors chorus
