= Frankie Miller's Double Take =

Studio album by Frankie Miller
- Released: 30 September 2016
- Label: Universal Music
- Producer: David Mackay

Frankie Miller chronology
Long Way Home (2006)	Frankie Miller's Double Take (2016)

Singles from Frankie Miller's Double Take
- 1. "It Gets Me Blue" Released: 9 August 2016

Frankie Miller's Double Take is the eleventh studio album by Scottish singer-songwriter Frankie Miller. It was released on 30 September 2016 by Universal Music.

== Background ==
After almost thirty years in the music business, Frankie Miller suffered a brain haemorrhage in 1994 which resulted in him being unable to speak or sing.

The album's producer David Mackay began working on the album after Rod Stewart asked if he was in possession of any of Miller's unreleased songs. Mackay contacted Miller's wife, who sent him "two sacks full of demos".

On 12 August 2016, a trailer for the album was published on Miller's Facebook page. In the video, David Mackay states that his idea to invite other artists to feature on the album came from the fact that Miller would not be able to promote the album himself as he cannot perform. "I found more and more artists loved Frankie Miller, and they were just ready to drop everything and come and sing on a track."

== Singles ==
On 9 August 2016, "It Gets Me Blue" with Paul Carrack was released as the lead single.

== Track listing ==
Frankie Miller's Double Take – Standard edition
No.	Title	Length
1.	"Blackmail" (featuring Joe Walsh)	3:04
2.	"Where Do the Guilty Go?" (featuring Elton John and Steve Cropper)	3:33
3.	"Way Past Midnight" (featuring Huey Lewis)	3:42
4.	"True Love" (featuring Bonnie Tyler)	4:11
5.	"Kiss Her for Me" (featuring Rod Stewart and Joe Walsh)	3:53
6.	"Gold Shoes" (featuring Francis Rossi)	3:28
7.	"Sending Me Angels" (featuring Kiki Dee and José Antonio Rodríguez)	4:37
8.	"Jezebel Jones" (featuring Kid Rock and Full House)	3:36
9.	"When It's Rockin'" (featuring Steve Dickinson and Full House)	3:03
10.	"Beginner At the Blues" (featuring Delbert McClinton and Full House)	4:35
11.	"To Be with You Again" (featuring Kim Carnes)	3:57
12.	"I Want to Spend My Life with You" (featuring Willie Nelson)	3:58
13.	"The Ghost" (featuring Tomoyasu Hotei)	4:19
14.	"It Gets Me Blue" (featuring Paul Carrack)	3:13
15.	"Out On the Water" (featuring Stuart Emerson)	3:10
16.	"It's a Long Way Home" (featuring Brian Cadd)	3:38
17.	"I'm Missing You" (featuring John Parr)	3:03
18.	"I Never Want to Lose You" (featuring Lenny Zakatek)	3:28
19.	"I Do"	3:38

== Charts ==
Chart (2016)	Peak position
Scottish Albums (OCC)	11
UK Albums (OCC)	100
