= Mehmet Ergen =

Mehmet Ergen is a Turkish theatre director, producer and entrepreneur, currently based in London Borough of Hackney.

== Biography ==
After completing a nine-month acting course in Turkey, Mehmet decided to become a director. He put an ad in The Stage inviting applicants to join a new theater company, and began putting on plays in pub theaters. Soon after, Ergen co-founded the Southwark Playhouse with Juliet Alderdice, Tom Wilson and Annabelle Harvey-Longmire in 1993. Ergen and his colleagues created the Theater after identifying possible areas in need for an accessible theater, which would provide its surrounding community with a hub for creativity. They converted a disused workshop into a theater space which quickly gained popularity, and by working closely with local teachers, the city council, businesses and government agencies, they were able to develop an innovative, free at source, education program. He was also the theatre's first artistic director between 1993 and 1999.

Mehmet went on to become Associate Producer at the BAC (Battersea Arts Centre) from 1999 to 2001. While there he directed Scott Joplin's Treemonisha, Kurt Weill's Lost in the Stars and had a workshop performance of Marc Blitzstein's The Cradle Will Rock. It was during this period he also founded The Grimeborn opera festival. The artistic director at the time, Tom Morris, asked Ergen to create something new and different from the normal operatic preconceptions in a manner similar to that of Tete-a-Tete of the Riverside Studios. Grimeborn was his creation, an opera and musical theater festival that now runs yearly at Arcola Theatre.

In 2000, Ergen founded Arcola Theatre in the London Borough of Hackney with Leyla Nazli. They converted an old shirt factory while teaching in Dalston, East London, into a fringe venue. Ergen acquired £5,000 of start-up money and sent invitations to all the actors and directors he knew to join him in a paint party. They even recycled cutting tables into benches for the audience.

Ergen's role in the development of London theater has often been noted in the media. Arcola is known for its bold selection of plays; "a melting pot of classic revivals and new work … aspiring theater professionals make a beeline for it prepared to work there for less than a pittance; respectable touring outfits, such as the Oxford Stage Company and Out of Joint, have been queuing up to use its cavernous main space and acquire a bit of its urban cred". Past productions have included Peter Weiss's Marat/Sade and David Farr's version of Crime and Punishment. There were an estimated 30,000 visits in 2003.

== Work in Turkey ==
In Turkey in 2003, Ergen put together a company and directed The Lieutenant of Inishmore. The Turkish company had "a bit of a panic" about going ahead: some of the cast thought they should cancel as terrorists had bombed the city less than a month before. The recent bombs had come very close to the theater district and one of the actors from the country's National Theater was killed while he made his way to do a voice-over at a TV studio.

Ergen was unapologetic about the play's content. However, he did stop the newspaper advertising campaign which was to have run teasing trails "Terror in the Theatre: Two Cats Blown Up". The Turkish Prime Minister appeared on stage, drunk at the time after spending the afternoon drinking raki, appealing to the people to return.

The Kenterler Theater where it was staged had never shown a play containing so much swearing, and never one which even touched on terrorism. Ergen translated it himself, creating for the terrorists a mixture of rural idiom and street slang. At the time Ergen claimed he was likely to end up "either dead or with a sold-out show".

Ergen has submitted a proposal for a social-realist program for theater in Turkey, to the British Council. He is now founder of Yeni Kusak Theatre in Istanbul and runs Turkey's only new writing program Oyun Yaz with the British Council. He established Arcola Istanbul in 2008, known as Talimhane Tiyatrosu (Training Room Theatre).

== Awards ==
- Time Out Award for Outstanding Achievement
- Peter Brook Empty Space Award (twice)
- Time Out Award for Best Fringe Production
- International Theatre Institute award for Excellence in International Theatre
- Angela Carter Award
- Equity Award for Best Studio Theatre

== Director credits at Arcola ==
Sweet Smell of Success by John Guare and Marvin Hamlisch Mare Rider by Leyla Nazlı

- The Painter by Rebecca Lenkiewicz
- The Cradle Will Rock by Marc Blitzstein
- Silver Birch House by Leyla Nazli
- Macbeth by William Shakespeare
- An Enemy of the People by Ibsen
- Seven Deadly Sins by Brecht & Weill
- Release the Beat by J. Johnson/K. Lewkowicz
- The Plebeians Rehearse the Uprising by Günter Grass
- I Can Get It For You Wholesale by Jerome Weidman/Harold Rome
- Jitterbug by Bonnie Greer
- Chasing the Moment by Jack Shepherd

Mehmet directs extensively abroad in Israel, Ireland, Canada and Turkey.

== See also ==
- Arcola Theatre
- Grimeborn
