= Wine Dark Sea (rock symphony) =

Rock symphony by Stephen Caudel

Wine Dark Sea is a large scale orchestral work composed by British composer/guitarist Stephen Caudel for full orchestra with classical and electric guitars supported by a rock section (drums, electric bass, keyboards).

Described by Caudel as a 'symphonic rock poem', the work received its world premiere in 1983 as part of Capital Radio's annual music festival in London. Performed at the Victoria Palace Theatre, the work was conducted by Louis Clark of Hooked on Classics and Electric Light Orchestra fame, with Caudel on guitar. The concert was recorded by Capital Radio and broadcast twice on their Friday Rock Show hosted by Alan Freeman.

Subsequently, Caudel created a special adaptation for album release on the London-based Coda Landscape label, performing all the parts himself using a variety of instruments. His co-producer on the album was Tom Newman (Tubular Bells producer) and the album was released to much critical acclaim including the US music magazine Billboard.

== Citations ==
Taken from composer's website and additional notes in interview.
