= Edel Rhapsody =

The Edel Rhapsody is a musical work written in 1993 by British composer Stephen Caudel. He was commissioned by the North Pennine Orchestra along with Northern Arts to create a new musical composition for the little-known 19th-century instrument the Wagner tuba.

Regarded as a 'world first', Edel Rhapsody is believed this was the first orchestral piece written to feature solo Wagner tuba as the lead instrument. The work received its World Premiere in June 1993 in Carlisle Cathedral in Carlisle, North West England.

Caudel revised the score in 2015 and made a new recording of the work.
