= Stuart Emerson =

- Born: 1963 or 1964 (age 61–62)
- Genre: Rock
- Instrument: Guitar

Stuart Emerson is a background vocalist and session musician playing drums, bass, keyboards and guitar. He has worked on albums for artists including Meat Loaf and Bonnie Tyler.

His first recordings were with NWOBHM band Emerson which included Simon Blewitt (a.k.a. Sam Blue), Stuart Emerson, Brian Emerson, Dru Irving and Jon Sellers. They released their debut single "Something Special" in 1983 on Neat Records without much commercial success. Other members of the band who did not appear on the single include Charles McKenzie and Mick White (later of Samson).

Emerson met singer Lorraine Crosby in Newcastle upon Tyne when he was looking for a singer for his band. They began writing together, and also became a couple. In the early 1990s, Crosby sent songwriter and producer Jim Steinman some demos of songs she had written with Emerson. Steinman asked to meet them, and the couple decided that they would move to New York City to give their careers a boost. They then followed Steinman after he moved to Los Angeles, living in the Magic Hotel, where all of Meat Loaf's band were staying, until they could find somewhere permanent to live. Crosby performed on song "I'd Do Anything for Love (But I Won't Do That)"

He was asked to perform on the album "Frankie Miller's Double Take" and is credited with a duet with Frankie for his production on the track "Out on The water". He also shared backing vocals with his wife on several tracks on the album .

He is currently recording and writing with John Parr and writing and recording with his current wife, Lorraine.

Notable appearances include:

| Year | Artist | Song/Album written/co-written/produced/backing vocal | Charts | Ref |
|---|---|---|---|---|
| 1993 | Meat Loaf | Bat Out of Hell II: Back into Hell (backing vocal) | UK #1, USA #1 | |
| 1995 | Bonnie Tyler | Free Spirit (songwriter/producer) | Swiss #39, Austria #43, Norway #22 | , |
| 2004 | Bonnie Tyler | Simply Believe (songwriter/producer) | France #18, Swiss #35, Belgium #25 | |
| 2004 | Bonnie Tyler, Matthias Reim | Vergiss Es (songwriter) | Germany #64 | |
| 2005 | Bonnie Tyler | Wings (songwriter/backing vocal) | France #133 | |
| 2016 | Frankie Miller | Frankie Miller's Double Take (featuring/presenting) | Scottish #11, UK #100 | , |
