= Stephen Caudel =

- Origin: Sheffield, England, United Kingdom
- Genres: Contemporary classical, jazz, symphonic rock
- Occupation(s): Composer, guitarist
- Years active: 1975–present
- Website: www.stephencaudel.com

Stephen Caudel is a British composer and guitarist. He studied at Leeds College of Music where he took a specialist course in Classical and Jazz music and then moved to London to work as a composer and performer. He has met and worked with a wide range of established artists/musicians over the years including Louis Clark, Art Garfunkel, Stanley Myers and John Williams. Caudel’s creative output to date includes 6 albums (4 solo) and several highly individual orchestral works. Having taken a break from music for several years due to family commitments, he currently lives in Cumbria and has returned to music, actively composing and recording again.

== Musical Influences ==
- Classical: Mahler, Chopin, Tchaikovsky
- Jazz: Gershwin, Django Reinhardt, Stéphane Grappelli (became friends in the late 70s)
- Popular: Beatles, Hendrix

== Orchestral works ==
- 1983 - Wine Dark Sea (Rock Symphony) – large scale classical/rock piece premiered at London's Victoria Palace Theatre with the Wren Orchestra conducted by Louis Clark of "Hooked on Classics" and ELO fame.
- 1985 - Nostalgie (Rhapsody) – for Classical guitar and Chamber Orchestra
- 1993 - The Edel Rhapsody – for solo Wagner Tuba and Orchestra

== Discography ==
Solo albums:

- 1986 - Wine Dark Sea – adaptation of his rock symphony written and premiered in 1983
- 1988 - Bow Of Burning Gold
- 1993 - Impromptu Romance
- 1996 - The Earth In Turquoise – second rock/symphonic project
- 2016 - Reflections In Blue - Guitar & Orchestra

== Other albums ==
- 1982 - Hooked on Classics II - Guest soloist on the Rodrigo Guitar Concerto recorded at London's Abbey Road Studios
- 1995 - Scaramouche – with guitarist Tim Panting

== Performing ==
Toured extensively (Britain, Germany and Japan) including Ronnie Scott’s Jazz Club, Markneukirchen Guitar Festival, Karuizawa Music Festival and 3 nights at London’s Royal Albert Hall as Special Guest of Art Garfunkel.
