= A Hand of Bridge =

Opera by Samuel Barber

- Opera by Samuel Barber
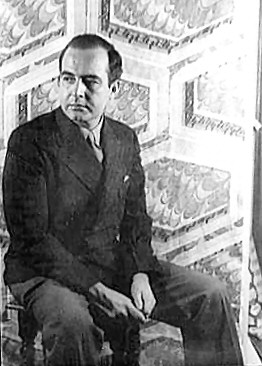
- The composer in 1944
- Librettist: Gian-Carlo Menotti
- Language: English
- Premiere: June 17, 1959; Festival of Two Worlds, Spoleto

A Hand of Bridge, opus 35, is an opera in one act composed by Samuel Barber with libretto by Gian Carlo Menotti, and is possibly the shortest opera that is regularly performed: it lasts about nine minutes. It premiered as a part of Menotti's Festival of Two Worlds in Spoleto on 17 June 1959 at the Teatro Caio Melisso. The United States premiere occurred the next year. The opera consists of two unhappily married couples playing a hand of bridge, during which each character has an arietta in which he or she professes his or her inner desires.

Andy Warhol, a good friend of Barber's, designed the cover for the opera's vocal score.

== Roles ==
Role	Voice type	Premiere Cast, 17 June 1959 (Conductor: Robert Feist)
David, a florid businessman	baritone	René Miville
Geraldine, his middle-aged wife	soprano	Patricia Neway
Bill, a lawyer	tenor	William Lewis
Sally, his wife	contralto	Ella Miville

== Synopsis and musical themes ==
The contract begins with 5♥ played by Bill, after the opponents competed in ♣. After setting the stage for the hand the singers begin, one by one, to express their inner monologues. Each arietta unveils the unfulfilled desires of the individual and their isolation, even among lovers and friends.

In chapter three of her dissertation Musical Narrative in Three One Act Operas with Libretti by Gian Carlo Menotti: A Hand of Bridge, The Telephone, and Introductions and Goodbyes, Elizabeth Lena Smith describes the opera as being separated into the four ariettas that are connected and denoted by the use of the "card theme." This theme is used to create a common thread, separate the ariettas into three sections of equal length, and set mood throughout the scene, reflecting each character's outer "pokerface."

The card theme is heavily jazz-influenced, with swung rhythms and what Smith calls a "quasi-walking bass line." Melodically, the theme is composed of (014) and (015) pitch sets separated into triplets. The construction allows the theme to complement the varying styles of each arietta.

=== Sally ===
Sally, who is frustrated as a result of being dummy ("Once again I'm dummy, forever dummy!") recalls a hat of peacock feathers she saw in Madame Charlotte's shop window that morning and how much she desires to buy it, which is stated repeatedly throughout her arietta,"I want to buy that hat of peacock feathers!" She second guesses herself about wanting the hat by considering two others, a red one with a tortoiseshell rose and a beige with a fuchsia ribbon, before resolving once again that she wants the hat with peacock feathers.

Sally's arietta has a rounded binary form, with the first section characterized by a repetitive eighth note pattern on the words "I want to buy that hat of peacock feathers!" The line is sung over pulsating E♭ and B♭ major triads. The second section shifts to a bi-tonal suggestion of a C♭ major melody over an A♭ major accompaniment, before returning to the original driving eighth note theme.

=== Bill ===
Sally's husband Bill, the lawyer, worries that his wife's "dummy" outburst is a double-entendre and that she may have discovered his affair with another woman named Cymbaline. He describes his mistress as having "geranium scented breath," and blond hair. He continues his soliloquy with contemplating her whereabouts, jealously wondering who she may be with tonight ("Is it Christopher, Oliver, Mortimer, Manfred, Chuck, Tommy, or Dominic?"), and regretting that he is married to Sally rather than her. Bill's arietta ends with Sally saying, "The Queen, you have trumped the Queen!"

Bill's arietta is primarily constructed of scalar triplet figures, creating a romantic waltz that reflects his preoccupation with his mistress, Cymbaline. Toward the closing of his monologue, Bill's forbidden physical desires are expressed by augmented and diminished intervals in his accompaniment on the words, "strangle in the dark!"

Bill is a caricature of one of Barber's neighbors, a business man who hid behind religious pretense.

=== Geraldine ===
Geraldine wonders why Bill is so distracted, deciding that it is neither by his wife, whom she refers to as his "long discarded queen," nor herself, with whom he used to play footsie under the card table. Her inner-monologue is lamentful, asking who loves her and whom she loves. She lists the people she knows do not love her: "the foolish knave of hearts" in reference to Bill, her father, "my stock market husband" in reference to David, and their "football son." She then regrets not having a relationship with her dying mother when she had had the chance, begging her not to die now that she is "learning to love" her.

Geraldine's lament is set with a G major melody with hints of modal mixture, over a B♭ major accompaniment. The only stable moment in the arietta occurs on the subject of Geraldine's ill mother, where the music solidifies on B♭ major and the meter changes from 3/2 to 4/2, before returning to the G major melody.

Geraldine is a direct reference to Barber's sister, Sarah, who had an unstable relationship with their mother.

=== David ===
Finally, David, Geraldine's husband, expresses how unhappy he is with his life, stating that his epitaph will read, "Worked for Mister Pritchett ev'ry day and ev'ry night played bridge with Sally and Bill." He then fantasizes about what he would do if he were as rich or richer than his boss, whom he loathes and envies. He imagines his life in Palm Beach as "the King of Diamonds," with twenty naked girls and boys "attending to [his] pleasures." His fantasies further the idea of sexual experimentation with a reference to "ev'ry known perversion" in a book by Havelock Ellis, which he keeps hidden from his wife behind their copy of Who's Who. In the end he concedes that he could not have that, even if he were rich, and would still play bridge every night with Sally and Bill.

David's arietta is set to a pentatonic melody on the pitches G–A–B–D–E over E and B pedal tones, creating a strong pull towards E minor. The countermelody adds to the sense of exoticism by creating a semi-tone motion with the pitches B and C. Smith concludes that the composition alludes to David's forbidden and suppressed sexual nature.

== Premieres ==
The first performance took place at Menotti's Festival of Two Worlds in Spoleto on 17 June 1959 at the Teatro Caio Melisso, with Robert Feist conducting.

The U.S. premiere occurred the next year on 6 April 1960 in New York at the Mannes College of Music's Fashion Institute of Technology Auditorium, accompanied by the Orchestra of the Mannes College of Music with Carl Bamberger conducting.

== Recordings ==
- Neway, W. Lewis, Maero; Goldschmann, 1960
- Aks, Kittleson, Carney, Muenz; G.Smith, 1991
- Craigie, Williams, Winter, Wall; Marin Alsop, 2004
- Gooch, River, DiBattista, Kravitz; Gil Rose, 2021
