= Peter Reynolds (composer) =

Welsh composer

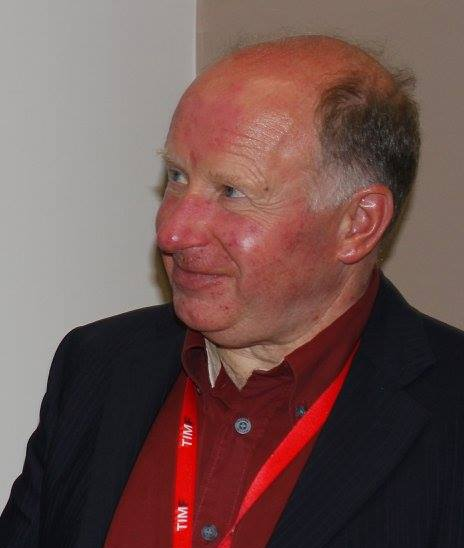
Reynolds in 2016

Peter Reynolds (January 12, 1958 – October 11, 2016) was a Welsh composer known for founding PM Music Ensemble. In addition, he was recognised by Guinness World Records as having written with writer Simon Rees the shortest opera on Earth, Sands of Time; a three-minute and thirty-four second long piece. He died on 11 October 2016 at his home in Cardiff.

== Biography ==
Peter was born to Dorothy and John Reynolds in 1958. Peter studied in Cardiff, Wales, and lived in South Wales, and was the artistic director of the Lower Machen Festival in Monmouthshire from 1998 to 2009. He received bursaries to study at the Dartington International Summer School with Peter Maxwell Davies in 1984, Morton Feldman in 1986, and Gordon Crosse in 1987. Peter gave many composition workshops ranging from schools’ Year 9 through to teaching composition at both undergraduate and post-graduate level at Cardiff's Royal Welsh College of Music & Drama from 2002 - 2016. Peter was the musical director of the Splott Ladies Choir during the 1990s, and he often ran workshops in combination with many different ensembles.

St David's Hall Composition Series

Between September and December 2014, Peter ran a series of composition workshops for young composers once a month on Saturdays at St David's Hall.

Young Composer of Dyfed

Young Composer of Dyfed is one of the great undiscovered secrets of Wales – a scheme in which young composers in Carmarthenshire, Ceredigion and Pembrokeshire work with top, often international, quality players on their compositions. Peter was involved with the scheme adjudicating and mentoring composers since 2006 and was then composer-in-residence from 2010–13, spending each winter working in schools across Dyfed and with ensembles including Piano Circus, the Brodowski Quartet and Farthingale Ensemble. Take a look at their website.

PM Music Ensemble Workshops

PM Music Ensemble is a performing group devoted to contemporary music that Peter set up and ran from 1991. They ran an extensive education programme of composition workshops for various organisations including: Cardiff University School of Music (from 1994) ESTA Composition for School Teachers (2003) Go West Festival (1995) Junior Guildhall School of Music (London) (2003) Late Music Festival (York) (2002) Royal Welsh College of Music & Drama (Composition Dept and Junior Music Dept) (2002–09) Waterford New Music Week, Ireland (Residencies in 2004 & 2007) Vale of Glamorgan Festival (1999–2000)

BBC National Orchestra of Wales

Analysis workshops for A Level students on Schubert's C major Quintet with the Corinthian String Quartet (Cardiff & Bangor, 1997)

Peter Reynolds Composer Studio

In 2017, the Vale of Glamorgan's Composer Studio was named in celebration of Peter Reynolds, who had a long connection with the festival. In the opening dedication, Reynolds was described as a "highly original composer whose works displayed a huge depth of knowledge of musical literature. He was not only highly informed but had a unique artistic perspective as well. These qualities, too, were evident in his work as a teacher, a role he discharged with great gentleness and generosity of spirit."

== Awards ==
- 1986 Michael Tippett Award for Composition,
- 1986 Glanville Jones Award for Outstanding Achievement in Welsh Music (Welsh Music Guild)

== Compositions ==
1980 - 1989

- Lullaby (1981). Mezzo-soprano & piano. Words: W.H Auden
- Borrowed Time (1983–88). Fl, ob, cl, vln, vc, perc & piano
- Shifts (1984). Fl. ob. cl, perc (1 player)
- Unison (1986). 2 clarinets
- Diaphony (1986/7 rev. 1992). Chamber orchestra
- Moonsongs (1987–91). Fl, vln, vc & piano
- Bye, baby bunting (1987–93). String Trio
- Bell Patterns (1988). Solo viola
- String Sextet (1988). 2 vln, 2 va, 2 vc

1990 - 1999

- Dumpe (1990). Viola & piano
- Tango (1993). Piano solo
- Variations (1993). Cello & piano
- The Sands of Time – An Opera in Four Minutes (1993) Soprano and Baritone, chorus of 4 sopranos. flute, 2 oboes, 2 saxophones, bassoon, trumpet, percussion (or with piano accompaniment)
- Serenata I (1994). Flute & guitar
- Serenata II (1994). Oboe & piano
- Old King Cole (1994). Vln, vc, fl, cl, pno
- Turtle Soup (1994). Two-part song for children's voices with piano. Words: Lewis Carroll
- So soft this morning, ours (1995). Violin & piano
- Now Goeth Sun under Wood (1995). Female chorus (SSA). Words: Anon, Medieval
- String Quartet No.1 (1996) 2 vln, vla, vc
- Hold not thy peace and be not still (1997). Fl, vc & pno
- The House of Alcinous (1997). Mezzo-soprano, vc & pno. Words adapted from Homer's Odyssey
- A New Year Carol (1997). Two-part song for children's voices with piano, words Anon.
- Ngòmbí Song (1998). Clarinet & piano
- Near Nicosia, Sicily, July 28, 1943 (1998). Madrigal for soprano, mezzo-soprano, tenor, bass. Words: Geoff Dyer
- Cheap Labour (1999). 2 euphoniums & 2 tubas.
- Serenata III (1999/2003). Strings
- Serenata III (1999). Vln, vc, fl, cl, pno (or harp)

2000 - 2009

- Suite (2000). Solo cello
- Barnacles (2000). Two-part song for children's voices with piano, words by Martin Riley
- Prelude & Finale (from Suite for Cello) (2000). Solo cello
- Urban Songs (2002). Soprano, fl, cl, vc & pno (Also available for soprano with piano accompaniment). Words: Adey Grummet
- Nocturnes for Wind Quintet (2002). Fl, ob, cl, hn & bsn.
- Heartfelt Songs (2004). Soprano, fl, cl, vln, vc & pno. Words: Adey Grummet
- Sometimes there is a hoar frost... (2008)
- Lullaby (2009). For organ, keyboard or any two appropriate instruments
- In One Spot (2009). Piano solo
- Beiliheulog (2009). Fl, vla, guit (or harp)
- Three Wang Wei Songs (2009). Soprano (unaccompanied). Words: Wang Wei

2010-2016

- Far down in the forest (2010). Three solo piano pieces for children based on the tales of Hans Christian Andersen
- The Head of Brass (2010). Narrator & saxophone quartet (sop, alto, ten & bass). Words: Simon Rees
- Canons for the Longest Day (2010). Strings and two off-stage violins
- Only the Stars Remember (2010). Soprano & pno. Words: Maria Garner
- Bayvil (2011). Piano solo
- Adieu to all Alluring Toys (2011). Baritone & pno. Words: Anon.
- Cairn (2011). Harp (also available in a version for soprano saxophone & cello)
- Epithalamion (2011). Piano solo
- footsteps quiet in the shadows (String Quartet No.2) (2012). 2 vln, vla, vc.
- Three Winter Haiku (2012). Mezzo-soprano & piano
- Ecco Mormorar L’onde (2013). Piano solo
- Moon-ark (2013). Solo cello & strings
- Partrishow (2014). fl (db. alto), vln, guit, cb. (instrumentalists double singing bowls)
- Terry Dactyl and the Meteor Seven(2014). A performance work for 4-7 year olds. Narrator & brass trio (tpt, hn, & tbn or tuba). Words: Francesca Kay
- Cippyn (2015). Piano & electronics. Studio recording by Duncan Honeybourne
- Cippyn (2015). Double bass and electronics. Duration: 12’. Film by Aaron J Cooper, director Heledd Wyn Hardy with Ashley John Long
- Penllyn (2016) for piano
- Le Gros Horloge (2016) for clarinet, violin, and piano
