= Bonnie Tyler discography =

Cataloguing of published recordings by Bonnie Tyler

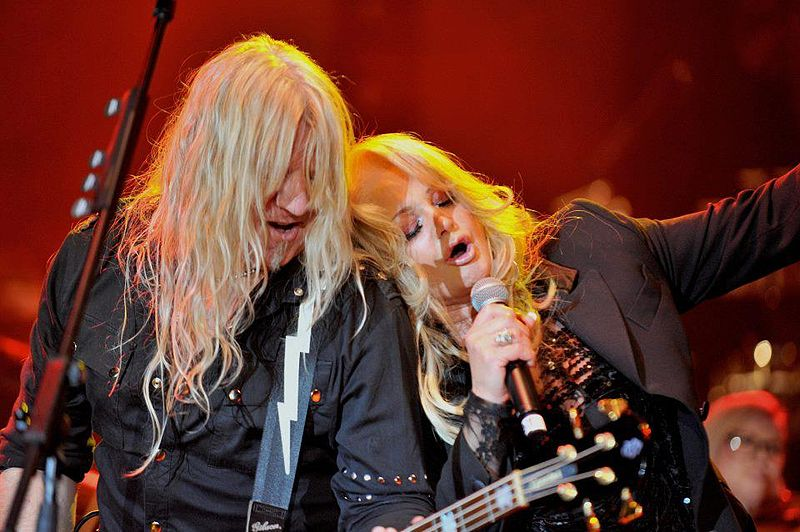
- Tyler performing with Mat Sinner in Germany on the Rock Meets Classic tour
- Studio albums: 18
- Extended plays: 4
- Live albums: 3
- Singles: 86

The discography of the Welsh singer Bonnie Tyler consists of 18 studio albums, three live albums, four extended plays, 83 singles, and several compilation albums.

After signing to RCA Records, Tyler's first single "My! My! Honeycomb" was released in 1976. Her first charting single was "Lost in France", which reached the Top 10 in the UK. Her most successful single with RCA was "It's a Heartache", which became her first hit in America. The song's sales are in excess of six million.

Tyler released four albums with RCA, and while they charted in mainland Europe and US, she would not make it onto the UK Albums Chart until the release of Faster Than the Speed of Night (1983). It contains Tyler's biggest hit record "Total Eclipse of the Heart", which peaked at number one in several countries including the UK and US. Her 1984 single "Holding Out for a Hero" was also a major hit on both sides of the Atlantic, having featured on the soundtrack to the movie Footloose.

In the 1990s, Tyler continued to have commercial success in Europe. She released three albums with Hansa – Bitterblue (1991), which was certified Platinum four times in Norway, Angel Heart (1992), and Silhouette in Red (1993). She then signed with EastWest and released two albums. Free Spirit (1995) became her first UK and US release since the 1980s. Her next album All in One Voice (1998) failed to chart worldwide. Her 2003 bilingual duet "Si demain... (Turn Around)" with Kareen Antonn became a number one hit in France.

Tyler's subsequent albums, Simply Believe and Wings, were both produced in France. Her 2013 Eurovision Song Contest entry "Believe in Me" became Tyler's first charting single in the UK since 1996. In 2019, Tyler released her seventeenth studio album, Between the Earth and the Stars, which peaked at no. 34 in the UK. Her eighteenth album, The Best Is Yet to Come, followed on 26 February 2021.

== Albums ==
=== Studio albums ===
List of studio albums, with selected chart positions, sales figures and certifications
Title	Album details	Peak chart positions									Certifications (sales thresholds)
Title	Album details	UK	AUS	AUT	FRA	GER	NOR	SWE	SWI	US	Certifications (sales thresholds)
The World Starts Tonight	Released: 3 February 1977; Label: RCA, Chrysalis Records; Formats: LP, cassette	—	—	—	—	—	—	2	—	—	—N/a
Natural Force (issued in the US as It's a Heartache)	Released: 12 May 1978; Label: RCA; Formats: LP, cassette	—	60	—	23	—	3	2	—	16	RIAA: Gold; MC: Platinum
Diamond Cut	Released: February 1979; Label: RCA; Formats: LP, cassette	—	95	—	—	—	14	14	—	145	—N/a
Goodbye to the Island	Released: 28 January 1981; Label: RCA; Formats: LP, cassette	—	—	—	—	—	38	—	—	—	—N/a
Faster Than the Speed of Night	Released: 8 April 1983; Label: Columbia; Formats: LP, CD, cassette	1	3	—	12	20	1	3	19	4	BPI: Silver; GLF: Platinum; IFPI NOR: Gold; MC: 2× Platinum; RIAA: Platinum; SNEP: Gold
Secret Dreams and Forbidden Fire	Released: 7 April 1986; Label: Columbia; Formats: LP, CD, cassette	24	—	23	15	24	1	6	3	106	SNEP: Gold
Hide Your Heart (issued in the US as Notes From America)	Released: 9 May 1988; Label: Columbia; Formats: LP, CD, cassette	78	—	—	—	64	2	24	13	—	—N/a
Bitterblue	Released: 11 November 1991; Label: Hansa; Formats: LP, CD, cassette	—	—	1	—	22	1	22	21	—	BVMI: Gold; GLF: Gold; IFPI AUT: Platinum; IFPI NOR: 3× Platinum; IFPI SWI: Gold
Angel Heart	Released: 5 October 1992; Label: Hansa; Formats: LP, CD, cassette	—	—	9	—	28	4	30	14	—	BVMI: Gold; IFPI AUT: Gold; IFPI NOR: Platinum; IFPI SWI: Gold
Silhouette in Red	Released: 18 October 1993; Label: Hansa; Formats: CD, cassette	—	—	25	—	28	6	40	23	—	IFPI NOR: Platinum
Free Spirit	Released: October 1995; Label: EastWest; Formats: CD, cassette	—	—	43	—	—	22	—	39	—	—N/a
All in One Voice	Released: 9 November 1998; Label: EastWest; Formats: CD	—	—	—	—	—	—	—	—	—	—N/a
Heart Strings	Released: 18 March 2003; Label: CMC; Formats: CD, digital download	—	—	32	75	41	29	34	—	—	—N/a
Simply Believe	Released: 13 April 2004; Label: Sony; Formats: CD, digital download	—	—	—	18	—	—	—	35	—	—N/a
Wings	Released: 14 April 2005; Label: Stick Music; Formats: CD, digital download	—	—	—	133	—	—	—	—	—	—N/a
Rocks and Honey	Released: 8 March 2013; Label: ZYX Music; Formats: CD, digital download	52	—	—	— (Note: Rocks and Honey did not enter the Top Albums chart in France, but peaked at number 116 on the Top Albums Téléchargés (album downloads) chart.)	59	—	—	59	—	—N/a
Between the Earth and the Stars	Released: 15 March 2019; Label: earMUSIC; Formats: CD, vinyl, digital download	34	—	24	181	23	—	—	11	—	—N/a
The Best Is Yet to Come	Released: 26 February 2021; Label: earMUSIC; Formats: CD, digital download	— (Note: The Best Is Yet to Come did not enter the UK Albums Chart, but peaked at number 9 on the UK Independent Albums, number 18 on both the Sales and Physical Albums charts, number 28 on the Scottish Albums Chart, and number 35 on the UK Albums Downloads Chart.)	—	47	— (Note: The Best Is Yet to Come did not enter the Top Albums chart in France, but peaked at number 149 on the Albums Physiques (physical albums) chart.)	35	—	—	28	—	—N/a
"—" denotes a recording that did not chart or was not released in that territory.

=== Charted or certified compilations ===
List of compilation albums, with selected chart positions and sale certifications
Title	Album details	Peak chart positions										Certifications
Title	Album details	UK	AUS	AUT	FRA	GER	IRE	NOR	SWE	SWI	US	Certifications
The Hits of Bonnie Tyler	Released: 1978; Label: RCA; Format: Vinyl	—	—	23	5	3	—	1	—	—	—	BVMI: Gold
The Greatest Hits	Released: 1986; Label: Telstar Records; Format: Cassette, vinyl	24	48	20	—	—	—	11	—	—	—	
Heaven & Hell (with Meat Loaf)	Released: 1989; Label: Telstar; Format: CD	84	43	—	—	—	—	—	—	83	—	BPI: Platinum
Here Am I	Released: 1992; Label: BMG; Format: CD	—	—	—	—	—	—	—	—	—	—	BVMI: Gold
The Very Best of Bonnie Tyler	Released: 19 January 1993; Label: Sony; Format: CD	—	—	17	—	3	—	—	—	6	—	BVMI: Platinum
The Best	Released: 15 March 1993; Label: Sony; Format: CD	93	—	—	4	—	—	—	—	—	—	BPI: Silver
The Very Best of Bonnie Tyler Volume 2	Released: 14 February 1994; Label: Sony; Format: CD	—	—	38	—	39	—	—	—	22	—	
The Ultimate Collection	Released: 1995; Label: Sony; Format: CD	—	—	—	—	—	—	—	—	—	—	
Power & Passion: The Very Best of Bonnie Tyler	Released: 23 October 1996; Label: Sony; Format: CD, digital download	—	—	—	—	88	—	—	—	—	—	
Super Hits	Released: 4 May 1999; Label: Legacy; Format: CD, digital download	—	—	—	26	—	—	—	—	—	—	
Greatest Hits	Released: 2 July 2001; Label: Sanctuary; Format: CD	18	—	—	6	—	—	2	9	—	—	BPI: Silver; IFPI NOR: Platinum; IFPI SWE: Gold
Total Eclipse Anthology	Released: 1 February 2002; Label: Sanctuary; Format: CD	—	—	—	36	—	—	—	—	—	—	
From the Heart: Greatest Hits	Released: 7 March 2007; Label: Sony; Format: CD	31	—	—	—	—	2	—	—	—	—	BPI: Silver
Ravishing - The Best of	Released: 2 March 2009; Label: Sony; Format: CD, digital download	— (Note: Ravishing - The Best of did not enter the UK Albums Chart, but peaked at number 27 on the UK Album Downloads Chart.)	—	—	—	—	—	—	—	70	—	
Best of 3 CD	Released: 3 October 2011; Label: Sony; Format: CD, digital download	—	—	—	36	—	—	—	—	—	—	
The Very Best of Bonnie Tyler	Released: 25 September 2015; Label: Union Square Music; Format: CD, digital download	—	—	—	—	—	—	—	—	—	180	
The Ultimate Collection	Released: 2 October 2020; Label: BMG; Format: CD	— (Note: The Ultimate Collection did not enter the UK Albums Chart, but peaked at number 30 on the UK Physical Albums Chart, and number 31 on the UK Albums Sales Chart.)	—	—	—	—	—	—	—	49	—	
"—" denotes the recording failed to chart or was not released, or chart information is not available.

=== Live albums ===
Title	Album details
Bonnie Tyler Live (2005)^{[A]}	Released: 9 July 2006; Label: Stick Music; Formats: CD
Live in Germany 1993^{[B]}	Released: 2 December 2011; Label: ZYX; Formats: CD, CD+DVD
Bonnie Tyler Live Europe Tour 2006-2007^{[C]}	Released: 23 February 2018; Label: Delta Music; Formats: Vinyl
In Berlin	Released: 19 April 2024; Label: earMUSIC; Formats: CD, digital download

- A Selected tracks from Bonnie Tyler Live appeared on two digital compilations titled Bonnie and Bonnie Tyler Live+, which were released by Ba-Ba Music in 2017.
- B The CD+DVD edition was reissued by ZYX in 2013 under the title Live & Lost In France. The album was re-released digitally by Peacock Records in 2016 under the title Live in Germany.
- C Track listing is identical to Tyler's 2006 CD release Bonnie Tyler Live.

== Extended plays ==
Year	EP details
1979	It's a Heartache: Label: RCA
2005	Bonnie Tyler: Label: Stick Music
2011	Total Eclipse of the Heart: Label: Cleopatra Records
2011	4 Hits: Label: Sony

== Singles ==
=== As main artist ===
1970s

List of singles as main artist, with selected chart positions, sales figures and certifications
Title	Year	Peak chart positions										Certifications	Album
Title	Year	UK	AUS	AUT	CAN	GER	IRE	NL	SWE	SWI	US	Certifications	Album
"My! My! Honeycomb"	1976	—	—	—	—	—	—	—	—	—	—		Non-album single
"Lost in France"	1976	9	18	12	—	3	—	20	13	—	—		The World Starts Tonight
"More Than a Lover"	1977	27	—	—	—	44	—	—	—	—	—		The World Starts Tonight
"Heaven"	1977	—	96	—	—	24	—	—	—	—	—		Natural Force
"It's a Heartache"	1977	4	1	3	1	2	3	5	1	3	3 (Note: "It's a Heartache" also made the US Hot Country Singles chart at number 10, and the Easy Listening chart also at number 10.)	ARIA: Gold; BPI: Gold; MC: Gold; RIAA: Gold; SNEP: Platinum	Natural Force
"Here Am I"	1978	—	99	—	—	18	—	—	—	—	—		Natural Force
"Hey Love (It's a Feelin')"	1978	—	—	—	—	—	—	—	—	—	—		Natural Force
"If I Sing You a Love Song"	1978	—	—	—	24	—	—	—	—	—	— (Note: "If I Sing You a Love Song" did not enter the Billboard Hot 100, but peaked at number 3 on the Bubbling Under Hot 100 Singles chart.)		Natural Force
"Louisiana Rain"	1978	—	—	—	—	—	—	—	—	—	—		Diamond Cut
"My Guns Are Loaded"	1979	—	—	—	-	—	—	—	—	—	— (Note: "My Guns Are Loaded" did not enter the Billboard Hot 100, but peaked at number 7 on the Bubbling Under Hot 100 Singles chart and also made the US Hot Country Singles chart at number 86.)		Diamond Cut
"What a Way to Treat My Heart"	1979	—	—	—	—	—	—	—	—	—	—		Diamond Cut
"(The World Is Full of) Married Men"	1979	35	84	—	—	—	—	—	—	—	—		The World Is Full of Married Men Soundtrack
"I Believe in Your Sweet Love"	1979	—	—	—	27	—	—	—	—	—	—		Goodbye to the Island
"Sitting on the Edge of the Ocean"	1979	—	—	—	—	—	—	—	—	—	—		Goodbye to the Island

1980s

Title	Year	Peak chart positions										Certifications	Album
Title	Year	UK	AUS	AUT	CAN	GER	IRE	NL	SWE	SWI	US	Certifications	Album
"I'm Just a Woman"	1980	—	—	—	—	—	—	—	—	—	—		Goodbye to the Island
"Goodbye to the Island"	1980	—	—	—	—	—	—	—	—	—	—		Goodbye to the Island
"Total Eclipse of the Heart"	1983	1	1	—	1	16	1	18	3	3	1	ARIA: 4× Platinum; BPI: 2× Platinum; BVMI: Platinum; MC: Platinum; RIAA: Platinum; SNEP: Gold	Faster Than the Speed of Night
"Faster Than the Speed of Night"	1983	43	—	—	—	—	17	—	—	—	—		Faster Than the Speed of Night
"Have You Ever Seen the Rain?"	1983	47	69	—	—	63	13	—	—	—	—		Faster Than the Speed of Night
"Straight from the Heart"	1983	—	—	—	—	—	—	—	—	—	—		Faster Than the Speed of Night
"Take Me Back"	1983	—	—	—	—	—	—	—	—	—	46		Faster Than the Speed of Night
"Getting So Excited"	1984	85	—	—	—	—	—	—	—	—	—		Faster Than the Speed of Night
"A Rockin' Good Way (to Mess Around and Fall in Love)" (with Shakin' Stevens)	1984	5	21	9	—	22	1	8	11	10	—		The Bop Won't Stop
"Holding Out for a Hero"	1984	2	44	19	19	19	1	—	19	—	34	BPI: 2× Platinum; BVMI: Gold	Footloose Soundtrack
"Here She Comes"	1984	98	—	13	76	43	—	—	—	—	76		Metropolis Soundtrack
"Loving You's a Dirty Job but Somebody's Gotta Do It" (with Todd Rundgren)	1985	73	—	—	—	41	—	—	—	24	—		Secret Dreams and Forbidden Fire
"If You Were a Woman (And I Was a Man)"	1986	78	77	—	87	36	—	—	—	16	77		Secret Dreams and Forbidden Fire
"Band of Gold"	1986	81	—	—	—	—	—	—	—	—	—		Secret Dreams and Forbidden Fire
"No Way to Treat a Lady"	1986	—	—	—	—	—	—	—	—	—	—		Secret Dreams and Forbidden Fire
"Rebel Without a Clue"	1986	—	—	—	—	—	—	—	—	—	—		Secret Dreams and Forbidden Fire
"It's Not Easy"	1986	—	—	—	—	—	—	—	—	—	—		It's a Live-In World
"Sem Limites pra Sonhar (Reaching for the Infinite Heart)" (with Fábio Jr.)	1986	—	—	—	—	—	—	—	—	—	—		Sem Limites Pra Sonhar
"Lovers Again"	1987	—	—	—	—	—	—	—	—	—	—		Secret Dreams and Forbidden Fire
"Islands" (with Mike Oldfield)	1987	100	—	—	—	41	—	—	—	22	—		Islands
"The Best"	1988	95	—	—	—	—	—	—	—	—	—		Hide Your Heart
"Hide Your Heart"	1988	—	—	—	—	—	—	—	—	—	—		Hide Your Heart
"Save Up All Your Tears"	1988	—	—	—	—	—	—	—	—	—	—		Hide Your Heart
"Don't Turn Around"	1988	—	—	—	—	—	—	—	—	—	—		Hide Your Heart
"Notes from America"	1989	—	—	—	—	—	—	—	—	—	—		Hide Your Heart
"Merry Christmas"	1989	—	—	—	—	—	—	—	—	—	—		3615 code Père Noël Soundtrack

1990s

Title	Year	Peak chart positions					Album
Title	Year	UK	AUT	GER	NL	NOR	Album
"Breakout"	1990	—	—	—	—	—	Fire, Ice, and Dynamite Soundtrack
"Bitterblue"	1991	—	5	17	—	2	Bitterblue
"Against the Wind"	1991	—	13	36	—	—	Bitterblue
"Where Were You"	1992	—	—	—	—	—	Bitterblue
"Fools Lullaby"	1992	—	17	29	—	6	Angel Heart
"Call Me"	1992	—	—	86	—	—	Angel Heart
"God Gave Love to You"	1992	—	—	—	—	—	Angel Heart
"Sally Comes Around"	1993	—	—	76	—	—	Silhouette in Red
"From the Bottom of My Lonely Heart"	1993	—	—	—	—	—	Silhouette in Red
"You Are So Beautiful"	1993	—	—	—	—	—	Silhouette in Red
"Stay"	1993	—	—	—	—	—	Silhouette in Red
"Say Goodbye"	1994	—	—	—	—	—	Asterix Conquers America Soundtrack
"Back Home"	1994	—	—	—	—	—	Comeback Single Collection 90-94
"Making Love Out of Nothing at All"	1995	45	—	—	17	—	Free Spirit
"You're the One"	1995	—	—	99	—	—	Free Spirit
"Two Out of Three Ain't Bad"	1995	—	—	—	—	—	Free Spirit
"Limelight"	1996	—	—	76	—	—	Free Spirit
"He's the King"	1997	—	—	95	—	—	All in One Voice
"Heaven"	1998	—	—	—	—	—	All in One Voice

2000s–2020s

Title	Year	Peak chart positions				Certifications	Album
Title	Year	UK	FRA	GER	SWI	Certifications	Album
"Amazed"	2003	—	—	—	—		Heart Strings
"Against All Odds (Take a Look at Me Now)"	2003	—	—	—	—		Heart Strings
"Learning to Fly"	2003	—	—	—	—		Heart Strings
"Si demain... (Turn Around)"	2003	—	1	—	7	SNEP: Gold	Simply Believe
"Si tout s'arrête (It's a Heartache)"	2004	—	12	—	25		Simply Believe
"Vergiß Es (Forget It)"	2004	—	—	64	—		Deja Vu: Das Beste Von Matthias Reim
"Louise"	2005	—	—	—	—		Wings
"Total Eclipse of the Heart" (featuring BabyPinkStar)	2007	— (Note: "Total Eclipse of the Heart did not enter the UK Singles Chart, but peaked at number 40 on the UK Indie Singles Chart.)	—	—	—		Non-album singles
"Making Love Out of Nothing at All" (featuring Matt Pétrin)	2010	—	—	—	—		Non-album singles
"Something Going On" (with Wayne Warner)	2010	—	—	—	—		Non-album singles
"Amour Éternel (Eternal Flame)" (with Laura Zen)	2011	—	—	—	—		Best Of 3 CD
"Believe in Me"	2013	93	—	—	—		Rocks and Honey
"This Is Gonna Hurt"	2013	—	—	—	—		Rocks and Honey
"Love Is the Knife"	2013	—	—	—	—		Rocks and Honey
"Love's Holding On" (with Axel Rudi Pell)	2017	—	—	—	—		The Ballads V
"Hold On"	2019	—	—	—	—		Between the Earth and the Stars
"Through Thick and Thin (I'll Stand by You)" (with Lorraine Crosby)	2020	— (Note: "Through Thick and Thin (I'll Stand by You)" did not enter the UK Singles Chart, but peaked at number 64 on the UK Downloads Chart.)	—	—	—		Non-album single
"When the Lights Go Down"	2020	—	—	—	—		The Best Is Yet to Come
"The Best Is Yet to Come"	2021	—	—	—	—		The Best Is Yet to Come
"Dreams Are Not Enough"	2021	—	—	—	—		The Best Is Yet to Come
"Into the Sunset" (with Mike Batt)	2022	—	—	—	—		Non-album singles
"Total Eclipse of the Heart" (Full Moon Remix)	2023	—	—	—	—		Non-album singles
"Faster Than the Speed of Night" (Live in Berlin)	2024	—	—	—	—		In Berlin
"Let's Go Crazy Tonight" (Live in Berlin)	2024	—	—	—	—		In Berlin
"Bad for Loving You" (Live in Berlin)	2024	—	—	—	—		In Berlin
"The Best" (Live in Berlin)	2024	—	—	—	—		In Berlin
"Older" (Live in Berlin)	2024	—	—	—	—		In Berlin
"Yes I Can"	2025	—	—	—	—		Non-album singles
"Together" (with David Guetta and Hypaton)	2025	— (Note: "Together" did not enter the UK Singles Chart, but peaked at number 74 on the UK Singles Downloads Chart, and number 78 on the UK Singles Sales Chart.)	60	—	—	SNEP: Platinum	Non-album singles
"Only Love"	2026	—	—	—	—		Non-album singles
"One World One Home"	2026	—	—	—	—		Non-album singles
"Love Light and Peace"	2026	—	—	—	—		
"—" denotes a recording that did not chart or was not released in that territory.

=== Charity singles ===
Year	Single	Chart position (United Kingdom)
1981	"Sayonara Tokyo" (Japan promo)	-
1986	"It's a Live-In World" (The Anti-Heroin Project)	142
1987	"Let It Be" (Ferry Aid)	1
1990	"Sailing" (Rock Against Repatriation)	89

== Other album appearances ==
=== Soundtracks ===
Title	Year	Album	Notes
"It's a Heartache"	1978	Te Contei? (Trilha Internacional Da Novela)	Brazil Soap Opera
"Married Men"	1979	The World Is Full of Married Men soundtrack	—
"Holding Out for a Hero"	1984	Footloose: Original Soundtrack of the Paramount Motion Picture	—
"Here She Comes"	1984	Metropolis - Original Motion Picture Soundtrack	—
"Matter of the Heart"	1986	The Wraith soundtrack	—
"Here's your arsenic, dear"	1988	Under Milk Wood	Radio drama. Tyler voiced the part of Polly Garter
"All the women are out this morning"	1988	Under Milk Wood	Radio drama. Tyler voiced the part of Polly Garter
"Polly Garter: I loved a man"	1988	Under Milk Wood	Radio drama. Tyler voiced the part of Polly Garter
"And Gossamer Beynon, schoolteacher, spoon-stirred and quivering"	1988	Under Milk Wood	Radio drama. Tyler voiced the part of Polly Garter
"Now when farmers' boys on the first fair day"	1988	Under Milk Wood	Radio drama. Tyler voiced the part of Polly Garter
"But I always think as we tumble into bed"	1988	Under Milk Wood	Radio drama. Tyler voiced the part of Polly Garter
"Into the Sunset"	1990	The Dreamstone soundtrack	Bonnie Tyler and Mike Batt
"Breakout"	1990	Fire, Ice and Dynamite soundtrack	–
"Merry Christmas"	1990	3615 code Père Noël (Bande Originale du Film de René Manzor)	—
"Race to the Fire", "Against the Wind"	1992	Zorc – Der Mann ohne Grenzen soundtrack	—
"Keep Your Love Alive"	1992	Herr Ober! soundtrack	—
"Fire in My Soul"	1994	Die Stadtindianer (Original Soundtrack der ZDF-Serie)	—
"You Are So Beautiful"	1994	Drei zum Verlieben - Der Soundtrack zur RTL-Serie	—
"Say Goodbye"	1994	Asterix Conquers America soundtrack	—
"He's the King"	1998	The King of St. Pauli soundtrack	—
"You Are a Woman"	1998	The King of St. Pauli soundtrack	—
"Holding Out for a Hero", "Total Eclipse of the Heart"	2001	Bandits (Motion Picture Soundtrack)	–
"Total Eclipse of the Heart"	2004	Thunderstruck (Original Motion Picture Soundtrack)	–
"Holding Out for a Hero"	2008	The Book Of Lies Companion Soundtrack	–
"Total Eclipse of the Heart"	2018	The Strangers: Prey at Night (Original Motion Picture Soundtrack)	–

=== Various artist compilation albums ===
Title	Year	Album	Notes
"Total Eclipse of the Heart"	1983	Now That's What I Call Music	–
"Tyre Tracks and Broken Hearts"	1998	Whistle Down the Wind	–
"A Kiss Is a Terrible Thing to Waste"	1998	Whistle Down the Wind	Guest vocals
"The Sun Comes Up, the Sun Goes Down"	1999	Two Days Later with Jools Holland	Bonnie Tyler and Paul Carrack
"Is Anybody There?"	1999	Return to the Centre of the Earth	–
"It's a Heartache"	2001	Night of the Proms	Live vocals
"It's a Heartache"	2002	Night of the Proms	Live vocals
"Tears"	2003	A Tribute to Frankie Miller	Bonnie Tyler and Frankie Miller
"It's Not Easy"	2005	Rock Masters: Hooked on Love	–
"It's Not Easy"	2005	Pop Masters: Raise the World	–
"I Don't Know How to Love Him"	2007	Over the Rainbow	–
"Cappuccino Girls"	2010	Cappuccino Girls - Songs from the Musical	–

=== Guest appearances ===
List of non-single guest appearances on releases by other artists, showing year released and album name
Title	Year	Other artist(s)	Album	Notes
"When Love Attacks"	1983	Rick Derringer	Good Dirty Fun	—
"Perfection"	1987	Cher	Cher	Featured vocals, also featuring Darlene Love
"Emotional Fire"	1989	Cher	Heart of Stone	Backing vocals, also featuring Michael Bolton
"The Desert Is In Your Heart"	1992	Sophia Arvaniti	Parafora	Duet
"Prizefighters"	2000	Steve Hackett	Feedback 86	—
"Tables Turn"	2002	Mal Pope	The Ring	—
"Loving You Means Leaving You"	2003	Gary Pickford-Hopkins	GPH	Written by Pickford-Hopkins and Tyler
"Total Eclipse of the Heart"	2004	Peter Brocklehurst	For You	—
"Total Eclipse of the Heart"	2009	Only Men Aloud!	Band of Brothers	—
"Die Wilden Tränen (Salty Rain)"	2010	Matthias Reim	Sieben Leben	—
"Nothing's Gonna Stop Us Now"	2010	Albert Hammond	Legend	—
"Miserere"	2014	Rhydian Roberts	One Day like This	—
"Hold Out Your Heart"	2014	Mister John	Smile	—
"Fortune"	2014	Spike	100% Pure Frankie Miller	—
"True Love"	2016	Frankie Miller	Frankie Miller's Double Take	—
"Love's Holding On"	2017	Axel Rudi Pell	The Ballads V	—
"It's a Heartache"	2020	Ben Zucker	Wer sagt das?! Zugabe!	Live vocals
"Taking Control"	2020	Cliff Richard	Music... The Air That I Breathe	—
"Total Eclipse of the Heart"	2022	Alex Christensen and the Berlin Orchestra	Classical 80s Dance	vocals

== See also ==
- List of awards and nominations received by Bonnie Tyler
