= Best of 3 CD =

Compilation album by Bonnie Tyler
- Released: 26 September 2011
- Genre: Pop rock
- Length: 3:35:17
- Label: Sony

Bonnie Tyler chronology
| From the Heart: Greatest Hits (2007) | Best of 3 CD (2011) | Live in Germany 1993 (2011) |

Singles from Best of 3 CD
- 1. "Amour Éternel (Eternal Flame)" Released: 29 August 2011

Best of 3 CD is a compilation album by Welsh singer Bonnie Tyler. It was released in 2011 by Sony. The album features three CDs including some of her early hit songs, and selections from recent albums Simply Believe (2004), Wings (2005) and Bonnie Tyler Live (2006).

The compilation features three previously unreleased tracks, including a bilingual version of the Bangles' "Eternal Flame" with French singer Laura Zen which became the album's lead single.

== Release and promotion ==
"Amour Éternel (Eternal Flame)" was released to commercial radio on 29 August 2011 and reached no. 250 on the French Airplay chart. Tyler and Zen performed the song on the French TV show Génération 90 broadcast by TF1 on 24 September 2011. Tyler later appeared on Les Grands du rire for an interview broadcast by France 3 on 10 December 2011.

Best of 3 CD was first released to digital platforms on 26 September 2011, before receiving a physical release on 3 October 2011.

== Critical reception ==
In an unrated review for AllMusic, Jon O'Brien noted the compilation's "generous 53 tracks" which offer a "comprehensive overview of Welsh rock songstress Bonnie Tyler's impressive 34-year career".

== Commercial performance ==
Best of 3 CD entered the French Albums chart at no. 36, its peak position, and spent a total of five weeks on the chart. Best of 3 CD peaked at no. 6 on the French Compilation Albums chart. The compilation also charted in French-speaking Belgian territory Wallonia. It spent three weeks on the Wallonian Ultratop 200 Albums chart, entering at no. 48, its peak position. The compilation also spent one week on the Wallonia Heatseekers Top 20 Albums at no. 10.

== Track listing ==
Disc 1
| No. | Title | Writer(s) | Length |
|---|---|---|---|
| 1. | "Amour Éternel (Eternal Flame)" (with Laura Zen) | Susanna Hoffs; Tom Kelly; Billy Steinberg; Dominique Gorse^{[a]} | 3:25 |
| 2. | "Total Eclipse of the Heart" (Single Version) | Jim Steinman | 4:29 |
| 3. | "It's a Heartache" (2005 Version) | Ronnie Scott; Steve Wolfe | 3:21 |
| 4. | "Loving You's a Dirty Job (but Somebody's Gotta Do It)" (with Todd Rundgren) | Steinman | 7:51 |
| 5. | "Crying in Berlin" | Paul D. Fitzgerald; Bonnie Tyler; John Stage^{[b]} | 3:36 |
| 6. | "Louise" | Fitzgerald; Tyler; Stage^{[b]} | 3:42 |
| 7. | "Driving Me Crazy" | Karen Drotar; Tyler; Erick Stezycki; St James II^{[b]} | 3:11 |
| 8. | "The Best" | Mike Chapman; Holly Knight | 4:18 |
| 9. | "Lost in France" (Live) | Scott; Wolfe | 4:13 |
| 10. | "Wings" | Fitzgerald; Tyler; Olivier Renoir; Stage^{[b]} | 4:07 |
| 11. | "All I Need Is Love" | Stuart Emerson | 4:46 |
| 12. | "I'll Stand by You" (with Lorraine Crosby) | Emerson | 4:17 |
| 13. | "Time" | Paul Hopkins; Tyler | 3:39 |
| 14. | "Don't Turn Around" | Diane Warren; Albert Hammond | 4:16 |
| 15. | "Take Me Back" | Billy Cross | 5:23 |
| 16. | "Stand Up" | Arnaud de Rozenblat; Y. Shah; Tyler; Stage^{[b]} | 3:33 |
| 17. | "Open Your Eyes" (Re-recording) | Tyler; John Stage; Bethanee Bishop; Oliver Fox^{[c]} | 3:51 |

Disc 2
| No. | Title | Writer(s) | Length |
|---|---|---|---|
| 1. | "Holding Out for a Hero" (Re-recording) | Jim Steinman; Dean Pitchford | 3:43 |
| 2. | "Here She Comes" (Re-recording) | Giorgio Moroder; Pete Bellotte | 3:15 |
| 3. | "If You Were a Woman (And I Was a Man)" (Re-recording) | Desmond Child | 3:50 |
| 4. | "Run Run Run" | Karen Drotar; Bonnie Tyler; Serge Haouzi; John Stage^{[b]} | 3:31 |
| 5. | "Hold Out Your Heart" | Paul D. Fitzgerald; Tyler; Stage^{[b]} | 3:46 |
| 6. | "Under One Sky" | Fitzgerald; Tyler; James Lahcène^{[b]} | 3:27 |
| 7. | "A Rockin' Good Way (to Mess Around and Fall in Love)" (with Shakin' Stevens) | Brook Benton; Clyde Otis; Luchi de Jesus | 2:52 |
| 8. | "Hide Your Heart" | Paul Stanley; Child; Holly Knight | 4:24 |
| 9. | "I Want You" (Re-recording) | Tyler; John Stage^{[b]}; Bethanee Bishop; Oliver Fox^{[c]} | 3:42 |
| 10. | "Straight from the Heart" | Bryan Adams; Eric Kagna | 3:42 |
| 11. | "It's Not Enough" | Tyler; Paul Hopkins; Peter Oxendale | 5:12 |
| 12. | "Simply Believe" (Re-recording) | Tyler; Stage^{[b]}; Bishop; Fox^{[c]} | 4:38 |
| 13. | "I Won't Look Back" | Fitzgerald; Tyler; Lahcène^{[b]} | 3:39 |
| 14. | "Gonna Get Better" | Hopkins; Tyler | 3:28 |
| 15. | "Streets of Stone" | Fitzgerald; Tyler; Stage^{[b]} | 3:30 |
| 16. | "Total Eclipse of the Heart" (2005 Version) | Steinman | 3:53 |
| 17. | "Celebrate" | Drotar; Tyler; Haouzi; Stage^{[b]} | 3:00 |
| 18. | "Band of Gold" | Edyth Wayne; Ronald Dunbar | 5:28 |

Disc 3
| No. | Title | Writer(s) | Length |
|---|---|---|---|
| 1. | "Si demain... (Turn Around)" (with Fanny Llado) | Jim Steinman; Emmanuelle Pribys^{[a]} | 3:53 |
| 2. | "Have You Ever Seen the Rain?" | John Fogerty | 4:08 |
| 3. | "Notes from America" | Desmond Child; Robbie Seidman | 4:55 |
| 4. | "Simply Believe" (Live) | Bonnie Tyler; John Stage^{[b]}; Bethanee Bishop; Oliver Fox^{[c]} | 4:38 |
| 5. | "Save Up All Your Tears" | Child; Diane Warren | 4:25 |
| 6. | "To Love Somebody" | Barry Gibb; Robin Gibb | 5:47 |
| 7. | "No Way to Treat a Lady" | Bryan Adams; Jim Vallance | 5:21 |
| 8. | "Crying in Berlin" (Live) | Paul D. Fitzgerald; Tyler; Stage^{[b]} | 3:49 |
| 9. | "Run Run Run" (Live) | Karen Drotar; Tyler; Serge Haouzi; Stage^{[b]} | 3:31 |
| 10. | "Driving Me Crazy" (Live) | Drotar; Tyler; Erick Stezycki; St James II^{[b]} | 3:25 |
| 11. | "Lovers Again" | Child | 4:37 |
| 12. | "Turtle Blues" | Janis Joplin | 4:14 |
| 13. | "Il Est Mon Homme" | Fitzgerald; Tyler; Jean Lahcène^{[a]}^{[b]}; Julien Billon-Feller^{[a]} | 4:14 |
| 14. | "Chante Avec Moi" | Tyler; Drotar; Stage^{[b]}; Haouzi | 2:56 |
| 15. | "It's a Heartache" (Live) | Ronnie Scott; Steve Wolfe | 5:05 |
| 16. | "Holding Out for a Hero" (Live) | Steinman; Dean Pitchford | 3:48 |
| 17. | "If You Were a Woman (And I Was a Man)" (Live) | Child | 4:26 |
| 18. | "Here She Comes" (Live) | Giorgio Moroder; Pete Bellotte | 3:34 |

=== Notes ===
- ^a French adaptation of lyrics
- ^b Pseudonym for Jean Lahcène
- ^c Pseudonym for Olivier Renoir

== Charts ==
| Chart (2011) | Peak position |
|---|---|
| Belgian Albums (Ultratop Wallonia) | 48 |
| Belgian Heatseekers Albums (Ultratop Wallonia) | 10 |
| French Albums (SNEP) | 36 |
| French Compilation Albums (SNEP) | 6 |
