= From the Heart: Greatest Hits =

Compilation album by Bonnie Tyler
- Released: 12 March 2007
- Recorded: 1976–2005
- Genre: Pop rock
- Length: 1:18:50
- Label: Sony BMG

Bonnie Tyler chronology
Wings (2005)	From the Heart: Greatest Hits (2007)	Best of 3 CD (2011)

From The Heart: Greatest Hits is a greatest hits album by Welsh singer Bonnie Tyler. It was released on 12 March 2007 by Sony BMG. The album contains tracks from across Tyler's recording career, including international hits "Total Eclipse of the Heart", "Holding Out for a Hero" and "It's a Heartache". It also contains more recent recordings, including her cover of The Beatles' "In My Life" from Heart Strings (2003) and "Louise" from Wings (2005).

The album was most successful in Ireland, where it was certified Platinum for sales of 15,000 units with a peak chart placing at no. 2. In the United Kingdom, it was certified Silver by the BPI and reached no. 31 on the albums chart.

== Background and release ==
From the Heart: Greatest Hits was released on 12 March 2007 by Sony BMG. It contains fourteen singles and three album tracks originally released between 1976 and 2005. At the time, Tyler was signed to the French label Stick Music. She released her fourteenth studio album Wings and its lead single "Louise" in 2005. In the following year, the album was reissued in the United Kingdom under the title Celebrate. Wings contains a re-recording of Tyler's hit "Total Eclipse of the Heart". The track was remixed and released as a single in January 2007 in collaboration with BabyPinkStar.

"Si demain... (Turn Around)" with Kareen Antonn, a no. 1 hit in France in 2004, was included on the album as a bonus track having never been released in the UK before.

A new track called "Under One Sky", written by Paul D. Fitzgerald, was planned for inclusion on From the Heart: Greatest Hits and was expected as a single. However, it was cut from the track list and later appeared on Best of 3 CD (2011).

== Critical reception ==
Professional ratings
Review scores
Source	Rating
AllMusic	3/5 stars

From the Heart: Greatest Hits received a mixed review from Sharon Mawer of AllMusic, who complained that Bonnie Tyler compilation albums were being released too frequently, and described songs like "In My Life" and "Si demain... (Turn Around)" as "filler".

== Track listing ==
No.	Title	Writer(s)	Length
1.	"Total Eclipse of the Heart" (Single Version)	Jim Steinman	4:31
2.	"Lost in France"	Ronnie Scott; Steve Wolfe	3:54
3.	"Faster Than the Speed of Night"	Steinman	6:42
4.	"It's a Heartache"	Scott; Wolfe	6:42
5.	"Have You Ever Seen the Rain?"	John Fogerty	4:08
6.	"Holding Out for a Hero"	Steinman	5:51
7.	"Loving You's A Dirty Job (But Somebody's Gotta Do It)" (with Todd Rundgren)	Steinman	7:48
8.	"A Rockin' Good Way (to Mess Around and Fall in Love)" (with Shakin' Stevens)	Brook Benton; Clyde Otis; Luchi DeJesus	2:57
9.	"In My Life"	John Lennon; Paul McCartney	3:01
10.	"Making Love (Out of Nothing At All)"	Steinman	7:49
11.	"(The World Is Full of) Married Men"	Dominic Bugatti; Frank Muske	4:00
12.	"More Than a Lover"	Scott; Wolfe	4:17
13.	"If You Were a Woman (And I Was a Man)"	Desmond Child	5:15
14.	"Streets of Little Italy"	Robbie Seidman	4:41
15.	"You Won't See Me Cry"	Lee Morris; Paul Hopkins	2:48
16.	"Louise"	Paul D. Fitzgerald; Bonnie Tyler	3:46
17.	"Si demain... (Turn Around)" (with Kareen Antonn)	Steinman; Emmanuelle Pribys^{[a]}	3:54
Total length:			1:18:50

=== Notes ===
- ^a French adaptation of lyrics

== Charts ==
Chart (2007)	Peak position
Irish Albums (IRMA)	2
New Zealand Albums (RMNZ)	26
Scottish Albums (Official Charts)	30
Spanish Albums (Promusicae)	76
UK Albums (Official Charts)	31

Chart (2026)	Peak position
UK Album Sales (OCC)	59

== Certifications ==
Region	Certification	Certified units/sales
Ireland (IRMA)	Platinum	15,000^{^}
New Zealand (RMNZ)	Gold	7,500^{‡}
United Kingdom (BPI)	Silver	60,000^{‡}
^{^} Shipments figures based on certification alone.^{‡} Sales+streaming figures based on certification alone.
