= The Very Best of Bonnie Tyler =

The Very Best of Bonnie Tyler is the name or partial name of many Bonnie Tyler albums. It may refer to:

- The Very Best of Bonnie Tyler (1981 album)
- The Very Best of Bonnie Tyler (1993 album)
- The Very Best of Bonnie Tyler (1996 album)
- The Very Best of Bonnie Tyler (2001 album)
- The Very Best of Bonnie Tyler (2003 album)
- The Very Best of Bonnie Tyler (2015 album)
- The Very Best of Bonnie Tyler Volume 2, 1994
- Power & Passion: The Very Best of Bonnie Tyler, 1996
- The Very Best of Bonnie Tyler: Holding Out for a Hero, 2011
