= Simply Believe =

Studio album by Bonnie Tyler
- Released: 13 April 2004
- Recorded: 2003–2004
- Genre: Pop rock
- Length: 59:23
- Label: Yanis
- Producers: Lynda Ramdane; Faouze Barkati; Krem Barkati; Wallid Barkati

Bonnie Tyler chronology
Heart Strings (2003)	Simply Believe (2004)	Wings (2005)

Singles from Simply Believe
- 1. "Si demain... (Turn Around)" Released: 22 December 2003; 2. "Si tout s'arrête (It's a Heartache)" Released: 7 June 2004

Simply Believe is the fourteenth studio album by Welsh singer Bonnie Tyler. It was released on 13 April 2004 by Yanis Records.

The singles from Simply Believe were the two French duets with Kareen Antonn, both originally released as solo singles by Tyler years before. Their first duet, "Si demain... (Turn Around)", was a success, and reached number one in France for ten weeks and became the fourth best-selling single in France in 2004. Eight of the tracks on the album were also released by her then-future record company, Stick Music, on an EP called Bonnie Tyler in 2005. Critical reception of Simply Believe was mostly positive, with the album being regarded as Tyler's "comeback".

== Background ==
After the release of Heart Strings in the previous year, Tyler had begun working on a new album. While getting plans together, French singer Kareen Antonn wrote to Tyler asking if she would be willing to record a bilingual version of "Total Eclipse of the Heart" as a duet with her. Though hesitant, Tyler requested a demo recording of Antonn singing the song in French. Impressed by what she received, Tyler accepted and flew to Paris to record the song. They later recorded a new version of "It's a Heartache" in the same format.

Simply Believe was released through Yanis Records, an independent label, in April 2004. The album contains six original songs. Tyler recorded new versions of "Holding Out for a Hero", "Here She Comes", "If You Were a Woman (And I Was a Man)", as well as two tracks from her 1995 Free Spirit album; "All Night to Know You" and "Driving Me Wild".

== Promotion ==
=== Singles ===
The lead single from Simply Believe was released long before the album, due to popular demand from the public. Tyler explained to BBC News that even the single was released three weeks earlier than planned "after people heard it on the radio and went into the shops trying to buy it." "Si demain..." was released on 22 December 2003, in France. The single reached number one in France and remained there for ten weeks running through 2004, and became the fourth best-selling single that year in France. It also gave Tyler the record of the longest time gap between top ten singles in France. Eighteen years passed between her hit "If You Were a Woman (And I Was a Man)" which reached number six in 1986, and the release of "Si demain...".

Following the success of the single, Simply Believe was released on 13 April 2004. Tyler and Antonn's second duet, "Si tout s'arrête (It' a Heartache)", was released on 7 June 2004 as a follow-up to their first release. It peaked at number 12 in the French singles chart soon after.

== Track listing ==
No.	Title	Writer(s)	Length
1.	"Si demain... (Turn Around)"	Jim Steinman; Emanuelle Pribys^{[a]}	3:50
2.	"Simply Believe"	Bonnie Tyler; John Stage; Bethanee Bishop; Oliver Fox	4:44
3.	"Si tout s'arrête (It's a Heartache)"	Ronnie Scott; Steve Wolfe; Pribys^{[a]}	3:24
4.	"Holding Out for a Hero"	Steinman; Dean Pitchford	3:56
5.	"Back in My Arms"	Stuart Emerson	4:29
6.	"Open Your Eyes"	Tyler; Stage; Bishop; Fox	4:20
7.	"Here She Comes"	Giorgio Moroder; Pete Bellotte	3:16
8.	"Nobody Better"	Emerson	4:08
9.	"If You Were a Woman (And I Was a Man)"	Desmond Child	3:59
10.	"When I Close My Eyes"	Emerson	4:26
11.	"It’s in the Back of My Mind"	Emerson	4:47
12.	"I Want You"	Tyler; Stage; Bishop; Fox	3:57
13.	"Darlin'"	Oscar Stuart Blandamer	3:24
14.	"All Night to Know You"	Emerson	5:22
15.	"Driving Me Wild"	Emerson	4:41
Total length:			59:23

=== Notes ===
- ^a French adaptation of lyrics

== Critical reception ==
Professional ratings
Review scores
Source	Rating
Allmusic	link

The album received a three and a half star review from Rob Theakston of Allmusic. He said that Tyler was "still in fine form two decades (after her musical heyday) later" and that Simply Believe should "satisfy die-hard fans".

== Charts ==
Chart performance for Simply Believe
Chart (2004)	Peak position
Belgian Albums (Ultratop Flanders)	25
French Albums (SNEP)	18
Swiss Albums (Schweizer Hitparade)	35

=== Year-end charts ===
2004 year-end chart performance for Simply Believe
Chart (2004)	Position
French Albums (SNEP)	177

== Personnel ==
Credits adapted from liner notes, and YouTube Music.

- Bonnie Tyler – lead vocals
- Frédéric Andrews – keyboards, organ, programming
- Oliver Fox – keyboards
- Benoit Souris – organ
- John Stage – keyboards, bass, backing vocals
- Sébastien Heurtault – guitars
- Kamil Rustam – guitars
- Tom Box – drums
- Guillaume Duval – harmonica
- Kareen Antonn – lead vocals (1, 3), backing vocals
- Bethanee Bishop – backing vocals
- Mélanie Ducret – backing vocals
- Floriane Godebout – backing vocals
- Delphine Goury – backing vocals
- Fanny Llado – backing vocals
- Jean-Nicolas Sombrun – backing vocals

Production

- Lynda Ramdane – executive producer
- Faouze Barkati – producer
- Krem Barkati – producer
- Wallid Barkati – producer
- Jean Lahcene – engineer
- Bertrand Levet – photography
- Pascal Ratthe – photography
- Nicolas Sautiez – photography
