= List of Ultratop 40 number-one singles of 2004 =

This is a list of songs that topped the Belgian Walloon (francophone) Ultratop 40 charts in 2004.

Issue date	Artist(s)	Title
January 3	Tragédie	Hey Oh
January 10	Star Academy 3	L'Orange / Wot
January 17	Star Academy 3	L'Orange / Wot
January 24	The Black Eyed Peas	Shut Up
January 31	The Black Eyed Peas	Shut Up
February 7	The Black Eyed Peas	Shut Up
February 14	Kareen Antonn and Bonnie Tyler	Si Demain... (Turn Around)
February 21	Kareen Antonn and Bonnie Tyler	Si Demain... (Turn Around)
February 28	Kareen Antonn and Bonnie Tyler	Si Demain... (Turn Around)
March 6	Kareen Antonn and Bonnie Tyler	Si Demain... (Turn Around)
March 13	Kareen Antonn and Bonnie Tyler	Si Demain... (Turn Around)
March 20	Kareen Antonn and Bonnie Tyler	Si Demain... (Turn Around)
March 27	Kareen Antonn and Bonnie Tyler	Si Demain... (Turn Around)
April 3	Kareen Antonn and Bonnie Tyler	Si Demain... (Turn Around)
April 10	Usher feat Lil Jon and Ludacris	Yeah!
April 17	Usher feat Lil Jon and Ludacris	Yeah!
April 24	Usher feat Lil Jon and Ludacris	Yeah!
May 1	Usher feat Lil Jon and Ludacris	Yeah!
May 8	Usher feat Lil Jon and Ludacris	Yeah!
May 15	O-Zone	Dragostea Din Tei
May 22	O-Zone	Dragostea Din Tei
May 29	O-Zone	Dragostea Din Tei
June 5	O-Zone	Dragostea Din Tei
June 12	O-Zone	Dragostea Din Tei
June 19	O-Zone	Dragostea Din Tei
June 26	O-Zone	Dragostea Din Tei
July 3	O-Zone	Dragostea Din Tei
July 10	O-Zone	Dragostea Din Tei
July 17	O-Zone	Dragostea Din Tei
July 24	O-Zone	Dragostea Din Tei
July 31	K.Maro	Femme Like U (Donne-moi ton corps)
August 7	K.Maro	Femme Like U (Donne-moi ton corps)
August 14	K.Maro	Femme Like U (Donne-moi ton corps)
August 21	K.Maro	Femme Like U (Donne-moi ton corps)
August 28	K.Maro	Femme Like U (Donne-moi ton corps)
September 4	K.Maro	Femme Like U (Donne-moi ton corps)
September 11	K.Maro	Femme Like U (Donne-moi ton corps)
September 18	K.Maro	Femme Like U (Donne-moi ton corps)
September 25	K.Maro	Femme Like U (Donne-moi ton corps)
October 2	K.Maro	Femme Like U (Donne-moi ton corps)
October 9	K.Maro	Femme Like U (Donne-moi ton corps)
October 16	Star Academy 4	Laissez-moi danser
October 23	Star Academy 4	Laissez-moi danser
October 30	Star Academy 4	Laissez-moi danser
November 6	Star Academy 4	Laissez-moi danser
November 13	Star Academy 4	Laissez-moi danser
November 20	Star Academy 4	Laissez-moi danser
November 27	Tragédie	Gentleman
December 4	Tragédie	Gentleman
December 11	Tragédie	Gentleman
December 18	Garou & Michel Sardou	La Rivière de notre enfance
December 25	Garou & Michel Sardou	La Rivière de notre enfance

== Best-selling singles ==
This is the ten best-selling/performing singles in 2004.

Pos.	Artist	Title	HP	Weeks
1	O-Zone	"Dragostea Din Tei"	1	33
2	Kareen Antonn & Bonnie Tyler	"Si Demain... (Turn Around)"	1	31
3	K.Maro	"Femme Like U (Donne-moi ton corps)"	1	26
4	Aventura	"Obsesión"	2	46
5	Usher featuring Lil Jon and Ludacris	"Yeah!"	1	28
6	The Black Eyed Peas	"Shut Up"	1	22
7	Nadiya	"Parle-moi"	2	31
8	Hélène Segara & Laura Pausini	"On n'oublie jamais rien, on vit avec"	2	25
9	Leslie featuring Amine	"Sobri (notre destin)"	2	25
10	Star Academy 4	"Laissez-moi danser"	1	12

== See also ==
- 2004 in music
