= If You Were a Woman (And I Was a Man) =

Single by Bonnie Tyler

from the album Secret Dreams and Forbidden Fire
- B-side: "Under Suspicion"
- Released: 12 March 1986 (US)
- Recorded: 1986
- Genre: Pop rock; synth-pop
- Length: 5:15
- Label: Columbia
- Songwriter: Desmond Child
- Producer: Jim Steinman

Bonnie Tyler singles chronology
"Loving You's a Dirty Job but Somebody's Gotta Do It" (1985)	"If You Were a Woman (And I Was a Man)" (1986)	"Band of Gold" (1986)

Music video
- "If You Were a Woman (And I Was a Man)" "If You Were a Woman (And I Was a Man)" (Extended Version) on YouTube

"If You Were a Woman (And I Was a Man)" is a song recorded by Welsh singer Bonnie Tyler for her 1986 rock album Secret Dreams and Forbidden Fire. It was written by Desmond Child and produced by Jim Steinman. Child has since stated that the song was re-written as "You Give Love a Bad Name" with Bon Jovi after he was dissatisfied with the chart performance of "If You Were a Woman (And I Was a Man)". It was successful in Europe, reaching number six in France and sold over 250,000 copies. The song also reached number 77 on the US Billboard Hot 100, and has since been Tyler's last hit single in the United States. Tyler re-recorded the song on her 2004 album Simply Believe.

== Background and composition ==
After the success of Faster Than the Speed of Night in 1983, Bonnie Tyler went on to work with Jim Steinman on a second album. "If You Were a Woman (And I Was a Man)" was released as the third single from Tyler's 1986 album Secret Dreams and Forbidden Fire after the international success of first single "Holding Out for a Hero", which was originally released in 1984 from the soundtrack to the film Footloose. Steinman recruited Desmond Child for two tracks, including "If You Were a Woman" (the other being "Lovers Again"). Steinman told Child that he wanted a song about androgyny. "I want a special song. The verses have to sound like Tina Turner, the B Section has to sound like The Police, U2, or Hall & Oates, and the chorus has to sound like Bruce Springsteen," he continued.

After he had completed his work on Secret Dreams and Forbidden Fire and the single had peaked, Child went to work with Bon Jovi a few months later. He co-wrote "You Give Love a Bad Name" with Jon Bon Jovi and Richie Sambora using the same chorus composition and made the song a hit. "I was sore at the record company for not pushing that song ["If You Were a Woman (And I Was a Man)"], and I said, "I'm going to prove that that song's a hit!" So we wrote it again."

== Critical reception ==
The album Secret Dreams and Forbidden Fire received generally positive reviews from music critics. People magazine described the album as "bombastic", and that "most of the time the bombast is kept within tolerable limits." AllMusic retrospectively complimented "If You Were a Woman (And I Was a Man)", though described the whole album as a substandard to Faster Than the Speed of Night for lacking "a cranium-blasting "Faster Than the Speed of Night" or chart-busting "Total Eclipse of the Heart"." Jerry Smith of the Music Week magazine considered the track a Tyler "typical number" with a "ponderous title", describing it as "a sanitised American rock single that is made for the radio". The song was similarly described as a "typical Bonnie Tyler ballad" by Paul Speelman of The Age, who added that the song has "a good, solid arrangement". Betty Page of Record Mirror presented it as a "point-by-numbers tune which goes well over the top of the end. Oddly enough, it sounds curiously similar to an early Spandau Ballet number".

== Commercial performance ==
Upon its release, "If You Were a Woman (And I Was a Man)" debuted at number 42 in France, rising to number 6 two months later. It was certified Silver by the SNEP with sales of over 250,000 copies in France.

Elsewhere in continental Europe, "If You Were a Woman (And I Was a Man)" was a hit in Finland, Switzerland and West Germany, where it peaked at number 11, 16 and 36 respectively, the single stayed in the European Hot 100 Singles for 22 weeks. The song failed to significantly impact the UK singles chart, however, spending three weeks in the chart, peaking at number 78. Across the Atlantic, the song peaked at number 77 on the Billboard Hot 100 and number 87 on the Canadian RPM Top Singles chart.

== Music video ==
In conjunction with the single release, Tyler recorded a music video for "If You Were a Woman (And I Was a Man)". Three versions of the video were published. The longest, uncut version runs to 5:54. The "extended" version is only 5:29 and is missing a few lines of dialogue (e.g. "You ready? You ready? you ready?" "I was born ready") and rather than the transformation of the Rambo character into a Marilyn Monroe character, an explosion of light is used and the third version runs to 4:40 and omits the opening dialogue sequence and all of the additional dialogue bar "Welcome to The Dive!".

The screenplay for this music video was written by Jim Steinman and he also produced and co-directed it.

Excerpts of the music video are shown on a TV during Tyler's 1992 music video for "The Desert Is in Your Heart".

=== Synopsis ===
The video opens with some exposition from an elderly woman with an English accent. She speaks of her past — she was a singer and owner of a club called The Dive in an area called The Deep End - and the video reflects what happened in her past—at the turn of the 21st century, during a time of warfare.

The video then cuts and widens full-screen as the song begins. We see a dark alley full of people, some nuns in the background, a boy in a black leather jacket and his dog. One man in the alley with "DIVE" painted on his forehead pulls another along on a chain, presumably a slave. We then cut to a dressing room in a club—Bonnie Tyler sits in front of a mirror, reading a newspaper with one headline: "City under siege". At this point we realise the Bonnie Tyler character is the elderly woman's flashback to the past she described earlier.

The boy seen earlier with the dog begins running down the stairs and yells to Bonnie "Hey! It's showtime doll, showtime! You ready, you ready, you ready?" to which she replies: "I'm ready, I'm ready, I was born ready".

The scene flashes briefly to the dark alley—the war, some nuns, some medics.

It then returns to a different woman—in red, opening a door and inviting us in: "Ah! Welcome to The Dive! You won't believe your eyes! Or any other part of your body! Hahahahaha! This section here, is for colours only! And that section, is for black and white!" as the colour fades from the video and the room is shown in monochrome. There are dancers everywhere. The colours section does contain mainly people of colour, some in tribal costumes and paint. The black and white section does too, but also contains people in centuries-old European clothes, in the same tribal paint. There are also semi naked muscular men, some caught like flies in a giant spider web, dozens of feet high. Bonnie Tyler is lowered from the ceiling, singing, past the spider web, and everyone stops dancing.

As she continues to sing, both sections of the room can be seen—half monochrome and half colour, people dance freely from one side to the other, crossing over and gaining or losing colour as they cross over. Bonnie sings in black and white, a big cloth falls from behind her and with it, colour invades the whole room. Everyone starts dancing again.

Outside in the alley again, a gang of heavily armed girls corner a man who was just standing there, slap him to the ground, point a gun at him and force lipstick on him. The sound of a bomb whistling and landing is heard, and we see the dark alley erupt with fire, explosions. Medics run with a stretcher, and nuns tend the injured.

Meanwhile, in the club, Bonnie continues to sing and women cheer surround a pit of mud which contains four men (who are tied together in pairs) mud-wrestling. A man resembling the character Rambo glides into the room on a zip wire, landing on a raised platform. Bonnie and everyone behind her (men and women) raise Venus symbols at him. He begins to look worried, something moves and bulges under his skin, he tries to push it down, but it rips his skin open, and an arm begins to reach out of his mouth. His head explodes and he transforms into a shocked Marilyn Monroe lookalike. She walks down the steps, and blows a kiss to Bonnie as she walks past, who blows another back, while continuing the song. More singing and dancing through to the end—the boy in leather looks up at Bonnie.

Marilyn leaves the club, blowing a kiss to the camera. Walking alone in the dark alley—now desolate, small fires burning.

The voice of the elderly woman repeats as she did in the opening—"Down in the deep end, behind the walls of the dive – it was like a footnote to paradise".

=== Relation to other works by Jim Steinman ===
Steinman had already provided a small amount of gender bender voice work on his earlier works; he provided the "lascivious effects" for the song "Paradise by the Dashboard Light", both the male and female lovemaking sounds. He recited the female dialogue "I'd do anything for love... but I won't do that!" on Bonnie Tyler's song "Getting So Excited" when she refused to do it. By the mid-1980s he was experimenting with androgyny, manufacturing the band Fire Inc for the songs in the film Streets of Fire by blending the voices of female (Laurie Sargent, Holly Sherwood) and male (Rory Dodd) voices together as one to produce a single super-voice.

The theme of colour vs black-and-white recurs in the song with the lyrics "can you colorise my life? I'm so sick of black and white" in the song "I'd Do Anything for Love". In early 2017 previews of his Bat Out of Hell: The Musical, there was a line in dialogue "Why are nuns so scary? It's because the world is in color and the nuns are black and white".

The scenario of this music video does appear to be part of Steinman's "Obsidian" universe. The location is mentioned in Steinman's earlier work Neverland and is also a location in Bat Out of Hell: The Musical. Bat Out of Hell: The Musical is set in 2030 according to the "Obsidian Times" newspapers they hand out at the show, whereas the elderly woman in this video refers to the turn of the 21st century. One character in Bat Out of Hell: The Musical mentions there having been "chemical wars" in the past.

The line "You won't believe your eyes.. or any other part of your body!" also occurs in Jim Steinman's own music video "Dance in My Pants", and is spoken by a woman on the door of a different club. Rather than simple reuse of a joke, it may have been done to draw a parallel, or imply that both establishments are supposed to be in "The Deep End".

=== Reception ===
The video received six nominations at the 1986 Billboard Video Music Conference; Best Conceptual Video, Best Special Effects, Best Audio, Best Costumes, Best Choreographer (Edmond Kresley) and Best Set Designer (Stephan Roman).

== Live performances ==
In October 2005, Tyler performed "If You Were a Woman (And I Was a Man)" live at the Fiestas del Pilar in Zaragoza, Spain. It was recorded and released on Tyler's concert film, Bonnie on Tour, and its accompanying live album Bonnie Tyler Live. In 2015, Tyler performed the song live on the sixth season of X-Factor, the Ukrainian version of The X Factor, with contestant Bogdan Sovyk.

== Track listing and formats ==
- 7" single
1. "If You Were a Woman (And I Was a Man)" – 4:00
2. "Under Suspicion" – 4:20
- 12" maxi
1. "If You Were a Woman (And I Was a Man)" (extended version) – 4:46
2. "Straight from the Heart" – 3:38
3. "Under Suspicion" – 4:20

== Charts ==
=== Weekly charts ===
Chart (1986)	Peak position
Australia (Kent Music Report)	77
Canada Top Singles (RPM)	87
European Hot 100 Singles (Music & Media)	30
Finland (Suomen virallinen lista)	11
France (SNEP)	6
New Zealand (Recorded Music NZ)	20
Switzerland (Schweizer Hitparade)	16
UK Singles (Official Charts)	78
US Billboard Hot 100	77
West Germany (GfK Entertainment Charts)	36

Chart (2026)	Peak position
Poland Airplay (OLiS)	78

=== Year-end charts ===
Chart (1986)	Peak
European Hot 100 Singles (Music & Media)	63

== Certifications and sales ==
Region	Certification	Certified units/sales
France (SNEP)	Silver	250,000^{*}
^{*} Sales figures based on certification alone.

== Re-recordings ==
As well as making regular appearances on compilation albums, Tyler has re-recorded the song multiple times. "If You Were a Woman (And I Was a Man)" featured on her 2004 album Simply Believe and on her 2005 EP Bonnie Tyler. In conjunction with the release of Wings in 2005, Tyler performed in Zaragoza, Spain, and the concert was filmed for her DVD Bonnie on Tour and CD Bonnie Tyler Live, which include the song on the track list.

== Cover versions ==
The song was covered by Robin Beck for her 1989 album Trouble Or Nothin', produced by Child and his longtime collaborator Sir Arthur Payson. The album also features other songs written by Child originally recorded by Tyler, including "Hide Your Heart" and "Save Up All Your Tears".

RuPaul recorded the song for his album Foxy Lady (1996). The album received a negative review from AllMusic, opining that the album was "an attempt to expand RuPaul's pop culture phenomenon status into a genuine career," but that it lacked any catchy songs.

Ava Max has replayed the melody of the song in her 2020 single "Kings & Queens" featured on her album Heaven & Hell.
