= Bonnie on Tour =

Video by Bonnie Tyler
- Released: 2006
- Genre: Rock
- Label: Stick Music
- Producer: John Stage

Bonnie Tyler chronology
Bonnie Tyler Live (2006)	Bonnie on Tour (2006)	From The Heart: Greatest Hits (2007)

Bonnie on Tour is a live DVD by Welsh singer Bonnie Tyler. It was released in 2006 by Stick Music. The DVD contains footage of Tyler performing at La Cigale in Paris, France, at the 2005 Sopot International Song Festival in Poland, and at an open-air concert in Zaragosa, Spain on 10 October 2005, as well as various bonus content.

A CD version of Bonnie on Tour titled Bonnie Tyler Live was released by Stick Music on 9 July 2006. It is the first live album by Tyler. The set list included songs from Tyler's albums Wings (2005), Simply Believe (2004), Secret Dreams and Forbidden Fire (1986), Faster Than the Speed of Night (1983), Natural Force (1978) and The World Starts Tonight (1977).

== Background ==
Tyler embarked on a European tour to support the release of her fifteenth studio album Wings in 2005. The album was recorded and produced at the Pasteur Studio in Paris, France and many of the session musicians joined Tyler for a series of concerts. The first half of the DVD includes footage from Tyler's concert to celebrate her 54th birthday on 8 June 2005 at La Cigale in Paris. Additional concert footage includes her appearance at the Sopot International Song Festival in Poland in September 2005, and a free open air concert at the Fiestas del Pilar in Zaragoza, Spain on 10 October 2005.

Bonus features include the music video for her 2005 single "Louise" and behind-the-scenes footage on location in Bizerte, Tunisia.

== Critical reception ==
Professional ratings
Review scores
Source	Rating
Allmusic	4/5 stars

Tomas Mureika of AllMusic gave the accompanying live CD a positive review, stating that "Tyler is -- at heart -- an amazing live performer and this is a great chronicle of her abilities." His only criticism was that the majority of songs performed were her most recent work, stating that he would have preferred more of "the masterpieces Tyler created with Jim Steinman."

== Track listing ==
DVD
No.	Title	Writer(s)	Length
1.	"Intro" (France)	Jim Steinman; Dean Pitchford	1:04
2.	"Holding Out for a Hero" (France)	Steinman; Pitchford	3:50
3.	"All I Need Is Love" (France)	Stuart Emerson	4:49
4.	"Driving Me Crazy" (France)	Karen Drotar; Bonnie Tyler	4:21
5.	"Crying in Berlin" (France)	Paul D. Fitzgerald; Tyler	3:54
6.	"Celebrate" (France)	Drotar; Tyler	3:55
7.	"Hold Out Your Heart" (France)	Fitzgerald; Tyler	4:15
8.	"Run Run Run" (France)	Drotar; Tyler	3:28
9.	"Louise" (France)	Fitzgerald; Tyler	3:36
10.	"Interlude" ("Holding Out for a Hero" theme)	Steinman; Pitchford	1:58
11.	"Lost in France" (France)	Ronnie Scott; Steve Wolfe	4:26
12.	"Bonnie's Birthday Celebration" (France)		2:56
13.	"Total Eclipse of the Heart" (France)	Steinman	3:59
14.	"Bonnie Introduces the Band" (France)		4:42
15.	"It's a Heartache" (France)	Scott; Wolfe	4:57
16.	"Departure of the Band" (Poland)		0:56
17.	"It's a Heartache" (Poland)	Scott; Wolfe	1:57
18.	"Dinner with Bonnie" (Poland)		4:00
19.	"The Band Visits Molo" (Poland)		1:56
20.	"Louise Video" (Tunisia)	Fitzgerald; Tyler	3:37
21.	"Makin'Of" (Tunisia)		4:03
22.	"Bonnie Meets Her Fans" (France)		2:27
23.	"Lunch and Dinner with Bonnie" (France)		0:56
24.	"If You Were a Woman" (Spain)	Desmond Child	5:45
25.	"Simply Believe" (Spain)	John Stage; Tyler; B. Bishop	5:15
26.	"Here She Comes" (Spain)	Giorgio Moroder; Peter Bellote	3:37
27.	"Backstage" (Spain)		1:47
28.	"Les Laurentines" (Canada)		2:39
29.	"Marrakech "Shopping"" (Morocco)		3:27
30.	"Picture Gallery"		1:45
31.	"Song Lyrics"		1:20
Total length:			79:03

== Personnel ==
Credits for Bonnie on Tour adapted from the DVD credits roll.

=== Musicians ===
- Bonnie Tyler – lead vocals
- Frédéric Andrews – keyboards
- Sébastien Heurtault – lead guitar
- Stéphane Vaillant – second guitar
- William Andrews – folk guitar
- Gaedic Chambrier – guitar
- David Andrews – bass guitar
- Vincent Antheaume – percussion
- Laurent Locuratolo – drums
- Guillaume Duval – saxophone
- Pascale Andrews – accordion, backing vocals
- John Sombrun – backing vocals
- Binta Dossa – backing vocals
- Angélique Le Goupil – backing vocals
- Elisabeth Andrews – backing vocals
- Delphine Goury – backing vocals
- Floriane Godebout – backing vocals
- Normandy Highland Pipe Band – bagpipes

=== Production ===
- Jean Lahcene – producer, recording, editing, mixing
- James Lahcene – engineer
- Fabrice Thomas – DVD authoring
- Lionel Ducos – business manager, DVD authoring
- Robert Sullivan – manager
- François Prieto / pop@work – artwork
- Eric Robert – photography
- DUCS – photography
- Bertrand Levet – photography

== Charts ==
Chart (2007)	Peak position
UK Music Video Chart (OCC)	43

== Release history ==
Country	Date	Label
France	7 April 2006	Stick Music
Germany	21 April 2006	Stick Music
United Kingdom	10 July 2006	Stick Music
Various	23 February 2018	ZYX Music
