= Say Goodbye (Bonnie Tyler song) =

Single by Bonnie Tyler

from the album Asterix Conquers America
- Released: 1994
- Genre: Soft rock
- Length: 3:23
- Label: Hansa
- Songwriters: David Cooke; Harold Faltermeyer; Magda Labonté
- Producers: Harold Faltermeyer; Uli Fisher

Bonnie Tyler singles chronology
"Back Home" (1994)	"Say Goodbye" (1994)	"Making Love (Out of Nothing at All)" (1995)

Licensed audio
- "Say Goodbye" on YouTube

"Say Goodbye" is a song recorded by Welsh singer Bonnie Tyler for the soundtrack to the 1994 film Asterix Conquers America. It was released by Hansa Records, written by David Cooke, Harold Faltermeyer and Magda Labonté, and produced by Faltermeyer and Uli Fisher.

== Background and release ==
Tyler's involvement in the soundtrack for Asterix Conquers America was announced in June 1994. Prior to the film's release, she attended a press event in London where she posed with a promotional figure of the title character, Asterix. Early press reports identified her contribution, "Say Goodbye", as the film's title song. Tyler performed the song live on RTL Samstag Nacht on 29 October 1994.

== Critical reception ==
Bravo magazine described "Say Goodbye" as a "high-class ballad" and noted Tyler's "surprisingly soft" vocal tone.

== Format and track listing ==
- German maxi CD single
1. "Say Goodbye" (radio edit) – 3:23
2. "Say Goodbye" (classical version) – 3:18
3. "Say Goodbye" (extended version) – 5:20

== Charts ==
Weekly chart performance
Chart (1994)	Peak position
East Central Europe Airplay (Music & Media)	19
