= Live in Germany 1993 =

Live album

Live album by Bonnie Tyler
- Released: 2 December 2011
- Recorded: 1993
- Genre: Pop
- Length: 38:02
- Label: ZYX Music

Bonnie Tyler chronology
| Best of 3 CD (2011) | Live in Germany 1993 (2011) | Rocks and Honey (2013) |

Live in Germany 1993 is the second live album and concert film by Welsh singer Bonnie Tyler. It was released on 2 December 2011 by ZYX Music. The concert was recorded at the Schlachthof in Frankfurt, Germany in 1993 and originally broadcast by ARD 1 Plus.

The set list included tracks from Tyler's albums The World Starts Tonight (1977), Natural Force (1978), Faster Than the Speed of Night (1983), Secret Dreams and Forbidden Fire (1986), Hide Your Heart (1988), Bitterblue (1991) and Angel Heart (1992). Tyler also performed "Bitterblue" and "God Gave Love to You" during the concert, but neither performance was included on the album or DVD. The concert closes with an excerpt of "Lovers Again", which appears on the DVD but not the album.

== Background ==
In 1989, hr-fernsehen and Bayerischer Rundfunk launched Live aus dem Schlachthof, a talk show with live music. It was filmed at der Schlachthof, a former slaughterhouse that was repurposed as a concert venue until its closure in 1994.

== Track listing ==
Standard edition
| No. | Title | Writer(s) | Origin | Length |
|---|---|---|---|---|
| 1. | "Hide Your Heart" | Desmond Child; Robbie Seidman | Hide Your Heart (1988) | 4:45 |
| 2. | "Race to the Fire" | Dieter Bohlen | Angel Heart (1992) | 4:26 |
| 3. | "To Love Somebody" | Barry Gibb; Robin Gibb | Hide Your Heart (1988) | 6:59 |
| 4. | "Lost in France" | Ronnie Scott; Steve Wolfe | The World Starts Tonight (1977) | 2:50 |
| 5. | "It's a Heartache" | Scott; Wolfe | Natural Force (1978) | 1:45 |
| 6. | "Where Were You" | Albert Hammond; Holly Knight | Bitterblue (1991) | 4:07 |
| 7. | "Straight from the Heart" | Bryan Adams; Eric Kagna | Faster Than the Speed of Night (1983) | 4:59 |
| 8. | "Total Eclipse of the Heart" | Jim Steinman | Faster Than the Speed of Night (1983) | 6:42 |
| 9. | "Holding Out for a Hero" | Steinman; Dean Pitchford | Secret Dreams and Forbidden Fire (1986) | 4:55 |
| Total length: | | | | 38:02 |

DVD Bonus
| No. | Title | Writer(s) | Origin | Length |
|---|---|---|---|---|
| 10. | "Lovers Again" | Child | Secret Dreams and Forbidden Fire (1986) | 2:34 |
| Total length: | | | | 40:36 |

== Re-release ==
ZYX Music released Live & Lost in France on May 10, 2013. This CD/DVD release is a re-issue.
