= Total Eclipse of the Heart =

1983 single by Bonnie Tyler

- Picture sleeve of UK and some European releases

Single by Bonnie Tyler

from the album Faster Than the Speed of Night
- B-side: "Take Me Back" (UK); "Straight from the Heart" (US)
- Released: 11 February 1983
- Recorded: 1982
- Studio: Power Station (New York City)
- Genre: Pop rock; power pop
- Length: 7:02 (album version); 4:30 (single edit); 5:34 (video version)
- Label: CBS; Columbia
- Songwriter: Jim Steinman
- Producer: Jim Steinman

Bonnie Tyler singles chronology
"Goodbye to the Island" (1980)	"Total Eclipse of the Heart" (1983)	"Faster Than the Speed of Night" (1983)

Music video
- "Total Eclipse of the Heart" on YouTube

"Total Eclipse of the Heart" is the lead single by Welsh singer Bonnie Tyler from her fifth studio album, Faster Than the Speed of Night (1983) written and produced by Jim Steinman and recorded in 1982, released as a single by CBS/Columbia in 1983.

The duet with Rory Dodd became Tyler's biggest career hit, topping the UK Singles Chart, and becoming the fifth-best-selling single in 1983 in the United Kingdom. In the United States, the single spent four weeks at the top of the charts, keeping another Steinman penned song "Making Love Out of Nothing at All" by Air Supply from reaching the top spot (a song Tyler would later cover in 1995), and it was Billboard's number-six song of the year for 1983. The song was nominated for the Grammy Award for Best Female Pop Vocal Performance. Its accompanying music video was directed by Russell Mulcahy and filmed in Surrey, England.

The single has sold over 13 million copies worldwide, becoming one of the best-selling singles of all time, and was certified gold by the Recording Industry Association of America for sales of over one million copies after its release, updated to platinum in 2001 when the certification threshold changed. In 2015, the song was voted by the British public as the nation's third favourite 1980s number one in a poll for ITV.

Following Tyler's death in July 2026, "Total Eclipse of the Heart" re-entered the UK Singles Chart, peaking at number 29.

== Background and composition ==
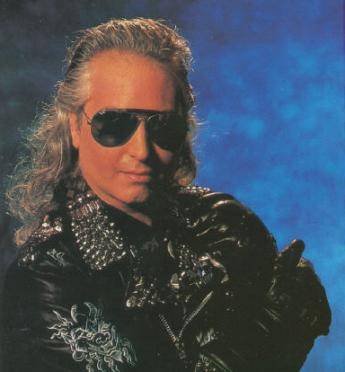
Jim Steinman (pictured in 1989) wrote and produced "Total Eclipse of the Heart"

After her contract with RCA Records ended in 1981, Tyler found a new manager in David Aspden. After seeing Meat Loaf perform "Bat Out of Hell" live on The Old Grey Whistle Test, she approached Meat Loaf's writer, Jim Steinman, and asked him to be her producer. Tyler aimed to create an album utilizing the Wall of Sound production techniques of Phil Spector, and she believed that Steinman was the only person who could still create the same sound as Spector, who had mostly retired from the music business. Tyler visited Steinman in his apartment in New York in April 1982 with her manager, where she was presented with two tracks: "Have You Ever Seen the Rain?" and "Goin' Through the Motions". She stated that had she not liked the songs Steinman played for her, he would have rejected Tyler's invitation to collaborate. She returned to his studio apartment weeks later, where Steinman and Rory Dodd performed "Total Eclipse of the Heart" for her. Steinman also hand-picked the recording band for the song, which included Dodd as a featured vocalist (the "Turn around..." refrain).

The lyric "Turn around, bright eyes" had originally appeared in Steinman's 1969 college musical The Dream Engine. Steinman had originally written the song's verse melody for his score to the 1980 film A Small Circle of Friends. Steinman said in an interview with Playbill about the inclusion of the song in his 1997 musical Dance of the Vampires:

with 'Total Eclipse of the Heart', I was trying to come up with a love song and I remembered I actually wrote that to be a vampire love song. Its original title was 'Vampires in Love' because I was working on a musical of Nosferatu, the other great vampire story. If anyone listens to the lyrics, they're really like vampire lines. It's all about the darkness, the power of darkness and love's place in the dark...

He also told People that he thought Tyler sounded like John Fogerty and wrote the song "to be a showpiece for her voice." Tyler described the song as "a challenge [to sing]," stating that she "[doesn't] like songs that anybody can sing. I like songs that need a lot of energy." After Steinman presented her with the song, she told The Times, "I just had shivers right up my spine...I couldn't wait to actually get in and record it." Tyler told Record Mirror that she thought the song was about "someone who wants to love so badly she's lying there in complete darkness."

According to Meat Loaf, Steinman had written the song, along with "Making Love Out of Nothing at All", for Meat Loaf's album Midnight at the Lost and Found; however, Meat Loaf's record company refused to pay Steinman, and he wrote separate songs himself. "Total Eclipse of the Heart" was given to Bonnie Tyler and "Making Love Out of Nothing at All" to Air Supply. Tyler has denied this claim. "Meat Loaf was apparently very annoyed that Jim gave that to me," Tyler stated. "But Jim said he didn't write it for Meat Loaf, that he only finished it after meeting me." Steinman said to People that he considered it "an aria to me, a wagnerian-like onslaught of sound and emotion. I wrote it to be a showpiece for her voice."

In an interview with journalist Mick Wall shortly after the release of Meat Loaf's 2006 album Bat Out of Hell III: The Monster Is Loose, Steinman stated: "I didn't write [Total Eclipse of the Heart] for anyone but Bonnie." Steinman believed that CBS were expecting him to write something similar to "It's a Heartache", but he had different ideas.

== Release ==
"Total Eclipse of the Heart" had to be shortened for radio play. Tyler did not believe that the song was radio-friendly at its full length; the song was reduced from seven minutes and two seconds to four minutes and thirty seconds. For the music video, a five minute and thirty four second edit was used.

The power ballad became Tyler's highest-charting song in several countries, peaking at No. 1 in the United States, South Africa, Australia, New Zealand, Canada and the United Kingdom. At its peak, it sold 60,000 copies per day and sold over 13 million copies in total. It won the Variety Club award in the UK for best recording artist of 1983. The song also made number 82 of VH1's top 100 love songs.

"Total Eclipse of the Heart"
A sample of "Total Eclipse of the Heart", performed by Bonnie Tyler.

== Music video ==
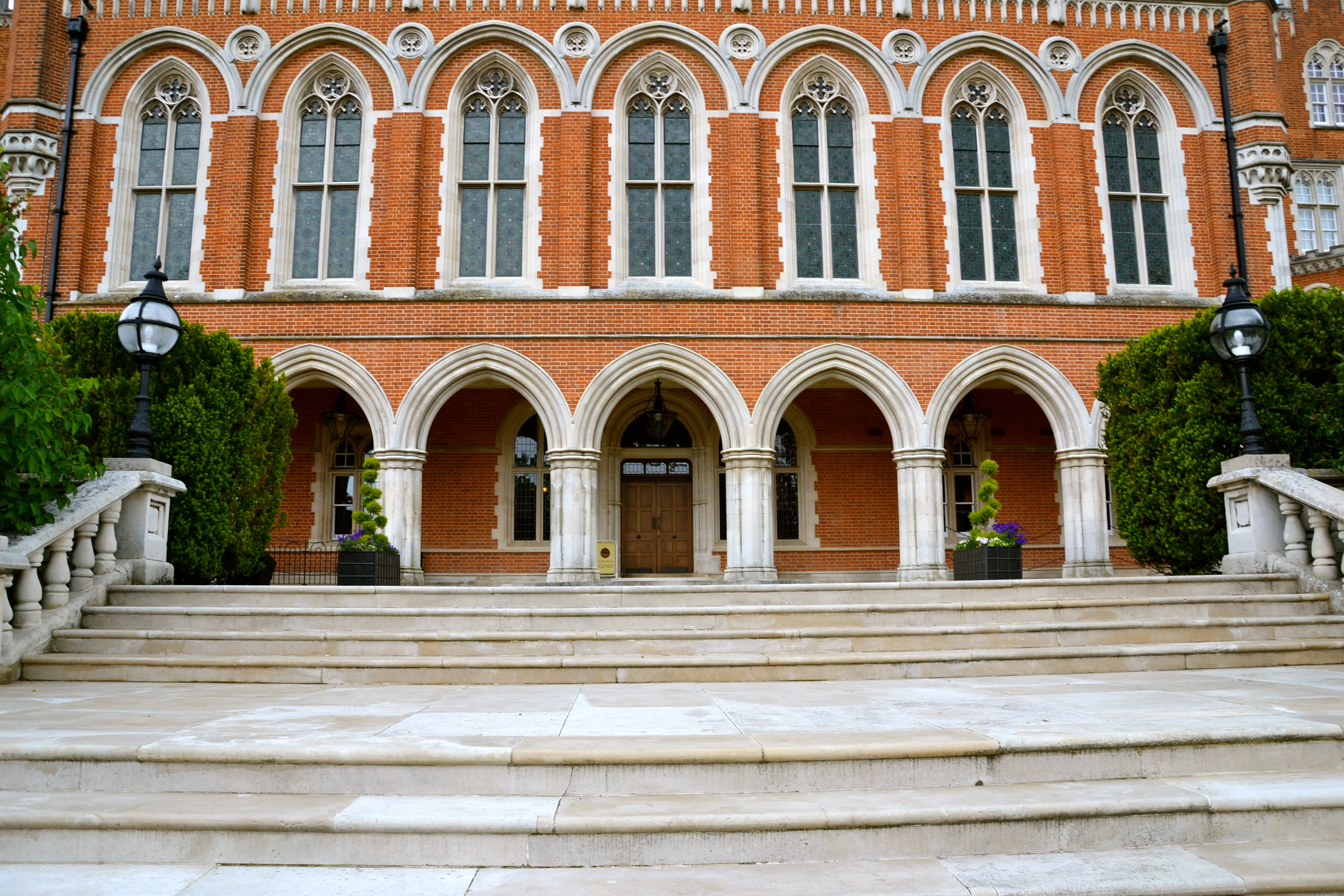
Holloway Sanatorium steps, which feature in the video

The music video for "Total Eclipse of the Heart" was directed by Australian director Russell Mulcahy and was filmed at the Holloway Sanatorium, a large Victorian Gothic hospital near Virginia Water, Surrey, England. The surrealist video features Tyler clad in white, dreaming or fantasizing about students in a boys' boarding school. Young men are seen dancing and participating in various school activities and singing in a choir.

The video received two nominations at the Billboard Video Music Awards in 1983 for Best Performance by a Female and Most Effective Use of Symbolism.

An urban legend is that the boy who appears throughout the video and who shakes Tyler's hand at the end is former Italian footballer Gianfranco Zola. In a 2012 interview, Zola confirmed that he did not appear in the video.

In September 2023, the video exceeded one billion views on YouTube.

== Live performances ==
Since the song's release, Tyler has performed "Total Eclipse of the Heart" in all of her concerts. "I sing it much better now than I used to," she told The Huffington Post. "I think my voice is probably not as husky as it was, I think it's mellowed a bit." The song was performed at the 26th Annual Grammy Awards, held at the Shrine Auditorium, Los Angeles, on 28 February 1984.

Bonnie Tyler sang "Total Eclipse of the Heart" live on board a Royal Caribbean cruise ship during the solar eclipse of 21 August 2017, backed by DNCE.

Live recordings of Tyler performing the song have been released on her albums Bonnie Tyler Live (2006) and Live in Germany 1993 (2011). Video performances have also been released on Tyler's DVDs, Bonnie on Tour (2006) and the DVD edition of Live in Germany 1993.

== Critical reception ==
Mike DeGagne from AllMusic retrospectively described "Total Eclipse of the Heart" as "one of the finest ballads ever to hit radio." He noted the "lush instrumentation" and said that Tyler's voice "produced the perfect type of 'desperate lovelorn' effect to suit the romantic lyrics." He described Roy Bittan's piano playing as "dreamy" and described Tyler's voice as "wonderfully gritty." Donald A. Guarisco, also from AllMusic, retrospectively reviewed Faster Than the Speed of Night and noted the song as an "epic ballad", describing the whole album as "rock at its most melodramatic." Jim Beviglia from American Songwriter said that Tyler's raspy vocals helped to legitimize the "melodrama inherent in the lyrics," and described the song as a "garment-rending, chest-beating [and] emotionally exhausting ballad" that suits the throes of a turbulent relationship.

== Impact ==
In a 2013 UK survey, the song came first in a list of most popular songs to sing in the shower, above songs by Justin Bieber, Robbie Williams, One Direction and Elton John. In 2015, the song was voted by the British public as the nation's third-favourite 1980s number one in a poll for ITV.

Due to the song's lyrics comparing an ended romance with an eclipse, it often receives attention during solar and lunar eclipses. During the solar eclipse of 20 March 2015, Tyler's version received a 214% increase of Spotify streams throughout the day. A similar impact was experienced during the solar eclipse of 21 August 2017, when Nielsen Music reported a 503% increase in record sales., and the song hitting number one on the iTunes chart around the same time. The song again reached No. 1 on the iTunes sales chart in the US during the solar eclipse of 8 April 2024. In the following week, Tyler re-entered the Billboard Artist 100 chart at No. 79, and "Total Eclipse of the Heart" entered the LyricFind Global chart at No. 25, the Canadian Digital Song Sales chart at No. 9, and the US Digital Song Sales Chart at No. 5. This phenomenon was noted again during the solar eclipse of August 12 2026, with Spotify noting a 14 per cent boost in streaming of the song worldwide, including a 94 per cent rise in the UK on 12 August.

As of July 2026, the song has sold 1.9 million copies in the United States, and has surpassed 1 billion streams on Spotify.

== Formats and track listings ==
- UK 7-inch single
1. "Total Eclipse of the Heart" – 4:29
2. "Take Me Back" – 5:05
- US 7-inch single
1. "Total Eclipse of the Heart" – 4:29
2. "Straight from the Heart" – 3:38
- UK 12-inch single
1. "Total Eclipse of the Heart" – 6:59
2. "Take Me Back" – 5:22

== Credits and personnel ==
Credits are adapted from AllMusic.

- Bonnie Tyler – lead vocals
- Rick Derringer – guitar
- Steve Buslowe – bass guitar
- Roy Bittan – piano
- Larry Fast – synthesizers
- Steve Margoshes – additional synthesizers
- Max Weinberg – drums
- Jimmy Maelen – percussion
- Rory Dodd – featured and backing vocals
- Eric Troyer, Holly Sherwood – backing vocals

== Charts ==
=== Weekly charts ===
Chart (1983)	Peak position
Australia (Kent Music Report)	1
Belgium (Ultratop 50 Flanders)	14
Canada (The Record)	2
Canada Top Singles (RPM)	1
Canada Adult Contemporary (RPM)	9
Denmark (BT/IFPI)	6
Europarade Top 40 (Music Week)	7
Europarade Euro Hit 40	6
Finland (Suomen virallinen lista)	6
France (IFOP)	3
Ireland (IRMA)	1
Italy (Musica e dischi)	17
Netherlands (Dutch Top 40)	24
Netherlands (Single Top 100)	18
New Zealand (Recorded Music NZ)	1
Norway (VG-lista)	1
Peru (UPI)	2
South Africa (Springbok Radio)	1
Spain (AFYVE)	9
Sweden (Sverigetopplistan)	3
Switzerland (Schweizer Hitparade)	3
UK Singles (Official Charts)	1
US Billboard Hot 100	1
US Adult Contemporary (Billboard)	7
US Mainstream Rock Airplay (Billboard)	23
US Cash Box Top 100	1
Venezuela (UPI)	4
West Germany (GfK)	16
Zimbabwe (ZIMA)	1

Year	Chart	Peak position
2008	UK Singles (Official Charts)	57
2011	Belgium (Back Catalogue Singles Flanders)	17
2011	Denmark (Tracklisten)	35
2012	France (SNEP)	57
2013	France (SNEP)	98
2014	France (SNEP)	114
2017	Canadian Digital Song Sales	38
2017	US Digital Songs (Billboard)	13
2017	US Pop Digital Songs Sales (Billboard)	8
2017	US Hot Canadian Pop Digital Songs Sales (Billboard)	38
2019	Hungary (Single Top 40)	29
2024	Canadian Digital Song Sales	9
2024	US Digital Songs (Billboard)	5
2024	US TikTok Billboard Top 50	13
2024	US LyricFind Global (Billboard)	25
2026	Australia On Replay Singles (ARIA)	13
2026	Austria (Ö3 Austria Top 40)	10
2026	Czech Republic Singles Digital (ČNS IFPI)	42
2026	Germany (GfK)	18
2026	Global 200 (Billboard)	51
2026	Greece International (IFPI)	35
2026	Ireland (IRMA)	36
2026	Israel International Airplay (Media Forest)	10
2026	Netherlands (Single Top 100)	86
2026	Netherlands Airplay (Dutch Charts)	47
2026	Norway (VG-lista)	78
2026	Panama Streaming (PRODUCE)	178
2026	Poland Streaming (OLiS)	67
2026	Portugal (AFP)	77
2026	Sweden (Sverigetopplistan)	36
2026	Switzerland (Schweizer Hitparade)	21
2026	UK Singles Chart (OCC)	29
2026	US Digital Songs (Billboard)	2

=== Year-end charts ===
Chart (1983)	Position
Australia (Kent Music Report)	6
Canada Top Singles (RPM)	5
France (IFOP)	15
New Zealand (RIANZ)	5
South Africa (Springbok Radio)	3
UK Singles (OCC)	5
US Billboard Hot 100	6
US Cash Box Top 100	5

=== All-time charts ===
Chart (1958–2018)	Position
US Billboard Hot 100	161

== Certifications and sales ==
Region	Certification	Certified units/sales
Australia (ARIA)	4× Platinum	280,000^{‡}
Canada (Music Canada)	Platinum	100,000^{^}
Denmark (IFPI Danmark)	Platinum	90,000^{‡}
France (SNEP)	Gold	500,000^{*}
Germany (BVMI)	Platinum	600,000^{‡}
Italy (FIMI)	Platinum	30,000^{‡}
New Zealand (RMNZ)	3× Platinum	90,000^{‡}
Portugal (AFP)	Gold	20,000^{‡}
Spain (Promusicae)	2× Platinum	120,000^{‡}
United Kingdom (BPI)	2× Platinum	1,200,000^{‡}
United States (RIAA)	Platinum	1,900,000
Streaming
Greece (IFPI Greece)	Platinum	2,000,000^{†}
Summaries
Worldwide	—	13,000,000
^{*} Sales figures based on certification alone.^{^} Shipments figures based on certification alone.^{‡} Sales+streaming figures based on certification alone.^{†} Streaming-only figures based on certification alone.

== Other versions by Bonnie Tyler ==
Since the original release in 1983, Tyler has re-recorded the song numerous times. In 2004, she released a duet version of the song with Peter Brocklehurst on his album For You. A solo version of the recording was released on her own studio album, Wings, the following year.

In January 2007, Tyler released another version of "Total Eclipse of the Heart" in collaboration with the British punk-electronic group BabyPinkStar. It peaked at no. 40 on the UK Independent Singles chart.

In 2009, Tyler released a version of the song with Welsh choral group Only Men Aloud!. In 2011, Tyler re-recorded the song on an EP named after the song, released by Cleopatra Records. In 2013, another version of the song was released as a bonus track from her album Rocks and Honey, available exclusively on the UK iTunes Store.

In 2021, Tyler released a classical-dance version of the song on Classical 80s Dance, an album by German producer Alex Christensen and the Berlin Orchestra.

In 2025, French DJ David Guetta and Hypaton released "Together", interpolating the chorus featuring re-recorded vocals by Tyler; this version charted in many countries and was certified gold in France.

=== Bonnie Tyler and Kareen Antonn version ===
"Si demain... (Turn Around)"

Single by Kareen Antonn and Bonnie Tyler

from the album Simply Believe
- Released: 19 December 2003
- Studio: Studio Pasteur (Paris, France)
- Length: 4:10 (album version); 3:54 (radio version)
- Label: Yanis
- Songwriters: Jim Steinman; Emmanuel Pribys
- Producers: Lynda Ramdane; Faouze Barkati; Krem Barkati; Wallid Barkati

Bonnie Tyler singles chronology
"Learning to Fly" (2003)	"Si demain... (Turn Around)" (2003)	"Si tout s'arrête (It' a Heartache)" (2004)

Kareen Antonn singles chronology
"Si demain... (Turn Around)" (2003)	"Si tout s'arrête (It' a Heartache)" (2004)

Music video
- "Si demain... (Turn Around)" on YouTube

In 2003, Tyler re-recorded "Total Eclipse of the Heart" as a bilingual duet with French singer Kareen Antonn. Produced by Faouze Barkati, Krem Barkati and Wallid Barkati, the track was named "Si demain... (Turn Around)". It was released on 19 December 2003 by Yanis Records and appears on Tyler's 14th studio album, Simply Believe (2004). The single topped the charts in France and Wallonia.

==== Background and release ====
The release date for "Si demain... (Turn Around)" was brought forward by three weeks due to unprecedented demand after the track received pre-release radio airplay. Tyler and Antonn filmed the music video in Québec, Canada. Behind-the-scenes footage was released on Tyler's concert film, Bonnie on Tour (2006).

Following the success of "Si demain... (Turn Around)", Tyler and Antonn released a second duet, "Si tout s'arrête (It's a Heartache)", on 7 June 2004.

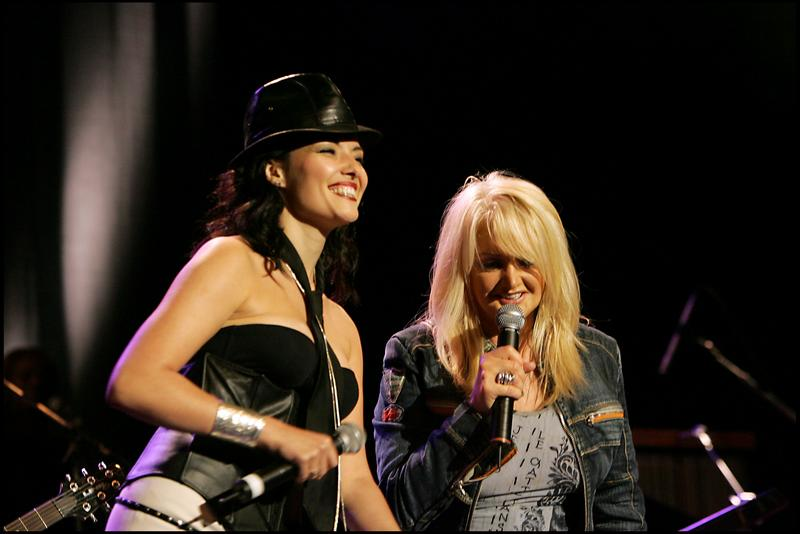
Bonnie Tyler and Kareen Antonn performing "Si demain... (Turn Around)" at La Cigale (Paris) on 8 June 2005.

==== Critical reception ====
In reviews, critics praised "Si demain... (Turn Around)" for its approach at re-recording a pre-established hit song. Platine, a French magazine, attributed the track's success to an emerging trend of "transborder duets" in 2004. Music charts analyst Elia Habib noted that "Si demain... (Turn Around)" is the first bilingual chart-topping single since "7 Seconds" by Youssou N'Dour and Neneh Cherry in 1994. Music Actu stated the song was "among the most popular singles of French public" upon release, and noted its performance on the French singles chart.

==== Formats and track listings ====
- Digital download (since 2005)

No.	Title	Length
1.	"Si demain... (Turn Around)" (radio version)	3:54
2.	"Si demain... (Turn Around)" (album version)	4:10
3.	"Si demain... (Turn Around)" (music video)	3:47
4.	"Si demain... (Turn Around)" (karaoke version)	3:54
5.	"Si demain... (Turn Around)" (karaoke with song)	3:47

- CD single (3 versions)

No.	Title	Length
1.	"Si demain... (Turn Around)" (radio version)	3:54
2.	"Si demain... (Turn Around)" (album version)	4:10
3.	"Si demain... (Turn Around)" (by Kareen Antonn)	3:52

==== Chart performances and sales ====
On the French SNEP Singles Chart, the single debuted at number 25 on 21 December 2003. It reached the top ten two weeks later and became number one in its fifth week. The single regained the number one spot on three occasions during the ten weeks at number one. It remained on the chart for 25 weeks, achieved Platinum status for over 500,000 copies sold, and was the fourth best-selling single of 2004 in France. "Si demain... (Turn Around)" is the only female duet number one single since the creation of French Top 50. It is also the single which made the biggest drop from number one, dropping directly to number ten. It also gave Bonnie Tyler the record of the longest time gap between top ten singles in France. Eighteen years passed between her hit "If You Were a Woman (And I Was a Man)" which reached number six in 1986 and of "Si demain... (Turn Around)", hitting number one. The previous record, by Marc Lavoine, was 17 years old.

In Belgium (Wallonia), the song went to number one two weeks after its debut at number 21, and remained number one from 21 February to 10 April 2004, i.e. eight weeks. It stayed in the top 40 for 24 weeks. It was certified Platinum after eleven weeks on the chart. It was the second best-selling single of 2004 and totaled 31 weeks on the chart. In Switzerland, the single peaked at number seven for four weeks and remained on the chart for 34 weeks. "Si demain... (Turn Around)" was also broadcast on radio in Russia and Poland where it reached number one on local radios as well as on the main chart. The song was number six on the 2004 International List of French-speaking Music, compiled in collaboration with 122 radio stations throughout the world.

As of August 2014, the song was the 26th-best-selling single of the 21st century in France, with 508,000 units sold. However, when she participated in the French show La Méthode Cauet, Kareen Antonn affirmed that the single, then still ranked on the French Singles Chart, had exceeded the 700,000 sold copies. Worldwide, the song has sold more than 2 million copies (physical sales and digital downloads).

==== Credits and personnel ====
- Music / Text : Jim Steinman, Emmanuel Pribys
- Producers : Faouze, Krem, Wallid Barkati
- Executive producer : Lynda Ramdane
- Artistic direction : Yanis Records
- French adaptation : Emmanuel Pribys
- Chorus : F. Llado, J.-N. Sombrun, F. Godebout, D. Goury, M. Ducret, J. Stage, B. Bishop
- Guitar : S. Heurtault, K. Rustam
- Bass : J. Stage

==== Charts ====
===== Weekly charts =====
2004 weekly chart performance for "Si demain... (Turn Around)"
Chart (2004)	Peak position
Belgium (Ultratop 50 Wallonia)	1
European Hot 100 Singles (Billboard)	4
France (SNEP)	1
Poland Airplay (TVP1)	1
Russia Airplay (TopHit)	154
Switzerland (Schweizer Hitparade)	7

2012 weekly chart performance for "Si demain... (Turn Around)"
Chart (2012)	Peak position
France (SNEP)	167

===== Year-end charts =====
Year-end chart performance for "Si demain... (Turn Around)"
Chart (2004)	Position
Belgium (Ultratop 50 Wallonia)	2
France (SNEP)	4
France Airplay (SNEP)	67
France TV Airplay (SNEP)	114
Switzerland (Schweizer Hitparade)	22

==== Certifications ====
Certifications and sales for "Si demain... (Turn Around)"
Region	Certification	Certified units/sales
Belgium (BRMA)	Platinum	50,000^{*}
France (SNEP)	Gold	250,000^{*}
^{‡} Sales+streaming figures based on certification alone.

==== Cover versions of "Si demain... (Turn Around)" ====
In 2004, Lucie and Sandy, two contestants of the French television show Star Academy 4, covered this song on one of the Friday weekly shows.

On 30 March 2004, on the Worldbest competition which brings together winners of various broadcasts of Star Academy, the two finalists, Wilfred Le Bouthillier and Marie-Élaine Thibert, performed "Si demain... (Turn Around)", gaining the second place. In 2005, they released the single in Canada under the title "Et si demain"; their version differs from "Si demain... (Turn Around)" as a verse was removed and there are more refrains toward the end of the song. They also performed "Et si demain" on 18 September 2004, on the show La Fureur on Radio-Canada, and on 19 April 2004 on TVA. Le Bouthillier and Thibert's version was in turn covered by K4T and Luc St-Pierre on the Canadian TV show Heure de Gloire.

In 2007, Isabelle Delobel and Olivier Schoenfelder, two French professional figure skaters, carried out their performance to "Si demain...(Turn Around)" in "Stars sur glace", at the Palais omnisports de Paris-Bercy, broadcast on Paris Première (the song features on the programme of their 2006–2007 figure skating season).

== Nicki French version ==
"Total Eclipse of the Heart"
- One of artwork variants for UK single release, also used for a few non-UK releases

Single by Nicki French

from the album Secrets
- Released: 3 October 1994
- Genre: Eurodance; hi-NRG
- Length: 3:50
- Label: Bags of Fun; Love This; Mega
- Songwriter: Jim Steinman
- Producers: Mike Stock; Matt Aitken

Nicki French singles chronology
"Total Eclipse of the Heart" (1994)	"For All We Know" (1995)

Music video
- "Total Eclipse of the Heart" on YouTube

English singer Nicki French released a hi-NRG remake of "Total Eclipse of the Heart" in October 1994 that was also a worldwide hit. It was included on her debut album, Secrets (1995). The song originally peaked at No. 54 on the UK Singles Chart in 1994 but reached No. 5 after being re-issued in January 1995. In the United States, French's version peaked at No. 2 on the Billboard Hot 100, and it garnered frequent airplay on AC radio. It enjoyed greater success in Australia, spending four nonconsecutive weeks at No. 2. Elsewhere, the cover reached number four in Israel, number 13 in New Zealand, number 16 in Canada, and peaked within the top 10 of several European countries.

=== Background and release ===
French had made her first dance version recording of "Total Eclipse of the Heart" in 1994: she had purchased the Bonnie Tyler original as a teenager in 1983 and reacted negatively to the original suggestion that she (French) remake the song as a dance track — "I thought, no, it's too strong a song to go down the dance route. You know, it demeans it almost. But then I thought well, I'll give it a go. And as soon as I heard the track, I thought it actually does work." The singer had been performing in London bands since the age of 12 and was given the chance to record a version when she received a phone call from a fellow British musician. French's first recording of "Total Eclipse of the Heart", made with John Springate of the Glitter Band producing, came to the attention of Mike Stock and Matt Aitken, who produced their own recording of the song by French, and it was this version which appeared on the UK chart dated 15 October 1994 at No. 54. French would recall: "I just thought oh well that was great...I've [worked with] Mike Stock and Matt Aitken and it was a dream come true...we tried and I had a great time...And then about two months later I had a call out of the blue from Mike saying the buzz will not die down on this track so we're going to re-record the beginning...and we're going to re-release it at the beginning of 1995."

According to French, her remake of "Total Eclipse of the Heart" became popular in the UK and the US in distinct remixes: "the slower version was the one that actually took a hold in the UK, where originally they started with the fast one and then decided to go with the [remix which began] in the same vein as the Bonnie Tyler version [and then] sped up when the chorus came in...In the US it was the [remix] which was fast all the way through." The single earned French two awards at the 1995 Hi-NRG Music Awards, in the categories for "Single of the Year" and "Best Female Vocal Performance". In 1996, the song was named "Best Hi-NRG 12-inch of the Year" at the International Dance Music Awards in Miami.

=== Music video ===
The song's accompanying music video features French performing on a stage, in front of a giant, circular "moon" that occasionally draws up to eclipse itself. Smoke appear as "clouds" and she is backed up by a band and two female backup singers. Sometimes a dancer also performs in front of the "moon". An alternate video also exists, set to the slower version of the song. "Total Eclipse of the Heart" was a Box Top on British music television channel The Box in February 1995.

=== Critical reception ===
AllMusic editor Stephen Thomas Erlewine remarked that French "had a unexpected hit single with her dance-club, house-inflected cover" of "Total Eclipse of the Heart". He added that "although it was treated like a novelty at first, the version was as effective as the original and was a deserved success." Larry Flick from Billboard magazine stated that the singer "does a fair imitation of Bonnie Tyler on this bouncy hi-NRG/disco interpretation of the bombastic power ballad. U.K. and European punters already have warmly embraced this twirler, and odds are an even 50-50 for similar success here." American entertainment company BuzzFeed ranked French's version number 26 in their "The 101 Greatest Dance Songs of the '90s" list in 2017.

Steve Baltin from Cash Box felt that in the new version, "only the radio edit retains the syrupy feel that made Tyler's song such a smash. 'Total Eclipse of the Heart' seems like it would be an odd choice for a dance cover, and this version confirms that suspicion... but it's still a hit." Dave Sholin from the Gavin Report named it Record To Watch, writing, "The song that never dies gets a '90s facelift and a tempo injection. Ten more believers." Robbie Daw from Idolator described it as a "simmering dance rendition", including it in their "The 50 Best Pop Singles of 1995" list in 2015. In his weekly UK chart commentary, James Masterton said it "suffers from the inevitable dance beat tacked on and also the lack of Jim Steinman's bombastic production that made the track such an epic in the first place." Pan-European magazine Music & Media noted, "Away is the sandpaper vocal of Bonny Tyler [sic], the edge now comes from the dance context put into the ballad. Needless to say it's an upbeat song anno 1995. Top 10 in the UK."

=== Charts ===
==== Weekly charts ====
Chart (1994)	Peak position
Scottish Singles Sales (Official Charts)	50
UK Singles (Official Charts)	54
UK Dance (Music Week)	6

Chart (1995)	Peak position
Australia (ARIA)	2
Belgium (Ultratop 50 Flanders)	14
Canada Retail Singles (The Record)	2
Canada Top Singles (RPM)	16
Canada Adult Contemporary (RPM)	17
Canada Dance/Urban (RPM)	1
Denmark (IFPI)	17
Europe (Eurochart Hot 100)	21
Germany (GfK)	65
Iceland (Íslenski Listinn Topp 40)	5
Ireland (IRMA)	15
Israel (Israeli Singles Chart)	4
Netherlands (Dutch Top 40)	7
Netherlands (Single Top 100)	10
New Zealand (Recorded Music NZ)	13
Quebec (ADISQ)	9
Scottish Singles Sales (Official Charts)	4
UK Singles (Official Charts)	5
UK Pop Tip Club Chart (Music Week)	5
US Billboard Hot 100	2
US Adult Contemporary (Billboard)	20
US Adult Top 40 (Billboard)	36
US Dance Club Play (Billboard)	37
US Maxi-Singles Sales (Billboard)	5
US Top 40/Mainstream (Billboard)	1
US Top 40/Rhythm-Crossover (Billboard)	12
US Cash Box Top 100	3

Chart (2024)	Peak position
US Dance Singles Sales (Billboard)	8

==== Year-end charts ====
Chart (1995)	Position
Australia (ARIA)	17
Belgium (Ultratop 50 Flanders)	80
Brazil (Crowley)	50
Canada Dance/Urban (RPM)	7
Iceland (Íslenski Listinn Topp 40)	87
Latvia (Latvijas Top 50)	162
Netherlands (Dutch Top 40)	80
Netherlands (Single Top 100)	90
UK Singles (OCC)	48
US Billboard Hot 100	19
US Maxi-Singles Sales (Billboard)	20
US Top 40/Mainstream (Billboard)	16
US Cash Box Top 100	27

=== Sales and certifications ===
Region	Certification	Certified units/sales
Australia (ARIA)	Platinum	70,000^{^}
United Kingdom (BPI)	Silver	200,000^{^}
United States (RIAA)	Gold	600,000
^{^} Shipments figures based on certification alone.

== Other cover versions ==
=== Lissette version ===
Cuban-American singer Lissette covered the song in Spanish as "Eclipse Total del Amor" in 1984, from her album Caricatura, being her best hit in the Latin American charts. The secondary male voice was sung by Cuban-American singer Jon Secada.

=== Jan Wayne version ===
German electronic dance music producer Jan Wayne released his version in 2001. It peaked at No. 24 on the Irish Singles Chart and at No. 28 on the UK Singles Chart in 2003.

=== Yuridia version ===
Mexican singer Yuridia covered the song in Spanish as "Eclipse Total del Amor" from her second studio album Habla El Corazón in 2006. The single peaked at number 36 on the Billboard Latin Pop Songs chart.

=== Westlife version ===
"Total Eclipse of the Heart"

Promotional single by Westlife

from the album The Love Album
- Released: 2007
- Length: 4:40
- Label: Sony BMG
- Songwriter: Jim Steinman

Audio video
- "Total Eclipse of the Heart" on YouTube

Irish boy band Westlife recorded a cover of the song on their 2006 album The Love Album. The song was to be released as the album's second single but was cancelled due to their Love Tour conflicts. Three official remixes were produced for their version as well as a remix done by Jim Steinman, which was ultimately rejected by the record label but has since surfaced on the Internet. The song was released as a promotional single in 2007. The Sunset Strippers Radio Mix version of the song charted at number 210 on the Official Russian Top Radio Hits Chart on 26 February 2007. It was composed in the traditional verse–chorus form in Bb major, with Filan and Feehily's vocal ranging from the chords of C_{4} to C_{6}.

Promotional CD single

1. "Total Eclipse of the Heart" (Sunset Strippers Verse Club Mix)
2. "Total Eclipse of the Heart" (Sunset Strippers Dub Mix)
3. "Total Eclipse of the Heart" (Sunset Strippers Radio Edit)

=== L'Aura version ===
Italian singer L'Aura covered the song in Italian as "Eclissi del cuore" from her third studio album Sei come me in 2010, which was not originally released as a single. One year later, a new version of the song, now a duet with fellow Italian singer Nek was officially released as a single, this duet peaking at number 6 on the Italian charts.

=== Glee cast version ===
The hit musical comedy-drama series Glee reworked the song for its season one episode "Bad Reputation," recorded by cast members Lea Michele, Cory Monteith, Mark Salling, and special guest star Jonathan Groff as their characters Rachel Berry, Finn Hudson, Noah Puckerman, and Jesse St. James respectively. It was released as a single and reached number 17 in Canada, 28 in Australia, 9 in the UK, and 16 in the US. It appears in the soundtrack album Glee: The Music, Volume 3 Showstoppers.

=== Doro version ===
On October 27, 2023, Doro Pesch released a cover featuring Rob Halford of Judas Priest from her album Conqueress – Forever Strong And Proud. It peaked at no. 96 on the UK Physical Singles chart.

=== Parody versions ===
A parody of the song and music video were published in 2009, in what the fans and makers call a "literal video version", which is a type of video that replaces the original song lyrics with humorous lyrics describing the images in the video. Time magazine listed it as the 6th best viral video of 2009. This was also the 6th literal video produced by professional video editor David A. Scott Jr.; the singer who performed for this re-dub was Scott's friend Felisha Noble using the pseudonym Persephone Maewyn.

In 2010, Tyler appeared in an advertisement for MasterCard, performing a short parody of the song with its noted new lyric "Turn around, Neville." She performed the original song in a similar advertisement for Westpac in 2012.

Warby Parker produced a parody video in anticipation of the solar eclipse of 21 August 2017.

The Marsh Family, a couple with four children in Faversham, Kent, produced a parody titled "Totally Fixed Where We Are" expressing the feelings of people under a third lockdown during the COVID-19 pandemic, which went viral in February 2021.

In 2019, in the Canta Uma Para Mim segment on Brazilian television program Alerta Amazonas, the song was performed by contestant Priscila Munhoes, who did not know how to speak English, and instead substituted her own "gibberish" lyrics. Munhoes was eliminated from the program, but the video of her performance went viral on the internet.

In Star Trek: Strange New Worlds (2026), Human Best Friend (S4E3), the character Una Chin-Riley, also known as Number One (portrayed by Rebecca Romijn) sings Total Eclipse of the Heart in Klingon.

== See also ==
- 1983 in British music
- List of Billboard Hot 100 number-one singles of 1983
- List of Billboard Mainstream Top 40 number-one songs of the 1990s
- List of Cash Box Top 100 number-one singles of 1983
- List of number-one singles of 1983 (Australia)
- List of number-one singles of 1983 (Canada)
- List of number-one singles of 1983 (Ireland)
- List of number-one singles from the 1980s (New Zealand)
- List of RPM number-one dance singles of 1995
- List of UK Singles Chart number ones of the 1980s
- VG-lista 1964 to 1994
- List of French number-one hits of 2004
- Ultratop 40 number-one hits of 2004
