= Heart Strings (Bonnie Tyler album) =

Studio album by Bonnie Tyler
- Released: 18 March 2003
- Recorded: June–September 2002
- Genre: Pop rock
- Length: 56:56
- Label: CMC; Grapefruit
- Producer: David Aspden; Matt Prior

Bonnie Tyler chronology
All in One Voice (1998)	Heart Strings (2003)	Simply Believe (2004)

Singles from Heart Strings
- 1. "Amazed" Released: 17 February 2003 (EU); 2. "Against All Odds" Released: 2003 (EU)

Heart Strings (originally titled Heart & Soul - 13 Rock Classics) is the thirteenth studio album by Welsh singer Bonnie Tyler. It was first released in Scandinavia under the title Heart & Soul on 28 October 2002 by CMC, a Danish record label. The album received a wider European release on 18 March 2003. The album features thirteen cover songs recorded with the City of Prague Philharmonic Orchestra and Tyler's band.

== Background ==
EMI proposed a one-off deal to record an album of cover songs with the City of Prague Philharmonic Orchestra and Tyler's live band, which included John Young, Alan Darby, Matt Prior, Thomas Lang, John Tonks and Ed Poole. Tyler picked out thirteen tracks to record, most of which were originally performed by male artists. Tyler thought about recording songs by some of her favourite female artists, including Janis Joplin and Tina Turner, but felt that she would not be able to improve on their interpretations.

The album booklet includes a credit to Arthur Fufkin, a reference to the fictional character Artie Fufkin from the 1984 mockumentary This Is Spinal Tap.

== Recording ==
The album was recorded between June and September 2002. Tyler began by recording guide vocals accompanied by an acoustic guitar. The orchestra was recorded over one week at the Barrandov Studios and Smecky Music Studios in Prague, Czech Republic. Tyler then returned to the UK to record additional vocals with her band at Ridge Farm, the Engine Room, Startrack Studios and Darby Studios. Part-way through the recording process, the original producer left the project and Tyler's manager David Aspden and guitarist Matt Prior then stepped in.

== Music ==
Heart Strings is an album of covers combining orchestral and rock instruments. The album also features gospel and blues influences on tracks like "Lean on Me" and "Need Your Love So Bad".

== Release and promotion ==
A promotional photo and video shoot was taken at the Thingbæk Kalkminer, an old limestone mine turned museum near Skørping, Denmark. Tyler embarked on a 9-date tour of Germany to promote the album between April and May 2003. In June 2003, Tyler performed a headline set at Donauinselfest in Vienna, Austria. Tyler promoted the album on various European TV networks including ARD, ZDF, Sat.1, RTL, TF1 and TV4.

"Amazed" was released as the album's only single in 2002. "Against All Odds (Take a Look at Me Now)" and "Learning to Fly" were released as promotional singles in 2002 and 2003 respectively.

The album was first released in Scandinavia under the title Heart and Soul - 13 Rock Classics on 28 October 2002 by the Danish label CMC. The album received a wider release under the title Heart Strings on 18 March 2003.

== Track listing ==
No.	Title	Writer(s)	Length
1.	"Human Touch"	Bruce Springsteen	4:32
2.	"Everybody Hurts"	Bill Berry; Peter Buck; Mike Mills; Michael Stipe	5:53
3.	"Amazed"	Marv Green; Chris Lindsey; Aimee Mayo	4:07
4.	"Against All Odds (Take a Look at Me Now)"	Phil Collins	4:08
5.	"And I Am Telling You I'm Not Going"	Tom Eyen; Henry Krieger	4:09
6.	"Lean on Me"	Bill Withers	4:37
7.	"In My Life"	John Lennon; Paul McCartney	2:59
8.	"Learning to Fly"	Jeff Lynne; Tom Petty	3:57
9.	"Right Here Waiting"	Richard Marx	4:14
10.	"I Still Haven't Found What I'm Looking For"	Bono; The Edge; Adam Clayton; Larry Mullen, Jr.	4:14
11.	"I Can't Make You Love Me"	Mike Reid; Allen Shamblin	4:36
12.	"Need Your Love So Bad"	Little Willie John; Mertis John Jr.	5:16
13.	"It's Over"	Bill Dees; Roy Orbison	4:15
Total length:			56:56

== Charts ==
Chart (2002–2003)	Peak position
Austrian Albums (Ö3 Austria)	32
French Albums (SNEP)	75
German Albums (Offizielle Top 100)	41
Norwegian Albums (VG-lista)	29
Spanish Albums (AFYVE)	41
Swedish Albums (Sverigetopplistan)	34

== Personnel ==
- Bonnie Tyler – vocals, violin
- David Aspden – keyboards
- Matt Prior – keyboards, guitars, acoustic guitar
- Alan Darby – guitars, rhythm guitar, acoustic guitar, slide guitar, dobro, arrangements (4)
- Ed Poole – electric bass, fretless bass
- Paul Turner – electric bass
- Thomas Lang – drums
- John Tonks – drums
- Thomas Dyani – percussion
- James McNally – bodhrán, low whistle
- City of Prague Philharmonic Orchestra – orchestra
- Nick Ingman – arrangements (1, 3, 7, 8, 9)
- Karl Jenkins – arrangements (2, 5, 6, 12, 13), conductor, score (11)
- John Young – arrangements (4, 11)
- Gerald McBurney – arrangements (10)
- Sam Brown – backing vocals
- Margot Buchanan – backing vocals
- Rita Campbell – backing vocals
- Claudia Fontaine – backing vocals
- Aitch McRobbie – backing vocals

=== Production ===
- David Aspden – producer, engineer
- Matt Prior – producer, engineer, editing
- Helen Atkinson – engineer
- Alan Darby – engineer
- Jan Holzner – engineer
- Richard "Dread" Mann – engineer
- Morten Munch – engineer, editing
- Michael Wolff – engineer
- Philip Allen – assistant engineer
- Nick Davis – mixing
- Søren Bundgaard – editing
- Dave Meegan – editing
- Tim Young – mastering
- Nils Krogh – photography
- Stefan Klein – artwork
