= Sophia Arvaniti =

Greek singer

Sophia Arvaniti Σοφία Αρβανίτη
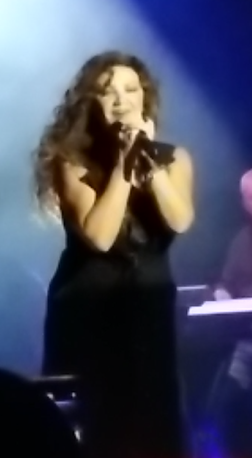

Background information
- Birth name: Sophia Arvanitidou
- Born: May 4, 1968 (age 56); Athens, Greece
- Origin: Greece
- Genres: Rock; pop
- Instrument: Vocals
- Years active: 1978–present
- Labels: RCA; Music Box International; Rain Music; Heaven Music

Sophia Arvaniti (Greek: Σοφία Αρβανίτη), (May 4, 1968) is a Greek singer. Her second album, Μη Μου Μιλάς Για Καλοκαίρια (1990), was certified Gold in Greece for sales of over 50,000 units.

Arvaniti is best known outside Greece for her 1992 single "The Desert Is in Your Heart" with Bonnie Tyler, which features on Arvaniti's album Parafora (Παράφορα).

== Discography ==
- Το Όνομα Μου Είναι Σοφία (1988)
- Μη Μου Μιλάς Για Καλοκαίρια (1990)
- Παράφορα (1992)
- Ζωή Σαν Πορτοκάλι (1993)
- Στον Αέρα (1994)
- Η Αγάπη Τα Πάντα Νικάει (1995)
- Καινούρια Μέρα (1996)
- Κόκκινη Κλωστή (1998)
- Συμπτωματικά (2000)
- Χωρίς Retouche (2009)
- Αλαβαρντάχαλα (Τραγούδια Των Καιρών) (2017)
