= Wings (Bonnie Tyler album) =

Studio album by Bonnie Tyler
- Released: 14 April 2005
- Recorded: 2004–05
- Genre: Pop rock
- Length: 57:53
- Label: Stick Music
- Producer: John Stage

Bonnie Tyler chronology
| Simply Believe (2004) | Wings (2005) | From the Heart: Greatest Hits (2007) |

Celebrate cover
- Cover art for the 2006 UK release, entitled Celebrate

Singles from Wings
- 1. "Louise" Released: 12 June 2006

Professional ratings
Review scores
| Source | Rating |
|---|---|
| AllMusic | link |

Wings is the fifteenth studio album by Welsh singer Bonnie Tyler. It was released in France on 14 April 2005 by Stick Music, and on 22 May 2006 in the UK under the title Celebrate. The album was produced by Jean Lahcène, under the pseudonym John Stage, at Studio Pasteur in Paris. Two of the tracks were written and produced by Stuart Emerson, with Lorraine Crosby providing guest vocals on "I'll Stand by You". Wings features two re-recordings of Tyler's hits "Total Eclipse of the Heart" and "It's a Heartache", and Tyler is credited as the co-lyricist of several of the album's tracks.

"Louise" was released as the album's only single in 2006. Wings spent two weeks in the French Albums Chart, with a peak placing at no. 133.

== Background, recording and release ==
In January 2004, Tyler was number one in France with her bilingual song "Si demain... (Turn Around)", which boosted sales of her then-current studio album Simply Believe. Still working in France, Tyler went on to collaborate with French producer Jean Lahcene to put together another album. Wings was released on 14 April 2005, and would be her last album for eight years before the release of Rocks and Honey. Tyler co-wrote nine of the tracks for Wings; this was the first time in Tyler's career that she had been directly involved in the composition of her songs. The album was recorded at the Pasteur Studio in Paris, France, and "All I Need Is Love" and "I'll Stand By You" were recorded at Stuart Emerson's studio in the UK. Wings features two tracks written by Stuart Emerson, one of which was a duet with his partner and Tyler's friend, Lorraine Crosby. Emerson also contributed to Tyler's 1995 album Free Spirit and 2004 album Simply Believe. Two of the tracks, "Louise" and "Celebrate" are also featured on the album in French.

Wings was released in Norway on 3 June 2005. Tyler visited the headquarters of Verdens Gang in Oslo to perform two acoustic versions of "Louise" and "Wings" in a live broadcast on their website.

Wings was released in the United Kingdom under the title Celebrate in 2006. The UK version omitted the French versions of the two singles.

Other releases including live performances of songs from Wings include the DVD Bonnie on Tour (2006), the live CD Bonnie Tyler Live (2006) and The Complete Bonnie Tyler (2007); a CD and DVD pack that included Tyler's DVD Bonnie on Tour and Wings.

In November 2019, Tyler re-recorded "Streets of Stone" with producer David Mackay in support of the World's Big Sleep Out, a charity event supporting the homeless. The lyrics were edited by the organiser, Phil Sprey, and the track was released in December 2019.

== Critical reception ==
The album received a mixed review from Tomas Mureika of AllMusic. He described the album as "safe", and added that it "serves as a herald that Tyler should be re-teaming with a producer of Jim Steinman's caliber to bring out the best in her inimitable voice." After pointing out that the album did have some high points, he concluded that the album was, however, forgettable.

When released in the UK as Celebrate, Elly Roberts (of Glasswerk Magazine) praised the album. She said: "The voice, as unique as you'll find by a female singer, is as coarse as ever. Her band is as hot as anything on the scene (the lead guitarist is outstanding), with superb production at every level." Talking about the track "Run Run Run", she described it as a "typical chart friendly affair, full of wailing guitar solos, and a catchy chorus that would grace any party dancefloor", and predicted that the track could possibly become her next anthem.

== Promotion ==
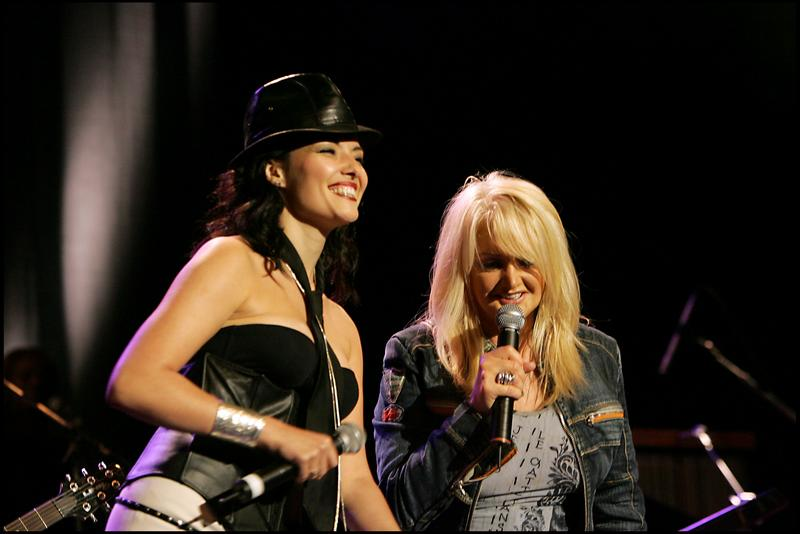
Kareen Antonn with Bonnie Tyler live at La Cigale in Paris, France, 8 June 2005.

=== Singles ===
The album's single "Louise" was released in France in 2005 and then was released in UK to promote Celebrate on 12 June 2006. Tyler recorded a music video for this single in a shipwreck on the coast of Tunisia, which was released on the CD single.

On 15 May 2020, Tyler released a remix of "I'll Stand by You", retitled as "Through Thick and Thin (I'll Stand by You)", with Lorraine Crosby as a charity single in aid of the Teenage Cancer Trust. It reached no. 64 on the UK Downloads Chart and Singles Sales Charts.

=== Television and touring ===
The BBC produced an episode of On Show about Bonnie Tyler entitled "In One Voice". The episode is a short documentary about Tyler's career, and was published a few months ahead of the release of Wings. Tyler performed several of the album tracks at La Cigale in Paris on her birthday on 8 June 2005. The concert was filmed and released as part of a DVD entitled Bonnie on Tour, and also on a live CD called Bonnie Tyler Live, both released in 2006. She also performed some of the tracks at the 2005 Sopot International Song Festival.

Tyler had two touring bands between 2004 and 2006; her regular band that she first formed in the 1990s, and a French band that toured Wings with her.

== Track listing ==
Wings — European release
| No. | Title | Writer(s) | Length |
|---|---|---|---|
| 1. | "Louise" | Paul D. Fitzgerald; Bonnie Tyler; John Stage^{[a]} | 3:45 |
| 2. | "Celebrate" | Karen Drotar; Tyler; Serge Haouzi; Stage^{[a]} | 2:55 |
| 3. | "Driving Me Crazy" | Drotar; Tyler; Erick Stezycki; St James II^{[a]} | 3:20 |
| 4. | "Hold Out Your Heart" | Fitzgerald; Tyler; St James II^{[a]} | 3:52 |
| 5. | "Run Run Run" | Drotar; Tyler; Haouzi; Stage^{[a]} | 3:26 |
| 6. | "Wings" | Fitzgerald; Tyler; Olivier Renoir | 4:02 |
| 7. | "It's a Heartache" (New version) | Ronnie Scott; Steve Wolfe | 3:19 |
| 8. | "Stand Up" | Arnaud de Rozenblat; Y. Shah; Tyler; Stage^{[a]} | 3:32 |
| 9. | "Crying in Berlin" | Fitzgerald; Tyler; Stage^{[a]} | 3:34 |
| 10. | "Total Eclipse of the Heart" (New version) | Jim Steinman | 3:50 |
| 11. | "I'll Stand by You" (with Lorraine Crosby) | Stuart Emerson | 4:17 |
| 12. | "All I Need Is Love" | Emerson | 4:46 |
| 13. | "I Won't Look Back" | Fitzgerald; Tyler; St James II^{[a]} | 3:35 |
| 14. | "Streets of Stone" | Fitzgerald; Tyler; St James II^{[a]} | 3:27 |
| 15. | "Chante avec moi" | Drotar; Tyler; Haouzi; Stage^{[a]} | 2:55 |
| 16. | "Louise (Il est mon homme)" | Fitzgerald; Tyler; Stage^{[a]} | 3:45 |

=== Note ===
- ^a Pseudonym for Jean Lahcène

Celebrate — UK release
| No. | Title | Length |
|---|---|---|
| 1. | "Driving Me Crazy" | 3:26 |
| 2. | "All I Need Is Love" | 3:31 |
| 3. | "Louise" | 3:50 |
| 4. | "Hold Out Your Heart" | 4:05 |
| 5. | "Run Run Run" | 3:34 |
| 6. | "Wings" | 4:12 |
| 7. | "Celebrate" | 3:02 |
| 8. | "I Won't Look Back" | 3:42 |
| 9. | "Stand Up" | 3:41 |
| 10. | "Crying in Berlin" | 3:43 |
| 11. | "Streets of Stone" | 3:36 |
| 12. | "I'll Stand By You" | 4:17 |

Celebrate — Bonus tracks
| No. | Title | Length |
|---|---|---|
| 13. | "Louise" (Music video) |
| 14. | "It's a Heartache" (Live at La Cigale) |

== Charts ==
| Chart (2005) | Peak position |
|---|---|
| French Albums (SNEP) | 133 |

== Personnel ==
Credits adapted from AllMusic:

- Producer, executive producer - John Stage
- Management - Lionel Ducos
- Engineers - Stuart Emerson, Saint James II, John Stage
- Programming - Fred Andrews, Stuart Emerson, Fab, Saint James II, John Stage
- Photography - Ducs, Bertrand Levet, John Stage, Robert Sullivan
- Artwork - Pop at Work
- International coordination - Karen Drotar
- Keyboards - Fred Andrews, Didier Collet, Stuart Emerson, Saint James II, Laurent Meliz, John Stage
- Drums - Tom Box, Stuart Emerson
- Bass guitar - Stuart Emerson, Jannick Top
- Guitar - Stuart Emerson, Sebastien Heurtault, Eric "Zycki" Stezycki
- Bagpipes - Loïc Taillebrest
- Soloist - Lorraine Crosby
- Backing vocals - Lorraine Crosby, Karen Drotar, Stuart Emerson, F. Godebout, D. Goury, Serge Haouzi, Laura Lahcene, Fanny Llado, J.J. Sombrun, John Stage
