= Peter Brocklehurst =

Australian singer and author

- Years active: 1961−present

Peter Brocklehurst is an Australian singer and author.

== Early years ==
Peter Brocklehurst is one of eight children. His family immigrated to Australia in the early 1960s. Brocklehurst grew up listening to Mario Lanza with dreams of becoming a classical singer. Brocklehurst never attended high school and had his innocence wrenched away when, as young children, he and his sister were abducted and abused for several days before being released.

He grew up fruit picking, repairing shoe and singing in cover bands.

In 1979, the Brocklehurst family settled in Warrnambool and Peter gained attention on the local music scene performing in south-west rock bands such as Limited Edition, Working Class Hero and Skyline.

At twenty-five years old Peter was working in a shoe repair business in Melbourne and fronting rock and roll cover bands.

== Career ==
In 2003, Brocklehurst released his debut album, Boots + All.

== Discography ==
=== Studio albums ===
List of albums, with selected chart positions
Title	Album details	Peak chart positions
Title	Album details	AUS
Boots and All	Released: October 2003; Format: CD; Label: Sony Classical (5135612000)	62
If You Feel Like Singing	Released: November 2004; Format: CD; Label: Sony Classical (5187322000)	51

== Books ==
Finding My Voice (2004)
