= Faouze Barkati =

French songwriter

Faouze Barkati is a French music producer and songwriter working with Yanis Records France and credited for popularizing the kuduro music and dance in Europe worldwide. Through his friendship since childhood with Lucenzo, he took an Angolan dance form he had been introduced to 25 years earlier through his travels, and convinced Lucenzo and his second producer Fabrice Toïgo to launch the genre by adapting kuduro with catchy fusion of Portuguese and European elements.

Faouze Barkati went on to produce many songs for Lucenzo most notably "Vem Dançar Kuduro" a big dance hit in France and the basis of the international hit "Danza Kuduro" by Don Omar & Lucenzo, where he was also credited. The new Don Omar version was also featured in the film Fast Five.

For almost a decade, Faouze Barkati has worked with other artists including credits as executive producer for 2001 hit "Only Thing I Need" by DJ Abdel feat. Jérome Prister and Doudou Masta.
