= Here She Comes =

1984 single by Welsh singer Bonnie Tyler

Single by Bonnie Tyler

from the album Metropolis (Music from the Motion Picture)
- B-side: "Time"
- Released: 15 October 1984
- Recorded: 1984
- Genre: Pop rock
- Length: 3:48 5:35 (extended version 12") 3:28 (single version)
- Label: CBS; Columbia
- Songwriters: Giorgio Moroder; Peter Bellote
- Producer: Giorgio Moroder

Bonnie Tyler singles chronology
"Holding Out for a Hero" (1984)	"Here She Comes" (1984)	"Loving You's a Dirty Job but Somebody's Gotta Do It" (1985)

Music video
- "Here She Comes" on YouTube

"Here She Comes" is a song recorded by Welsh singer Bonnie Tyler for the soundtrack to the 1984 restoration version of the 1927 German film Metropolis. It was released in 1984 by CBS Records, written by Giorgio Moroder and Peter Bellote, and produced by Moroder. Tyler re-recorded the song on her 2004 album Simply Believe.

The song charted highest in Austria, peaking at number 13. At the 27th Grammy Awards, "Here She Comes" was nominated for Best Female Rock Vocal Performance, marking Tyler's third and final Grammy nomination of her career, following her two nominations in the previous year.

In 2026, the song features in Catherine Zeta Jones series Kill Jackie. It is played in the final episode of the Swansea episode (episode 5) as Jackie Price is seen leaving Swansea in a classic MGBGT.

== Critical reception ==
Moroder's soundtrack to Metropolis was widely criticised by reviewers, but "Here She Comes" was frequently noted as one of the strongest tracks. In The Pittsburgh Press', Jim Davidson described the usage of "Here She Comes" as "the only right-on-the-money correlation of music and image." Bruce Bailey of the Montreal Gazette said that the song was so strong that it should be released as a single. In a four out of four star review of the soundtrack for the Reno Gazette-Journal, Eric McClary stated that it was a "mystery" that "Here She Comes" never became a hit in the United States. In The Age, Mike Daly described Tyler's performance as "sensational" and noted the track's "powerful, slow rock accompaniment". Cyndi Glass of the Vincennes Sun-Commercial described "Here She Comes" as a "compelling emotional song".

== Music video ==
Tyler filmed a music video for "Here She Comes" in 1984, directed by Brian Johnson. The video was investigated by the British Independent Broadcasting Authority due to its frequent use of the Renault 5 car.

=== Synopsis ===
The video is set in London. Tyler, dressed in a black leather dress, walks down a cobbled road lined with statues of soldiers. She occasionally looks up to see a duplicate of herself, dressed in a white dress, standing at the top of a fire escape, shrouded in shadow. The statues come to life and follow Tyler down the road. Behind them follows a black car, driven by the duplicate of Tyler. She runs away from them as she notices the statues following her, and locks herself inside a garage. The car then breaks through the doors of the garage and attempts to run Tyler over. She escapes through another door and finds herself on a street, looking up to see a spaceship in the sky. The spaceship descends, and a car appears, which Tyler enters and drives away. The duplicate chases after Tyler in her own car. Tyler drives into another building, and as the spaceship flies above the building, the duplicate drives inside as the entrance explodes. The spaceship then flies away as the animated statues look on.

== Charts ==
Chart (1984–1985)	Peak position
Austria (Ö3 Austria Top 40)	13
European Hot 100 Singles (Music & Media)	51
France (SNEP)	32
Germany (GfK)	43
UK Singles (Official Charts)	98
US Billboard Hot 100	76
US Cash Box Top 100	81
