= Loving You's a Dirty Job but Somebody's Gotta Do It =

1985 single by Bonnie Tyler and Todd Rundgren

Single by Bonnie Tyler and Todd Rundgren

from the album Secret Dreams and Forbidden Fire
- B-side: "Under Suspicion"; "It's a Jungle Out There"
- Released: 11 November 1985
- Length: 7:48; 5:40 (7-inch)
- Label: CBS
- Songwriter: Jim Steinman
- Producer: Jim Steinman

Bonnie Tyler singles chronology
"Here She Comes" (1984)	"Loving You's a Dirty Job but Somebody's Gotta Do It" (1985)	"If You Were a Woman (And I Was a Man)" (1986)

Todd Rundgren singles chronology
"Bang the Drum All Day" (1983)	"Loving You's a Dirty Job but Somebody's Gotta Do It" (1985)

Music video
- "Loving You's a Dirty Job (But Somebody's Gotta Do It)" on YouTube

"Loving You's a Dirty Job but Somebody's Gotta Do It" is a song recorded by Welsh singer Bonnie Tyler and American singer Todd Rundgren. Written and produced by Jim Steinman, the track was released as the lead single from Tyler's sixth studio album, Secret Dreams and Forbidden Fire (1986), in November 1985.

The single artwork featured paintings by the British artist Edward Burne-Jones. 12-inch editions feature the cover painting The Beguiling of Merlin, while 7-inch editions feature Phyllis and Demophoon. Some territories feature a photograph of Tyler.

== Music video ==
The official music video of the song was directed by Tim Pope. Todd Rundgren was unable to appear in the video, and Bonnie Tyler was frustrated that most directors wanted him to feature as a silhouette. Tyler stated that Pope was the only director who suggested using a stand-in actor. Rundgren's lines were subsequently mimed by Welsh actor Hywel Bennett.

After the single was released, Tyler and Pope appeared on an episode of Saturday Superstore, where they hosted a giveaway for the original canvas painting of Tyler and Hywel Bennett, which features in the music video.

== Track listings ==
- 7-inch single
1. "Loving You's a Dirty Job but Somebody's Gotta Do It" (Jim Steinman) — 5:40
2. "Under Suspicion" (Bonnie Tyler, Paul Hopkins, Peter Oxendale) — 4:24
- 12-inch maxi
1. "Loving You's a Dirty Job but Somebody's Gotta Do It" (long version) (Steinman) — 7:48
2. "Under Suspicion" (Tyler, Hopkins, Oxendale) — 4:24
3. "It's a Jungle Out There" (Dennis Polen, Paul Pilger, William Moloney) — 3:57

== Credits and personnel ==
- Roy Bittan – piano, synthesizer
- Jimmy Bralower – drums, percussion
- Steve Buslowe – bass guitar
- Larry Fast – synthesizer
- Eddie Martinez – guitar
- Sid McGinnis – guitar
- Max Weinberg – drums
- Bonnie Tyler – vocal
- Rory Dodd – background vocal
- Todd Rundgren – featured artist, background vocal
- Eric Troyer – background vocal

== Charts ==
Chart (1985–1986)	Peak position
Belgium (Ultratop 50 Flanders)	35
European Hot 100 Singles (Eurotipsheet)	96
Finland (Suomen virallinen lista)	28
France (SNEP)	34
Portugal (AFP)	3
Switzerland (Schweizer Hitparade)	24
UK Singles (Official Charts)	73
US Cash Box Top 100	82
West Germany (GfK)	41

== Meat Loaf version ==
"Loving You Is a Dirty Job (But Somebody's Gotta Do It)"

Song by Meat Loaf

from the album Braver Than We Are
- Released: 9 September 2016
- Length: 6:09
- Label: Caroline International S&D; 429
- Songwriter: Jim Steinman
- Producer: Paul Crook

The song was re-recorded by Meat Loaf on his 2016 album Braver Than We Are, as a duet with Stacy Michelle, under the slightly modified title of "Loving You Is a Dirty Job (But Somebody's Gotta Do It)". This version has the male and female vocals reversed, with the male vocal being the lead. The song was not issued as a single.

== Bibliography ==
- Tyler, Bonnie (2023). Straight from the Heart. Hodder & Stoughton. ISBN 978-1-39972-625-2.
