= Kareen Antonn =

French singer (born 1980)

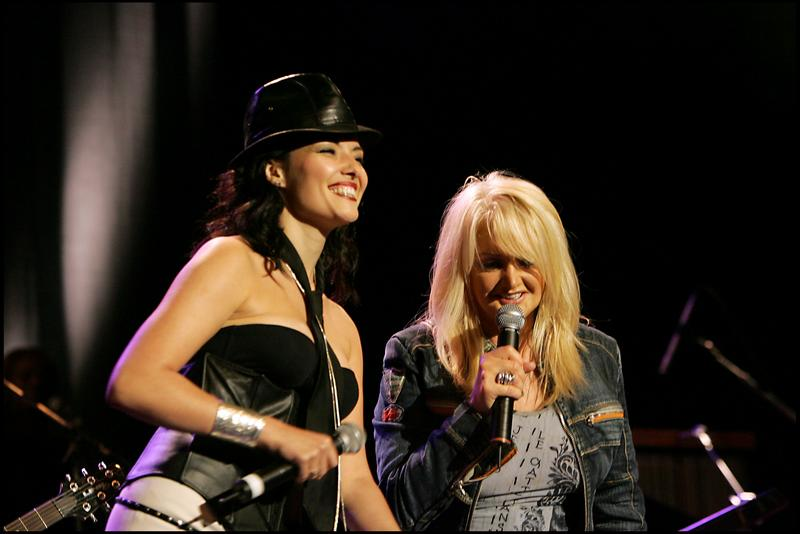
- Antonn performing with Bonnie Tyler

Background information
- Born: Kareen Antonopoulou; 24 May 1980 (age 46); Nogent-sur-Marne, Val-de-Marne, France
- Origin: France
- Genres: Pop
- Occupation: Singer
- Years active: 2003–present
- Label: Sony

Kareen Antonn (born Kareen Antonopoulou on 24 May 1980 in Nogent-sur-Marne, France) is a French singer of Greek and Spanish descent.

In 2003, she recorded a pair of duets with Welsh singer Bonnie Tyler; "Si demain... (Turn Around)" and "Si Tout s'arrête (It's a Heartache)", both French/English covers of "Total Eclipse of the Heart" and "It's a Heartache", respectively. She also recorded "Un Homme se blesse" to help the homeless.

== Discography ==
=== Albums ===
- 2006: Kareen Antonn (Sterne/Sony BMG)

=== Singles ===
- 2003: "Si demain... (Turn Around)" – No. 1 Belgium (Wallonia), No. 1 France, No. 1 Poland (airplay), No. 3 Europe, No. 155 Russia (airplay), No. 7 Switzerland
- 2004: "Si tout s'arrête (It's a Heartache)" – No. 7 Belgium (Wallonia), No. 12 France, No. 10 Poland (airplay), No. 25 Switzerland
- 2004: "John'"
- 2006: "Quand on veut, on peut"
- 2007: "Un Homme se blesse"
