= Holding Out for a Hero =

1984 single by Bonnie Tyler

Single by Bonnie Tyler

from the album Footloose and Secret Dreams and Forbidden Fire
- B-side: "Faster Than the Speed of Night"
- Released: January 1984 (US); April 1984 (UK)
- Recorded: September–December 1983
- Studio: The Power Station (New York City)
- Genre: Hi-NRG; pop; power pop
- Length: 6:21 (extended version); 5:50 (first album version); 4:50 (second album version); 4:22 (single edit)
- Label: CBS; Columbia
- Composer: Jim Steinman
- Lyricist: Dean Pitchford
- Producer: Jim Steinman

Bonnie Tyler singles chronology
"A Rockin' Good Way (to Mess Around and Fall in Love)" (1984)	"Holding Out for a Hero" (1984)	"Here She Comes" (1984)

Music video
- "Holding Out for a Hero" on YouTube

"Holding Out for a Hero" is a song recorded by Welsh singer Bonnie Tyler for the soundtrack to the 1984 film Footloose. It later featured on her sixth studio album, Secret Dreams and Forbidden Fire (1986). The track was produced by Jim Steinman, who co-wrote the song with Dean Pitchford, and was a top 40 hit in several European countries, as well as Canada and on the United States Billboard Hot 100. Its 1985 re-release in the United Kingdom reached number two (remaining there for three weeks) on the UK singles chart and topped the singles chart in Ireland. Following Tyler's death in July 2026, the single peaked at number 13 on the UK Singles Sales Chart.

== Background ==
Paramount Pictures asked Bonnie Tyler to record a song for the soundtrack to the 1984 film Footloose. She agreed on the condition that Jim Steinman, who was her producer at the time through CBS/Columbia, could work with her on the project. Steinman wrote the song with Dean Pitchford, who co-wrote every song on the soundtrack album. Tyler was invited to the Paramount film studios in Los Angeles to watch the film rushes to see how "Holding Out for a Hero" would fit into the plot.

"Holding Out for a Hero" shares numerous musical elements with "Stark Raving Love", a track from Steinman's solo album Bad for Good (1981), including the piano riff and vocal harmonies.

== Critical reception ==
In a retrospective review, The A.V. Club's William Hughes stated that the song "displays some of the worst of its decade's (and composer's) typical excesses: The lyrics are laughable, and the heavy-handed synths and piano riffs come dangerously close to cheese", but adds, "The sum of those parts transcends their limitations, hooking directly into pure emotional need like only the greatest of torch songs can."

Paul Stenning of Metal Hammer described the song as "the ultimate pop anthem", stating "Only Jim Steinman can get away with such bombastic overtones, in this case the perfect coupling with Tyler's inimitable voice." Carl Nevillie in his book, No More Heroes?: Steroids, Cocaine, Finance and Film in the 70s, called it a "typically overblown (and fabulous) piece of Wagnerian Hi-NRG," while Ryan Britt of Fatherly felt it exemplified "pure, gushy ’80s over-the-top power pop."

== Music video ==
The accompanying music video for "Holding Out for a Hero" was produced by Jeffrey Abelson for Parallax Productions, directed by Doug Dowdle, with the concept by Keith Williams. It was filmed at the Grand Canyon, Arizona, and at Veluzat Ranch, California. It was the second video released to promote Footloose while featuring no movie footage in the video.

The video sees Tyler escaping from a burning house; the video is set primarily in the vicinity of the burning house and on the edge of the Grand Canyon – interspersed with shots of angelic background singers in white dresses. Evil cowboys dressed in black, carrying neon whips, appear before Tyler, threatening her; a cowboy hero dressed in white, brandishing a revolver, appears on horseback and the evil cowboys flee on horseback, with the hero in pursuit. As the song fades out, the hero cowboy appears in front of Tyler.

Tyler was later featured in a parody of the video by David Copperfield, in his 1984 TV special The Magic of David Copperfield VI: Floating Over the Grand Canyon.

== Live performances ==
Two recorded performances of "Holding Out for a Hero" have been released on Tyler's concert DVDs Bonnie on Tour (2006) and Live in Germany 1993 (2011), and their respective CD editions.

== Re-recordings and media usage ==
"Holding Out for a Hero" has featured in numerous commercials, film and television soundtracks, and the song has been covered by various artists. In 1984, E. G. Daily's version was used as the theme for the television series Cover Up. In 2004, Jennifer Saunders recorded a version of the song for Shrek 2 which she performs in character as the Fairy Godmother. Frou Frou also recorded a version for the credits sequence. Ella Mae Bowen recorded a cover of the song for the 2011 Footloose remake.

The song has been used for multiple Superman adaptations. In 1993, it was used in a montage sequence for the pilot episode of Lois & Clark: The New Adventures of Superman, while Clark Kent (Dean Cain) tries on different costumes for his new superhero persona. In 2001 it was featured in the movie Bandits. In 2009, Smallville used it as Lois Lane's ring tone for the mysterious superhero then known as "The Blur" (later known as "Superman").

In 2021, the song was noted for its appearances in a trailer for Masters of the Universe: Revelation, a trailer for the Marvel's Guardians of the Galaxy video game, and in the Loki episode "The Variant", all of which premiered in the same week. This led to a significant increase in downloads and streams, and a placement atop Billboard’s Top TV Songs chart. In February 2022, the song again received media coverage for its use in "The Theater and Its Double", an episode of the American TV series Euphoria.

In 2001, Tandi Iman Dupree and Dee St. James performed a dance routine to "Holding Out for a Hero" at the Miss Gay Black America pageant. Footage of the event went viral after it was uploaded to YouTube in 2009.

Tyler has released re-recordings of the song in 2004 and 2011. In 2013, she recorded a new version of the song for use in a Children in Need fundraising campaign.

== Track listings and formats ==
- 1984 7" single
1. "Holding Out for a Hero" – 4:22
2. "Faster Than the Speed of Night" – 4:40
- 1984 12" single
1. "Holding Out for a Hero" (extended remix) – 6:19
2. "Holding Out for a Hero" (instrumental) – 5:15
3. "Faster Than the Speed of Night" – 4:40
- 1991 12"/CD single
1. "Holding Out for a Hero" – 4:41
2. "Faster Than the Speed of Night" – 4:40
3. "Total Eclipse of the Heart" – 6:49

== Credits and personnel ==
- Bonnie Tyler – lead vocals
- Jim Steinman – producer
- John Jansen – associate producer
- Greg Edward, Arthur Payson, Neil Dorfsman – recording, mixing
- Greg Calbi – mastering
- Sterling Smith – piano, synthesizer, Linn drums
- Hiram Bullock – guitar
- John Philip Shenale – programming, synthesizer
- Art Wood – Simmons and Linn drums
- Tom "Bones" Malone – trombone, horn arrangements
- Michael Brecker – tenor saxophone
- Alan Rubin – trumpet
- Lew Soloff – trumpet
- Jim Pugh – trombone
- Dave Taylor – bass trombone
- Rory Dodd, Eric Troyer, Holly Sherwood – background vocalists, vocal arrangement
- Ellen Foley – additional vocal arrangement

== Charts ==
=== Weekly charts ===
Peak chart positions of "Holding Out for a Hero"
Chart (1984)	Peak position
Australia (Kent Music Report)	44
Austria (Ö3 Austria Top 40)	19
Canada (Billboard)	17
Canada Top Singles (RPM)	19
Europarade Top 40 (Music Week)	12
Finland (Suomen virallinen lista)	8
Japan (Oricon Singles Chart)	38
New Zealand (Recorded Music NZ)	33
South Africa (Springbok Radio)	23
Sweden (Sverigetopplistan)	19
UK Singles (Official Charts)	96
US Billboard Hot 100	34
US Cash Box Top 100	35
US ARC Top 40	24
West Germany (GfK)	19

1985 chart positions of "Holding Out for a Hero"
Chart (1985)	Peak position
European Hot 100 Singles (Music & Media)	29
European Airplay Top 50	19
Ireland (IRMA)	1
UK Singles (Official Charts)	2

2017 chart positions of "Holding Out for a Hero"
Chart (2017)	Peak position
Poland Airplay (ZPAV)	49

2021 chart positions of "Holding Out for a Hero"
Chart (2021)	Peak position
Hungary (Single Top 40)	23

2026 chart positions of "Holding Out for a Hero"
Chart (2026)	Peak position
Israel International Airplay (Media Forest)	19
Norway Airplay (IFPI Norge)	81
Switzerland Singles Top 100 (Schweizer Hitparade)	87
UK Singles Sales (Official Charts)	13
UK Video Streaming (Official Charts)	66
US Digital Songs (Billboard)	4

=== Year-end charts ===
Chart (1985)	Position
UK Singles (Official Charts Company)	31

=== Monthly charts ===
Chart (2021)	Peak position
US Top TV Songs (Billboard)	1

== Certifications ==
Region	Certification	Certified units/sales
Denmark (IFPI Danmark)	Gold	45,000^{‡}
Germany (BVMI)	Gold	250,000^{‡}
Italy (FIMI)	Gold	50,000^{‡}
New Zealand (RMNZ)	2× Platinum	60,000^{‡}
Portugal (AFP)	Gold	20,000^{‡}
Spain (Promusicae)	Gold	30,000^{‡}
United Kingdom (BPI)	2× Platinum	1,200,000^{‡}
^{‡} Sales+streaming figures based on certification alone.

== Japanese version ==
Hero: Holding Out for a Hero (Japanese: ヒーロー HOLDING OUT FOR A HERO) is a cover version with Japanese lyrics written by Masao Urino. It was first released as a single by Takeshi Kitagawa in 1984. It was then released as a single by Yuki Katsuragi on 5 July 1984 and reached number 50 on the Oricon Singles Chart. It was then released as a single by Miki Asakura on 5 November 1984. This single reached number 19 on the Oricon Singles Chart and number 20 on the Music Labo singles chart. It sold 181,000 copies according to Oricon and 200,000 copies according to Mamoru Murakami.
