= Bonnie Tyler videography =

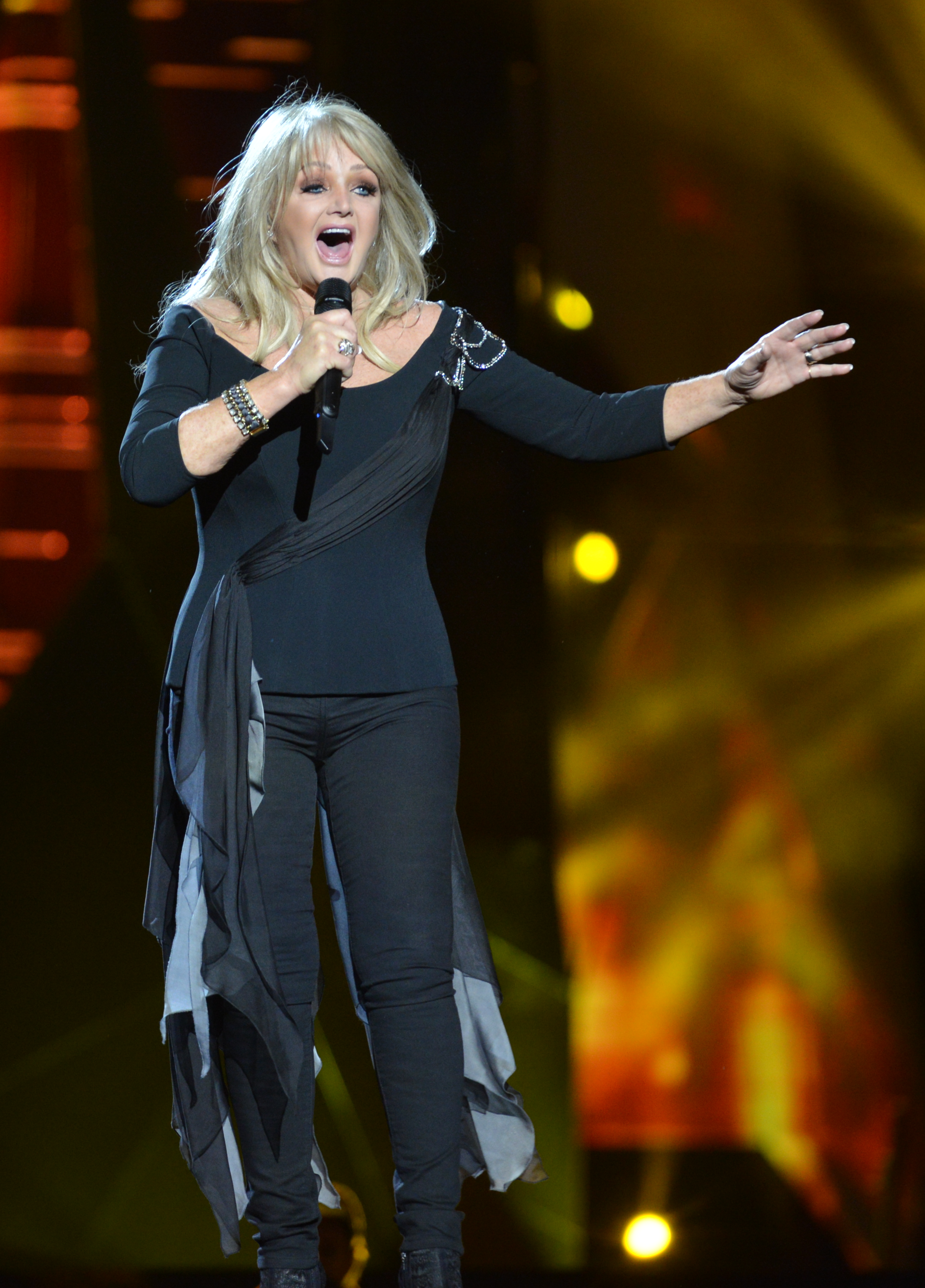
Tyler rehearsing for the 2013 Eurovision Song Contest in Malmö, Sweden

Welsh singer Bonnie Tyler released one video album and has appeared in numerous music videos, television shows, television commercials and in one film. While Tyler was signed to RCA Records between 1976 and 1981, she released three music videos for "Lost in France", "It's a Heartache" and "Sitting On the Edge of the Ocean". She also filmed three videos for the first and second season of The Kenny Everett Video Show.

Tyler's fifth album Faster Than the Speed of Night (1983) spawned the single "Total Eclipse of the Heart", whose music video was filmed at Holloway Sanatorium. Directed by Russel Mulcahy, it depicts Tyler as a high school teacher fantasizing about her students. She also released videos for "Have You Ever Seen the Rain", "Faster Than the Speed of Night" and "Take Me Back". In 1984, Tyler recorded "Holding Out for a Hero" for the Footloose soundtrack, and filmed a video at the Grand Canyon in Arizona, directed by Doug Dowdle. She also filmed a video for "A Rockin' Good Way (to Mess Around and Fall in Love)" with Shakin' Stevens. Her 1985 music video for "Loving You's a Dirty Job (but Somebody's Gotta Do It)" is based on a couple fighting. It was recorded as a duet between Tyler and Todd Rundgren, and features Welsh actor Hywel Bennett miming his lines. In 1986, Tyler filmed a video for her single "If You Were a Woman (And I Was a Man)" which received six nominations at the 1986 Billboard Video Music Conference.

In 1986, Tyler released her first and only video album The Video, featuring eight music videos from her CBS years. "The Best" became her final video with CBS in 1988. Tyler continued to release videos in the 1990s; four with Hansa and one with EastWest. From the 2000s, Tyler released music videos less frequently, including "Si demain... (Turn Around)" with Kareen Antonn, "Louise" in 2005, "Believe in Me" in 2013 and "Love's Holding On" with Axel Rudi Pell in 2017.

Tyler appeared in only one film, singing the title song for The World Is Full of Married Men in 1979 during the opening credits. In 2005, BBC One Wales produced a documentary of Tyler's career titled In One Voice, which focused on her recordings in the 1970s and 1980s, and her album Wings (2005). Tyler made several acting roles on television, including Three of a Kind in 1983, on French comedy sketch show Y a-t-il encore un coco dans le show ? in 1990, and Hollyoaks Later in 2009. She also appeared in two television commercials.

== Music videos ==
Title	Year	Other performer(s) credited	Director(s)	Description	Ref.
"Lost in France"	1976	None		Tyler is seen wandering the grounds of a château, and singing inside a cafe.	
"It's a Heartache"	1978	None		The video features Tyler performing the song with a microphone in hand, under a spotlight. It opens and closes with a visual effect of water running down a glass pane.	
"Sitting on the Edge of the Ocean"	1979	None		Tyler is seen singing on the edge of a lakeside jetty, with occasional close-up shots of the lake.	
"Total Eclipse of the Heart"	1983	None	Russell Mulcahy	Tyler appears as a school teacher wandering the corridors and grounds at night, with scenes of choirboys singing, fencers in combat, and ninjas performing acrobatics.	
"Take Me Back"	1983	None		The video features Tyler as a powerful mistress seated on a throne, flanked by henchmen. Her lover is summoned to her amidst sequences of fighters clashing, with an owl perched nearby.	
"Faster Than the Speed of Night"	1983	None		In the video, Tyler is seen running with her boyfriend to an arcade game at a fair. The video features sequences inspired by the names of arcade games, including 'Guitar Warriors,' with a man dancing with an electric guitar, 'Bikers of the Round Table,' showcasing medieval knights jousting on motorbikes, and 'Space Punks,' with men in sporting outfits dancing. The final game, 'Heathens,' transitions to a pagan ritual-style bonfire dance.	
"Have You Ever Seen the Rain?"	1983	None		In the video, Tyler walks around the grounds of Waverley Abbey House at night with a candle. She opens wooden panes to let in bright light, and is later seen singing indoors, looking out through the glass. The final sequence shows her walking the grounds in daylight.	
"A Rockin' Good Way (to Mess Around and Fall in Love)"	1984	Shakin' Stevens			
"Holding Out for a Hero"	1984	None	Doug Dowdle	The video features Tyler escaping from a burning house, with scenes set near the Grand Canyon. Angelic background singers in white appear alongside a showdown between evil cowboys in black and a heroic cowboy in white. The hero, armed with a revolver, pursues the villains on horseback, and as the song fades, he confronts Tyler.	
"Here She Comes"	1984	None	Brian Johnson	Set near Tower Bridge in London, the video features surreal imagery, including Tyler walking past mannequins resembling royal guards, who come to life and follow her. The video plays with two versions of Tyler, one chasing the other. It ends with a UFO appearing above London and taking off into space.	
"Loving You's a Dirty Job (but Somebody's Gotta Do It)"	1985	Hywel Bennett	Tim Pope	Set in a theatre, the video features Tyler and Welsh actor Hywel Bennett as stars of a play called Secret Dreams and Forbidden Fire. They have a heated argument backstage and on the roof in the pouring rain before reconciling and embracing.	
"If You Were a Woman (And I Was a Man)"	1986	None	Stuart Orme, Jim Steinman	The video opens with a monologue by an older version of Tyler, played by Mary Morris, reflecting on her youth as a singer in a club called The Dive in the fictional city of Obsidian, under siege. The video features strong feminine imagery, including people holding the female symbol, a woman walking a man on a leash, a mud pit fight, and a sequence where a character resembling Rambo transforms into Marilyn Monroe.	
"Sem Limites Pra Sonhar (Reaching for the Infinite Heart)"	1986	Fabio Junior		The video features Tyler and Fábio Jr. singing in a recording studio, interspersed with scenes of Fábio wandering the streets of London.	
"Islands"	1987	Mike Oldfield			
"The Best"	1988	None		In the music video, Tyler performs the song in front of a band and interactions between other people present are filmed.	
"Breakout"	1990	None			
"Fools Lullaby"	1992	None			
"Pethaino Stin Erimia (The Desert is In Your Heart)"	1992	Sofia Arvaniti	George Sofoulis	Tyler's appearance is archived footage from the music video for "If You Were a Woman (And I Was a Man)"	
"Call Me"	1993	None			
"Making Love (Out of Nothing At All)"	1995	None	Randee St. Nicholas		
"Si demain... (Turn Around)"	2003	Kareen Antonn	Vincent Egret	Filmed in Québec. The video opens with Antonn sat holding a puppy outside a coffee shop as Tyler sits beside her. It periodically cuts to show Antonn's past; leaving her lover, meeting Tyler while hitchhiking, and the pair playing with a pack of Siberian Huskies in a field.	
"Louise"	2005	None	Thierry Vergnes, Fabien Valour	Filmed in an old cargo ship wreck called M/V Ydra located in Tunisia.	
"Total Eclipse of the Heart"	2007	BabyPinkStar		Tyler appears at the beginning of the video, on a phone call with the manager of Babypinkstar while waiting at an airport gate. She explains that she will not be able to appear in the music video as her flight has been postponed.	
"Believe in Me"	2013	None	Orlando Cubitt		
"Love's Holding On"	2017	Axel Rudi Pell		The video features Tyler, Johnny Gioeli and Axel Rudi Pell in a recording studio.	
"Yes I Can"	2025	None	Luke Wade	The video features Tyler performing "Yes I Can" in a corridor of hourglasses. As she sings and dances, hourglasses display photographs and video clips from her life, including family moments, early career highlights, and stage performances.	

=== Guest appearances ===
Title	Year	Performer(s)	Description	Ref.
"It's a Live-In World"	1986	The Anti-Heroin Project	Tyler is seen singing part of the pre-chorus in the recording studio, and later between Elkie Brooks and Nik Kershaw . She also appears as part of the chorus toward the end of the video.	
"Sailing"	1990	Rock Against Repatriation	Tyler is seen singing a portion of the first verse in the recording studio, and later singing parts of the chorus	

== Video albums ==
Title	Album details	Description
The Video	Released: 1986; Label: CBS; Format: VHS	Contains a VHS of eight of Tyler's music videos, filmed under CBS Records.
Andrew Lloyd Webber The Royal Albert Hall Celebration	Released: 2000; Label: Universal; Format: DVD	Contains a live performance: "Tyre Tracks and Broken Hearts".
Bonnie on Tour	Released: 10 July 2006; Label: Stick Music; Formats: DVD, CD & digital download	Contains a DVD of Tyler performing concerts at La Cigale in Paris, Zaragoza in Spain, and at the 2005 Sopot Festival. It was issued in the US by San Juan Music on 2 November 2017.
Rock for Asia	Released: 2006; Label: e-m-s; Format: DVD	Contains three live performances: It's a Heartache, To Love Somebody and Sweet Child O' Mine.
The Complete Bonnie Tyler	Released: 2007; Label: Axis; Formats: DVD & CD	Contains the Bonnie on Tour DVD and a bonus CD of Tyler's 2005 album Wings.
Musas Do Pop	Released: 2010; Label: NFK; Format: DVD	A DVD containing seven of Tyler's music videos, and eight music videos by Olivia Newton-John.
Live in Germany 1993	Released: 2 December 2011; Label: ZYX Music; Formats: DVD, CD & digital download	Contains a DVD and CD of Tyler performing at a concert in Germany in 1993. It was re-released as a CD and DVD box in 2013 under the title Live & Lost in France.

== Filmography ==
=== Films ===
Title	Year	Role	Notes	Ref.
The World Is Full of Married Men	1979	Herself	Performing the title song during the title sequence	
36.15 code Père Noël	1989	Herself	Performing the theme song "Merry Christmas"	

=== Television ===
Title	Year	Role(s)	Channel	Notes	Ref.
The Kenny Everett Video Show	1978	Herself	ITV	Series 1, Episode 1 and Episode 6	
The Kenny Everett Video Show	1979	Herself	ITV	Series 2, Episode 4	
Three of a Kind	1983	Herself	BBC One	Series 3, Episode 1	
The Magic of David Copperfield VI: Floating Over the Grand Canyon	1984	Herself	CBS	Television special	
Y a-t-il encore un coco dans le show ?	1990	Herself	TF1	Episode: "Bonnie Tyler"	
Der König von St. Pauli	1998	Herself	Sat.1		
2 Days Later with Jools Holland	1999	Herself		Episode: "Bonnie Tyler"	
On Show	2005	Herself	BBC One Wales	Episode: "Bonnie Tyler In One Voice"	
Zacisze gwiazd	2005	Herself	TVP2	Episode: "Zacisze Bonnie Tyler"	
James Bond's Greatest Hits	2006	Herself	Channel 4	Television special	
Never Mind the Buzzcocks^{[A]}	2007	Herself	BBC Two	Season 20, Episode 6	
Challenge Anneka	2007	Herself	ITV1	Episode: "Over The Rainbow Hospice CD"	
Bonnie Tyler's Top 50 Power Ballads	2008	Herself		Television special	
Hollyoaks Later	2009	Herself	E4	Series 2, Episode 5	
Eurovision Song Contest	2013	Herself	Various	Grand Final	
Meat Loaf: In and Out of Hell	2015	Herself	BBC Four	Television special	
The Nation's Favourite 80s Number One	2015	Herself	ITV1	Television special	
Let's Sing and Dance for Comic Relief	2017	Herself	BBC One	Season 1, Episode 1	
Top of the Pops: The Story of 1985	2018	Herself	BBC Four	Television special	

- AAdditional footage of Tyler was also released on the 2009 DVD The Best of Never Mind the Buzzcocks.

=== Commercials ===
Company	Year	Promoting	Title	Theme song(s)	Region	Ref.
Suntory	1981	Mild vodka	—N/a	"Sayonara Tokyo"	Japan	
Pierre Cardin	1984	Cardin Man's Cologne	—N/a	"You Wear It Well"	United States	
Folgers	1985	Coffee	—N/a	"The Best Part of Wakin' Up"	United States	
MasterCard	2010	World MasterCard	"Thanks"	"Total Eclipse of the Heart"	United Kingdom	
Westpac	2012	—N/a	—N/a	"Total Eclipse of the Heart"	Australia	
Municipio de Albufeira	2021	—N/a	—N/a	"Albufeira Safe"	Portugal	
Jaffa Cakes	2023	—N/a	—N/a	"Total Eclipse of the Heart (Full Moon Remix)"	United Kingdom	

=== Home media ===
Title	Year	Role	Notes	Ref.
Frankie Miller's Double Take	2016	Herself	DVD edition. Interview and footage of Tyler recording "True Love" in David Mackay's studio.	

== See also ==
- List of awards and nominations received by Bonnie Tyler
