= South Africa Tour 2013 =

2013 concert tour by Bonnie Tyler

- Tour by Bonnie Tyler
- Associated album: Rocks and Honey
- Start date: 29 August 2013
- End date: 7 September 2013
- Legs: 1
- No. of shows: 5 in South Africa

Bonnie Tyler concert chronology
- Heart Strings Tour (2003); South Africa Tour 2013 (2013); Greatest Hits Tour (2016)

The South Africa Tour 2013 was a tour by Welsh singer Bonnie Tyler, and marked 20 years since her concert in the country. The tour was widely reported by South African media and followed the release of her album Rocks and Honey (2013) and her appearance on the Eurovision Song Contest 2013. The first two shows in Johannesburg both sold out. It was announced upon her visit that her new album will be released in South Africa "very soon".

Tyler only performed four new songs from Rocks and Honey in her concerts; "This Is Gonna Hurt", "All I Ever Wanted", "Flat On the Floor" and "Mom". "Everybody likes to hear the classics," Tyler explained.

== Background ==
After her concert in Bloemfontein, Tyler and her band visited tourist sites near Cape Town, such as Table Mountain and wine farms around Stellenbosch.

== Tour dates ==
| Date | City | Venue |
|---|---|---|
| 29 August 2013 | Johannesburg | Emperors Palace Hotel Casino Convention Resort |
| 30 August 2013 | Johannesburg | Emperors Palace Hotel Casino Convention Resort |
| 1 September 2013 | Bloemfontein | Callie Human Centre |
| 6 September 2013 | Cape Town | Cape Town International Convention Centre, Auditorium 1 |
| 7 September 2013 | Cape Town | Cape Town International Convention Centre, Auditorium 1 |

== Band ==
- Matt Prior - guitar
- Keith Atack - guitar
- Ed Poole - bass guitar
- John Young - keyboard
- Grahame Rolfe - drums
