= Rocks and Honey =

Studio album by Bonnie Tyler
- Released: 8 March 2013
- Recorded: February–May 2012
- Studio: Cutting Cane Studios (Davie, Florida); Paragon Studios (Franklin, Tennessee); Blackbird Studio, Ben's Studio, Starstruck Studios (Nashville, Tennessee)
- Genre: Country; pop; rock
- Length: 51:14
- Label: ZYX Music; Labrador Music; AXR Music; Celtic Swan Recordings; WMG
- Producer: David Huff; Matt Davis

Bonnie Tyler chronology
| Live in Germany 1993 (2011) | Rocks and Honey (2013) | Between the Earth and the Stars (2019) |

Singles from Rocks and Honey
- 1. "Believe in Me" Released: 13 March 2013; 2. "This Is Gonna Hurt" Released: 16 August 2013; 3. "Love Is the Knife" Released: 16 September 2013

Rocks and Honey is the sixteenth studio album by Welsh singer Bonnie Tyler, first released by ZYX Music on 8 March 2013. Eight years after Wings was released in 2005, this was the longest gap between album releases in Tyler's career, and is the first of her studio albums to chart in the United Kingdom since Hide Your Heart in 1988. With tracks written by Nashville-based songwriters such as Frank J. Myers, Desmond Child, Brett James and Beth Hart, the album consists of a number of country songs reminiscent of Tyler's country albums from the 1970s with elements of rock.

The album received generally positive reviews from music critics, who praised Tyler's vocals as well as the album's consistency. Rocks and Honey charted in Europe, reaching number 28 in Denmark, number 52 in the UK and number 59 in Germany and Switzerland. Tyler embarked on her South Africa Tour 2013 following the Eurovision Song Contest. The single "Believe in Me" represented the United Kingdom in the Eurovision Song Contest 2013 in Malmö, Sweden on 18 May 2013, and has charted in the UK Singles Chart at number 93. The album was named in reference to the contrast between the voices of Tyler and duet partner Vince Gill on the track "What You Need From Me". The follow-up singles, "This Is Gonna Hurt" and "Love Is the Knife", were released in August and September 2013 respectively.

== Background ==
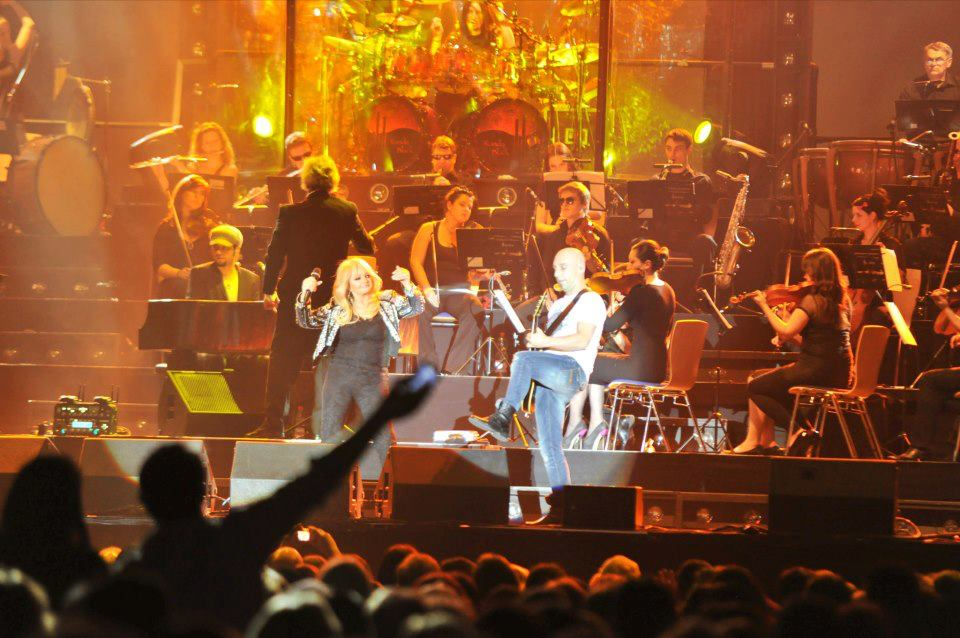
Tyler performing in Ingolstadt, Germany, on March 2, 2013 during the "Rock Meets Classic" 2013 Tour.

Plans for the release of Rocks and Honey date back to as early as 2008, where an interview with Tyler was published in a Turkish newspaper precessing a concert in Northern Cyprus. She announced that she would be working with Jim Steinman for her new album and was aiming for a release in summer 2009. Due to health reasons, Steinman did not end up working on the album. Then in September 2008, Tyler was interviewed on an internet radio show called The Bat Segundo Show, where she stated that she had recorded demos for several tracks and had approached Bryan Adams to do a duet for the album, but he said that it was "not the right time".

During a 2010 interview in New Zealand when preparing to perform at a charity concert, Tyler stated that she had recorded six tracks for the album, expecting a release at some point in 2011. In years leading up to the album's release, Tyler has performed new songs such as "You Are The One", "Don't Tell Me It's Over Now", "It's My Name", and "Is That Thing Loaded?". However, none of these songs were added to the album, despite Tyler announcing during various concerts that they had been recorded, or were due to be recorded for it. "Under One Sky" was also due to be released on the new album, but was instead released on Tyler's 2011 compilation album, Best of 3 CD. During an interview while promoting the album in the UK, she said that it was a possibility that "Is That Thing Loaded?" may be included on a future album.

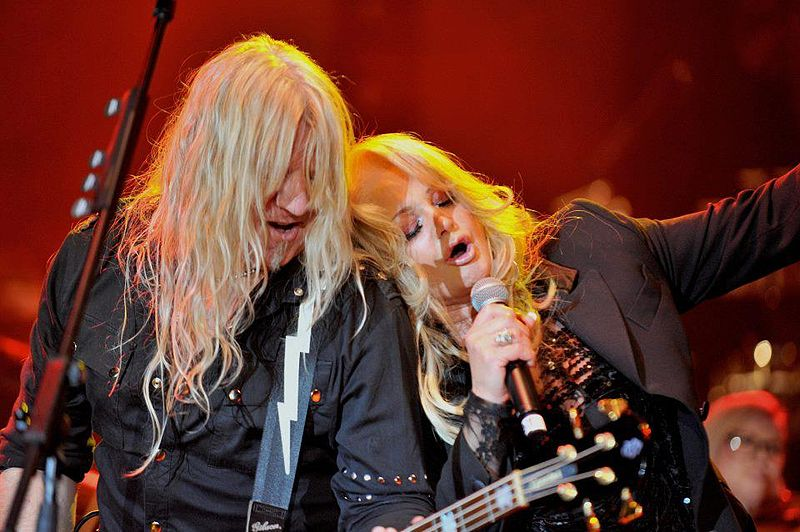
Tyler performing at the S.Oliver Arena, Würzburg, Germany, on March 10, 2013 during the "Rock Meets Classic" 2013 Tour.

On 22 February 2012, Desmond Child announced on his Twitter account that Tyler had been recording some of his songs in Nashville with David Huff as producer. An update about news of the new album was posted on Tyler's old website on 13 February 2012, where it was announced that Tyler had been recording in Nashville. News of a demo recording of "What You Need From Me" was added on 16 April 2012, where it also said that she had visited Los Angeles to help with the mixing of some tracks. Tyler made the title of the album public during an interview in Norway in July later that year.

Between the release of Rocks and Honey and Wings in 2005, Tyler had released a number of compilations including Best Of 3 CD with Stick Music, her previous record company. ZYX Music, the first record company to release Rocks and Honey, first signed Tyler in 2011 and released Live in Germany 1993, a CD and DVD.

=== Album title ===
"What You Need From Me"
A 20-second sample of "What You Need From Me", a country duet between Bonnie Tyler and Vince Gill. The song was the first on the album to be played on radio and was the inspiration for the name of the album.

"What You Need From Me" was written by Jon Randall and Jessi Alexander and a demo was played to Tyler when visiting a publishing company in Nashville in 2011. After hearing the song she approached Vince Gill to record the track as a duet. After recording the song, Tyler stated that someone compared her and Gill's voices to a combination of rocks and honey, which led Tyler to name the album "Rocks and Honey". American singer-songwriters Melissa Bollea and Bill DiLuigi wrote a song with the same title for Tyler, though she had already finalised the naming of the album and turned down the song.

== Development ==
The majority of songs were recorded in various studios in Tennessee between February and May 2012. Tyler has already stated that she has enough remaining material from Nashville-based publishers for a seventeenth studio album.

Two songs were written by Desmond Child. This was the first time Tyler had worked with Child since 1988, on her Hide Your Heart album. All thirteen tracks were newly recorded by Tyler, with the inclusion of two covers; "Flat on the Floor" was originally recorded by Carrie Underwood on her 2007 album Carnival Ride, and "All I Ever Wanted" was first recorded by Beau Davidson in 2010.

While Tyler and her manager were living in Nashville, they visited the Bluebird Cafe on a songwriters' evening where she first discovered some tracks that would be included on Rocks and Honey.

"You have to queue up to get in there, it was like a tiny little house, and all these songwriters sit around a table with their guitars and they all sing their original material. This is where I heard one of the songwriters on the album - I do a song on there called "Mom", it's all about a baby talking to God before it's born. - I heard this singer there, and he was just amazing. There's so much talent there, it's just fabulous. I want to do another album there before the end of my career."

— Bonnie Tyler talking about the Bluebird Cafe. BBC Radio, May 2013.

== Release and promotion ==
Tyler announced Rocks and Honey on 2 August 2012 during an interview with Roy Noble on his BBC Radio Wales show. Her appearance coincided with the worldwide premiere of "What You Need from Me" on radio. Tyler performed "All I Ever Wanted" on Willkommen 2013, a televised New Year's Eve concert broadcast by ZDF. She performed the track again on Willkommen bei Carmen Nebel in February 2013.

Between February and March 2013, Tyler performed as a guest artist during the Rock Meets Classic tour in Germany. Her debut performance of "Believe in Me", backed by a rock band and a full orchestra, took place at the Max-Schmeling-Halle in Berlin on 18 February.

Tyler stated that Rocks and Honey was originally planned for release in October 2012. However, after the BBC approached her about entering the Eurovision Song Contest with the track "Believe in Me", its release was moved to March 2013. The album received a staggered release, through multiple record labels, in a span of three months from March to May 2013.

=== Singles ===
"Believe in Me"
A 20-second sample of "Believe in Me", the first single from the album and the United Kingdom's entry for the Eurovision Song Contest 2013. The song has been praised by various critics of the album.

"Believe in Me" was announced as the UK's Eurovision entry on 7 March 2013. It became available for download in the UK on 13 March, and a European maxi CD followed on 15 March. On 28 March, Radio 2 listed "Believe in Me" as their Record of the Week. Music Week reported that "Believe in Me" was the most-played track on Radio 2 in the week before Eurovision, and the second most played track in the second quarter of the year.

Tyler indicated that "Sunshine" and "All I Ever Wanted" were likely to follow as the next two singles. However, in July 2013, "This Is Gonna Hurt" was sent to radio stations. It was quickly added to BBC Radio 2's A-list playlist, indicating frequent airplay. A physical release followed in Germany on 16 August. "Love Is the Knife" was released as the third and final single on 16 September 2013, exclusively in Scandinavia. To promote its release, Tyler performed the track on Charlies Hjertegalla ("Charlie's Heart Gala"), a charity programme broadcast by the Danish network TV 2.

In 2014, American singer Garth Brooks released a cover of "Mom" as a single from his studio album Man Against Machine.

=== Touring ===
Tyler has expressed her wishes to tour with the new album in the UK and France. While promoting the album in France, she met with a tour company on 1 June 2013 to discuss a tour of France. In August 2013, Tyler began her South Africa Tour 2013, in which she performed at five concerts in three different South African cities.

=== Bonnie Tyler in the Eurovision Song Contest 2013 ===
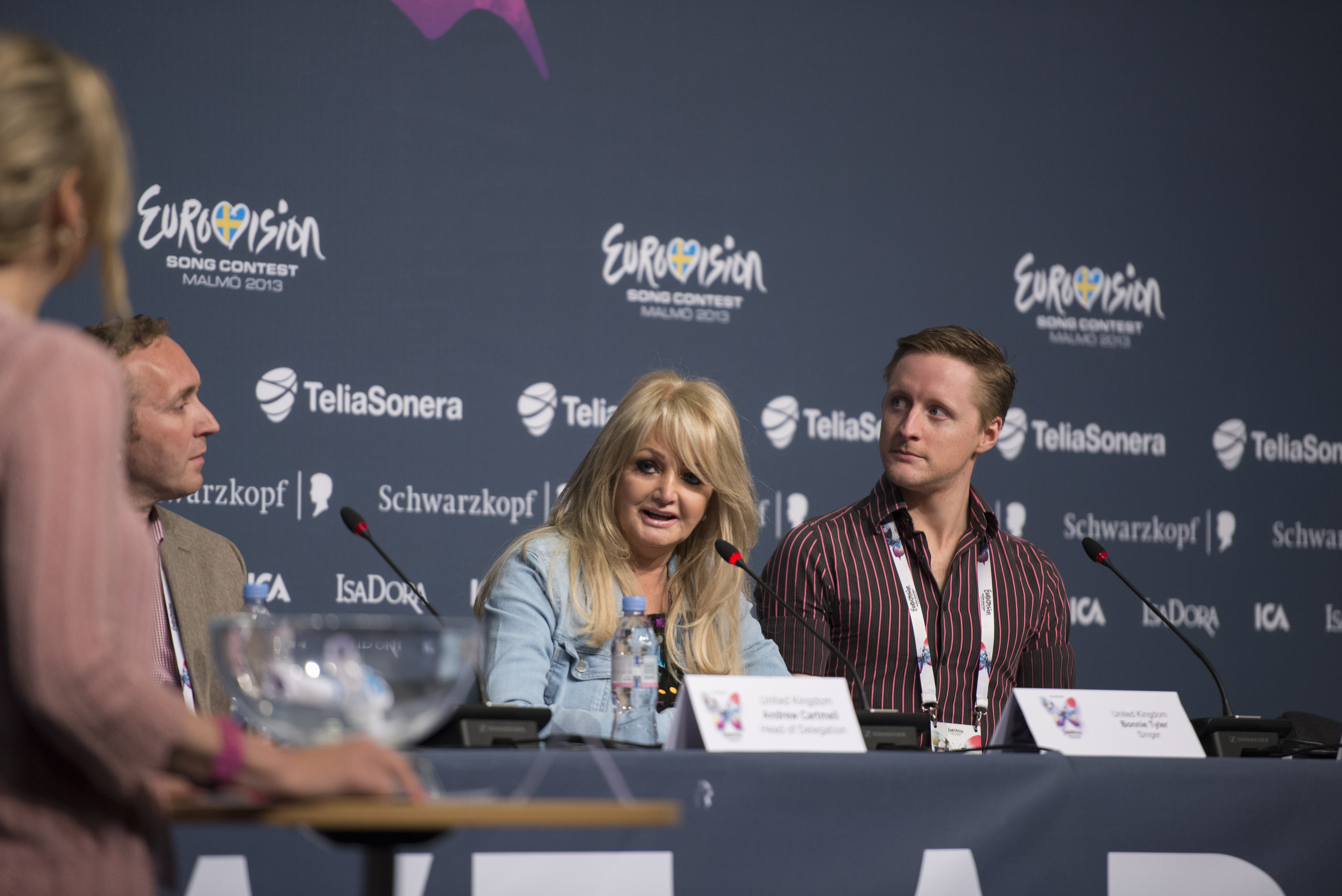
Tyler at the Eurovision Song Contest press conference in Malmö, Sweden, 15 May 2013.

At mid-day, Tyler was interviewed and then performed an acoustic version of the song on BBC Radio 2's Weekend Wogan with her Eurovision group.

For further promotion, Tyler was a guest on The One Show on 19 March 2013 and was interviewed on several British radio stations leading up to the Grand Final. On 19 May, a day after the Eurovision Song Contest, the Official Charts Company announced that Tyler's song charted highest of all Eurovision entries in the UK.

After the contest finished, the BBC published the reaction of several journalists and singers towards Tyler finishing 19th. Irish entrant and three-time winner of Eurovision Johnny Logan complimented Tyler, but argued that the song wasn't strong enough. He continued, "If you're going to win Eurovision, to go through some of the incredible voting I've noticed over the last few years, you have to have something that's going to stand out above everything else. Otherwise you're just going to hope to pick up 10 or 11 votes." Similarly, Nathan Moore agreed that the song was not strong enough, but said "It was a great idea to get Bonnie involved, there's a lot of love for Bonnie out there." Mick Dalley (of Yahoo! News) agreed that "although Tyler herself was on form, singing beautifully and rousing the crowd with her podiumed finale, "Believe in Me" was simply not good enough as a song". 1997 UK winner Katrina Leskanich (of Katrina and the Waves) stated that she was underwhelmed by Denmark's entry, and expected Tyler to have scored higher than she did. British journalist Dave Goodman acknowledged that Tyler's entry was an improvement on the previous year, though argued that it was a combination of a poor position in the running order and the song that kept the UK from scoring higher.

== Critical reception ==
Professional ratings
Review scores
| Source | Rating |
|---|---|
| Daily Express | 3/5 stars |
| Entertainment Focus | 4/5 stars |
| MigMag | (7/10) |
| Music-News | 4/5 stars |
| Music OMH | 2.5/5 stars |
| So So Gay | 5/5 stars |
| The Yorkshire Times | 5/5 stars |
| Virgin Media | 3/5 stars |

Rocks and Honey has received mixed reviews from critics since its release. Dirk Neuhaus of Country Rock Magazine published a favourable review of the album, crediting David Huff and Matt Davis for the album production and called "What You Need From Me" a "fantastic track." Norbert Schiegel of G+J Entertainment Media highlighted the tracks "Sunshine" as a "pleasantly catchy" song, and "What You Need From Me" as "sensational." He described the whole album as "outstanding." Jeremy Williams of The Yorkshire Times gave the album a 5/5 rating. He asks, "has the gritty vocal of Bonnie Tyler still got what it takes to make you tingle? The simple answer is YES," and marks the album as an "impressive return to her country roots". He also questions that the track "Little Superstar" was not chosen for the UK's Eurovision song over "Believe in Me". Similarly, Music-News' Andy Snipper suggested that the track "Mom" would have been better suited as the Eurovision song, though describes Rocks and Honey as "a fine album."

The album received a mixed review from Adam Carroll from Seen It Heard It. He says that "This Is Gonna Hurt" provides a solid start to the album, with "Sunshine" being his favourite song, and though not keen on ballads, describes "Believe in Me" as a fantastic song. However, he considers "What You Need From Me" to be one of the weakest tracks on the album, describing Tyler's voice as "rough and beaten" and that her and Vince Gill's voices do not go together well. Despite this, he still describes the album as solid, and ends with "Bonnie Tyler proves that she is still one of the greatest vocalists out there." Virgin Media's Ian Gittins gave the album 3 stars. He stated that the album has nothing new to offer, and could have been recorded any time between 1978 and the present day. The most critical of the album has been Thomas Ingham from OMH Media, who gave the album 2 and a half stars, described the album's format as "simple – loud, quiet, loud, quiet" and is compiled of a mixture of "cheesy ballads" and "country pop-rock" songs, describing "Flat On The Floor" as "clichéd, but worryingly catchy." He ended with predicting that Tyler will not be able to take the UK out of its poor Eurovision results trend.

== Track listing ==
| No. | Title | Writer(s) | Length |
|---|---|---|---|
| 1. | "This Is Gonna Hurt" | Kurt Allison; Kelly Archer; David Fanning | 3:07 |
| 2. | "Sunshine" | Stefanie Ridel; Michael Smith; Jennifer Alden | 2:52 |
| 3. | "Believe in Me" | Desmond Child; Lauren Christy; Christopher Braide | 3:57 |
| 4. | "What You Need From Me" (with Vince Gill) | Jon Randall; Jessi Alexander | 4:03 |
| 5. | "Crying" | James House; Kyle Jacobs; Drew Copeland | 3:24 |
| 6. | "Little Superstar" | House; Beth Hart | 3:08 |
| 7. | "Flat on the Floor" | Ashley Monroe; Brett James | 3:20 |
| 8. | "All I Ever Wanted" | Frank J. Myers; Gary Baker; Zoran Konevic | 3:46 |
| 9. | "Stubborn" | Child; Keeley Hawkes; Peter Mansson | 3:46 |
| 10. | "Love Is the Knife" | J.D. Leonard; Jim Sells | 4:40 |
| 11. | "Lord Help Me" | Ashley Monroe; Katrina Elam; Carrie Underwood | 3:33 |
| 12. | "Mom" | Wynn Varble; Don Sampson | 3:54 |
| 13. | "You Try" | Mary Danna; Greg Friia; Andrew Lane; Anthony Little | 4:19 |
| 14. | "Believe in Me" (Eurovision/radio edit) | Child; Christy; Braide | 3:01 |
| Total length: | | | 51:14 |

UK iTunes bonus track
| No. | Title | Writer(s) | Length |
|---|---|---|---|
| 15. | "Total Eclipse of the Heart" (2013 version) | Jim Steinman | 5:53 |
| Total length: | | | 57:07 |

== Chart performance ==
| Chart (2013) | Peak position |
|---|---|
| Danish Albums (Hitlisten) | 28 |
| France Downloads (SNEP) | 116 |
| German Albums (Offizielle Top 100) | 59 |
| Scottish Albums (OCC) | 56 |
| Swiss Albums (Schweizer Hitparade) | 59 |
| UK Albums (OCC) | 52 |
| UK Independent Albums (OCC) | 13 |

== Personnel ==
Credits adapted from Allmusic:

Musicians

- Lead vocals – Bonnie Tyler
- Guest vocals – Vince Gill (track 4)
- Drums – Chad Cromwell
- Bass – Jimmie Lee Sloas
- Acoustic guitar / mandolin / dobro / banjo – Ilya Toshinsky
- Electric guitars – Jerry McPherson, Tom Bukovac, Kenny Greenberg
- Piano / B-3 / synthesizer – Mike Rojas
- Strings – Larry Hall (track 2)
- Backing vocals
  - Bekka Bramlett (track 1, 7, 10 and 11)
  - Jodi Marr (track 1, 2, 3, 9 and 14)
  - James House (track 5 and 6)
  - Russell Terrell (track 8 and 12)
  - Bob Bailey (track 13)
  - Vicki Hampton (track 13)
  - Wendy Moten (track 13)
  - Derek Lee (track 13).
- Choir – Tennessee Gospel Choir (track 13)

Production

- Producer – David Huff
- Executive producer & management – Matt Davis
- Tracking engineer – Drew Bollman
- Assistant engineers – Sorrel Brigman, Seth Morton
- Additional second engineers – Chris Small, Chris Ashburn and Miles Suqua
- Mastering – Adam Ayan

Photography

- Cover photo – Sergei Arzumanyan
- Page 2 and 6 – Katie Scott
- Page 5 to 8 – Andrew Hopkins

Recording studios

- Blackbird Studio, Nashville (Tennessee)
- Ben's Studio, Nashville (Tennessee)
- Star Struck Studio, Nashville (Tennessee)
- Paragon Studio, Nashville (Tennessee)
- Cane Cutting Studio, Miami (Florida)

Mixing

- Eargasm Studio, Santa Monica (California)
- Larabee Studio, North Hollywood (California)
- Star Struck Studio, Nashville (Tennessee)

Mastering

- Adam Ayan, Gateway Mastering, Portland (Maine)

== Release history ==
| Country | Date | Label | Format |
|---|---|---|---|
| Austria, Germany, Switzerland | 8 March 2013 | ZYX Music | CD, digital download |
| Sweden | 19 April 2013 | Labrador Music | CD, digital download |
| Finland | 3 May 2013 | AXR Music | CD |
| United Kingdom, Ireland | 6 May 2013 | Celtic Swan Recordings | CD, digital download |
| Worldwide | 29 February 2020 | Bandpick Limited | Digital download |
