= Together (David Guetta and Hypaton song) =

2025 single by David Guetta and Hypaton song

Single by David Guetta, Hypaton and Bonnie Tyler
- Released: 4 July 2025
- Length: 2:33
- Label: What a DJ; Warner Music
- Songwriters: Hypaton, David Guetta, Timofey Reznikov, Jim Steinman
- Producers: Hypaton, David Guetta, Timofey Reznikov

David Guetta singles chronology
"Lighter" (2025)	"Together" (2025)	"Our Time" (2025)

Bonnie Tyler singles chronology
"Yes I Can" (2025)	"Together" (2025)	"Only Love" (2026)

"Together" is song by David Guetta, Hypaton and Bonnie Tyler, released in July 2025. The song interpolates the chorus of Tyler's 1983 single "Total Eclipse of the Heart", rerecorded for this song. Prior to its release, the song gained traction as a fan favourite, fueled by teaser clips shared by Guetta.

== Track Listing ==
1. "Together" - 2:33
2. "Together" (extended version) - 3:45

== Charts ==
=== Weekly charts ===
Weekly chart performance for "Together"
Chart (2025)	Peak position
Argentina Anglo Airplay (Monitor Latino)	5
Belarus Airplay (TopHit)	146
Belgium (Ultratop 50 Wallonia)	25
Bolivia Anglo Airplay (Monitor Latino)	10
Central America Anglo Airplay (Monitor Latino)	12
Dominican Republic Anglo Airplay (Monitor Latino)	6
Ecuador Anglo Airplay (Monitor Latino)	7
Estonia Airplay (TopHit)	49
France (SNEP)	60
Germany Dance (Offizielle Dance Top 20)	20
Honduras Anglo Airplay (Monitor Latino)	1
Israel International Airplay (Media Forest)	6
Latin America Anglo Airplay (Monitor Latino)	18
Latvia Airplay (TopHit)	5
Lebanon English (Lebanese Top 20)	20
Lithuania Airplay (TopHit)	53
Netherlands (Single Tip)	26
Panama Anglo Airplay (Monitor Latino)	7
Paraguay Airplay (Monitor Latino)	12
Romania Airplay (TopHit)	53
Slovenia Airplay (Radiomonitor)	20
Sweden Heatseeker (Sverigetopplistan)	17
UK Singles Downloads (Official Charts)	74
UK Singles Sales (OCC)	78
Uruguay Anglo Airplay (Monitor Latino)	3
Venezuela Anglo Airplay (Monitor Latino)	6

=== Monthly charts ===
Monthly chart performance for "Together"
Chart (2025)	Peak position
Estonia Airplay (TopHit)	61
Latvia Airplay (TopHit)	12
Romania Airplay (TopHit)	56

== Certifications ==
Certifications for "Together"
Region	Certification	Certified units/sales
France (SNEP)	Platinum	200,000^{‡}
^{‡} Sales+streaming figures based on certification alone.
