= What You Need from Me =

Song by Bonnie Tyler and Vince Gill

from the album Rocks and Honey
- Genre: Country, country pop
- Length: 4:06
- Label: ZYX Music
- Songwriter(s): Jon Randall, Jessi Alexander
- Producer(s): David Huff

"What You Need from Me" is a duet recorded by Welsh singer Bonnie Tyler and American singer-songwriter Vince Gill, taken from Tyler's sixteenth studio album and the 4th track of the album, Rocks and Honey (2013).

== Background and release ==
The song was composed by American country singer-songwriters Jon Randall and Jessi Alexander and presented to Bonnie Tyler and her manager when they visited Nashville in 2011 searching for new material from music publishers. After hearing a demo of the song, Tyler said that she would prefer to sing the song as a duet, and approached Vince Gill to see if he would be interested. "He said yes," Tyler explained during an interview about the album, "so we [recorded the song in] his studio in his house in Nashville."

The song was first played on BBC Radio Wales on August 2, 2012 when Tyler was interviewed by Roy Noble on his radio show. "What You Need From Me" was also the first track from Rocks and Honey to be played on radio. After recording the song, Tyler played it to a friend who compared her and Gill's voices to a combination of rocks and honey, which inspired the name of the album.

"What You Need from Me" was later released as the second track on the CD single of "This Is Gonna Hurt" on August 16, 2013.

== Critical reception ==
"What You Need From Me" received mixed reviews from music critics. Norbert Schiegel of G+J Entertainment Media described the song as "sensational," and Dirk Neuhaus of Country Rock Magazine called it a "fantastic track," while Adam Carroll from Seen It Heard It thought that the song was one of the weakest tracks from Rocks and Honey, describing Tyler's voice as "rough and beaten" and that her and Vince Gill's voices do not go well together.
