= Bonnie Tyler =

Welsh singer (1951–2026)

Bonnie Tyler MBE
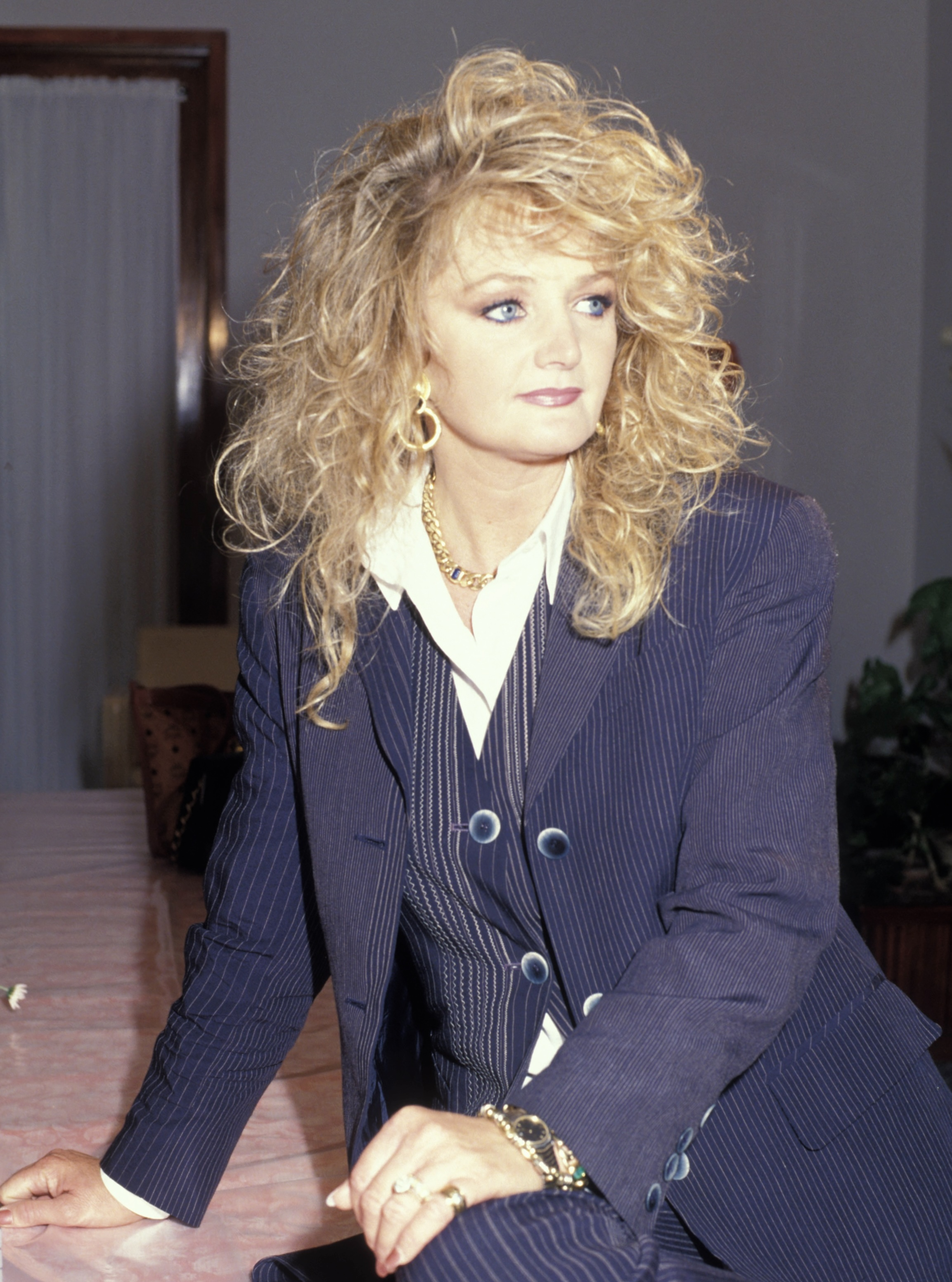
- Tyler in 1997
- Born: Gaynor Hopkins; 8 June 1951; Skewen, Glamorgan, Wales
- Died: 8 July 2026 (aged 75); Faro, Algarve, Portugal
- Other name: Britain's First Lady of Rock
- Occupations: Singer; songwriter; philanthropist
- Years active: 1969–2026
- Works: Discography; videography
- Spouse: Robert Sullivan (m. 1973)
- Awards: Full list
- Musical career
- Genres: Rock; country; pop; pop rock; soft rock
- Instruments: Vocals
- Labels: RCA; Columbia; Hansa; EastWest; CMC; Yanis; Stick Music; earMUSIC
- Website: bonnietyler.com

Signature
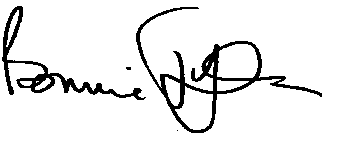

Gaynor Sullivan (née Hopkins; 8 June 1951 – 8 July 2026), known professionally as Bonnie Tyler, was a Welsh singer. Known for her distinctive husky voice, she came to prominence with the release of her debut studio album The World Starts Tonight (1977) and its singles "Lost in France" and "More Than a Lover". Her 1977 single "It's a Heartache" reached number four on the UK singles chart and number three on the US Billboard Hot 100.

In the 1980s, Tyler ventured into rock music with songwriter and producer Jim Steinman. He wrote Tyler's biggest hit, "Total Eclipse of the Heart", which sold over 13 million copies worldwide and was released as the lead single from her UK chart-topping album Faster Than the Speed of Night (1983). Steinman also wrote Tyler's other major 1980s hit, "Holding Out for a Hero". Her other successful singles during this period included "Here She Comes" from the 1984 soundtrack to Metropolis and "If You Were a Woman (And I Was a Man)", written by Desmond Child and produced by Steinman. She had success in mainland Europe during the 1990s with Dieter Bohlen, who wrote and produced her hit "Bitterblue". In 2003, Tyler re-recorded "Total Eclipse of the Heart" with singer Kareen Antonn; their bilingual duet, titled "Si demain... (Turn Around)", topping the French charts.

Tyler released Rocks and Honey in 2013, featuring the single "Believe in Me", which she performed while representing the United Kingdom at the Eurovision Song Contest 2013 in Malmö, Sweden. After reuniting with the producer David Mackay, she released Between the Earth and the Stars (2019) and The Best Is Yet to Come (2021).

Tyler's work earned her three Grammy Award nominations and three Brit Award nominations (including twice for British Female Solo Artist), among other accolades. In 2022, she was awarded an MBE in the Queen's Birthday Honours for her services to music. Her singles "Total Eclipse of the Heart" and "It's a Heartache" have estimated sales of over 6 million units each, and are among the best-selling singles of all time.

== Early life ==
Gaynor Hopkins was born on 8 June 1951, in Skewen, Neath, Wales. Her father, Glyndwr Hopkins, was a coal miner and World War II serviceman, and her mother, Elsie Hopkins (née Lewis), was a housewife. She grew up in a four-bedroom council house with three sisters and two brothers (one of her sisters sang backing vocals on a song Tyler wrote with her manager and other writers). She was exposed to a variety of singers and genres through her siblings including Elvis Presley, Frank Sinatra, and the Beatles. Frankie Miller was the first live act that Tyler saw, and she later recorded duets with him. Hopkins attended Rhydhir Comprehensive School in Neath, leaving at 16 with no qualifications, and began working in a grocery shop. She and her family were deeply religious Protestant Christians. Her first public performance was in a chapel as a child, singing the Anglican hymn "All Things Bright and Beautiful".

In April 1969, Hopkins was entered into a local talent competition by her aunt and came second to an accordionist. Inspired to pursue a singing career, she worked as a backing singer for Bobby Wayne & the Dixies before forming her own band, Imagination. Around that time, she changed her name to Sherene Davis to avoid confusion with Welsh folk singer Mary Hopkin.

== Career ==
=== 1975–1978: The World Starts Tonight and Natural Force ===
In 1975, Davis was spotted singing with her band in the Townsman Club in Swansea, Wales, by talent scout Roger Bell, who invited her to London to record a demo track. After several months, she received a phone call from RCA Records offering her a recording contract. They recommended that she change her name again. After compiling a list of surnames and first names from a newspaper, Davis chose the name "Bonnie Tyler".

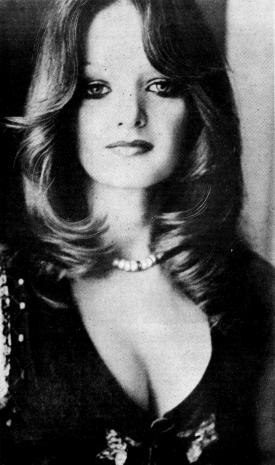
Tyler in 1977

Ronnie Scott and Steve Wolfe became her managers, songwriters, and producers. "My! My! Honeycomb" was released as her debut single in April 1976 but did not chart. In September 1976, as part of a promotional campaign for Tyler's next single, "Lost in France", RCA allocated £4,000 for a strategic initiative that involved sending 30 music journalists and radio DJs to Le Touquet, France where they met Tyler over a four-course meal. "Lost in France" peaked at No. 9 in the UK and led to Tyler's first appearance on Top of the Pops. "More Than a Lover" followed in January 1977. Due to the perceived sexual nature of its lyrics, it was banned from the new British children's TV series, Get It Together. Though surprised, Tyler said she was grateful for the "extra publicity". It peaked at No. 27 in the UK.

Tyler's debut album, The World Starts Tonight, was released in February 1977. To promote it, she embarked on her first UK tour as a guest artist with Gene Pitney. The album failed to chart in the UK, but reached No. 2 in Sweden. In spring 1977, Tyler underwent surgery to remove vocal-cord nodules and was advised by her doctor to rest her voice for six weeks. She screamed in frustration one day, resulting in a permanent raspy tone.

In July 1977, Tyler released her fourth single, "Heaven", which peaked at no. 24 in Germany. She attributed its underwhelming performance elsewhere to the death of Elvis Presley in August 1977, after which RCA redirected its focus to reissuing Presley's back catalogue. "It's a Heartache" followed in November 1977 and became one of Tyler's most successful singles, peaking at No. 4 in the UK and No. 3 on the Billboard Hot 100. "Here Am I" was released in April 1978 and peaked at No. 4 in Norway. David Mackay parted ways with Ronnie Scott and Steve Wolfe in 1978, and Gordon Mills briefly took over as her manager. Mills organised her first tour of the United States in July 1978, including several nights at the Greek Theatre in Los Angeles supporting Tom Jones. Tyler's second studio album, Natural Force, was released in May 1978. It was certified Gold by the Recording Industry Association of America (RIAA), with sales of over half a million copies.

=== 1979–1981: Diamond Cut and Goodbye to the Island ===
Scott and Wolfe produced Tyler's third album, Diamond Cut, with Robin Geoffrey Cable. Released in February 1979, it was a Top 20 record in Finland, Norway, and Sweden, but only reached No. 145 in the US. Tyler felt that RCA was pushing her to record more country-oriented music, which frustrated her. The album yielded one major hit, "My Guns Are Loaded", which peaked at No. 10 on the Canadian AC chart.

In the summer of 1979, Tyler had another UK Top 40 hit with "(The World Is Full of) Married Men". She recorded it for a film adaptation of Jackie Collins' novel of the same name, and she performed the song during the film's closing titles. In November 1979, Tyler represented the UK at the Yamaha World Popular Song Festival in Japan. She won the Grand Prix International award for her performance of "Sitting on the Edge of the Ocean", written by Scott and Wolfe. They co-produced her fourth album, Goodbye to the Island, with Hugh Murphy. Released in 1981, it only charted in Norway. RCA invited her to extend her contract for another five years, but she declined, expressing disillusionment with her artistic image and noting a scarcity of performance opportunities in the aftermath of several unsuccessful singles.

=== 1982–1989: The CBS years ===
After her contract with RCA expired, Tyler signed with CBS/Columbia. A&R executive Muff Winwood asked her to scout a new producer. She considered Phil Collins, Jeff Lynne and Alan Tarney, but Jim Steinman was her first choice. "I'm a huge fan of his records, especially his solo album, and when my manager and I were discussing my comeback, we both agreed that I had to sound the best or nobody would take me seriously." Steinman initially declined, but reconsidered after Tyler sent him demos of the rock material she hoped to record.

After their initial meeting, Tyler returned to Steinman's New York apartment a few weeks later, where she performed "Total Eclipse of the Heart" with Rory Dodd, a rock singer from Ontario, Canada. Steinman said that the song is "a Wagnerian-like onslaught of sound and emotion", and a "showpiece" for Tyler's voice. Her fifth album was partially recorded at the Power Station in New York, with members of the E Street Band, Rick Derringer on guitar, Dodd and Eric Troyer on backing vocals, and Steinman as producer.

"Total Eclipse of the Heart" was released in the UK on 11 February 1983. It became one of the best-selling singles of all time with over 13 million copies sold worldwide. Her fifth studio album, Faster Than the Speed of Night, debuted at No. 1 on the UK Albums Chart and reached No. 3 on the US Cashbox chart and No. 4 on the Billboard 200, selling over one million copies in the United States. Tyler's commercial success led to several award nominations, including two Grammys, two AMAs and a BRIT Award. She was named Best Recording Artist at the Variety Club of Great Britain Awards, and she received a Goldene Europa.

Tyler also found success with several soundtrack recordings in the mid-80s. In 1984, she released "Holding Out for a Hero" from the Footloose soundtrack. In 1985, her recording of "Here She Comes" for Giorgio Moroder's restoration of the 1927 film Metropolis earned her a Grammy nomination for Best Female Rock Vocal Performance. Tyler also declined an offer to record the theme for the James Bond spin-off Never Say Never Again.

In 1986, Tyler released her sixth studio album, Secret Dreams and Forbidden Fire. In another collaboration with Steinman, the album also featured songs written by Desmond Child and Bryan Adams, as well as a cover of Freda Payne's "Band of Gold". "If You Were a Woman (And I Was a Man)" became the album's most successful single, selling over 250,000 units in France. The music video, directed by Steinman and Stuart Orme, received six nominations at the Billboard Video Music Conference. She also collaborated with Brazilian singer Fábio Júnior on the bilingual album Sem Límites pra Sonhar, including the lead single Sem Limites pra Sonhar (Reaching for the Infinite Heart).

In 1987, Tyler collaborated with Mike Oldfield on the title track to his album Islands. In 1988, she played Polly Garter on George Martin's album Under Milk Wood, a radio drama by Dylan Thomas. The music was composed by Elton John and featured vocal contributions from Tom Jones, Anthony Hopkins and Mary Hopkin.

Tyler asked Desmond Child to produce her seventh album, Hide Your Heart, which was released on 9 May 1988. The album featured collaborations with Michael Bolton, Albert Hammond, and Diane Warren. Its singles, "Hide Your Heart", "Save Up All Your Tears" and "The Best" became major hits for other artists. Tina Turner had a global hit with "The Best" and Tyler conceded “I have to be honest, she did it much better than I did.”

=== 1990–2000: Success in continental Europe ===
In 1990, Tyler signed to Hansa/BMG Ariola and began working with various producers for her eighth studio album. She collaborated with Dieter Bohlen, Giorgio Moroder, Nik Kershaw and Roy Bittan. "We used so many producers in efforts to capture many different moods for many different territories, because we believed in the international crossover potential of Tyler," said David Brunner, A&R manager for Hansa.

Bitterblue was released on 11 November 1991. In a retrospective review, AllMusic's Tomas Mureika noted that the album marked a "much more mainstream and less bombastic" direction in Tyler's career. The title track was issued a month before the album and became a top-40 hit in several European countries. It was named 'Catchy Song of the Year' at the RSH-Gold Awards. In 1992, "Bitterblue" was released as a promotional single in the US, where it was met with criticism. Billboard wrote that "bombastic production, with a rush of bagpipes and a choir of chirping children at the forefront, overpower Tyler's distinctive raspy voice." Although Bitterblue was never released in the UK or US, the album was a commercial success in mainland Europe. It topped the charts in Austria and Norway, achieving 4× Platinum status in the latter country with 11 weeks at No. 1.

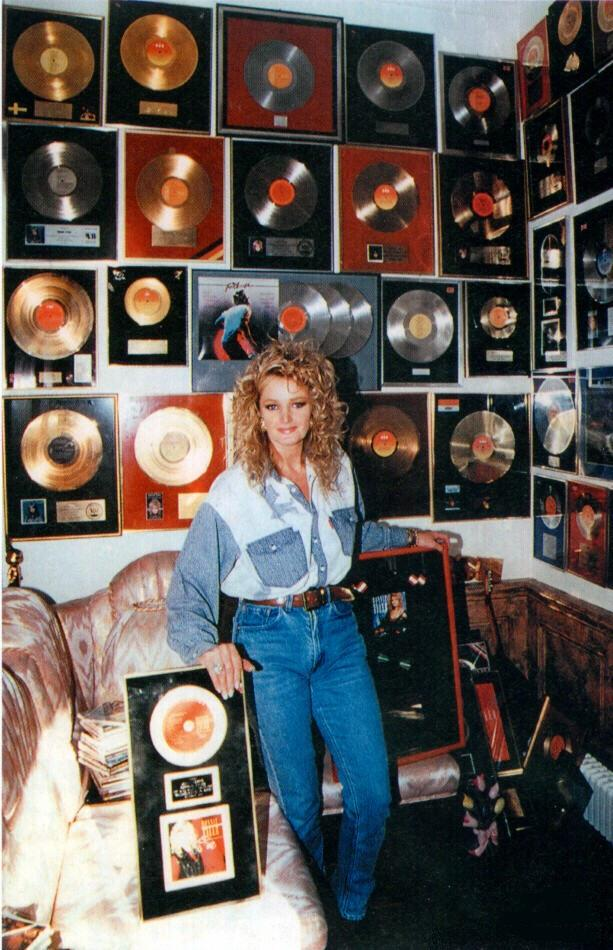
Tyler in 1993 at her home in Wales, United Kingdom, with her gold and platinum records

Tyler's subsequent albums, Angel Heart (1992) and Silhouette in Red (1993), were also successful in mainland Europe. Both albums featured a greater share of songs written and produced by Dieter Bohlen. Tyler was named Best International Singer at the Goldene Europa Awards in 1993, and Best Pop/Rock Singer at the ECHO Awards in 1994. In 1995, Tyler moved to EastWest Records and released Free Spirit. The album featured collaborations with several producers, including Humberto Gatica, David Foster and Steinman. The lead single, a cover of Air Supply's "Making Love (Out of Nothing At All)", reached No. 45 on the UK Singles Chart in January 1996. The album was re-released in March 1996 featuring a cover of "Limelight" by the Alan Parsons Project; the track was used as a theme for the German team at the 1996 Summer Olympics in Atlanta.

Tyler's 12th studio album, All in One Voice, was released in 1998. Much of the album was recorded with Jimmy Smyth in Dublin and Harold Faltermeyer in Hamburg, Germany. She appeared on Rick Wakeman's progressive rock album Return to the Centre of the Earth (1999) performing on the song "Is Anybody There?". The album also included narration from Star Trek actor Patrick Stewart and vocals from Ozzy Osbourne, Katrina Leskanich and Justin Hayward.

=== 2001–2003: Greatest Hits and Heart Strings ===
On 14 September 2001, Tyler released Greatest Hits, a compilation album containing 17 tracks. It entered the UK Albums Chart at No. 18 and was certified silver by the British Phonographic Industry (BPI) for sales of over 60,000 units. Greatest Hits also reached the Top 10 in five other European countries.

In 2002, she began working on her 13th studio album, Heart Strings. EMI approached her with the idea of recording a covers album with an orchestra and Tyler's band. She selected 13 songs by artists including U2, the Beatles, and Bruce Springsteen. The arrangements were written by Nick Ingman and Karl Jenkins and performed by the City of Prague Philharmonic Orchestra. Heart Strings was released on 18 March 2003 and was followed by a tour in Germany. The album charted in three European countries.

=== 2004–2005: Success in France ===
In 2003, vocalist Kareen Antonn invited Tyler to re-record "Total Eclipse of the Heart" as a bilingual duet in French and English. The new version, re-titled "Si demain... (Turn Around)" was released in December 2003. It went to No. 1 in Belgium and France, where it remained at the top for 10 weeks and sold over 500,000 units. The success of the single was regarded as Tyler's comeback in France and received strongly positive reviews from music critics.

Tyler's 14th studio album, Simply Believe, was released in April 2004. It featured seven new songs alongside various re-recordings and covers. Tyler and Antonn recorded "Si tout s'arrête (It's a Heartache)" as a second bilingual duet. It peaked at No. 12 in France. Tyler co-wrote the title track and two additional songs with producer Jean Lahcene. Simply Believe spent 23 weeks on the French Album Charts and peaked at No. 18.

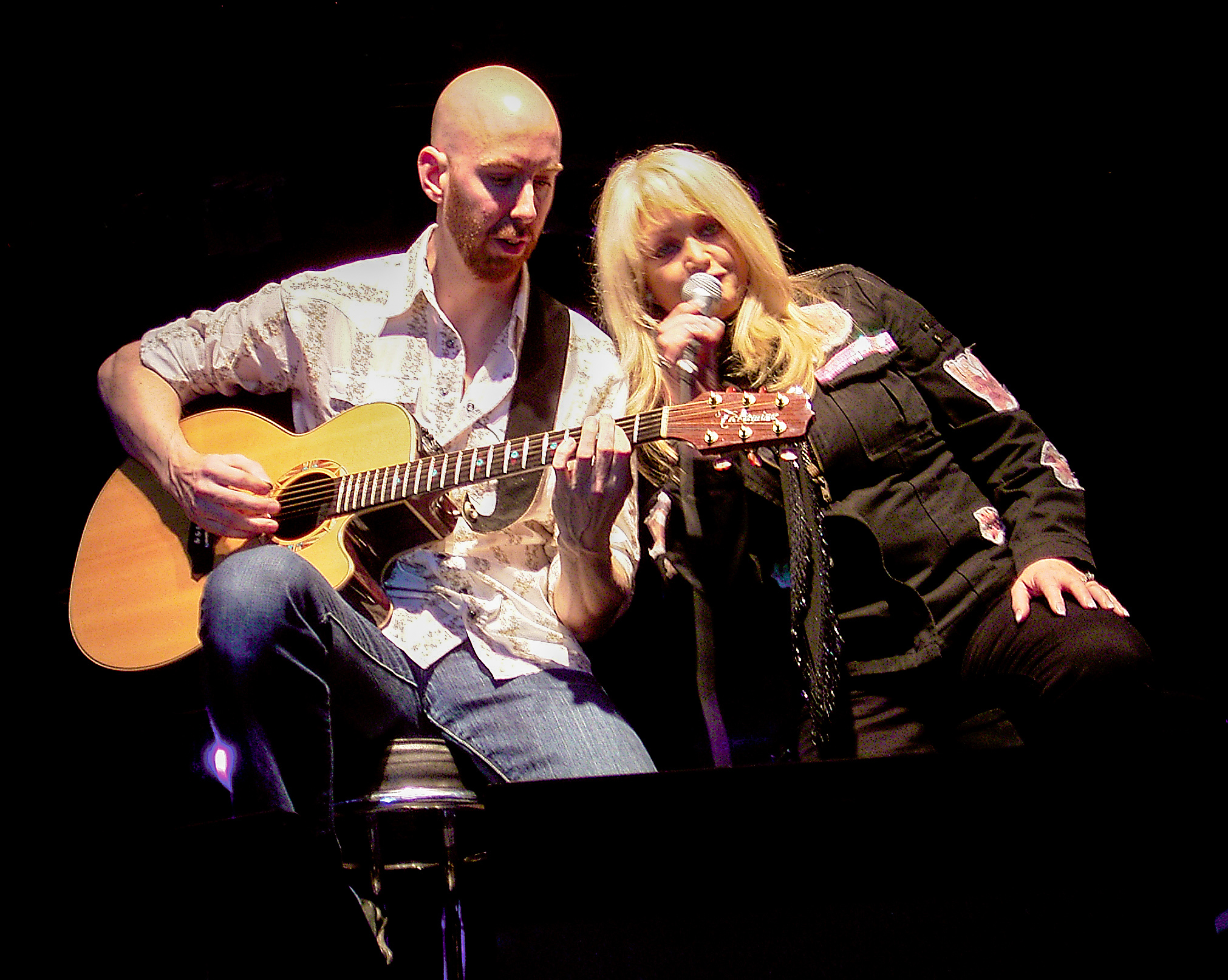
Tyler with Matt Prior in an acoustic concert in Familiengarten Eberswalde on 27 May 2006

Tyler released her 15th studio album, Wings, in spring 2005. Recorded in Paris, it featured 12 new songs, two of which were also recorded in French, as well as new versions of "Total Eclipse of the Heart" and "It's a Heartache". She promoted the album with an extensive European tour, including a televised performance at the Sopot International Song Festival in Poland and recorded concerts at La Cigale in Paris and at the Fiestas del Pilar in Zaragoza, Spain. Footage from all three concerts appeared on Tyler's live DVD Bonnie on Tour, released in 2006. Wings came out in the UK in 2006 under the title Celebrate. Tyler also received the Lifetime Achievement Steiger Award in 2005.

In 2004, a version of "Holding Out for a Hero" was recorded by Jennifer Saunders for the Shrek 2 soundtrack.

=== 2006–2011: From the Heart: Greatest Hits and Best of 3 CD ===
In 2006, Tyler made her first appearance on US television in several years when she performed "Total Eclipse of the Heart" with actress Lucy Lawless on Celebrity Duets. In January 2007, Tyler recorded a new version of the song with the punk band BabyPinkStar. It peaked at No. 40 on the UK Independent Singles chart. In March, she released From the Heart: Greatest Hits, which reached No. 2 in Ireland and No. 31 in the UK.

In April 2009, Tyler joined Welsh male voice choir Only Men Aloud! on their UK tour to perform "Total Eclipse of the Heart". They recorded the song for their second studio album Band of Brothers, which was released in October. Also in 2009, she recorded the title song for Mal Pope's musical Cappuccino Girls, and performed it on opening night at Swansea's Grand Theatre. Tyler also made a cameo on Hollyoaks Later, singing "Holding Out for a Hero" in a dream sequence featuring Carmel McQueen (Gemma Merna).

"Something Going On" (with Wayne Warner)
A sample of Wayne Warner and Bonnie Tyler's 2010 single "Something Going On", a prelude to Tyler's return to country music with her 2013 album Rocks and Honey.

In 2010, Tyler appeared in a television advertisement for MasterCard, singing a parody of "Total Eclipse of the Heart". She released "Something Going On" with Country singer Wayne Warner and a new version of "Making Love (Out of Nothing At All)" with Matt Pétrin in July and August respectively. In October, she toured Australia and New Zealand with Robin Gibb.

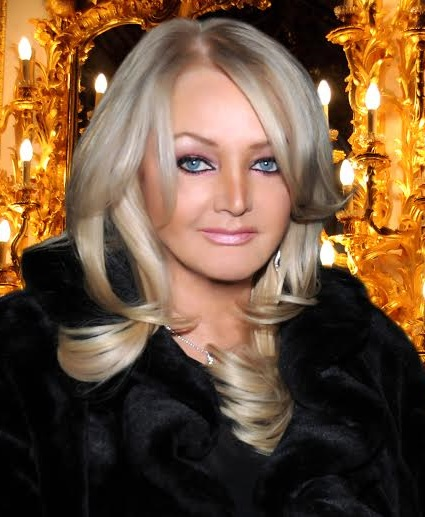
Tyler in 2011

In 2011, Tyler appeared on the Swedish TV show Kvällen är din, performing "Total Eclipse of the Heart" with singer Niklas Paulström. Tyler also performed "It's a Heartache". She made a guest appearance in the music video "Newport (Ymerodraeth State of Mind)", a parody of Jay-Z and Alicia Keys' "Empire State of Mind" for BBC Comic Relief. That year, Tyler received an award at the BMI London Awards after "It's a Heartache" surpassed three million airplays on US television and radio since its release in 1977. She also appeared on the Ukrainian version of The X Factor as one of three British guests, alongside Kylie Minogue and Cher Lloyd, performing "It's a Heartache", "Total Eclipse of the Heart" and "Holding Out for a Hero". In December 2011, a portrait of Tyler by Rolf Harris, owned by Cathy Sims, was valued at £50,000 on BBC's Antiques Roadshow.

In September 2011, Tyler released a new compilation, Best of 3 CD, which charted at no. 36 in France. The album included a cover of "Eternal Flame" by The Bangles, recorded as a French‑English duet with Laura Zen and released as a single.

=== 2012–2018: Rocks and Honey and the Eurovision Song Contest ===
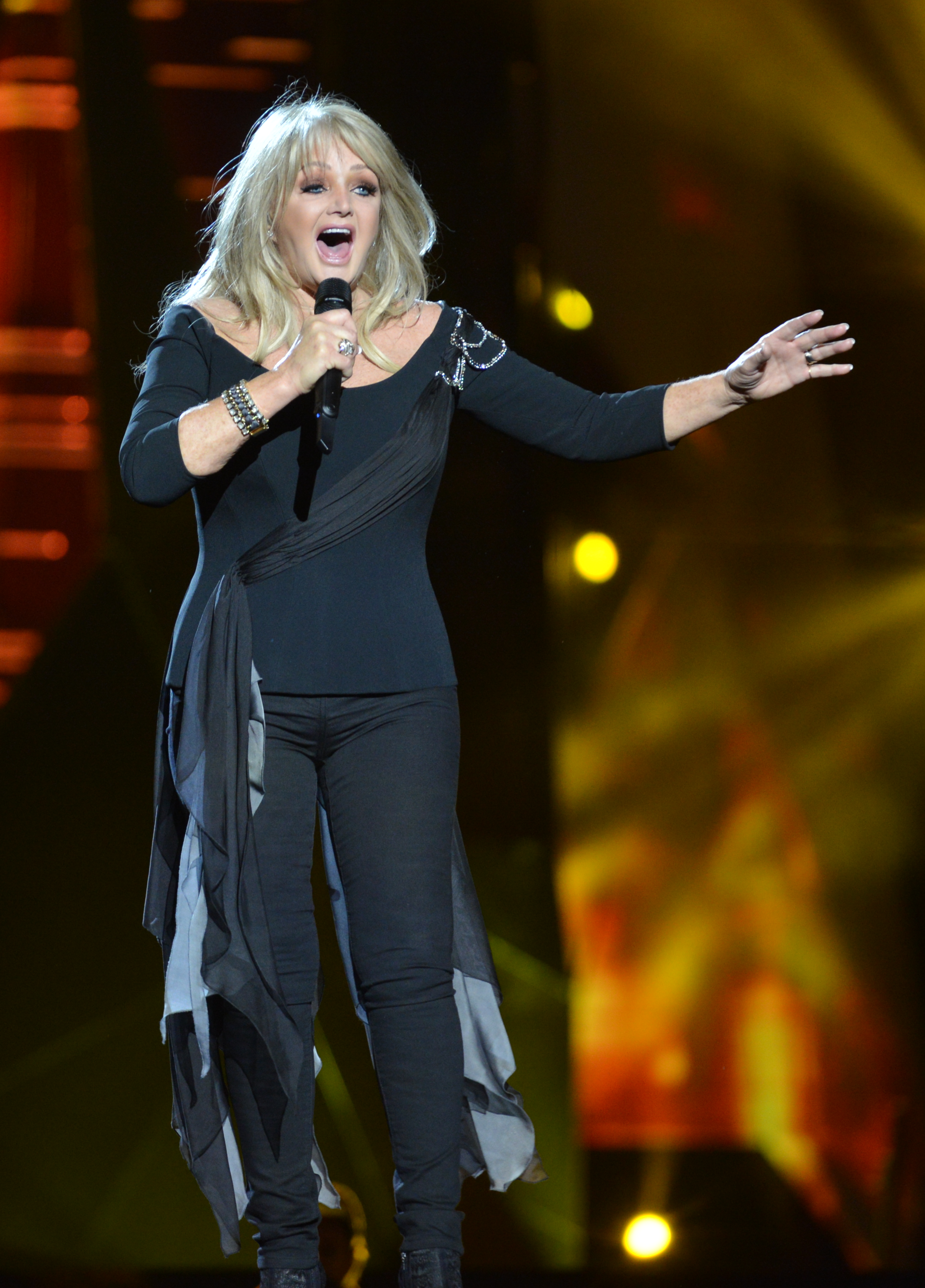
Tyler rehearsing for the Eurovision Song Contest 2013 in Malmö, Sweden, where she represented the United Kingdom

In early 2012, Tyler began working on her 16th album, Rocks and Honey. She travelled to Nashville in search of material, and recorded the album at Blackbird Studios with producer David Huff from White Heart. Tyler sent the album to the BBC ahead of its release for feedback. After hearing the third track "Believe in Me", they asked her to represent the UK with the song at the Eurovision Song Contest 2013. Although initially reluctant, Tyler accepted, describing Eurovision as "great publicity for my album".

Tyler was announced as the UK's entrant on 7 March 2013 and received mixed reaction. "Believe in Me" was released on 13 March and peaked at No. 93 in the UK. As a member of the "Big Five", the UK automatically qualified for the Eurovision Grand Final on 18 May. Tyler finished in 19th place with 23 points. Reacting to the results, she said, "I did the best that I could do with a great song", adding, "I'm so glad and so happy that I did it because it was an incredible experience. It was like the Grammy Awards all over again." After the contest, Tyler became the first UK representative to receive a Eurovision Song Contest Radio Award, winning Best Song and Best Female Singer.

Rocks and Honey was released on 6 May 2013 in the UK and peaked at no. 52 on the UK Albums Chart. The album title referred to the contrast between Tyler and Vince Gill's voice on their duet "What You Need from Me", which was likened to "rocks and honey". "This Is Gonna Hurt" and "Love Is the Knife" were released as the second and third singles in August and September 2013 respectively, although neither charted. In 2014, Tyler released "Miserere" on Rhydian Roberts's album One Day like This, and "Fortune" on Spike's album 100% Pure Frankie Miller.

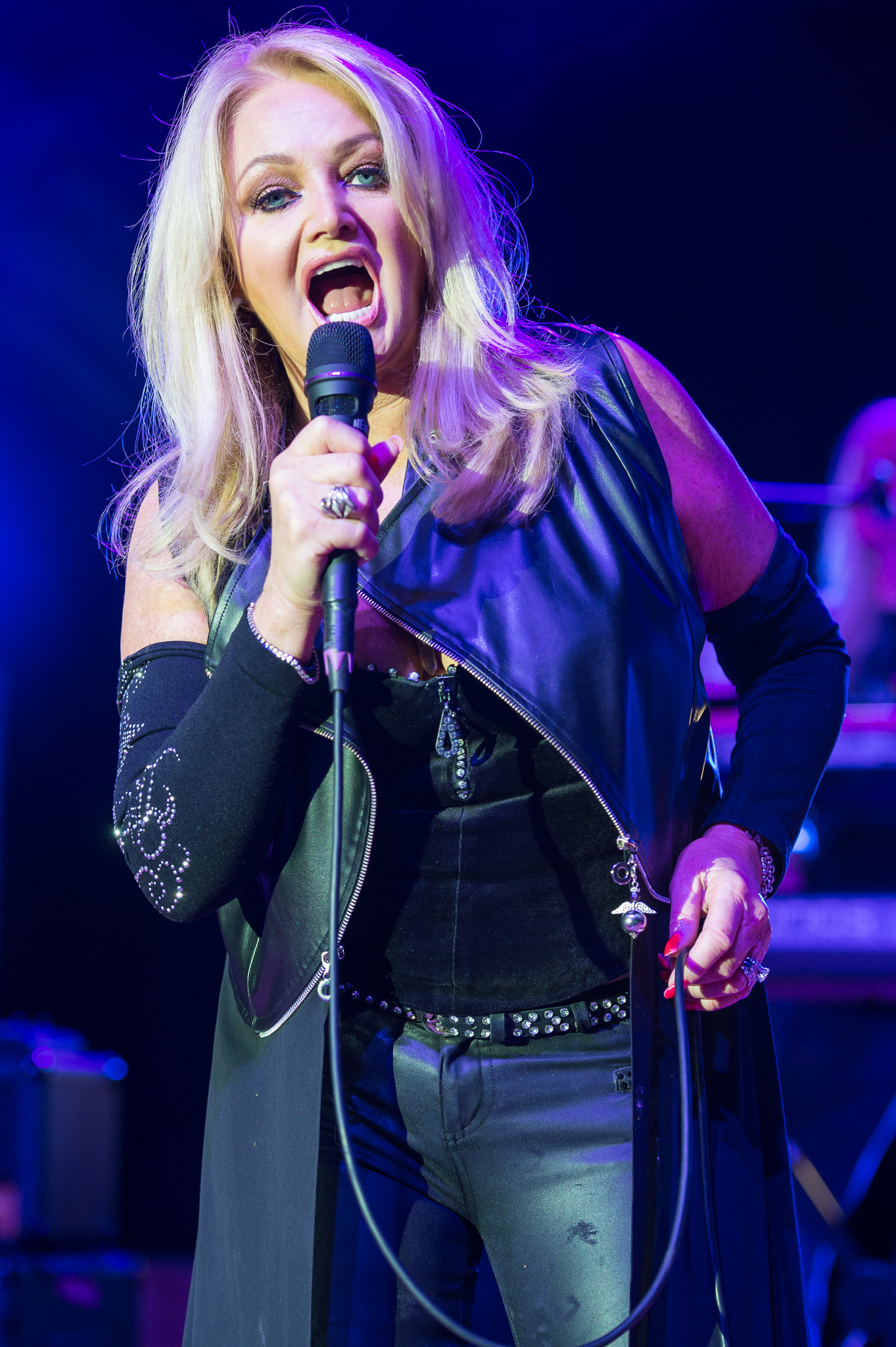
Tyler performing on her Greatest Hits Tour in November 2016

In June 2015, Tyler appeared on Die schönsten Disney Songs aller Zeiten, a one-off televised celebration of Disney music in Germany, performing "Circle of Life" from The Lion King. In September 2015, she performed "Total Eclipse of the Heart" and "Holding Out for a Hero" on Best Time Ever with Neil Patrick Harris, Nicole Scherzinger, and Alec Baldwin. In 2016, Tyler was featured on Frankie Miller's album Double Take. She toured New Zealand in January 2017 as part of her 'Timeless Summer Tour'. In March 2017, she released a new single, "Love's Holding On" with German metal band Axel Rudi Pell.

Tyler played a 7-date 'Australian Greatest Hits' Tour in late May to early June 2017. In August 2017, Tyler performed "Total Eclipse of the Heart" aboard the MS Oasis of the Seas with American dance-rock band DNCE to mark the solar eclipse of 21 August 2017. The song had an increase of 31,000 online downloads, leading to a placement at no. 13 on the Billboard Digital Songs chart. In November, she released a new compilation, Remixes and Rarities, which debuted numerous tracks from her back catalogue that had not previously appeared on CD. In March 2018, Tyler embarked on a 22-date tour of Germany and Austria to celebrate the 40th anniversary of "It's a Heartache", with Sharron Levy as support.

=== 2019–2026: Later albums and final projects ===
In February 2019, Tyler released "Hold On" as the lead single from her 17th studio album, Between the Earth and the Stars. The album followed in March and peaked at no. 34 on the UK Albums Chart. It was recorded with David Mackay, who had produced Tyler's first two albums in the 1970s. Between the Earth and the Stars featured three duets with Rod Stewart, Francis Rossi, and Cliff Richard. Tyler embarked on a 23‑date European tour in April 2019, culminating in an appearance at BBC Proms in the Park in Hyde Park and a headline concert at the London Palladium in September. Her show at L'Olympia in Paris was filmed and released through Canal+. In August 2019, Cherry Red Records issued a box set compiling Tyler's first four studio albums. Classic Pop described The RCA Years as "a thoroughly-researched 4CD-set". In November 2019, Tyler made a guest appearance at Ben Zucker's concert at the Mercedes-Benz Arena in Berlin to sing "It's a Heartache". Their duet appeared on his live album, Wer Sagt das?! Zugabe!, released in May 2020.

In December 2019, Tyler released a new version of her 2005 song "Streets of Stone" for The World's Big Sleep Out, an international homeless charity event. On 14 December, she performed at the Vatican's annual Concerto di Natale in the presence of Pope Francis. In May 2020, Tyler released "Through Thick and Thin (I'll Stand by You)" with Lorraine Crosby as a charity single in aid of the Teenage Cancer Trust. It reached No. 64 on the UK Downloads Chart. Her latest studio album, The Best Is Yet to Come, followed in February 2021.

On 2 September 2022, Tyler and Mike Batt released their duet "Into the Sunset" as a digital single. The track had originally appeared on the soundtrack to The Dreamstone in 1990. In October 2022, Tyler performed "Total Eclipse of the Heart" live with the cast of Tanz der Vampire in Stuttgart, Germany to mark the musical's 25th anniversary. In November 2022, Tyler embarked on her first tour of South America, with eight dates in Brazil, and a performance in Uruguay. Her memoir, Straight from the Heart, was published by Coronet Books on 28 September 2023.

On 19 April 2024, Tyler released her third live album, In Berlin, recorded at the Admiralspalast during her Between the Earth and the Stars Live Tour on 8 May 2019. The album was preceded by its first single, "Faster Than the Speed of Night", on 22 March 2024. In September 2024, Tyler performed at the Plein Hotel for an event hosted by Philipp Plein as part of Milan Fashion Week in Milan, Italy. On 31 December 2024, Tyler performed her new single, "Yes I Can", on Silvester-Schlagerbooom 2025.

On 4 July 2025, Tyler released "Together", produced by David Guetta and Hypaton. It reached No. 4 on the French Airplay chart and was certified Gold for an equivalent of 15 million streams. The track featured newly recorded vocals from Tyler, with lyrics interpolated from the chorus of "Total Eclipse of the Heart". In March 2026, Tyler released "Only Love" and premiered it live during a concert at the O2 Shepherd's Bush Empire in London.

On 24 April 2026, Tyler debuted her final song "One World One Home". The poignant track serves as the emotional anchor for the social-impact documentary Homeless, directed by Valerio Zanoli. The song features a special backup performance by the Dallas Street Choir, a musical organisation that provides a creative outlet for individuals affected by housing insecurity. The lyrics were written by Valerio Zanoli, and the music was composed by Valentino Favotto. All profits from the song's sales and the documentary's distribution are dedicated to securing affordable housing for underprivileged families.

On 13 November 2026, Tyler's final recording, "Love, Light and Peace", was released as her first posthumous single. The song was written by Terry Britten and Chrissie Hammond, and produced by Britten and David Mackay.

== Artistry ==
=== Influences ===
Tyler's two biggest influences from a young age were Janis Joplin and Tina Turner. She cited "River Deep – Mountain High" as being her all-time favourite song. Other artists who influenced Tyler in her youth included Aretha Franklin, Wilson Pickett, Meat Loaf, Joe Cocker, Dusty Springfield and Tommy Steele. She also expressed admiration for contemporary artists such as Guns N' Roses, Anastacia, Toni Braxton, Duffy, Sheryl Crow, Britney Spears, Lulu, Blondie, Bryan Adams, Alanis Morissette, and Eminem, and said she hoped to collaborate with Adele, whom she called "a great song writer, singer and performer." When she was asked to list influences and artists she admired, besides naming several, she said there are so many "great girl singers out there".

=== Vocal style ===
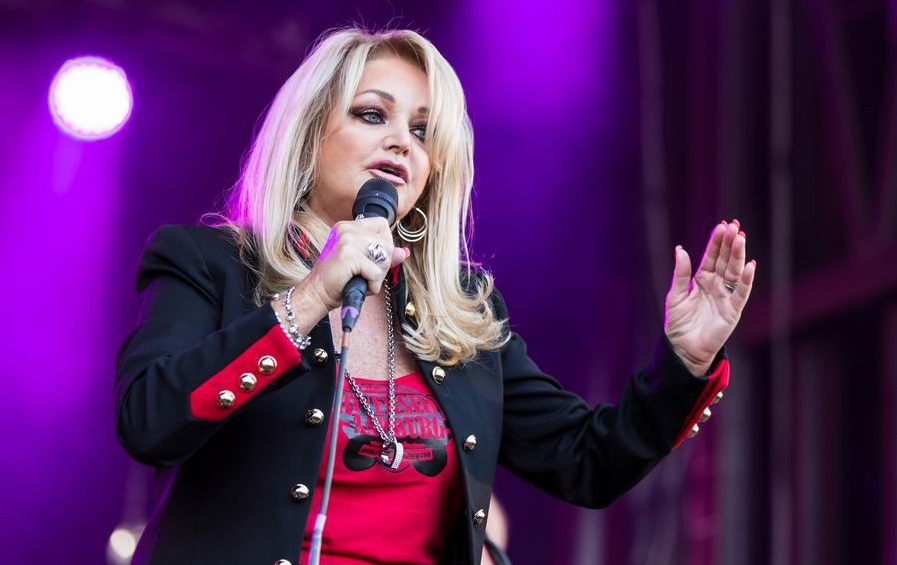
Tyler singing, 2015

Tyler's music contained elements of country, rock, pop, blues and Celtic. Her voice was likened to Rod Stewart and Kim Carnes following her vocal-cord nodule operation in the 1970s, and she was sometimes referred to as "the female Rod Stewart". After her collaborations with Steinman, she was also dubbed "the female Meat Loaf". Soon after her operation, while recording her second album, Natural Force, the studio band complimented the change in her voice. Reviewers from AllMusic described Tyler's voice as "inimitable", "wonderfully gritty", and an "effective instrument" that drew notice to her first managers, Scott and Wolfe.

In a review of Rocks and Honey, OMH Media said that Tyler's vocals as being "good for only one thing and that's belting out gravelly vocals", suggesting that she sounded like Johnny Cash in his later years when she "tries to restrain [her voice]". With reference to her modern voice, The Yorkshire Times wrote that Tyler's vocals had "still got what it takes to make you tingle". Steinman told People that he wrote "Total Eclipse of the Heart" as a "showpiece for [Tyler's] voice". AllMusic said that her voice "produced the perfect type of 'desperate lovelorn' effect to suit the romantic lyrics".

=== Songwriting ===
Though songwriting had never been a significant part of Tyler's career, she co-wrote a handful of B-Sides and other tracks. "Gonna Get Better", a B-Side to the 1980 Japanese single "Sayonara Tokyo", was written with her brother, Paul Hopkins. In 2001, Tyler co-wrote four songs with Gary Pickford-Hopkins on his GPH album, and duetted with him on the track "Loving You Means Leaving You". Tyler was also involved in writing several tracks for her 2005 album Wings, including its singles "Louise" and "Celebrate".

== Philanthropy ==
Tyler featured in three charity supergroups. In 1986, she joined the Anti-Heroin Project to record "It's a Live-In World", with proceeds donated to the Phoenix House Charities, which funded heroin recovery centres in the UK. In 1987, she appeared as a chorus vocalist in the British-American charity group Ferry Aid, who released a cover of the Beatles' "Let It Be", to support victims of the Zeebrugge Disaster. The single sold over 500,000 copies in the UK and topped the charts for three weeks. In 1990, Tyler joined Rock Against Repatriation to record a cover of "Sailing", released as a protest against the repatriation of Vietnamese boat people who had fled to Hong Kong. The single peaked at No. 89 on the UK singles chart.

From the 1990s, Tyler was a patron of the Bobath Children's Therapy Centre in Cardiff, Wales, which provides care for children with cerebral palsy. In 2013, she campaigned for Bobath to be recognised at the Pride of Britain Awards. She was also an ambassador for the Noah's Ark Children's Hospital for Wales. In January 2005, Tyler performed at the Rock for Asia benefit concert in Ingolstadt, Germany, raising funds for the victims of the 2004 Indian Ocean earthquake and tsunami; the event was recorded and released on DVD. In 2007, she recorded "I Don't Know How to Love Him" for Over the Rainbow, a charity album conceptualised by Anneka Rice on Challenge Anneka. The album reached No. 1 on the UK Compilation Chart, with proceeds going to the Association of Children's Hospices.

On 1 November 2009, Tyler performed as the headline act at the Pinktober Women in Rock concert at the Royal Albert Hall in London. In 2010, she co-headlined a benefit concert with Leo Sayer in New Zealand, raising funds for Variety, the Children's Charity. In 2012, Tyler was named patron of the AAG animal charity association in Guia, Portugal. She re-recorded "Holding Out for a Hero" for the 2013 Children in Need appeal. In 2014, she endorsed the BUAV's campaign to make it mandatory for animals used in testing laboratories to be re-homed. In 2020, Tyler contributed to a cover of the Alan Parsons Project's "Don't Answer Me" to raise funds for Bergamo, an Italian city severely affected by the COVID-19 pandemic.

On 24 April 2026, Tyler released "One World One Home" as a philanthropic charity single to raise funds and awareness for the unhoused. Recorded specifically for the documentary film Homeless directed by Valerio Zanoli, the track features a musical collaboration with the Dallas Street Choir, an ensemble comprised entirely of individuals affected by homelessness. It was the final original song that Tyler released before she died.

== Personal life ==
In July 1973, Tyler and Robert Sullivan, a property developer and 1972 Olympic judo competitor, married. They had no children; Tyler miscarried when she was 39. From 1988, Tyler and her husband owned a five-bedroom home near Santa Eulália Beach in Albufeira, Algarve, in southern Portugal. She had recorded one of her albums there in the late 1970s, and the couple spent much of the year there. In 2005, Tyler was filmed in the Algarve for Zacisze gwiazd (Stars' Retreat), a Polish TV show which showcased actors' and musicians' houses.

Tyler and Sullivan invested in property. In a May 1999 interview, she mentioned that they owned farmland in Portugal and New Zealand (for at least the first 12 years she owned land in the latter, she never visited it, it merely being an investment), 22 houses in Berkshire and London, and 65 stables offering horse-boarding services. In a 2013 interview, she said that the farm in New Zealand had been converted to a dairy farm 12 years after they purchased the land, and that she and Sullivan also owned a quarry.

== Illness and death ==
On 6 May 2026, Tyler underwent emergency surgery in Faro, Portugal, near where she lived, to treat a perforated intestine, and was placed in an induced coma in the intensive care unit. When doctors attempted to bring her out of the coma, she suffered a cardiac arrest and was resuscitated. On 12 May, her spokesman said she remained seriously ill but stable, and that her doctors were optimistic about her making a full recovery. On 15 June, Tyler woke up from the medically induced coma, although she remained "very unwell". She died from complications of the illness on 8 July at the age of 75. On 15 August, thousands lined the streets of Mumbles in Swansea for the procession of her coffin to her home. Her funeral was held two days later at Swansea Minster, where Only Men Aloud! performed her song "Total Eclipse of the Heart".

Many famous singers, actors, producers, royalty, and politicians showed their respect and remembered the singer. Catherine Zeta-Jones, a cousin of Tyler's husband, said her heart was "broken" at her death. Sir Cliff Richard called her "another wonderful friend gone too soon", while Bryan Adams said she "had such a great voice". Carol Vorderman said Tyler's music represented "fighting and power and living life without apology". A Downing Street spokesman said Prime Minister Keir Starmer was "saddened" by the news and described Tyler as "one of Britain's greatest recording artists". The Prince and Princess of Wales said they were "deeply saddened" by her death and described her as a "proud Welsh icon".

== Discography ==
Studio albums

- The World Starts Tonight (1977)
- Natural Force (1978)
- Diamond Cut (1979)
- Goodbye to the Island (1981)
- Faster Than the Speed of Night (1983)
- Secret Dreams and Forbidden Fire (1986)
- Hide Your Heart (1988) also known as Notes From America
- Bitterblue (1991)
- Angel Heart (1992)
- Silhouette in Red (1993)
- Free Spirit (1995)
- All in One Voice (1998)
- Heart Strings (2003) also known as Heart & Soul
- Simply Believe (2004)
- Wings (2005) also known as Celebrate
- Rocks and Honey (2013)
- Between the Earth and the Stars (2019)
- The Best Is Yet to Come (2021)

== Honours, awards and recognition ==
"Total Eclipse of the Heart" and "It's a Heartache" have estimated sales of over six million units each. Tyler's 1976 breakthrough with "Lost in France" led to her nomination for Best British Female Newcomer at the 1977 Brit Awards. In the 1980s, she received nominations for two further Brit Awards and three Grammy Awards. In 2013, she was presented with the Gold Badge award by the British Academy of Songwriters, Composers and Authors (BASCA). In 1979, Tyler won the 10th World Popular Song Festival with "Sitting on the Edge of the Ocean", representing the United Kingdom. She also became the first, and so far only, UK representative to receive a Eurovision Song Contest Radio Award, winning in 2013. Additionally, she was one of the first Western artists to tour the Soviet Union.

Alongside her music awards, Tyler received several local honours in Wales. She was named freeman of Neath Port Talbot in 2011, and received an honorary D.Litt from Swansea University in 2013. She was also made an Honorary Fellow of the Royal Welsh College of Music & Drama. In 2016, she was honoured by the Lord Mayor of Swansea for Services to Music. Tyler was appointed Member of the Order of the British Empire (MBE) in the 2022 Birthday Honours for services to music.

== See also ==
- List of artists who reached number one on the UK singles chart
- List of artists who reached number one in the United States
- List of British Grammy winners and nominees

== Bibliography ==
- Bohlen, Dieter; Kessler, Katja (2002). Nichts als die Wahrheit [Nothing But the Truth] (in German). Ullstein Heyne List GmbH & Co. KG. ISBN 978-3-453-86143-5.
- Roberts, David (2004). Guinness World Records: British Hit Singles and Albums. London: Guinness World Records Limited. p. 165. ISBN 978-0-85112-199-4.
- Tyler, Bonnie (2023). Straight from the Heart. Hodder & Stoughton. ISBN 978-1-39972-625-2.

Preceded by Engelbert Humperdinck with "Love Will Set You Free"	UK in the Eurovision Song Contest; 2013	Succeeded by Molly Smitten-Downes with "Children of the Universe"
