= Robert Sullivan (judoka) =

British judoka (born 1949)

Personal information
- Full name: John Robert Sullivan
- Nationality: British
- Born: 19 June 1944 (age 82)
- Occupation: Judoka
- Spouse: Bonnie Tyler (m. 1973; died 2026)
- Relative: Catherine Zeta-Jones (cousin)

Sport
- Sport: Judo

John Robert Sullivan (born 19 June 1944) is a British former judoka. He competed in the men's half-middleweight event at the 1972 Summer Olympics. In 1973 he married Welsh singer Bonnie Tyler.

== Career ==
=== Athletic career ===
Sullivan was a prominent competitive judoka in the early 1970s, competing in the men's half-middleweight division. At the 1972 Summer Olympics in Munich, he represented Great Britain at the Olympic Games, where he placed 18th overall. European Team Championships: He won a silver medal representing Great Britain at the 1972 championships held in the Netherlands.

=== Business and property ===
Following his retirement from sports, Sullivan became a successful property developer. Alongside his wife, Bonnie Tyler, he managed an extensive international real estate portfolio that included residential and commercial properties in the UK, Portugal, and New Zealand.

== Personal life ==
Sullivan married Welsh singer Gaynor Hopkins, known professionally as Bonnie Tyler, on 14 July 1973. The couple remained together for over 50 years until her death from medical complications in July 2026. They did not have children.

The couple divided their time between homes in Mumbles, South Wales, and Albufeira, Portugal. They also own a farm in New Zealand. Sullivan is a cousin of Academy Award-winning actress Catherine Zeta-Jones.
