= Praia de Santa Eulália =

Beach in Portugal

Praia de Santa Eulália Santa Eulália Beach
- Beach
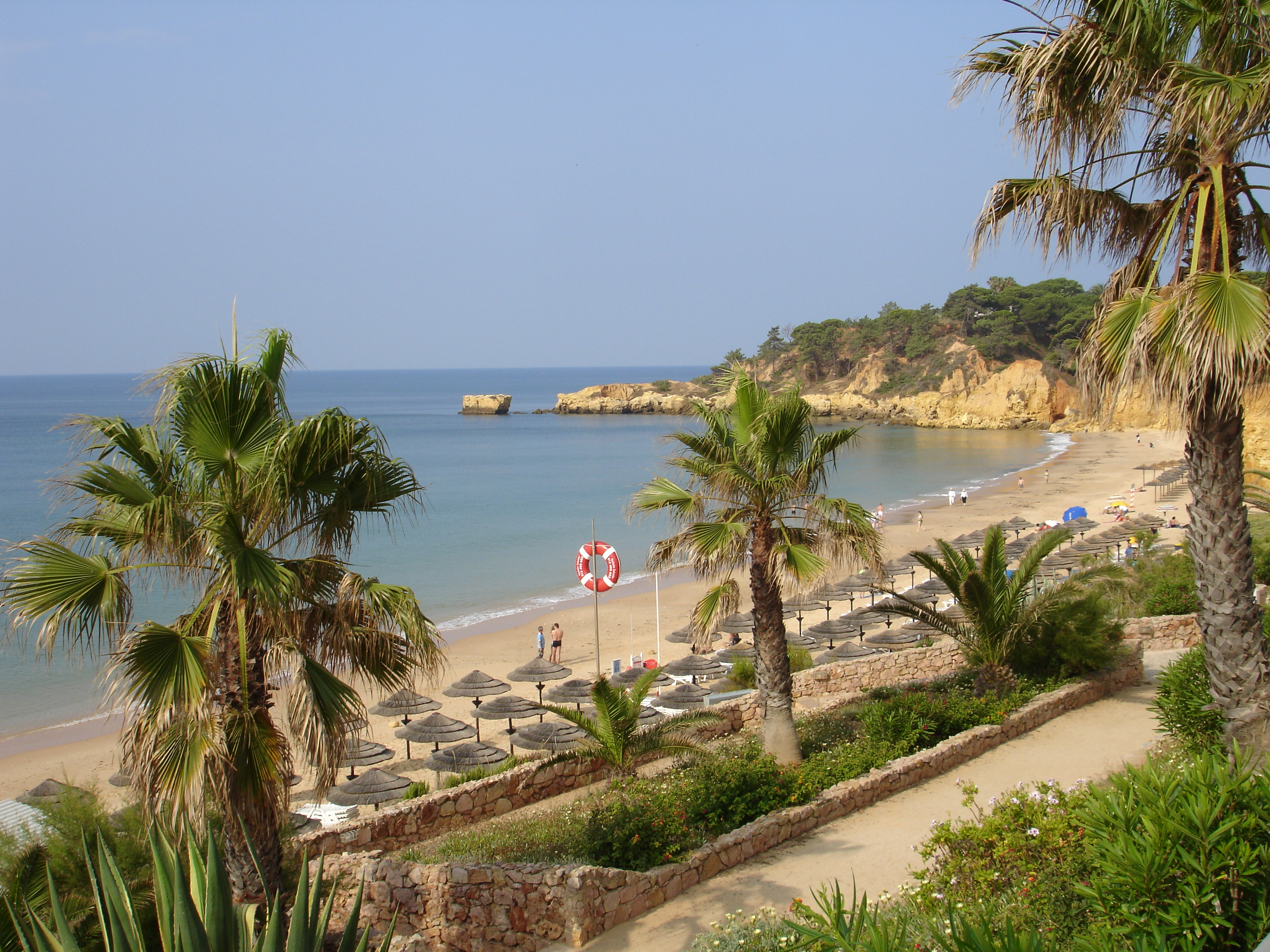
- Santa Eulália Beach, in the Algarve

- Location within Portugal
- Coordinates: 37°5′17″N 8°12′52″W
- Location: Albufeira, Algarve, Portugal

Praia de Santa Eulália is a beach within the municipality of Albufeira, in the Algarve, Portugal. The beach is 2.7 miles (4.3 km) east of the town of Albufeira and is 20.5 miles (33.0 km) west of the regions capital of Faro. In 2012 Praia de Santa Eulália has been designated a Blue Flag beach. This beach is adjacent to the famous Balaia Beach.

== Description ==
Praia de Santa Eulália is a popular rosie beach in the eastern outskirts of the resort town of Albufeira. This well kept beach has blue flag status(2012). The beach is wide with fine golden sand and backed by golden cliffs with a number of nooks and crannies provided by the various rock formations. To the west side of the beach a seasonal watercourse runs down to the sea which is completely dry for the majority of the time. The sea is safe and clean and has an average summer seawater temperature of 20–22 °C (68–72 °F).

=== Car Park ===
To the back of the beach there is a large car park of which some there are allocated parking bays for disabled drivers displaying a European blue badge. Parking can prove very difficult during the busy summer months. From the car park there is a boardwalk down to, and along the beach which provides easy access for wheelchair users.

== Facilities ==
The beach has good access for the disabled having boardwalks running east and west along the back of the beach from the central car park. During the summer season the beach is patrolled by lifeguards. There are Loungers, parasols and Pedalo's which can be hired. There is also a selection of beach bars, shops and restaurants on or close to the beach. There are showers and toilets available loa Just of the beach many types of water sports can be enjoyed, such as windsurfing, water skiing sailing or cruising.

== Gallery ==
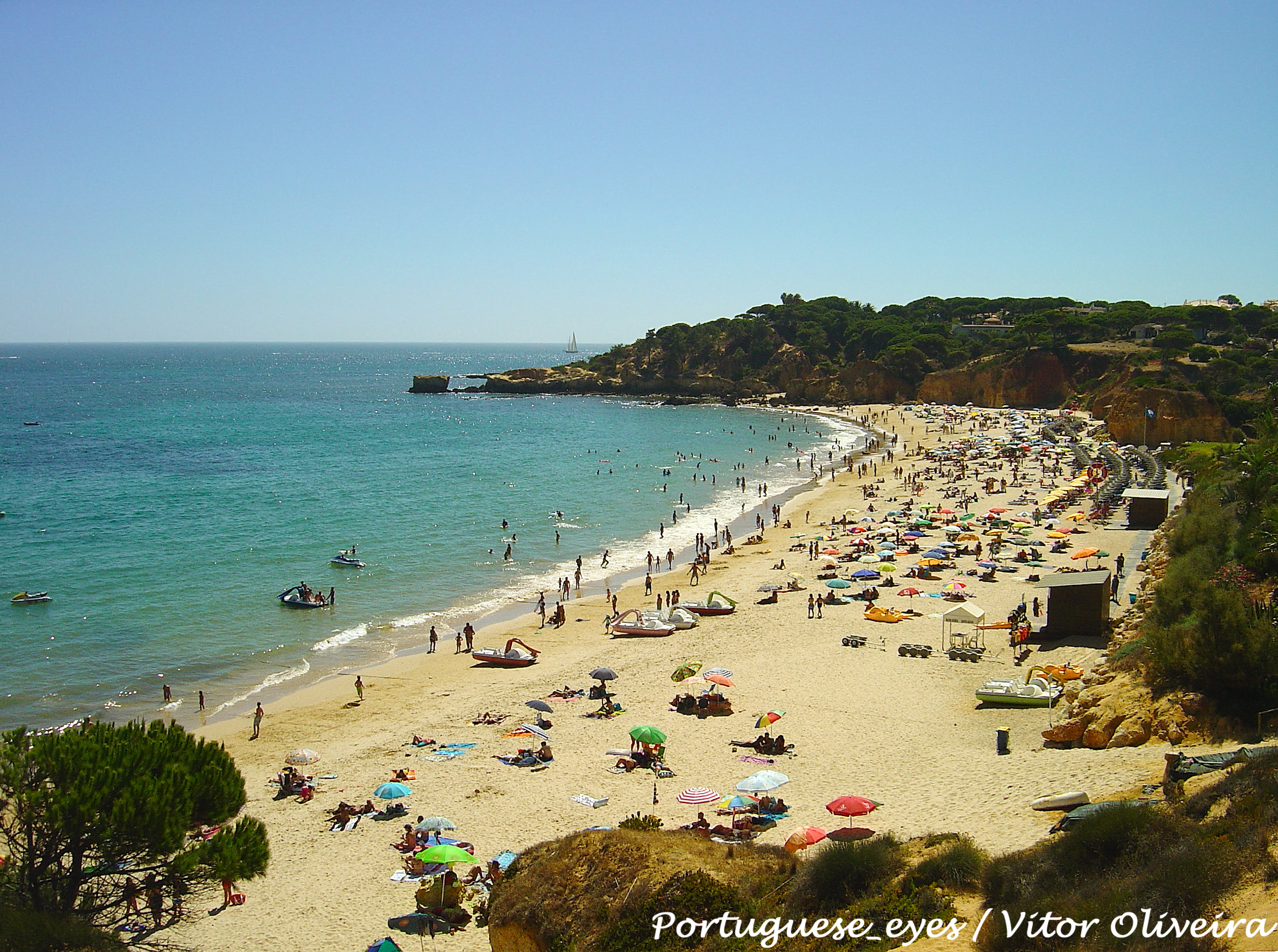
Looking west along the beach

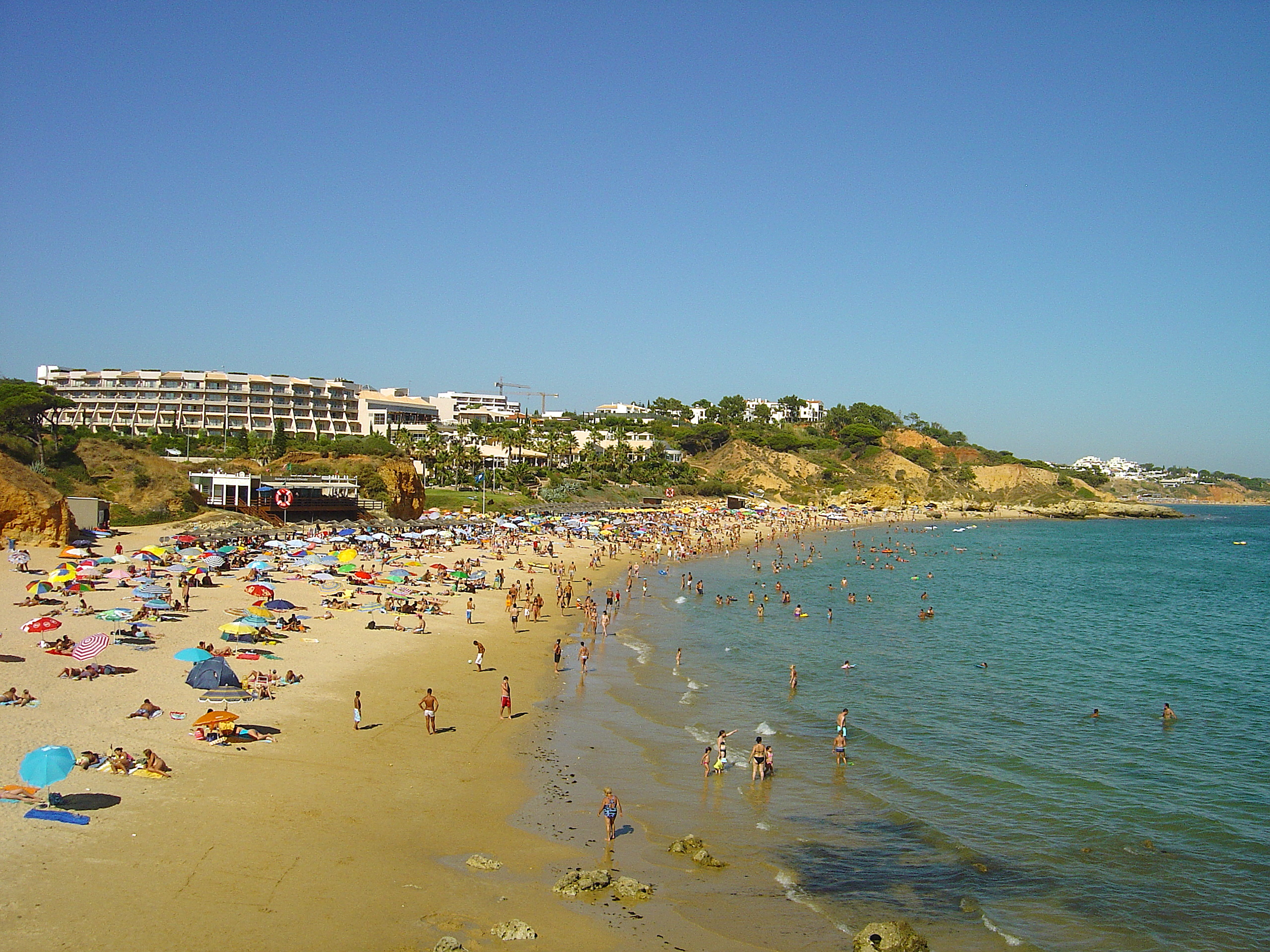
Looking east along the beach

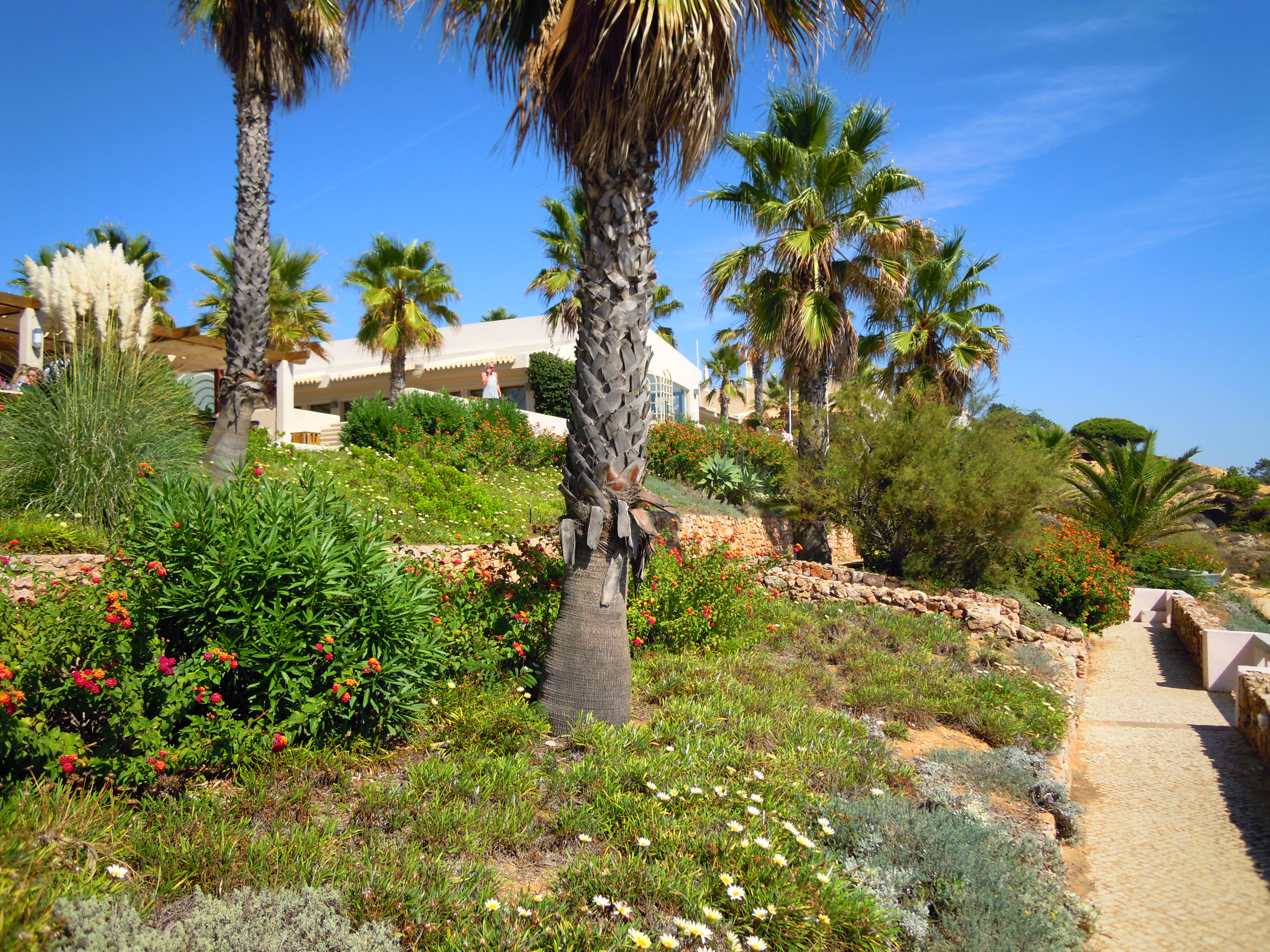
Landscaped gardens at the rear of the beach

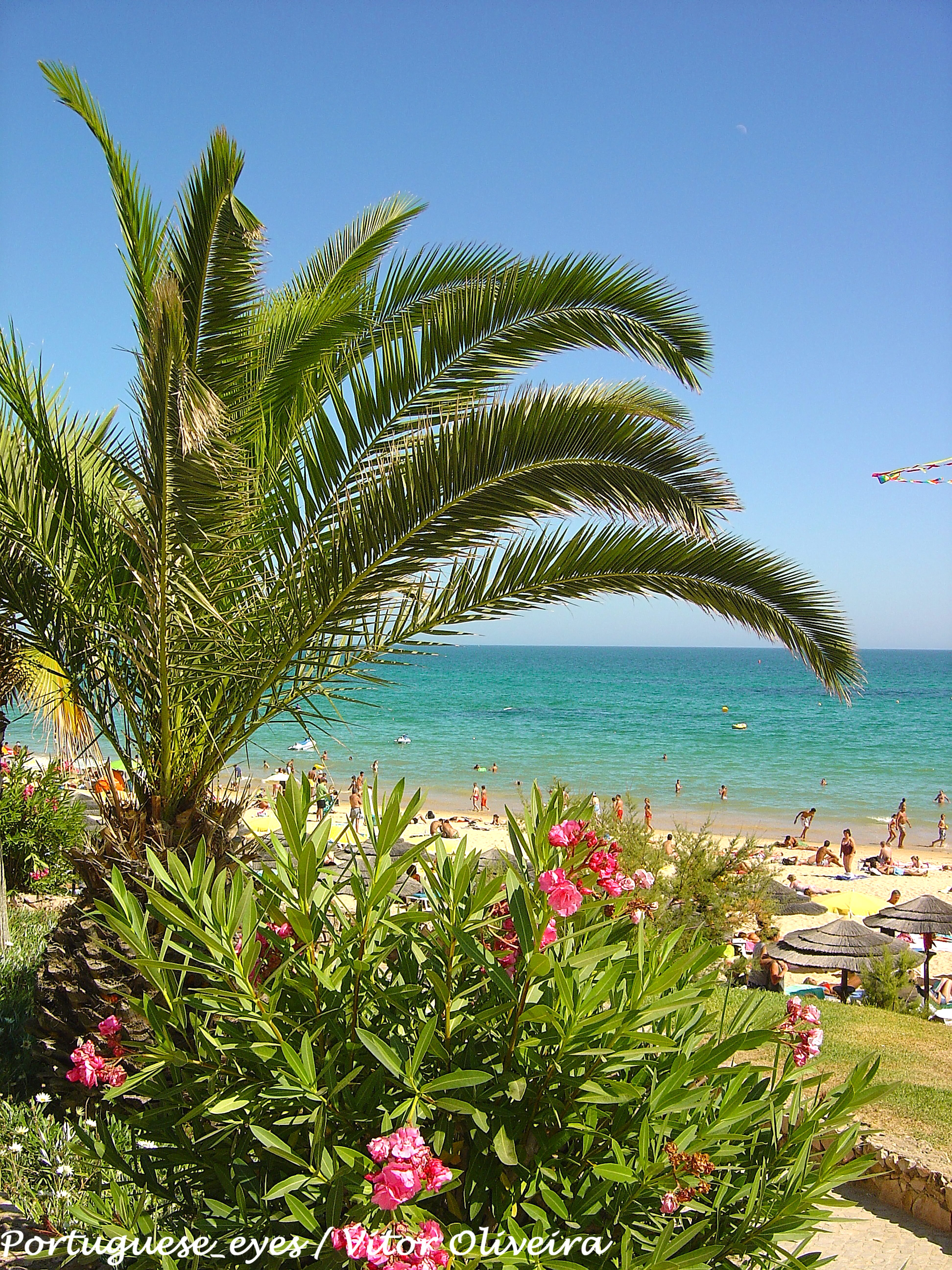
The beach gardens
