= List of awards and nominations received by Bonnie Tyler =

Bonnie Tyler awards and nominations
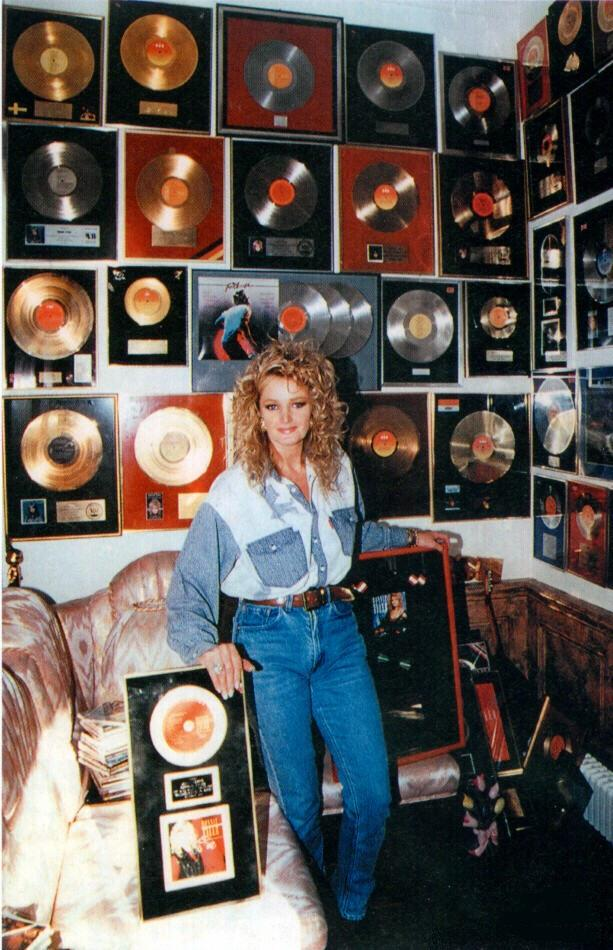
- Tyler at her home in Wales, 1993
Awards and nominations
Award	Wins	Nominations
Goldene Europa	3	3
Grammy Awards	0	3
Brit Awards	0	3
Echo Awards	1	2
American Music Awards	0	2
Steiger Awards	1	1
RSH-GOLD	2	2
Variety Club	1	1
Yamaha Music	1	1
Regenbogen Award	1	1
Billboard	0	19
Cash Box	6	25
BASCA	1	1
Europe 1	1	1
ESC Radio	2	2
Eurovision Portugal	1	1
AMOA	1	1
Record World	4	5
RPM (magazine)	1	1
Billboard Video Award	0	6

Totals (Note: Certain award groups do not simply award one winner. They acknowledge several different recipients, have runners-up, and have third place. Since this is a specific recognition and is different from losing an award, runner-up mentions are considered wins in this award tally. For simplification and to avoid errors, each award in this list has been presumed to have had a prior nomination.)
- Wins: 15
- Nominations: 26

Bonnie Tyler was a Welsh singer who has released seventeenth studio albums. Her career led to three Goldene Europa awards, an Echo Award, a Variety Club of Great Britain Award, a Gold Badge Award for her contribution to Britain's Music Industry, and a Steiger Award for a lifetime career in music. Tyler represented the United Kingdom at the World Popular Song Festival in 1979, winning the festival with her song "Sitting on the Edge of the Ocean". She later represented the United Kingdom at the Eurovision Song Contest in 2013.

== Awards and nominations ==
Award	Year (Note: Indicates the year of ceremony. Each year is linked to the article about the awards held that year, wherever possible.)	Recipient(s) and nominee(s)	Category	Result	Ref.
Academy of Country Music Awards	1978	Bonnie Tyler	Top New Female Vocalist	Nominated	
American Music Awards	1984	Bonnie Tyler	Favorite Pop/Rock Female Artist	Nominated	
American Music Awards	1984	"Total Eclipse of the Heart"	Favorite Pop/Rock Single	Nominated	
AMOA Jukebox Awards Amusement Expo	1978	"It's a Heartache"	Country Record of the Year	Won	
Bravo Otto	1977	Bonnie Tyler	Female Singer (Gold)	Won	
Brit Awards	1977	Bonnie Tyler	British Female Breakthrough Act	Nominated	
Brit Awards	1984	Bonnie Tyler	British Female Solo Artist	Nominated	
Brit Awards	1986	Bonnie Tyler	British Female Solo Artist	Nominated	
The Ivors Academy	2013	Bonnie Tyler	Gold Badge Award of Merit	Won	
BMI Awards	2011	"It's a Heartache"	Million-Air Award	Won	
Echo Music Prize	1993	Bonnie Tyler	Best Pop/Rock Singer	Nominated	
Echo Music Prize	1994	Bonnie Tyler	Best Pop/Rock Singer	Won	
Europe 1	1979	"It's a Heartache"	Best Foreign Song in France	Won	
Goldene Europa	1978	Bonnie Tyler	Discovery of the Year	Won	
Goldene Europa	1983	Bonnie Tyler	Comeback of the Year	Won	
Goldene Europa	1993	Bonnie Tyler	Best International Singer	Won	
Grammy Awards	1984	"Total Eclipse of the Heart"	Best Pop Solo Female Vocal Performance	Nominated	
Grammy Awards	1984	Faster Than the Speed of Night	Best Female Rock Vocal Performance	Nominated	
Grammy Awards	1985	"Here She Comes"	Best Female Rock Vocal Performance	Nominated	
Ivor Novello Awards	1979	"It's a Heartache"	International Hit of the Year	Nominated	
Midem Chansong Spécial Midem	1979	Bonnie Tyler	Révélation Internationale 78	Won	
NRJ Music Awards	2025	David Guetta, Hypaton & Bonnie Tyler - Together	Collab/Duo International	Nominated	
R.SH Gold	1992	Bonnie Tyler - Bitterblue	Most Successful German-Produced Artist and Catchy Song of the Year	Won	
Radio Regenbogen Awards	1999	Bonnie Tyler	Lifetime Rock International	Won	
Steiger Award	2005	Bonnie Tyler	Lifetime Award	Won	
Variety Club of Great Britain Awards	1984	Bonnie Tyler	Best Recording Artist	Won	
World Popular Song Festival	1979	"Sitting On the Edge of the Ocean"	Grand Prix International	Won	

== Other accolades ==
=== Honours ===
Name of organisation, name of honour, year(s) listed
Organisation	Honour	Year(s)	Ref.
Lord Mayor of Swansea	Services to Music	2016	
Neath Port Talbot County Borough Council	Freeman of Neath Port Talbot	2011	
Royal Welsh College of Music & Drama	Honorary Fellow	2002	
Swansea University	Honorary Doctor of Letters	2013	

=== Listicles ===
Billboard Year End Awards

Year	Nominee / work	Award	Result
1978	Herself	Pop Female Artist	15th place
1978	Herself	Pop New Artist Combined (Male/Female)	16th place
1978	Herself	Pop Single Artist Combined (Male/Female)	14th place
1978	Herself	Pop Female Single Artist	12th place
1978	Herself	New Female Single Artist	2nd place
1978	Herself	New Female Album Artist	6th place
1978	Herself	New Country Single Artist	6th place
1978	It's a Heartache	Pop Singles	24th place
1978	It's a Heartache	Pop Singles Artists	57th place
1978	It's a Heartache	Country Albums	31st place
1978	Herself	Country Albums Artists	26th place
1979	Bonnie Tyler	Top Female Album Artist (World of Country Music)	12th place
1983	Bonnie Tyler	Top Pop Single Artist Combined	17th place
1983	Bonnie Tyler	Top Pop Single	6th place
1983	Bonnie Tyler	Pop Album Artist Female	23rd place
1983	Bonnie Tyler	Top Pop Single Artist Female	5th place
1984	Bonnie Tyler	Top Female Album Artist	17th place
1984	Bonnie Tyler	Top Pop Female Single Artist	10th place
1984	Bonnie Tyler	Top Pop Single Artist	50th place

Cashbox Year End Awards

Year	Nominee / work	Award	Result
1978	Herself	Pop Female Vocalists Singles	4th place
1978	Herself	New Pop Female Vocalists Singles	2nd place
1978	Herself	New Female Vocalists Longest Charted	2nd place
1978	Herself	Female Vocalists Highest Debuts	6th place
1978	Herself	New Female Vocalists Highest Debuts	Won
1978	Herself	A/C Female Vocalists (Pop Single)	3rd place
1978	Herself	Country Female Crossover	3rd place
1978	Herself	Female Vocalists (Pop Album)	9th place
1978	Herself	New Female Vocalists (Pop Album)	Won
1978	Herself	New Female Vocalists Highest Debuts (Pop Album)	Won
1978	Herself	New Female Vocalists Longest Charted	3rd place
1978	It's a Heartache	Top 100 Singles	17th place
1978	Herself	New Female Vocalist (Country Poll)	2nd place
1978	Herself	New Female Vocalist Highest Debuts	4th place
1978	Herself	New Female Vocalist Longest Charted	2nd place
1978	Herself	Female Vocalists (Country)	4th place
1978	Herself	New Female Vocalists (Country)	Won
1978	Herself	New Female Vocalist Highest Debut (Country)	Won
1978	Herself	Top FM Rotation 1978 (Country)	3rd place
1983	Herself	Female (Pop Single)	2nd place
1983	Herself	A/C Female	2nd place
1983	Herself	Female (Pop Album)	3rd place
1983	Herself	Pop Album Female A/C	Won
1983	Total Eclipse of the Heart	Top 100 Singles	5th place
1983	Faster Than The Speed of Night	Top 100 Albums	23rd place

Record World Year End Awards

Year	Nominee / work	Award	Result
1978	Bonnie Tyler	Solista Femenino Extranjera del Año (Spotlight on Spain)	Won
1978	Bonnie Tyler	Most Promising Female Vocalist (Mid Year Award)	Won
1979	It's a Heartache	Top Record Solo Artist	16th place
1979	Bonnie Tyler	Top Female Vocalist	7th place
1979	Bonnie Tyler	Most Promising Female Vocalist	Won
