= Believe in Me (Bonnie Tyler song) =

Song by Bonnie Tyler

Single by Bonnie Tyler

from the album Rocks and Honey
- Released: 13 March 2013
- Recorded: 2012
- Studio: Blackbird (Nashville, Tennessee)
- Genre: Country rock; pop rock
- Length: 3:57 (album version) 3:03 (radio edit)
- Label: Celtic Swan Recordings, ZYX Music
- Songwriters: Desmond Child, Lauren Christy, Christopher Braide
- Producer: David Huff

Bonnie Tyler singles chronology
"Amour Éternel (Eternal Flame)" (2011)	"Believe in Me" (2013)	"This is Gonna Hurt" (2013)

Music video
- "Believe in Me" on YouTube

Audio sample
- file; help

Eurovision Song Contest 2013 entry
- Country: United Kingdom
- Artist: Bonnie Tyler
- Language: English
- Composers: Desmond Child; Lauren Christy; Christopher Braide
- Lyricists: Desmond Child; Lauren Christy; Christopher Braide

Finals performance
- Final result: 19th
- Final points: 23

Entry chronology
- ◄ "Love Will Set You Free" (2012)
- "Children of the Universe" (2014) ►

"Believe in Me" is a song by Welsh singer Bonnie Tyler from her sixteenth studio album Rocks and Honey (2013). American songwriter Desmond Child composed the song with British songwriters Lauren Christy and Christopher Braide. It was released as the album's lead single on 13 March 2013. The song was written to "uplift the world", and was completed by Child whilst having dinner with Tyler.

The song was recorded at Blackbird Studio, in Nashville, Tennessee. The lyrics depict Tyler telling a lover who does not believe in love or religion to just believe in her. "Believe in Me" was selected as the 2013 Eurovision Song Contest entry for the United Kingdom. To comply with the song duration rules, the album version was cut to three minutes and three seconds for radio play and for live performance. The photograph used for the cover art was taken by Tyler's nephew, Andrew Hopkins. Following the Eurovision Song Contest, the song peaked at No. 93 in the United Kingdom, but did not chart elsewhere.

"Believe in Me" received mixed reviews from music critics, and the song was largely blamed for Tyler's mediocre final score in the Eurovision Song Contest Grand Final. Despite the single's chart placing and result at Eurovision, both Tyler and the single won categories in the Eurovision Song Contest Radio Awards; the first time a UK representative has won in a category in the ESC Radio's history.

== Background and release ==
Tyler had been working on her sixteenth studio album Rocks and Honey since 2008. She recorded the album in the Blackbird Studios, Nashville, Tennessee, and released the album on 8 March 2013 in Europe, one day after Tyler was announced as the United Kingdom's representative at the Eurovision Song Contest. The official release of "Believe in Me" followed a week later, released on 13 March by Celtic Swan Recordings in the United Kingdom and Ireland, and 15 March in Europe. At her appearance on The One Show Tyler explained that the song had already been written before the BBC suggested it as the Eurovision entry when she sent a demo of Rocks and Honey to them. The song has also been added to the SingStar store as a karaoke track. A remix single of the song by Blutonium Boy & Matty Menk was released on 13 May by Celtic Swan Recordings.

The music video was published on the BBC's official YouTube channel on 6 March 2013. The video was shot in East Sussex in a beach hut and on a nearby beach. Alongside the music video film crew there was a second crew that filmed a 'making-of' video. The BBC published the film in late March.

== Composition ==
What other lovers do looks like a joke to you
It's a table for one 'cause you never make room for two, it's true
You come and you go and there's never no compromise, that's why
The seconds and the minutes of the days of your life go crawling by

— Lyrics from the second verse. The first two lines were cut for the radio and Eurovision versions.

Lauren Christy and Christopher Braide's involvement in composing "Believe in Me" is unknown, though when it was announced that the song would represent the United Kingdom in the Eurovision Song Contest 2013, Bonnie Tyler told The Telegraph that Child finished composing the song at dinner.

"When I got to Nashville, I was looking for songs around the publishers, and got in touch with Desmond and he said "come up for dinner tomorrow night and I'll give you some songs." He'd already recorded some of these demos, but I said "I really love these two songs." And he said "But "Believe in Me" isn't finished yet. I tell you what, come back up for dinner tomorrow night and I'll finish writing it then," which is what he did. I'll never forget that night, we got there and Bob Ezrin was there, the producer of The Wall for Pink Floyd. After dinner [Child] wrote the second verse."

— Bonnie Tyler interviewed on BBC Radio, May 2013.

Welsh singer Paul Child conducted an interview with Desmond Child in Nashville in April 2013 to discuss his work with Bonnie Tyler, both with "Believe in Me" and in the beginnings when he wrote her hit single "If You Were a Woman" in the 1980s. Paul Child drew similarities between the lyrical and rhythmic structure of "Believe in Me" and the Labelle song "Lady Marmalade", specifically with the lines "Voulez-vous coucher avec moi (ce soir)?" and "[...] and you laugh at the thought of putting your faith in stuff, like love". Desmond stated that they (Child, Christy and Braide) wanted to write a song that would "uplift the world, and we're so thrilled that Bonnie sang it and that it got chosen to represent the UK."

== Reception ==
=== Critical response ===
Professional ratings
Review scores
Source	Rating
UKMIX	4/5 stars
Daily Mirror	3/5 stars
Digital Spy	2/5 stars

Upon its initial release, the song received mixed reviews from music critics. UKMIX described the song as "quite blissful with a smooth vocal delivery and some pretty nice lyrics," but despite not being able to fault the song, the reviewer was unsure that the song was the right choice for the Eurovision Song Contest and predicted that Tyler would suffer the same criticism that Engelbert Humperdinck received the previous year. Robert Copsey from Digital Spy gave the song two stars out of five, stating that the song is a "polar opposite to the slew of Euro-club bangers entering this year's contest," but applauded Tyler for entering the Eurovision Song Contest with the contrasting song. The Guardian held a poll on their website asking the public if they expected Tyler to be successful at Eurovision. The results were fairly even with 46% predicting that Tyler would win and 54% voting that they didn't expect Tyler to win. Ann Gripper from the Daily Mirror described the song as "heartfelt," and went on to say that Tyler "can still sing." She criticised the songwriters' choice of "above" and "stuff" as the first rhyming lyrics, but noted the line "you never see the rainbow, you just curse the rain" as an improvement, and an opportunity to "have some fun with the staging on finals night in Malmo." Gripper concluded by saying that it "doesn't get into your head like (2012 Sweden winning song) "Euphoria"," and stated that unless the staging is "spectacular", the song won't be remembered by voting time.

=== Commercial performance ===
Commercially, the song reached minor success on record charts. On 19 May 2013, "Believe in Me" scored the highest Eurovision-related new entry on that week's Top 100 UK Singles Chart, despite finishing 19th in the contest. The song climbed up to No. 86 in the UK mid-week charts following its debut at No. 93, but dropped out of the Top 100 by the following week.

== Eurovision Song Contest 2013 ==
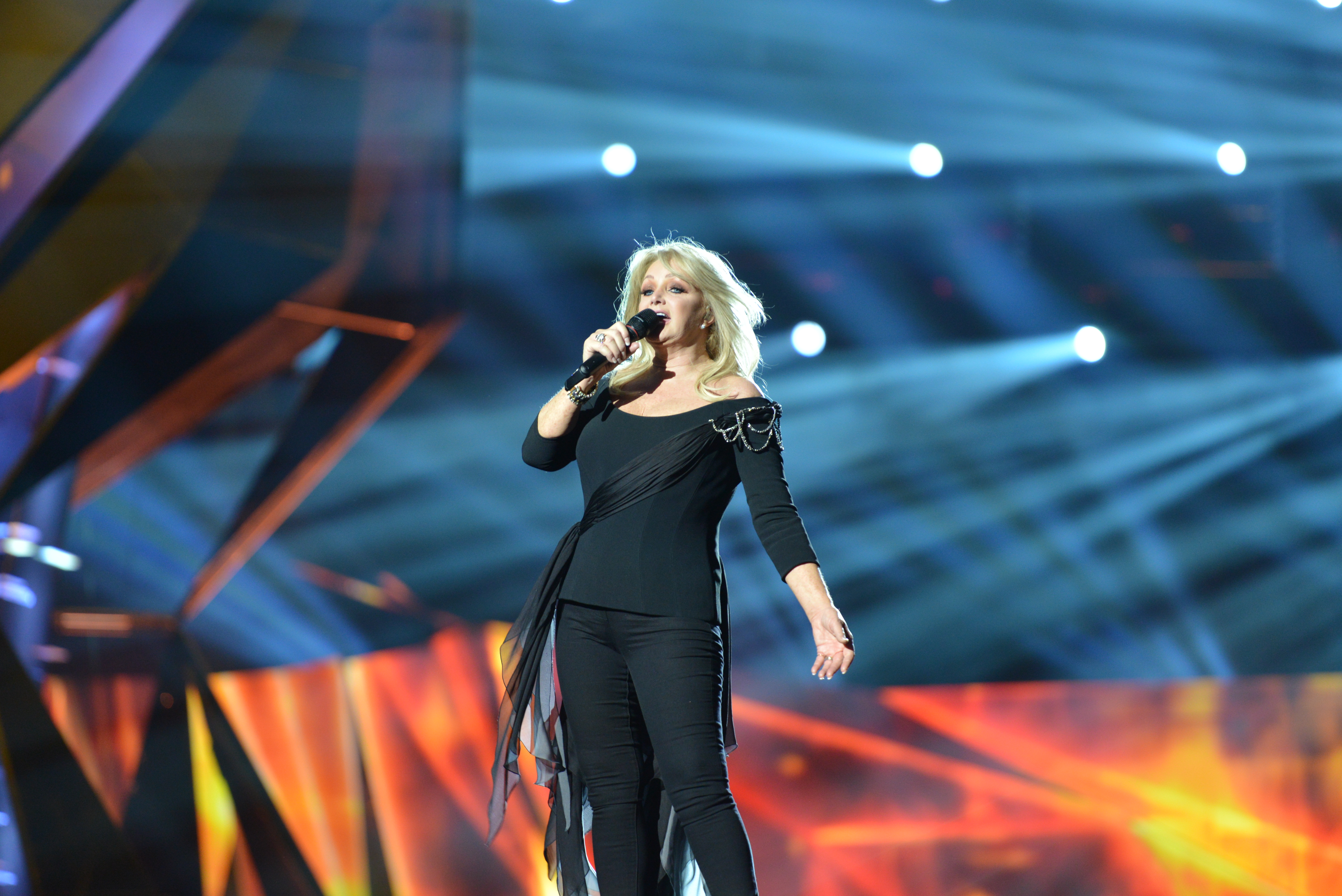
Bonnie Tyler at the Eurovision Song Contest 2013 second rehearsal, 15 May 2013 in Malmö, Sweden.

Tyler was selected by the BBC to represent the United Kingdom in the Eurovision Song Contest 2013. The first rehearsal took place on 12 May, the second on 15 May and the performance in front of the jury on 17 May 2013. Tyler's final performance of "Believe in Me" took place on 18 May during the Grand Final, with Anthony Goldsbrough (guitar and backing vocals), Michael Gazzard (guitar and backing vocals), Hayley Sanderson (guitar and backing vocals), Kristen Cummings (keyboards and backing vocals) and Grant Mugent-Kershaw (drums). The song was staged with Tyler standing by a microphone stand with her backing group before walking down the catwalk onto a rising platform.

The song finished in 19th place with points from Ireland (7), Malta (5), Spain (4), Romania (3), Switzerland (2), Sweden (1) and Slovenia (1), a total of 23 points.

=== Reaction to the Eurovision results ===
Several journalists and singers have made public their views on the song and the result. Irish entrant and three-time winner of Eurovision Johnny Logan complimented Tyler, but argued that the song wasn't strong enough. He continued, "If you're going to win Eurovision, to go through some of the incredible voting I've noticed over the last few years, you have to have something that's going to stand out above everything else. Otherwise you're just going to hope to pick up 10 or 11 votes." Similarly, Nathan Moore agreed that the song was not strong enough, but said "It was a great idea to get Bonnie involved, there's a lot of love for Bonnie out there." Mick Dalley (of Yahoo! News) agreed that "although Tyler herself was on form, singing beautifully and rousing the crowd with her podiumed finale, "Believe in Me" was simply not good enough as a song".

1997 UK winner Katrina Leskanich (of Katrina and the Waves) stated that she was underwhelmed by Denmark's entry, and expected Tyler to have scored higher than she did. British journalist Dave Goodman acknowledged that Tyler's entry was an improvement on the previous year, though argued that it was a combination of a poor position in the running order and the song that kept the UK from scoring higher.

During promotion for Rocks and Honey in France, Bonnie Tyler spoke out against the Eurovision Song Contest's incidents. After being asked if she believes the contest is rigged, she replied, "I think so."

"The next day after the Eurovision, the Russians were complaining to Azerbaijan, "why didn't you give us the ten points we paid for?" Excuse me! "We paid for?" Is this a competition? ... I don't care about that. We [United Kingdom] haven't won for sixteen years, and I didn't expect to win. It's too bad that politics come in to it, it should be a songwriting competition, not who lives next door to you."

— Bonnie Tyler interviewed by Le Parisien, May 2013.

The Daily Mail claimed that Tyler overheard the conversation of Russians complaining to Azerbaijanis and spread the rumour; Tyler challenged this and said that she had seen it on Sky News.

== Performances and promotion ==
Tyler first performed the song in Berlin, Germany where she featured as a guest on the Rock Meets Classic Tour in February to March 2013. Tyler was still involved with the tour when it was announced that she would be representing the United Kingdom in the Eurovision Song Contest in May, and after appearing on The One Show in London, she returned to Germany to begin promoting "Believe in Me". On 19 April, she stopped off at the Cologne Cathedral and the Madame Tussauds wax museum in Berlin for a photo shoot and unveiled wax figurines of the members of ABBA. On 28 April, the Leute Heute (German TV show) film team published a video from visiting Tyler's house a few weeks before to interview her on her participation in the Eurovision Song Contest. At mid-day, Tyler was interviewed and then performed an acoustic version of the song on BBC Radio 2's Weekend Wogan with her Eurovision group. Her final television appearance in the UK was on 3 May, when she performed "Believe in Me" on The Graham Norton Show.

After arriving in Malmö on 10 May, Tyler was received positively by the press and by the other Eurovision entrants. Particular support came from Finland's entrant Krista Siegfrids and Malta's entrant Gianluca Bezzina. Before the voting concluded, the UK received 2 more points from Switzerland and the Lithuanian spokesperson spoke "I love you, Bonnie Tyler" despite the UK not scoring any Lithuanian votes.

== Credits and personnel ==
Credits are adapted from the liner notes of the CD single.

- Bonnie Tyler - lead vocals
- David Huff – producer, percussion, programming, digital editing
- Chad Cromwell – drums
- Jimmy Lee Solas – bass guitar
- Ilya Toshinsky – acoustic guitar, mandolin, dobro, banjo
- Jerry McPherson – electric guitar
- Tom Bukavak – electric guitar
- Kenny Greenburg – electric guitar
- Mike Rojas – piano, B-3, synthesizer
- Larry Hall – strings
- Jodi Marr – backing vocals
- Justin Nie Bank – mixing

== Track listings and formats ==
Germany Maxi CD single

1. "Believe in Me" (Radio edit) – 3:01
2. "Believe in Me" (Album version) – 3:57
3. "Stubborn" – 3:46

UK Digital download

1. "Believe in Me" (Eurovision edit) – 3:01

== Charts ==
Chart (2013)	Peak position
Scottish Singles Sales (Official Charts)	83
UK Indie (Official Charts)	10
UK Radio Airplay Chart (Music Week)	18
UK Singles (Official Charts)	93
UK Singles Downloads (Official Charts)	98

== Release history ==
Region	Date	Format	Record label
United Kingdom	13 March 2013	Digital download	Celtic Swan Recordings
Germany	15 March 2013	Maxi single	ZYX Music

== Accolades ==
Eurovision Song Contest Radio Awards

Bonnie Tyler won Best Song (with 12.6% of the vote) and Best Female Singer (with 16.9% of the vote) at the Eurovision Song Contest Radio Awards, and became the first representative of the United Kingdom to receive an award from ESC Radio since its initiation in 2006.

Year	Nominated work	Award	Result
2013	"Believe in Me"	Best Song	Won
2013	Herself	Best Female Singer	Won
