= Yes I Can (song) =

2025 song by Bonnie Tyler

Single by Bonnie Tyler
- Released: 1 January 2025
- Studio: The Factory Sound, Woldingham, UK; LaLa Music, Landeck, Austria
- Genre: Pop
- Length: 3:35
- Songwriters: Bill DiLuigi; Hannah McNeil
- Producers: David Mackay; Patrick Schmiderer

Bonnie Tyler singles chronology
| "Older (Live in Berlin)" (2024) | "Yes I Can" (2025) | "Together" (2025) |

Music video
- "Yes I Can" on YouTube

"Yes I Can" is a song recorded by Welsh singer Bonnie Tyler. It was written by Bill DiLuigi and Hannah McNeil, and was produced by David Mackay and Patrick Schmiderer. It was released as a single on 1 January 2025.

== Background and release ==
In April 2023, Tyler stated that she planned to record more music, following the release of her latest album The Best Is Yet to Come (2021). In December 2024, Tyler revealed to schlagerpuls.de that she would premiere a new song live on a New Year's Eve television show in Germany. The event was later revealed to be Silvester-Schlagerbooom 2025. She told Abendzeitung that she plans to release a second single in time for her Just Live Tour in May 2025.

== Music and lyrics ==
Hannah McNeil began writing "Yes I Can" after meeting with an oncologist, who later died from cancer. Many of the song's lyrics are based on quotes and adaptations of things he shared with McNeil. She completed the song during a writing session with Bill DiLuigi in Spring Hill, Tennessee. David Mackay, who had previously worked with Tyler on her first two albums The World Starts Tonight (1977) and Natural Force (1978), as well as her later albums Between the Earth and the Stars (2019) and The Best Is Yet to Come (2021), produced the track alongside Patrick Schmiderer. Tyler noted that Mackay intends to transition Tyler's future work exclusively to Schmiderer.

== Critical reception ==
Classic Rock magazine described "Yes I Can" as a "sweet, hooky new single" with a "glossy 2025-era pop production". Classic Rock readers voted "Yes I Can" as the first Track of the Week for 2025. Nostalgie described the song as "generous and combative", noting its positive message.

== Commercial performance ==
After one day of release, "Yes I Can" entered the Swiss iTunes Chart at number 39.

== Personnel ==
Credits adapted from YouTube Music.

- Bonnie Tyler – vocals
- David Mackay – producer, recording engineer, synthesizer, additional percussion, background vocals
- Patrick Schmiderer – producer, recording engineer, mix engineer, synthesizer, Hammond organ, additional percussion
- Christian Kaufmann – guitar
- Bob Jenkins – drums
- Miriam Stockley – background vocals
- Rod Houison – vocal engineer for Miriam Stockley
