= The Ultimate Collection (Bonnie Tyler album) =

1995 greatest hits album by Bonnie Tyler

Greatest hits album by Bonnie Tyler
- Released: 1995
- Recorded: 1976–1994
- Label: BMG
- Producer: Dieter Bohlen; Desmond Child; Harold Faltermeyer; Uli Fischer; John Jansen; David Mackay; Hugh Murphy; Christopher Neil; Ronnie Scott; Jim Steinman; Luis Rodríguez; Steve Wolfe

Bonnie Tyler chronology
The Very Best of Bonnie Tyler Volume 2 (1994)	The Ultimate Collection (1995)	Free Spirit (1995)

The Ultimate Collection is a greatest hits album by Welsh singer Bonnie Tyler, released in 1995 by BMG. The album includes numerous singles from Tyler's RCA, CBS and Hansa eras, from her first hit record, "Lost in France" (1976), up to her then most recent single, "Say Goodbye" (1994). The album was released exclusively in Denmark, where it reached no. 2 on the Danish Albums Chart.

== Track listing ==
Disc one
No.	Title	Writer(s)	Producer(s)	Length
1.	"Total Eclipse of the Heart" (from Faster Than the Speed of Night, 1983)	Jim Steinman	John Jansen; Steinman	4:27
2.	"It's a Heartache" (from Natural Force, 1978)	Ronnie Scott; Steve Wolfe	David Mackay; Scott; Wolfe	3:30
3.	"A Rockin' Good Way (to Mess Around and Fall in Love)" (from The Bop Won't Stop, 1983)	Brook Benton; Clyde Otis; Luchi DeJesus	Christopher Neil	2:54
4.	"The Best" (from Hide Your Heart, 1988)	Holly Knight; Mike Chapman	Desmond Child	4:00
5.	"If You Were a Woman (And I Was a Man)" (from Secret Dreams and Forbidden Fire, 1986)	Child	Child	3:57
6.	"Loving You's a Dirty Job (But Somebody's Gotta Do It)" (from Secret Dreams and Forbidden Fire)	Steinman	Steinman	5:47
7.	"Save Up All Your Tears" (from Hide Your Heart)	Child; Diane Warren	Child	4:02
8.	"To Love Somebody" (from Hide Your Heart)	Barry Gibb; Robin Gibb	Child	5:30
9.	"Don't Turn Around" (from Hide Your Heart)	Albert Hammond; Warren	Child	4:16
10.	"More Than a Lover" (from The World Starts Tonight, 1977)	Scott; Wolfe	Mackay; Scott; Wolfe	4:12
11.	"Fools Lullaby" (from Angel Heart, 1992)	Howard Houston^{[a]}	Bohlen; Luis Rodríguez^{[b]}	3:52
12.	"From the Bottom of My Lonely Heart" (from Silhouette in Red, 1993)	Houston^{[a]}	Bohlen; Rodríguez^{[b]}	3:32
13.	"Band of Gold" (from Secret Dreams and Forbidden Fire)	Edith Wayne; Ron Dunbar	Child	5:49
14.	"Say Goodbye" (from Asterix Conquers America soundtrack, 1994)	David Cooke; Harold Faltermeyer; Magda Labonté	Faltermeyer; Uli Fischer	5:11
15.	"Fire in My Soul" (from Silhouette in Red)	Steve Benson^{[a]}	Bohlen; Rodríguez^{[b]}	4:35

Notes

- ^a signifies a pseudonym for Dieter Bohlen
- ^b signifies an additional producer

== Charts ==
Chart (1995)	Peak position
Danish Albums (Hitlisten)	2
