= The Best (Bonnie Tyler album) =

- UK cover

Compilation album by Bonnie Tyler
- Released: 15 March 1993
- Recorded: 1976–1993
- Genre: Pop rock
- Length: 74:48 (UK edition)
- Label: Columbia; Versailles

Bonnie Tyler chronology
The Very Best of Bonnie Tyler (1993)	The Best (1993)	Silhouette in Red (1993)

Alternative cover
- 1998 French cover

Professional ratings
Review scores
Source	Rating
Allmusic	3/5 stars

Bonnie Tyler: The Best is a compilation album by Welsh singer Bonnie Tyler. It was released in 1993 by Columbia in the UK and by Versailles Records in France. Both issues feature the same front cover, but they do not have matching track lists. In 1995, the album was reissued in the UK under the title The Definitive Collection, featuring the original track listing and a bonus CD with five more tracks.

== Track listing ==
=== UK Version ===
1. "Total Eclipse of the Heart" (Jim Steinman) – 4:27
  (from the 1983 album Faster Than the Speed of Night)
2. "Faster Than the Speed of Night" (Steinman) – 4:40
  (from the 1983 album Faster Than the Speed of Night)
3. "Have You Ever Seen the Rain?" (John Fogerty) – 4:03
  (from the 1983 album Faster Than the Speed of Night)
4. "If You Were a Woman (And I Was a Man)" (Desmond Child) – 3:57
  (from the 1986 album Secret Dreams and Forbidden Fire)
5. "Here She Comes" (Pete Bellotte, Giorgio Moroder) – 3:21
  (from the 1984 soundtrack for Metropolis)
6. "Loving You's a Dirty Job but Somebody's Gotta Do It" (Steinman) – 5:47
  (from the 1986 album Secret Dreams and Forbidden Fire)
7. "Getting So Excited" (Alan Gruner) – 3:38
  (from the 1983 album Faster Than the Speed of Night)
8. "Save Up All Your Tears" (Child, Diane Warren) – 4:02
  (from the 1988 album Hide Your Heart)
9. "The Best" (Mike Chapman, Holly Knight) – 4:00
  (from the 1988 album Hide Your Heart)
10. "Holding Out for a Hero" (Steinman, Dean Pitchford) – 4:28
  (from the 1984 album Footloose and the 1986 album Secret Dreams and Forbidden Fire)
11. "(The World Is Full of) Married Men" (Dominic Bugatti, Frank Musker) – 3:57
  (1979 single only)
12. "A Rockin' Good Way (To Mess Around and Fall in Love)" (with Shakin' Stevens) (Brook Benton, Luchi de Jesus, Clyde Otis) – 2:54
  (from the 1983 Shakin' Stevens album The Bop Won't Stop)
13. "More Than a Lover" (Ronnie Scott, Steve Wolfe) – 4:08
  (from the 1977 album The World Starts Tonight)
14. "Don't Turn Around" (Warren, Albert Hammond) – 4:16
  (from the 1988 album Hide Your Heart)
15. "Lovers Again" (Child) – 4:13
  (from the 1986 album Secret Dreams and Forbidden Fire)
16. "Lost in France" (Scott, Wolfe) – 3:57
  (from the 1977 album The World Starts Tonight)
17. "It's a Heartache" (Scott, Wolfe) – 3:30
  (from the 1978 album Natural Force)
18. "To Love Somebody (Barry Gibb, Robin Gibb, Maurice Gibb) – 5:30
  (from the 1988 album Hide Your Heart)

=== France Version ===
Writer is same as English version for any occurrence of the same song.

1. "Total Eclipse Of The Heart"
2. "Holding Out For A Hero" (Club Mix)
3. "It's A Heartache"
4. "If You Were A Woman (And I Was A Man)"
5. "Here She Comes"
6. "Loving You Is A Dirty Job But Somebody's Got To Do It"
7. "Lost In France"
8. "Rockin' Good Way (To Mess Around And Fall In Love)"
9. "Have You Ever Seen The Rain?"
10. "Straight From The Heart" (Bryan Adams/Eric Kanga)
  (from the 1983 album Faster Than the Speed of Night)
11. "Faster Than The Speed Of Night"
12. "(You Make Me Feel Like) A Natural Woman" (Gerry Goffin/Carole King/Jerry Wexler)
  (from the 1978 album It's a Heartache)
13. "A Whiter Shade Of Pale" (Gary Brooker/Keith Reid)
  (from the 1981 album Goodbye to the Island)
14. "The Best"
15. "Hide Your Heart" (Paul Stanley/Child/Knight)
  (from the 1988 album Hide Your Heart)
16. "Don't Turn Around"
17. "Band Of Gold" (Extended Version) (Edyth Wayne / Ronald Dunbar)
  (original version from the 1986 album Secret Dreams and Forbidden Fire)

== Charts ==
Chart (1993)	Peak position
French Albums	4
Chart (1995)	Peak position
French Albums	4
Chart (1996)	Peak position
UK Albums (OCC)	93
Chart (1998)	Peak position
French Albums	12
Chart (1999)	Peak position
French Albums	16

== Certifications ==
Region	Certification	Certified units/sales
France (SNEP)	Platinum	300,000^{*}
United Kingdom (BPI)	Silver	60,000^{*}
^{*} Sales figures based on certification alone.
