= The Greatest Hits (Bonnie Tyler album) =

Compilation album by Bonnie Tyler
- Released: 17 November 1986
- Recorded: 1976–1986
- Genre: Pop rock
- Label: Telstar Records

Bonnie Tyler chronology
Secret Dreams and Forbidden Fire (1986)	The Greatest Hits (1986)	Hide Your Heart (1988)

The Greatest Hits is a 1986 compilation album by Bonnie Tyler. Released by Telstar Records, it was later released by Sony International in 1991.

== Track listing ==
Side one
No.	Title	Writer(s)	Parent album	Length
1.	"Total Eclipse of the Heart"	Jim Steinman	Faster Than the Speed of Night, 1983	4:30
2.	"Holding Out for a Hero"	Steinman, Dean Pitchford	Secret Dreams and Forbidden Fire, 1986	4:23
3.	"(The World Is Full of) Married Men"	Dominic Bugatti, Frank Musker	The World Is Full Of Married Men (Hits From The Film Soundtrack), 1979	3:47
4.	"A Rockin' Good Way (to Mess Around and Fall in Love)" (Duet with Shakin' Stevens)	Brook Benton, Luchi de Jesus, Clyde Otis	The Bop Won't Stop, 1983 Shakin' Stevens album	2:52
5.	"Here She Comes"	Pete Bellotte, Giorgio Moroder	Metropolis (Original Motion Picture Soundtrack), 1984	3:22
6.	"Band of Gold"	Edyth Wayne, Ronald Dunbar	Secret Dreams and Forbidden Fire, 1986	3:47
7.	"Faster Than the Speed of Night"	Steinman	Faster Than the Speed of Night, 1983	4:40
8.	"Lovers Again"	Desmond Child	Secret Dreams and Forbidden Fire, 1986	4:14

Side two
No.	Title	Writer(s)	Parent album	Length
9.	"Lost in France"	Ronnie Scott, Steve Wolfe	The World Starts Tonight, 1977	3:53
10.	"It's a Heartache"	Scott, Wolfe	Natural Force, 1978	3:29
11.	"Getting So Excited"	Alan Gruner	Faster Than the Speed of Night, 1983	3:29
12.	"Have You Ever Seen the Rain?"	John Fogerty	Faster Than the Speed of Night, 1983	4:05
13.	"I Believe in Your Sweet Love"	Scott, Wolfe	Goodbye to the Island, 1981	3:42
14.	"If I Sing You a Love Song"	Scott, Wolfe	Natural Force, 1978	4:46
15.	"More Than a Lover"	Scott, Wolfe	The World Starts Tonight, 1977	4:12
16.	"Straight From the Heart"	Bryan Adams, Eric Kagna	Faster Than the Speed of Night, 1983	3:40

== Charts ==
Chart (1986/87)	Peak position
Australian Albums (ARIA)	48
Eurocharts European Top 100 Albums	68
Dutch Albums (Album Top 100)	9
Norwegian Albums (VG-lista)	11
UK Albums (OCC)	24

Chart (1989)	Peak position
Finland The Official Finnish Charts	9

== Certifications ==
Region	Certification	Certified units/sales
Austria (IFPI Austria)	Gold	25,000^{*}
Finland (Musiikkituottajat)	Gold	31,918
Netherlands (NVPI)	Gold	75,000^{^}
Switzerland (IFPI Switzerland)	Gold	25,000^{^}
^{*} Sales figures based on certification alone.^{^} Shipments figures based on certification alone.
