= Total Eclipse Anthology =

Compilation album by Bonnie Tyler
- Released: 21 January 2002
- Genre: Pop rock
- Label: Sanctuary

Bonnie Tyler chronology
Greatest Hits (2001)	Total Eclipse Anthology (2002)	Heart Strings (2003)

Total Eclipse Anthology is a compilation album by Welsh singer Bonnie Tyler released in January 2002 by Sanctuary Records. The two-disc collection features songs from all of Tyler's previous record labels including RCA, CBS, Hansa and EastWest.

Two years after the Total Eclipse Anthology was released, following the success of Tyler's single "Si demain.. (Turn Around)" with Kareen Antonn, the compilation entered the French Compilation Chart and the Mid-Price Albums charts, peaking at no. 36 and no. 25 respectively.

== Background ==
The Total Eclipse Anthology was compiled and annotated by Gerald Armin, who also wrote the liner notes for Tyler's other compilations Greatest Hits (2001) and Lost in France: The Early Years (2005). It features Tyler's debut single "My! My! Honeycomb" which had not previously appeared on any album since its standalone release in 1976. The compilation features a slipcase cover art with a photograph of Tyler taken by David Hurn in October 2001. The cover art for the CD booklet features an image taken for Tyler's album Secret Dreams and Forbidden Fire in 1986.

== Critical reception ==
Professional ratings
Review scores
Source	Rating
AllMusic	4/5 stars

James Christopher Monger of AllMusic gave the compilation four out of five stars, describing the Total Eclipse Anthology as suitable for listeners who are "looking to dig deeper into Tyler's career".

== Track listing ==
Disc One
No.	Title	Writer(s)	Producer	Length
1.	"My! My! Honeycomb"	James Luck; John Szego	Ronnie Scott; David Mackay	3:08
2.	"Lost in France"	Scott; Steve Wolfe	Mackay; Scott; Wolfe	3:55
3.	"Baby, I Remember You"	Scott; Wolfe	Mackay; Scott; Wolfe	3:16
4.	"The World Starts Tonight"	Scott; Wolfe	Mackay; Scott; Wolfe	3:33
5.	"Here's Monday"	Scott; Wolfe	Mackay; Scott; Wolfe	3:45
6.	"More Than a Lover"	Scott; Wolfe	Mackay; Scott; Wolfe	4:14
7.	"It's a Heartache"	Scott; Wolfe	Mackay; Scott; Wolfe	3:31
8.	"Hey Love (It's a Feelin')"	Scott; Wolfe	Mackay; Scott; Wolfe	3:58
9.	"Blame Me"	Scott; Wolfe	Mackay; Scott; Wolfe	4:02
10.	"Here Am I"	Scott; Wolfe	Mackay; Scott; Wolfe	3:51
11.	"If You Ever Need Me Again"	Scott; Wolfe	Robin Geoffrey Cable; Scott; Wolfe	3:33
12.	"My Guns Are Loaded"	Scott; Wolfe	Cable; Scott; Wolfe	3:01
13.	"Goodbye to the Island"	Scott; Wolfe	Hugh Murphy; Scott; Wolfe	3:11
14.	"We Danced on the Ceiling"	Scott; Wolfe	Murphy; Scott; Wolfe	4:54
15.	"Sitting on the Edge of the Ocean"	Scott; Wolfe	Murphy; Scott; Wolfe	3:19
16.	"(The World Is Full of) Married Men"	Dominic Bugatti; Frank Musker	Scott; Wolfe	4:01
17.	"Hide Your Heart"	Paul Stanley; Desmond Child; Holly Knight	Child	4:26
18.	"Notes from America"	Child; Robbie Seidman	Child	4:57
19.	"Ravishing"	Jim Steinman	Steinman	6:26
20.	"Streets of Little Italy"	Seidman	Child	4:40

Disc Two
No.	Title	Writer(s)	Producer	Length
1.	"Total Eclipse of the Heart"	Jim Steinman	Steinman	4:31
2.	"Faster Than the Speed of Night"	Steinman	Steinman	6:43
3.	"Have You Ever Seen the Rain?"	John Fogerty	Steinman	4:09
4.	"Loving You's a Dirty Job (But Somebody's Gotta Do It)" (with Todd Rundgren)	Steinman	Steinman	7:49
5.	"Holding Out for a Hero"	Steinman; Dean Pitchford	Steinman	5:51
6.	"Bitterblue"	Dieter Bohlen	Bohlen	3:50
7.	"You Won't See Me Cry"	Lee Morris; Paul Hopkins	Morris; Hopkins; Taff Williams	2:49
8.	"Angel Heart"	Bohlen	Bohlen	3:49
9.	"Save Your Love" (with Frankie Miller)	Jerry Lynn Williams	David Madiran	5:15
10.	"Silhouette in Red"	Bohlen	Bohlen	4:00
11.	"Stay"	Bohlen	Bohlen	4:04
12.	"I Can't Leave Your Love Alone"	Alan Darby; David Madiran	Darby; Madiran	4:44
13.	"Whenever You Need Me"	David Yorath; Bonnie Tyler; Madiran	Yorath	4:04
14.	"Limelight"	Alan Parsons; Eric Woolfson	Stephan Power	4:08
15.	"Islands" (with Mike Oldfield)	Mike Oldfield	Oldfield; Tom Newman; Alan Shacklock	4:17
16.	"Sem Limites pra Sonhar (Reaching for the Infinite Heart)" (English Version, with Fábio Jr.)	Mariano Pérez; Carlos Gomez; Rosa Girón; Cláudio Rabello; Jeremy Brock	Oscar Gomez	4:16
17.	"Say Goodbye"	Harold Faltermeyer; David Cooke; Magda La Bonté	Faltermeyer; Uli Fisher	3:24

== Charts ==
Chart (2004)	Peak position
French Compilation Albums	36
French Mid-Price Albums	25

== Personnel ==
Credits adapted from liner notes.

- Gerald Armin – liner notes, compilation of tracks
- Steve Hammonds – project coordination
- Hugh Gilmour – art direction
- Albert de Gouviea – slipcase photo retouching
- Alwyn Clayden – inner package design
