= The Very Best of Bonnie Tyler (1993 album) =

Compilation album by Bonnie Tyler
- Released: 19 January 1993
- Recorded: 1976–1993
- Genre: Pop rock
- Length: 76:49
- Label: Columbia

Bonnie Tyler chronology
Bitterblue (1991)	The Very Best of Bonnie Tyler (1993)	The Best (1993)

The Very Best of Bonnie Tyler is a compilation album by Welsh singer Bonnie Tyler, released on 19 January 1993 by Columbia Records.

The Very Best of Bonnie Tyler peaked at no. 3 in Germany, where it became one of the best-selling albums of the year. It was nominated for Best CD of 1993 in the Female Singers' category at the Bravo Otto Awards, coming in 8th place. Due to its commercial success in Europe, Columbia released a second volume in 1994.

== Background and release ==
Tyler signed to CBS/Columbia in 1982 and released three albums: Faster Than the Speed of Night (1983), Secret Dreams and Forbidden Fire (1986) and Hide Your Heart (1988). The latter album featured recordings of "The Best", "Save Up All Your Tears" and "Don't Turn Around", and each had become hits for other artists by 1993. In her autobiography, Tyler expressed her frustration over the release of The Very Best of Bonnie Tyler, describing it as an attempt by Columbia to capitalise on the popularity of those songs. She also felt the compilation "overshadowed" her then-current studio album, Angel Heart, which had been released two months earlier.

The Very Best of Bonnie Tyler was released on 19 January 1993. It features selections from Tyler's RCA and CBS/Columbia albums, and some tracks from her first Hansa album, Bitterblue (1991). "I Can't Leave Your Love Alone" was marketed as a previously unreleased track, though it did feature as a B-Side from Tyler's 1992 single "Where Were You".

== Critical reception ==
Professional ratings
Review scores
Source	Rating
AllMusic	4/5 stars

In a review for AllMusic, Tomas Mureika described The Very Best of Bonnie Tyler as "The closest thing there is to a career retrospective so far", and an "excellent choice" for record buyers seeking an overview of her early career.

== Track listing ==
The Very Best of Bonnie Tyler
No.	Title	Writer(s)	Length
1.	"Lost in France"	Ronnie Scott; Steve Wolfe	3:55
2.	"It's a Heartache"	Scott; Wolfe	3:29
3.	"Here Am I"	Scott; Wolfe	3:49
4.	"Total Eclipse of the Heart"	Jim Steinman	6:57
5.	"Straight from the Heart"	Bryan Adams; Eric Kanga	3:41
6.	"A Rockin' Good Way (to Mess Around and Fall in Love)" (with Shakin' Stevens)	Brook Benton; Clyde Otis; Luchi de Jesus	2:53
7.	"Holding Out for a Hero"	Steinman; Dean Pitchford	5:49
8.	"Loving You's a Dirty Job (but Somebody's Gotta Do It)" (with Todd Rundgren)	Steinman	7:48
9.	"If You Were a Woman (And I Was a Man)"	Desmond Child	5:14
10.	"Islands" (with Mike Oldfield)	Mike Oldfield	4:18
11.	"Hide Your Heart"	Paul Stanley; Child; Holly Knight	4:21
12.	"Save Up All Your Tears"	Child; Diane Warren	4:20
13.	"Bitterblue"	Dieter Bohlen	3:47
14.	"Against the Wind"	Bohlen	3:37
15.	"Where Were You"	Albert Hammond	4:54
16.	"Till the End of Time" (with Dan Hartman)	Giorgio Moroder; Tom Whitlock	3:49
17.	"I Can't Leave Your Love Alone"	Alan Darby; David Madiran	4:01

== Charts ==
Chart (1993)	Peak position
Austrian Albums (Ö3 Austria)	17
European Top 100 Albums (Music & Media)	12
German Albums (Offizielle Top 100)	3
Swiss Albums (Schweizer Hitparade)	6

=== Year-end charts ===
Euro Year End Charts (1993)	Peak position
European Top 100 Albums (Music & Media)	44
German Albums (Offizielle Top 100)	11

== Industry awards ==
The Bravo Otto is a German accolade honoring excellence of performers in film, television and music. The awards are presented annually and voted by readers of Bravo magazine. The Very Best of Bonnie Tyler was nominated for Best CD of 1993 in the Female Singers' category, and came in 8th with 2.21% of the vote. Tyler's then-current studio album, Silhouette in Red, came in 9th place.

Awards and nominations for The Very Best of Bonnie Tyler
Organization	Year	Award	Result	Ref.
Bravo Otto Awards	1993	Best CD of 1993 (Female Singer)	8th place	

== Certifications ==
Region	Certification	Certified units/sales
Germany (BVMI)	Platinum	500,000^{^}
^{^} Shipments figures based on certification alone.

== Bibliography ==
- Tyler, Bonnie (2023). Straight from the Heart. Hodder & Stoughton. ISBN 978-1-39972-625-2.
