= Greatest Hits (Bonnie Tyler album) =

Compilation album by Bonnie Tyler
- Released: 2001
- Genre: Rock
- Length: 75:06
- Labels: Sanctuary Records, Sony

Bonnie Tyler chronology
| All in One Voice (1999) | Greatest Hits (2001) | Total Eclipse Anthology (2002) |

Professional ratings
Review scores
| Source | Rating |
|---|---|
| Allmusic | 3.5/5 stars |

Greatest Hits is a compilation album by Welsh singer Bonnie Tyler. It was released in 2001 by Sanctuary Records. The album features Tyler's major career hits and one of her latest recordings from the time, "Tyre Tracks and Broken Hearts".

Greatest Hits became a substantial hit in several European countries, and was certified Platinum by the IFPI Norway. It received a positive review from AllMusic and is among Tyler's best-selling compilation albums.

== Background ==
Tyler had a photoshoot directed by Paul Cox, who was photographer for her 1995 album Free Spirit.

"That was the last shot of the day. The record company wanted a picture of me lying on the floor with my hair all over the place. I don't think the photographer thought it was a very good idea, or myself, until the last roll of the day. We did this shot, and I laid on the floor on top of this satin sheet, and then he got on a ladder and just took the pictures... ...Ends up on the front cover."

— Bonnie Tyler interviewed by Jonathan Ross

The album includes one of Tyler's latest recordings from the time of release, "Tyre Tracks and Broken Hearts". The song was written by Jim Steinman and Andrew Lloyd Webber and originally recorded for the concept album for the 1996 musical Whistle Down the Wind. Tyler performed the song live at Webber's 50th birthday celebration at the Royal Albert Hall in London, 1998.

== Critical reception ==
Greatest Hits was given three and a half stars out of five from AllMusic. They stated that, "As long as it has "Total Eclipse of the Heart", "It's a Heartache", "Faster Than the Speed of Night" and "Holding Out for a Hero" on it, any Bonnie Tyler compilation is going to earn a few stars, and this collection from Sanctuary is no exception."

== Track listings ==
| No. | Title | Writer(s) | Length |
|---|---|---|---|
| 1. | "Total Eclipse of the Heart" | Jim Steinman | 4:25 |
| 2. | "It's a Heartache" | Ronnie Scott, Steve Wolfe | 3:30 |
| 3. | "Holding Out for a Hero" | Steinman | 5:50 |
| 4. | "Lost in France" | Scott, Wolfe | 3:50 |
| 5. | "Faster Than the Speed of Night" | Steinman | 6:45 |
| 6. | "(The World Is Full of) Married Men" | Dominic Bugatti, Frank Muske | 4:00 |
| 7. | "Have You Ever Seen the Rain?" | John Fogerty | 4:10 |
| 8. | "More Than a Lover" | Scott, Wolfe | 4:16 |
| 9. | "A Rockin' Good Way (to Mess Around and Fall in Love)" | Brook Benton, Clyde Otis, Luchi de Jesus | 2:53 |
| 10. | "Goodbye to the Island" | Scott, Wolfe | 3:47 |
| 11. | "Loving You's a Dirty Job (But Somebody's Gotta Do It)" | Steinman | 7:47 |
| 12. | "Straight from the Heart" | Bryan Adams | 3:35 |
| 13. | "Bitterblue" | Dieter Bohlen | 3:50 |
| 14. | "Piece of My Heart" | Jerry Ragovoy, Bert Berns | 3:59 |
| 15. | "Making Love (Out of Nothing at All)" | Steinman | 7:52 |
| 16. | "My Guns Are Loaded" | Scott, Wolfe | 3:47 |
| 17. | "Tyre Tracks and Broken Hearts" | Steinman, Andrew Lloyd Webber | 5:20 |
| Total length: | | | 75:06 |

== Charts ==
=== Weekly charts ===
| Chart (2001) | Peak position |
|---|---|
| Danish Albums (Hitlisten) | 5 |
| Eurocharts (European Top 100 Albums) | 83 |
| Finnish Albums (Suomen virallinen lista) | 6 |
| Norwegian Albums (VG-lista) | 2 |
| Swedish Albums (Sverigetopplistan) | 9 |
| UK Albums (Official Charts) | 18 |

=== Year-end charts ===
| Chart (2001) | Position |
|---|---|
| Swedish Albums (Sverigetopplistan) | 67 |

== Certifications ==
| Region | Certification | Certified units/sales |
|---|---|---|
| Denmark (IFPI Danmark) | Platinum | 20,000^{‡} |
| Finland (Musiikkituottajat) | Gold | 17,605 |
| France (SNEP) | Gold | 100,000^{*} |
| Norway (IFPI Norway) | Platinum | 50,000^{*} |
| Spain (Promusicae) | Gold | 50,000^{^} |
| Sweden (GLF) | Gold | 40,000^{^} |
| United Kingdom (BPI) | Silver | 60,000^{^} |
^{*} Sales figures based on certification alone.^{^} Shipments figures based on certification alone.^{‡} Sales+streaming figures based on certification alone.

== Personnel ==
- Management – David Aspden
- Mastering – Andy Pearce
