= The Very Best of Bonnie Tyler Volume 2 =

Compilation album by Bonnie Tyler
- Released: 14 February 1994
- Recorded: 1976–1993
- Genre: Pop rock
- Length: 65:31
- Label: Columbia

Bonnie Tyler chronology
Silhouette in Red (1993)	The Very Best of Bonnie Tyler; Volume 2 (1994)	The Ultimate Collection (1995)

The Very Best of Bonnie Tyler Volume 2 is a compilation album by Welsh singer Bonnie Tyler. It was released on 14 February 1994 by Columbia Records as a follow-up to The Very Best of Bonnie Tyler, released in the previous year.

== Content ==
Released in 1994, this is the follow-up to the successful 1993 edition. This album covers more of Tyler's recent work compared with the previous collection, including a 1984 single released for the Metropolis soundtrack entitled "Here She Comes". Other singles include "The Best" (which became an eventual Tina Turner hit) and "Faster Than the Speed of Night". Six tracks come from her pre-Steinman work, including the spectacular "A Natural Woman".

== Track listing ==
The Very Best of Bonnie Tyler Volume 2
No.	Title	Writer(s)	Length
1.	"Notes from America"	Desmond Child; Robbie Seidman	4:54
2.	"Have You Ever Seen the Rain?"	John Fogerty	4:05
3.	"The Best"	Mike Chapman; Holly Knight	4:15
4.	"To Love Somebody"	Barry Gibb; Robin Gibb	5:47
5.	"(You Make Me Feel Like a) Natural Woman"	Gerry Goffin; Carole King; Jerry Wexler	3:06
6.	"Don't Turn Around"	Albert Hammond; Diane Warren	4:18
7.	"My Guns Are Loaded"	Scott; Wolfe	3:01
8.	"Wild Side of Life"	Arlie Carter; William Warren	3:49
9.	"Here She Comes"	Giorgio Moroder; Pete Bellotte	3:22
10.	"No Way to Treat a Lady"	Bryan Adams; Jim Vallance	5:17
11.	"Faster Than the Speed of Night"	Jim Steinman	4:40
12.	"Lovers Again"	Child	4:14
13.	"More Than a Lover"	Scott; Wolfe	4:09
14.	"A Whiter Shade of Pale"	Gary Brooker; Keith Reid	4:28
15.	"Piece of My Heart"	Jerry Ragovoy; Bert Berns	3:01

== Charts ==
Chart (1994)	Peak position
Austrian Albums (Ö3 Austria)	38
European Top 100 Albums (Music & Media)	95
German Albums (Offizielle Top 100)	39
Swiss Albums (Schweizer Hitparade)	22
