= Heaven (1977 Bonnie Tyler song) =

Single by Bonnie Tyler

from the album Natural Force
- B-side: "Here's Monday"
- Released: July 1977
- Genre: Country
- Length: 3:04
- Songwriter(s): Ronnie Scott; Steve Wolfe
- Producer(s): David Mackay; Ronnie Scott; Steve Wolfe

Bonnie Tyler singles chronology
"More Than a Lover" (1977)	"Heaven" (1977)	"It's a Heartache" (1977)

"Heaven" is a song performed by Welsh singer Bonnie Tyler. The song was written by Ronnie Scott and Steve Wolfe, who produced the song with David Mackay. It was released in July 1977 by RCA Records, as the lead single from Tyler's second studio album Natural Force (1978). The lyrics depict Tyler realising that her relationship with her partner is breaking down.

The song did not repeat the success of Tyler's previous single "Lost in France" and only charted in Germany (where was a hit and spent 22 weeks on the charts) and Australia.

Tyler released another single entitled "Heaven" from her twelfth studio album All in One Voice (1998).

== Critical reception ==
Record Mirror gave the song a negative review, saying "[Tyler] takes it a bit slow this time and creates less impact than the previous two big hits."

== Charts ==
Chart (1977)	Peak position
Australia (Kent Music Report)	96
Germany (GfK Entertainment)	24
