= Hide Your Heart =

Hide Your Heart may refer to:

- Hide Your Heart (album), a 1988 album by Bonnie Tyler
  - "Hide Your Heart" (song), a titular song by Bonnie Tyler from the above album
- Hide Your Heart Tour, a 1988 concert tour by Bonnie Tyler
