= I Believe in Your Sweet Love =

Single by Bonnie Tyler

from the album Goodbye to the Island
- B-side: "Sitting On the Edge of the Ocean"
- Released: November 1979
- Genre: Pop rock
- Length: 3:36
- Label: RCA
- Songwriters: Ronnie Scott; Steve Wolfe
- Producers: Hugh Murphy; Ronnie Scott; Steve Wolfe

Bonnie Tyler singles chronology
"(The World Is Full of) Married Men" (1979)	"I Believe in Your Sweet Love" (1979)	"Sitting on the Edge of the Ocean" (1979)

"I Believe in Your Sweet Love" is a song recorded by Welsh singer Bonnie Tyler. It was released as a standalone single in November 1979, and Tyler later re-recorded it for her fourth studio album, Goodbye to the Island (1981). The song was written by Ronnie Scott and Steve Wolfe, who co-produced the track with Hugh Murphy.

The song was a hit in Canada, where it reached number 27 on the RPM Adult Contemporary chart. Record Mirror nominated it as a single of the week upon its release.

== Background ==
Tyler's success was in decline (except in Scandinavian countries) after she failed to match the success of her 1978 single "It's a Heartache" with subsequent releases. Diamond Cut (1979) only reached number 145 in the United States, and its most successful singles "Too Good to Last" and "My Guns Are Loaded" only saw regional success in mainland Europe and Canada.

Tyler released two singles in late 1979: "Sitting on the Edge of the Ocean", which saw her win the World Popular Song Festival in Japan; and "I Believe in Your Sweet Love".

"I Believe in Your Sweet Love" was also released on Tyler's album Lost in France: The Early Years (2005).

== Music video ==
The video was filmed in Beaulieu Palace House in Brockenhurst, United Kingdom.

== Charts ==
Chart (1979–80)	Peak position
Canada AC (RPM)	27
US (Record World)	138
