= It's a Jungle Out There =

It's a Jungle Out There may refer to:

- It's a Jungle Out There (collection), a 1997 collection by the British fashion designer Alexander McQueen
- "It's a Jungle Out There" (song), a 2003 song by Randy Newman, theme song for the TV series Monk
- "It's a Jungle Out There", a song by Three Dog Night on their 1983 album It's a Jungle
- It's a Jungle Out There!, an album by the Christian rock band Mastedon
- It's a Jungle Out There, an alternate English-language title for the 1995 German film After Five in the Forest Primeval
- "It's a Jungle Out There", a 1988 song by Bros from Push
