= Here Am I (Bonnie Tyler song) =

Single by Bonnie Tyler

from the album Natural Force
- B-side: "Don't Stop the Music"
- Released: 7 April 1978
- Genre: Country rock
- Length: 3:47
- Songwriter(s): Ronnie Scott & Steve Wolfe
- Producer(s): David Mackay

Bonnie Tyler singles chronology
"It's a Heartache" (1977)	"Here Am I" (1978)	"Hey Love (It's a Feelin')" (1978)

"Here Am I" is a song by Welsh singer Bonnie Tyler, released as a single from her 1978 album Natural Force by RCA Records. It was written by Tyler's at-the-time managers Ronnie Scott and Steve Wolfe. The B-side was "Don't Stop the Music", a song that was never released on any Tyler studio album.

"Here Am I" was not a chart success in the UK, but peaked at number 18 in the singles charts in Germany, and was in the best-sellers lists for two months. After two weeks in the Norwegian top ten, the single rose to number 4 in the third week. In the same week, her previous single "It's a Heartache" was one spot above "Here Am I" in the Norwegian singles chart.

== Background and release ==
Tyler had begun working on her second studio album in 1977 at "The Factory" in Surrey, London with the aim of a release the following year. She had been given a new live backing band who went by the name of "The Bonnie Tyler Band"; Kevin Dunne on bass, Neil Adams on drums, Steve Laurie on keyboards, and Gary Hayman on guitars. Tyler flew with her new group to the United States in early April 1978 to promote "It's a Heartache", which had just been released there. At the same time, "Here Am I" was released in Europe.

== Critical reception ==
Tim Lott from Record Mirror stated that "[the song is] blessed with her smokey vocals," but said that the song lacked the "irresistible hook of "It's a Heartache"."

== Chart performance ==
Chart (1978)	Peak position
Australia (Kent Music Report)	99
Finland The Official Finnish Charts	8
Germany GfK Entertainment Charts	18
Norway (VG-lista)	4
