= Sem Limites pra Sonhar (Reaching for the Infinite Heart) =

1986 single by Fábio Jr. and Bonnie Tyler

Single by Fábio Jr. and Bonnie Tyler

from the album Sem Limites pra Sonhar
- Released: 1986
- Label: CBS
- Songwriters: Mariano Pérez; Carlos Gomez; Rosa Girón; Cláudio Rabello
- Producer: Óscar Gómez

Bonnie Tyler singles chronology
| "Rebel Without a Clue" (1986) | "Sem Limites pra Sonhar (Reaching for the Infinite Heart)" (1986) | "Lovers Again" (1987) |

"Sem Limites pra Sonhar (Reaching for the Infinite Heart)" is a song recorded by Brazilian singer Fábio Jr. and Welsh singer Bonnie Tyler, released in 1986 on Junior's album Sem Límites pra Sonhar.

In 1988, Fabio Jr. was presented with a silver disc for sales of "Sem Limites pra Sonhar" in Portugal.

== Background and recording ==
Junior and Tyler recorded "Sem Limites pra Sonhar" in London. It is a bilingual duet, featuring lyrics in Portuguese and English. The track was produced by Cuban musician Óscar Gómez, whose production credits include albums by Celia Cruz and Miliki. The English version was later released on Tyler's compilation album Total Eclipse Anthology (2002), and the bilingual version later appeared on Remixes and Rarities (2017).

== Music video ==
Junior and Tyler recorded the music video in London. It premiered on Fantástico on 11 January 1987.

== Track listing and formats ==
- 12" single
1. "Sem Limites pra Sonhar" (Portuguese/English Version) – 4:21
2. "Sem Limites pra Sonhar /Reaching for the Infinite Heart" (English Version) – 4:21

== Charts ==
| Chart (1987) | Peak position |
|---|---|
| Brazil La Opinión (AP) | 1 |
