= Silhouette in Red =

Studio album by Bonnie Tyler
- Released: 11 October 1993
- Recorded: 1993
- Genre: Pop rock
- Length: 54:22
- Label: Hansa
- Producer: Dieter Bohlen; Gene Capell; Paul Hopkins; Lee Morris; Luis Rodríguez; Ronnie Scott; Ray "Taff" Williams

Bonnie Tyler chronology
The Best (1993)	Silhouette in Red (1993)	The Very Best of Bonnie Tyler Volume 2 (1994)

Singles from Silhouette in Red
- 1. "Sally Comes Around" Released: October 1993 (EU); 2. "From the Bottom of My Lonely Heart" Released: November 1993 (Ger.); 3. "You Are So Beautiful" Released: 1993 (EU); 4. "Stay" Released: February 1994 (Ger.)

Silhouette in Red is the tenth studio album by Welsh singer Bonnie Tyler. It was released on 11 October 1993, through Hansa Records. The album became Tyler's final collaboration with German producer Dieter Bohlen.

The album was released in mainland Europe and was a commercial success. The album was certified Gold in Norway through pre-sales, one day before it was released.

== Background ==
Silhouette in Red was Tyler's third and final release with Hansa Records, following Bitterblue (1991) and Angel Heart (1992).

== Writing and recording ==
Twelve of the album's fifteen tracks were recorded with Dieter Bohlen and Studio 33 in Hamburg, Germany. On 5 July 1993, Tyler and Bohlen were interviewed in the recording studio for an episode of Bravo TV on RTL 2. The Royal London Philharmonic Orchestra feature on "Stay" and "Silhouette in Red", with arrangements by Werner Becker. Luis Rodríguez co-produced four of the album's tracks with Bohlen. Bohlen wrote "Bad Dreams" as an homage to "Black Velvet" by Alannah Myles.

Tyler's cover of "You Are So Beautiful", made famous by Joe Cocker in 1974, was recorded at Matrix Studios in London with producer Gene Capell. Tyler reunited with former bandmates Kevin Dunne, Ray "Taff Williams" and Pete King to record "Before We Get Any Closer" and "You Won't See Me Cry". The former was written and produced by Ronnie Scott, Tyler's former manager and writer of "It's a Heartache", and the latter track was co-written by Tyler's brother, Paul Hopkins.

== Release and promotion ==
Silhouette in Red was released on 11 October 1993 through Hansa Records; it became the final album by Tyler to be released under the label before she moved to EastWest Records in 1994. It became Tyler's first studio album not to receive a vinyl release, with physical releases limited to CD and cassette. "Sally Comes Around" was released as the album's lead single in October 1993, and the album's only charting single with a peak at no. 76 in Germany. "From the Bottom of My Lonely Heart", "You Are So Beautiful" and "Stay" were released later.

In 1994, Tyler embarked on a 47-date tour in support of the album beginning at the Audimax in Regensburg, Germany on 20 January and concluding in Copenhagen, Denmark on 29 March 1994, with dates in Austria, Belgium, Czech Republic, Denmark, France, Germany, Hungary, Norway, Slovakia, Slovenia, Sweden and Switzerland.

== Critical reception ==
In a positive review, AllMusic named "Sally Comes Around", "Send Me the Pillow" and "You Won't See Me Cry" as the album's highlights.

Professional ratings
Review scores
Source	Rating
AllMusic	4/5 stars

== Track listing ==
Silhouette in Red
No.	Title	Writer(s)	Producer(s)	Length
1.	"Sally Comes Around"	Jennifer Blake^{[a]}	Bohlen	3:41
2.	"Fire in My Soul"	Steve Benson^{[a]}	Bohlen	3:51
3.	"Stay"	Blake^{[a]}	Bohlen; Werner Becker^{[b]}	4:02
4.	"Send Me the Pillow"	Dieter Bohlen	Bohlen; Luis Rodríguez^{[c]}	3:31
5.	"From the Bottom of My Lonely Heart"	Howard Houston^{[a]}	Bohlen	3:32
6.	"Silhouette in Red"	Blake^{[a]}	Bohlen; Becker^{[b]}	3:57
7.	"I Climb Every Mountain"	Bohlen	Bohlen; Rodríguez^{[c]}	3:33
8.	"Bad Dreams"	Benson^{[a]}	Bohlen	3:45
9.	"James Dean"	Bohlen	Bohlen; Rodríguez^{[c]}	3:11
10.	"Clouds in My Coffee"	Bohlen	Bohlen; Rodríguez^{[c]}	3:19
11.	"Years May Come"	Houston^{[a]}	Bohlen	3:49
12.	"Cryin' a Little"	Blake^{[a]}	Bohlen; Becker^{[b]}	3:35
13.	"You Are So Beautiful"	Bruce Fisher; Billy Preston	Gene Capell	2:19
14.	"Before We Get Any Closer"	Ronnie Scott; C. Stevens	Scott	4:07
15.	"You Won't See Me Cry"	Lee Morris; Paul Hopkins	Morris; Hopkins; Ray "Taff" Williams	2:45
Total length:				54:22

Notes

- ^a signifies a pseudonym for Dieter Bohlen
- ^b signifies an additional arranger
- ^c signifies an additional producer

== Charts ==
Chart (1993)	Peak position
Austrian Albums (Ö3 Austria)	25
European Top 100 Albums (Music & Media)	54
German Albums (Offizielle Top 100)	28
Norwegian Albums (VG-lista)	6
Swedish Albums (Sverigetopplistan)	40
Swiss Albums (Schweizer Hitparade)	23

== Industry awards ==
The Bravo Otto is a German accolade honoring excellence of performers in film, television and music. The awards are presented annually and voted by readers of Bravo magazine. Silhouette in Red was nominated for Best CD of 1993 in the Female Singers' category, and came in 9th with 1.84% of the vote. The Very Best of Bonnie Tyler, a compilation album released earlier in the year, came in 8th place.

Awards and nominations for Silhouette in Red
Organization	Year	Award	Result	Ref.
Bravo Otto Awards	1993	Best CD of 1993 (Female Singer)	9th place	

== Personnel ==
Credits adapted from liner notes.

=== Musicians ===
- Bonnie Tyler – lead vocals
- John Young – keyboards (1–12), programming (1–12)
- Richard Cottle – keyboards (13)
- Pete King – synthesizer programming (14), string programming (14), guitars (14), drum programming (14)
- Dick Roberts – keyboards (14), synthesizer programming (14), string programming (14), drum programming (14)
- Lee Morris – keyboards (15), drums (15), strings (15)
- Alan Darby – guitars (1–13), all instruments (introduction on 2)
- Ray "Taff" Williams – guitars (14, 15), backing vocals (15)
- Ed Poole – bass (1–13, 15)
- Kevin Dunne – bass (14)
- John Tonks – drums (1–13)
- Royal Philharmonic Orchestra – orchestra (3, 6)
- Adrian Revell – saxophone (15)
- Gerard Presencer – trumpet (15)
- Dieter Bohlen – arrangements (1–12)
- Werner Becker – additional arrangements (3, 6, 12)
- Paul Hopkins – backing vocals (15)

=== Technical ===
- Pete – engineer (14)
- Nigel – engineer (14)
- Sam – engineer (14)
- Dave "Deptford" Pine – engineer (15)

=== Design ===
- David Aspden – management
- Ariola – design
- a-r-t-p-o-o-l – design
- Thomas Sassenbach – art direction
- Andreas Kess – photography

== Bibliography ==
- Tyler, Bonnie (2023). Straight from the Heart. Hodder & Stoughton. ISBN 978-1-39972-625-2.
- Bohlen, Dieter; Kessler, Katja (2002). Nichts als die Wahrheit [Nothing But the Truth] (in German). Ullstein Heyne List GmbH & Co. KG. ISBN 3-453-86143-4.
