= The Wrestling Album =

Soundtrack album by World Wrestling Federation
- Released: November 9, 1985
- Recorded: 1985
- Genre: Pop rock; funk; country
- Length: 37:53
- Label: Epic
- Producer: Rick Derringer; David Wolff; Jim Steinman; Mona Flambé

World Wrestling Federation chronology
The Wrestling Album (1985)	Piledriver: The Wrestling Album II (1987)

Professional ratings
Review scores
Source	Rating
AllMusic	1.5/5 stars

The Wrestling Album is the debut soundtrack album by the World Wrestling Federation (WWF, now WWE), released on November 9, 1985 by Epic Records, at the height of the Rock 'n' Wrestling Connection era. It featured mostly theme music of wrestlers on the roster at the time. The Wrestling Album peaked at No. 84 on the Billboard album sales chart. None of the singles received any heavy radio airplay nor did they crack the Top 100.

== Production ==
Most of the songs were produced by Rick Derringer. David Wolff, at the time Cyndi Lauper's manager and boyfriend, was executive producer. The album was basically Wolff's concept. Jim Steinman composed and produced "Hulk Hogan's Theme", which was used on the Hulk Hogan's Rock 'n' Wrestling cartoon. Lauper participated on the album as a backing vocalist on U.S. Express entrance theme "Real American" (which would eventually become Hulk Hogan's entrance theme) and "For Everybody" as well as producer of "Captain" Lou Albano's track under the pseudonym "Mona Flambé."

The album was reissued in 1998 on CD by Koch Records, who licensed the master rights from Epic/Sony. A 30th-anniversary version was released in June 2015 on Sony's Legacy imprint.

The album's tracks are bridged with semiserious and humorous commentary from Vince McMahon, "Mean Gene" Okerlund, and Jesse "The Body" Ventura. Three singles were issued from the album: "Land of a Thousand Dances?!!?" (in a shortened version with overdubbed saxophones), "Grab Them Cakes," and "Don't Go Messin' with a Country Boy." All three singles were issued in picture sleeves, and featured "Captain Lou's History of Music/Captain Lou" as the B-side. "Rowdy" Roddy Piper's track, "For Everybody," was a cover of the Mike Angelo & The Idols song "Fuck Everybody", with all of the profanity removed. A year after the album's release, Jim Steinman wrote lyrics to "Hulk Hogan's Theme" and re-released it as "Ravishing," the opening track of Bonnie Tyler's 1986 album Secret Dreams and Forbidden Fire. Meat Loaf can be seen briefly playing the drums in the music video for "Land of a Thousand Dances?!!?".

The gatefold cover features the majority of the WWF's 1985 roster posing in a recording studio, with McMahon, Okerlund and Ventura in the foreground and ring announcer Howard Finkel in the center. Lauper can be seen on the back cover wearing a black wig and holding a Rickenbacker guitar.

== Track listing ==
Side A
No.	Title	Writer(s)	Artist(s)	Length
1.	"Land of a Thousand Dances?!!?"	Chris Kenner; Antoine "Fats" Domino	The Wrestlers	4:34
2.	"Grab Them Cakes"	David Wolff; George Pavlis; Vernie "Butch" Taylor	Junkyard Dog	3:27
3.	"Real American"	B. Kinney; Rick Derringer	Derringer	3:22
4.	"Eat Your Heart Out, Rick Springfield"	Jimmy Hart	Jimmy Hart	3:06
5.	"Captain Lou's History of Music / Captain Lou"	A. Anderson; T. Adams	"Captain" Lou Albano and George "The Animal" Steele	3:32

Side B
No.	Title	Writer(s)	Artist(s)	Length
6.	"Hulk Hogan's Theme"	Jim Steinman	WWF All-Stars	3:56
7.	"For Everybody"	M. Fitzgerald	"Rowdy" Roddy Piper	2:44
8.	"Tutti Frutti"	Dorothy LaBostrie; Richard Penniman	"Mean" Gene Okerlund	2:02
9.	"Don't Go Messin' with a Country Boy"	D. Pomus; M. Chapman; J. Dorn	Hillbilly Jim	2:15
10.	"Cara Mia"	Tulio Trapani; Lee Lange	Nikolai Volkoff	2:10
Total length:				37:53

== See also ==
- Music in professional wrestling
