= Bitterblue (song) =

Single by Bonnie Tyler

from the album Bitterblue
- Released: 7 October 1991
- Recorded: Los Angeles, 1991
- Length: 3:48
- Label: Hansa Records, BMG
- Songwriter: Dieter Bohlen
- Producer: Dieter Bohlen

Bonnie Tyler singles chronology
"Save Up All Your Tears" (1988)	"Bitterblue" (1991)	"Against the Wind" (1991)

"Bitterblue" is a song recorded by Welsh singer Bonnie Tyler for her eighth studio album of the same name (1991). It was released on 7 October 1991 by Hansa Records. The song was a European hit, missing the number one spot in Norway to Michael Jackson's song "Black or White". The song was written and produced by Dieter Bohlen.

"Bitterblue" has appeared on several of Tyler's compilation albums including The Very Best of Bonnie Tyler: Volume 1, Comeback: Single Collection '90–'94, Greatest Hits, Total Eclipse Anthology and Ravishing - The Best Of.

== Composition ==
"Bitterblue" was written and produced by Dieter Bohlen, who drew upon Rod Stewart's 1991 single "Rhythm of My Heart" for inspiration. The song features elements of Scottish folk music, including instruments such as bagpipes and accordion.

== Chart performance ==
"Bitterblue" was reasonably successful in Europe. In Norway, the song debuted at number 7, and remained in the Top 10 for sixteen weeks. It reached its peak of number 2 on its fourth charting week, maintaining this position for a second week behind Michael Jackson's "Black or White". "Bitterblue" spent a further six weeks at number 3. The song also spent twenty weeks in the Top 30 Singles in Austria, where it peaked at number five. "Bitterblue" also spent 17 weeks in the German charts, where it reached number seventeen. The single was number 15 in Cash Box Pop Singles Looking Ahead, this chart was equivalent to Billboard's Bubbling Under Hot 100. The single stayed in the European Hot 100 Singles for 15 weeks.

== Critical reception ==
Billboard gave the song a mixed review, stating, "bombastic production, with a rush of bagpipes and a choir of chirping children at the forefront, overpower Tyler's distinctive raspy voice."

== Track listings ==
- Maxi CD
1. "Bitterblue" (Radio Mix) — 3:48
2. "Bitterblue" (True Blue Mix) — 5:47
3. "Too Hot" — 3:26
4. "Whenever You Need Me" — 3:35
- European 7" single
1. "Bitterblue" (Radio Mix) — 3:48
2. "Too Hot" — 3:26
- German 12" single
1. "Bitterblue" (True Blue Mix) — 5:47
2. "Too Hot" — 3:26
3. "Bitterblue" (Radio Mix) — 3:48

== Charts ==
=== Weekly charts ===
Chart (1991–92)	Peak position
Austria (Ö3 Austria Top 40)	5
Denmark (Hitlisten)	11
Europarade	34
European Hot 100 Singles (Music & Media)	44
Germany (GfK)	17
Norway (VG-lista)	2
Switzerland Airplay (Media Control)	11
US Adult Contemporary (Gavin Report)	32
US Cash Box Looking Ahead	15

=== Year–end charts ===
Chart (1992)	Position
Austria (Ö3 Austria Top 40)	20
Germany (Media Control)	97

== Awards ==
=== RSH-GOLD Awards ===
Year	Nominated work	Award	Result
1992	"Bitterblue"	Catchy Song of the Year	Won

== Bibliography ==
- "Billboard Vol. 104". Billboard. Nielsen Business Media, Inc. 1992. ISSN 0006-2510.
- Bohlen, Dieter; Kessler, Katja (2002). Nichts als die Wahrheit [Nothing But the Truth] (in German). Ullstein Heyne List GmbH & Co. KG. ISBN 3-453-86143-4.
