= He's the King =

Single by Bonnie Tyler

from the album All in One Voice
- Released: December 1997
- Length: 4:42
- Label: East West Records
- Songwriter(s): Harold Faltermeyer; Gernot Rothenbach
- Producer(s): Harold Faltermeyer; Gernot Rothenbach

Bonnie Tyler singles chronology
"Limelight" (1996)	"He's the King" (1997)	"Heaven" (1998)

"He's the King" is a song recorded by Welsh singer Bonnie Tyler for her twelfth studio album, All in One Voice (1998). It was released in December 1997 by East West Records as the lead single of the album. The song was written and produced by German songwriters Harold Faltermeyer and Gernot Rothenbach.

"He's the King" charted at number 95 in the German Top 100 Singles Chart, released a year before the album. The song appeared on the 1997 German film The King of St. Pauli, where Tyler can be seen performing the song in a nightclub. It was also featured on the film's soundtrack.

== Background ==
The song was recorded at the Red Deer Studio in Berlin.

== Track listing ==
"He's the King" was released on a maxi CD in December 1997. The fourth track is the theme to The King of St. Pauli, composed by Harold Faltermeyer. Tyler's vocals do not feature on this track.

1. "He's the King (Radio Version)" – 3:45
2. "He's The King (Extended Version)" – 4:43
3. "He's The King (Acoustic Mix)" – 4:12
4. "Der König von St. Pauli (Theme)" – 3:55

== Chart performance ==
Chart (1998)	Peak position
Germany (GfK)	95

== Credits and personnel ==
Credits and personnel adapted from album liner notes.

- Bonnie Tyler – lead vocals
- Harold Faltermeyer – writer, producer, keyboards, accordion
- Gernot Rothenbach – writer, producer
- Wesley Plass – electric guitar
- Andreas Linse – keyboards
- Miriam Stockley – backing vocalist
- Tessa Niles – backing vocalist
- Lance Ellington – backing vocalist
