= Diamond Cut (Bonnie Tyler album) =

Studio album by Bonnie Tyler
- Released: February 1979
- Recorded: 1978
- Studios: RAK Studios, London
- Genres: Country, pop rock
- Length: 35:01
- Label: RCA Victor
- Producers: Robin Geoffrey Cable; Ronnie Scott; Steve Wolfe

Bonnie Tyler chronology
Natural Force (1978)	Diamond Cut (1979)	Goodbye to the Island (1981)

Singles from Diamond Cut
- 1. "Louisiana Rain" Released: 1 December 1978; 2. "My Guns Are Loaded" Released: February 1979; 3. "What a Way to Treat My Heart" Released: March 1979

Diamond Cut is the third studio album by Welsh singer Bonnie Tyler. It was released in February 1979 by RCA Records.

== Critical reception ==
Chuck Pratt of The Pittsburgh Press described the album as "a charmer", but stated that none of the songs were "blockbuster", like "It's a Heartache" from her previous album. He highlighted "The Eyes of a Fool", "What a Way to Treat My Heart" and "Louisiana Rain" as the best tracks.

== Singles ==
The album first single was "Louisiana Rain" a Tom Petty cover, and it reached n.50 in UK Airplay Charts. The second single was "My Guns Are Loaded" hit in France and Canada. "Too Good To Last" was a radio promotion single in Spain.

== Track listing ==
All tracks are written by Ronnie Scott and Steve Wolfe, except where noted.

Side A
No.	Title	Length
1.	"If You Ever Need Me Again"	3:32
2.	"Too Good to Last"	3:46
3.	"What a Way to Treat My Heart"	3:34
4.	"The Eyes of a Fool"	3:18
5.	"Bye Bye Now My Sweet Love" (Alan Tarney)	3:01
Total length:		35:32

Side B
No.	Title	Length
6.	"Louisiana Rain" (Tom Petty)	4:29
7.	"Baby I Just Love You"	3:01
8.	"Words Can Change Your Life"	3:45
9.	"My Guns Are Loaded"	3:45
10.	"I'm a Fool"	3:21

CD/ digital re-issue bonus tracks
No.	Title	Length
11.	"(The World Is Full of) Married Men"	3:57
12.	"My Guns Are Loaded" (single version)	3:15
13.	"(The World Is Full of) Married Men" (12" version)	6:21
14.	"(The World Is Full of) Married Men" (Disco version)	3:58
15.	"I Believe in Your Sweet Love" (single version)	3:58
16.	"(The World Is Full of) Married Men" (Full version)	3:58

== Personnel ==
- Bonnie Tyler – vocals
- Robin Geoffrey Cable – engineer
- Martin Jenner – acoustic guitar, electric guitar, steel guitar, slide guitar
- Steve Wolfe – acoustic guitar, background vocals
- Kevin Dunne – bass guitar
- Dave Markee – bass guitar
- Ed Hamilton – electric guitar
- Alan Tarney – electric guitar
- Gary Waghorn – electric guitar
- Hugh Burns – electric guitar, mandolin
- Mike Barker – dobro
- Neil Adams – drums
- Henry Spinetti – drums
- Graham Smith – harmonica
- Tony Lambert – keyboards
- Pete Wingfield – keyboards
- Jasper – Moog synthesizer, bells, cowbell
- Chris Mercer – tenor saxophone
- Frank Tomes – tuba
- Mike McNaught – string, oboe and French horn arrangements
- John Cameron – arrangement on "(The World is Full of) Married Men"

== Charts ==
=== Weekly charts ===
Chart (1979)	Peak position
Australia (Kent Music Report)	95
Finland (Suomen virallinen singlelista)	13
Norwegian Albums (VG-lista)	14
Swedish Albums (Sverigetopplistan)	14
US Billboard 200	145
US Cashbox Top 200 Albums	135
US Top Country Albums (Billboard)	42
US Record World Country Albums	34
US Record World Top 200 Albums	196

=== Year–end charts ===
Chart (1979)	Peak position
Denmark (Glamrocker)	48

== Release history ==
Country	Date	Format(s)	Label	Ref.
Europe	1979	Vinyl	RCA	
United States	1979	Vinyl	RCA	
Europe	1991	CD	Castle Classics	
United Kingdom	2010	CD	7T's	
