= Against the Wind (Bonnie Tyler song) =

Single by Bonnie Tyler

from the album Bitterblue
- Released: 1991
- Recorded: 1991
- Genre: Soft rock
- Length: 3:37
- Label: Hansa Records
- Songwriter: Dieter Bohlen
- Producer: Dieter Bohlen

Bonnie Tyler singles chronology
"Bitterblue" (1991)	"Against the Wind" (1991)	"Where Were You" (1992)

"Against the Wind" is a song by Welsh singer Bonnie Tyler from her 1991 eighth studio album Bitterblue. It was written by Dieter Bohlen, who produced the song with Luis Rodríguez. The song was released by Hansa Records in 1991 as the second single, after the title track of the album. The song is a soft pop ballad with the lyrics depicting Tyler asking a lover not to break her heart.

"Against the Wind" was a commercial success in Europe, entering the Top 40 in Germany and Austria. It became quite popular because of using the song in the German television series "Tatort", episode "Der Fall Schimanski" Tatort: Der Fall Schimanski.

== Composition ==
"Against the Wind" was written by Dieter Bohlen. Inspired by Rod Stewart's commercial success with "Rhythm of My Heart" in early 1991, Bohlen approached Tyler to record an album with elements of Scottish folk music, including instruments such as bagpipes and accordion. Initially, Tyler was reluctant to record Bohlen's music, though he argued, "you just have to be a bit more commercial."

== Chart performance ==
The song entered the Austrian singles chart on 2 February 1992 at number 19, remaining in the Top 40 for a total of twelve weeks. It peaked at number 13 on its third week before falling through the following three weeks. It rose again to number 14 on 15 March before gradually falling again. The previous single, "Bitterblue", had already entered the Austrian chart in December 1991, and was in its sixth week running when "Against the Wind" debuted. Both songs reached their peak in the same week, though "Bitterblue" reached number 5.

"Against the Wind" also reached the Top 40 in Germany, though only peaking at number 36, remaining on the charts for a total of seven weeks.

== Track listing ==
- 7" single
1. "Against the Wind" (Radio Mix) – 3:37
2. "Against the Wind" (Instrumental) – 3:37
- CD / 12" single
1. "Against the Wind" (Radio Mix) – 3:41
2. "Against the Wind" (Long Version) – 5:07
3. "Against the Wind" (Instrumental) – 3:41

== Credits and personnel ==
Credits adapted from AllMusic:

- Bonnie Tyler – lead vocals
- Dieter Bohlen – producer, writer, engineering
- Luis Rodríguez – producer
- Kenny Aronoff – drums
- Roy Bittan – keyboards
- Richard Gottle – keyboards
- Randy Jackson – bass guitar
- John Pierce – guitar
- Tim Pierce – acoustic guitar
- Waddy Wachtel – guitar

== Charts ==
Chart (1992)	Peak position
Austria (Ö3 Austria Top 40)	13
Germany (GfK)	36
Eurocharts European Hot 100 Singles	86
Swiss Airplay Swiss Charts	15
Norway Airplay VG-lista	11

== Bibliography ==
- Bohlen, Dieter; Kessler, Katja (2002). Nichts als die Wahrheit [Nothing But the Truth] (in German). Ullstein Heyne List GmbH & Co. KG. ISBN 3-453-86143-4.
