= Angel Heart (Bonnie Tyler album) =

Studio album by Bonnie Tyler
- Released: 5 October 1992
- Recorded: 1992
- Genre: Rock
- Length: 57:57
- Label: Hansa
- Producer: Dieter Bohlen; Gene Capel; David Madiran; Luis Rodríguez

Bonnie Tyler chronology
Bitterblue (1991)	Angel Heart (1992)	The Very Best of Bonnie Tyler (1993)

Singles from Angel Heart
- 1. "Fools Lullaby" Released: September 1992 (EU); 2. "Call Me" Released: December 1992 (EU)

Angel Heart is the ninth album by Welsh singer Bonnie Tyler released in 1992. It is the second of three albums Tyler released with Hansa Records, succeeding Bitterblue and preceding Silhouette in Red, achieving European success and spawning two hits, "Fools Lullaby" and "Call Me".

The majority of the tracks were written by Tyler's producer, Dieter Bohlen. Tyler duetted with Frankie Miller on "Save Your Love", the first time Tyler has duetted with Miller since 1983 on her album Faster Than the Speed of Night.

== Critical reception ==
Professional ratings
Review scores
Source	Rating
AllMusic	4/5 stars

Charlotte Dillon of AllMusic described Angel Heart as "album to add to any rock collection" featuring "a pleasing mixture of ballads and upbeat pop".

== Track list ==
No.	Title	Writer(s)	Producer(s)	Length
1.	"Fools Lullaby"	Howard Houston^{[a]}	Houston^{[a]}	3:52
2.	"Take a Chance"	Dieter Bohlen	Bohlen; Luis Rodríguez^{[b]}	3:39
3.	"Race to the Fire"	Bohlen	Bohlen; Rodríguez^{[b]}	3:52
4.	"Sending Me Angels"	Frankie Miller; Jerry Lynn Williams	Gene Capel; David Madiran	5:27
5.	"Call Me"	Steve Benson^{[a]}	Benson^{[a]}	3:59
6.	"Angel Heart"	Houston^{[a]}	Houston^{[a]}	3:49
7.	"Daytime Friends"	Bohlen	Bohlen; Rodríguez^{[b]}	4:19
8.	"God Gave Love to You"	Bohlen	Bohlen; Rodríguez^{[b]}	4:31
9.	"All We Have Is Tonight"	Benson^{[a]}	Benson^{[a]}	3:36
10.	"I'm Only a Lonely Child"	Bohlen	Bohlen; Rodríguez^{[b]}	3:09
11.	"Born to Be a Winner"	Benson^{[a]}	Benson^{[a]}	4:13
12.	"Save Your Love" (with Frankie Miller)	Miller; Williams	Capel; Madiran	5:16
13.	"You're the Greatest Love"	Houston^{[a]}^{[c]}; Benson^{[a]}^{[d]}; Bonnie Tyler^{[d]}	Houston^{[a]}	3:52
14.	"I Cry Myself to Sleep at Night"	Robert John "Mutt" Lange; Craig Joiner; Anthony Mitman	Capel; Madiran	4:23
Total length:				57:57

Notes

- ^a signifies a pseudonym for Dieter Bohlen.
- ^b signifies an additional producer.
- ^c credited for music only.
- ^d credited for lyrics only.

== Personnel ==
- Bonnie Tyler – vocals
- Frankie Miller - vocals
- Graham Broad – drums
- Alan Darby – guitar
- Ed Poole – bass
- Vladimir Asriev – violin
- Terry Devine-King – keyboards, programming
- Elisha – background vocals

== Charts ==
Chart (1992)	Peak position
Austrian Albums (Ö3 Austria)	9
European Top 100 Albums (Music & Media)	39
Finland (Suomen virallinen singlelista)	13
German Albums (Offizielle Top 100)	28
Hungarian Albums (Hungarian Recording Industry Association)	39
Norwegian Albums (VG-lista)	4
Swedish Albums (Sverigetopplistan)	30
Swiss Albums (Schweizer Hitparade)	14

== Certifications ==
Region	Certification	Certified units/sales
Austria (IFPI Austria)	Gold	25,000^{*}
Germany (BVMI)	Gold	250,000^{^}
Norway (IFPI Norway)	2× Platinum	100,000^{*}
Switzerland (IFPI Switzerland)	Gold	25,000^{^}
^{*} Sales figures based on certification alone.^{^} Shipments figures based on certification alone.
