= Hide Your Heart (song) =

Single by Bonnie Tyler

- Artwork for UK/European single releases (CD edition pictured)

Single by Bonnie Tyler

from the album Hide Your Heart
- B-side: "I'm Not Foolin'"
- Released: 25 April 1988
- Recorded: 1987–1988
- Genre: Hard Rock
- Length: 4:25
- Label: Columbia
- Songwriters: Paul Stanley, Desmond Child, Holly Knight
- Producer: Desmond Child

Bonnie Tyler singles chronology
"The Best" (1988)	"Hide Your Heart" (1988)	"Save Up All Your Tears" (1988)

Hide Your Heart is a song by Welsh singer Bonnie Tyler, released in 1988 as the second single on her album of the same name. The song was written by Kiss rhythm guitarist and vocalist Paul Stanley and American songwriters Desmond Child and Holly Knight. Although the song failed to chart (except in Finland), it has appeared on several compilations.

== Background ==
"Hide Your Heart" was demoed and rejected for Crazy Nights, the 14th studio album by Kiss. Stanley offered the song to other artists, with Bonnie Tyler recording it first for her seventh studio album Hide Your Heart (1988). Covers of the song later appeared in 1989 on multiple different albums: Robin Beck's Trouble or Nothin', Molly Hatchet's Lightning Strikes Twice, Kiss's Hot in the Shade, and Ace Frehley's Trouble Walkin'.

== Charts ==
Chart (1988)	Peak position
Finland (Suomen virallinen singlelista)	22

== Album appearances ==
- Hide Your Heart
- The Very Best of Bonnie Tyler
- The Best (French version)
- Power & Passion – The Very Best Of Bonnie Tyler
- Total Eclipse Anthology
- Ravishing: The Best of Bonnie Tyler
- Holding Out for a Hero – The Very Best Of Bonnie Tyler
- Best of 3 CD
- Bonnie Tyler: The Collection
- All the Hits

== Kiss version ==
"Hide Your Heart"

Single by Kiss

from the album Hot in the Shade
- B-side: "Betrayed"
- Released: 17 October 1989
- Recorded: August 1989
- Genre: Pop metal; hard rock
- Length: 4:25
- Label: Mercury; Vertigo (Europe)
- Songwriters: Paul Stanley, Desmond Child, Holly Knight
- Producers: Gene Simmons & Paul Stanley

Kiss singles chronology
"(You Make Me) Rock Hard" (1988)	"Hide Your Heart" (1989)	"Forever (remix)" (1990)

"Hide Your Heart" was covered by American rock band Kiss on their 15th studio album Hot in the Shade, and is the third of four versions released in 1989. The first version was by Molly Hatchet on their album Lightning Strikes Twice, released on September 6. The second version was by former Kiss guitarist Ace Frehley on his fourth studio album Trouble Walkin'. The last version of the song was by Robin Beck, released on November 9 on her album Trouble Or Nothin'.

=== Release ===
A music video was filmed on top of the Hotel Royale in Los Angeles, and was very popular on MTV. Despite this, the song was not a big success on radio, charting its highest No. 59 in the United Kingdom and reaching No. 22 on the US Album Rock Tracks chart. Paul Stanley performed the song during his 2006 solo tour in support of his second studio album Live to Win and it appears on his live album and DVD One Live Kiss. It was also played live during the band's 40th anniversary tour and "End of the Road" tour.

=== Personnel ===
- Paul Stanley – rhythm guitar, lead and backing vocals
- Gene Simmons – bass guitar, backing vocals
- Eric Carr – drums, percussion, backing vocals
- Bruce Kulick – lead and additional guitar
- Phil Ashley – keyboards, backing vocals

=== Album appearances ===
- Hot in the Shade
- The Best of Kiss, Volume 2: The Millennium Collection
- The Box Set

=== Charts ===
Chart (1989–1990)	Peak position
Australia (ARIA)	60
Canada Top Singles (RPM)	92
UK Singles (Official Charts)	59
US Billboard Hot 100	66
US Mainstream Rock (Billboard)	22

== Ace Frehley version ==
=== Personnel ===
- Ace Frehley – lead guitar, lead vocals
- Richie Scarlet – rhythm guitar, backing vocals
- John Regan – bass guitar, synthesizer
- Anton Fig – drums
- Peter Criss – percussion, backing vocals
- Peppi Castro – backing vocals

== Other versions ==
- Molly Hatchet – Lightning Strikes Twice
- Robin Beck – Trouble or Nothin'
- Sankt-Peterburg (Russian band) – Steps with new lyrics
- Yahoo - (Brazilian band) Para Raio - - with new lyrics
