= Fools Lullaby =

Single by Bonnie Tyler

from the album Angel Heart
- Released: September 1992
- Genre: Soft rock
- Length: 3:52
- Label: Hansa
- Songwriter: Dieter Bohlen
- Producer: Dieter Bohlen

Bonnie Tyler singles chronology
"The Desert Is in Your Heart" (1992)	"Fools Lullaby" (1992)	"Call Me" (1992)

Music video
- "Fools Lullaby" on YouTube

"Fools Lullaby" is a song recorded by Welsh singer Bonnie Tyler for her ninth studio album, Angel Heart (1992). It was released by Hansa Records as the lead single from the album, written by Tyler's at-the-time producer, Dieter Bohlen. The single was most successful in Norway where it peaked at number six. The lyrics depict Tyler asking her ex-lover to rekindle their relationship.

== Critical reception ==
Charlotte Dillon from AllMusic highlighted "Fools Lullaby" as a "top-notch track" in a review of Tyler's album Angel Heart.

== Chart performance ==
"Fools Lullaby" gave Tyler her eighth top ten hit in Norway. The song debuted on the Norwegian Singles Chart at number eight, rising to its peak at number six in the following week, and spent a total of five weeks on the chart.

In Austria, "Fools Lullaby" debuted at number 27, peaking at number 17 and spent a total of twelve weeks on the chart.

== Live performances ==
Tyler performed "Fools Lullaby" on various European television shows, including Casino, Peter's Pop Show and Le monde est à vous.

== Format and track listing ==
- CD single
1. "Fools Lullaby" (Radio Mix) — 3:48
2. "Fools Lullaby" (Sweet Lullaby Mix) — 5:30
3. "Race to the Fire" (Radio Mix) — 3:53
4. "Race to the Fire" (Race Mix) — 5:26
- Dutch 7" LP
1. "Fools Lullaby" (Radio Mix) — 3:52
2. "Race to the Fire" (Radio Mix) — 3:53

== Charts ==
=== Weekly charts ===
Weekly chart performance
Chart (1992)	Peak position
Austria (Ö3 Austria Top 40)	17
European Hot 100 Singles (Music & Media)	96
Finland (Suomen virallinen lista)	36
Germany (GfK)	29
Norway (VG-lista)	6
