= All in One Voice =

Studio album by Bonnie Tyler
- Released: 9 November 1998
- Genre: Pop rock
- Length: 53:03
- Label: EastWest Records
- Producer: Mike Batt; Harold Faltermeyer; Jimmy Smyth

Bonnie Tyler chronology
Free Spirit (1995)	All in One Voice (1998)	Greatest Hits (2001)

Singles from All in One Voice
- 1. "He's the King" Released: December 1997 (Ger.); 2. "Heaven" Released: 1998 (Ger.)

Professional ratings
Review scores
Source	Rating
Allmusic	2/5 stars

All in One Voice is the twelfth studio album by Welsh singer Bonnie Tyler. It was released in 1998 by EastWest Records, following her previous album with EastWest, Free Spirit (1995). The album remains the least commercially successful in Tyler's career as it failed to chart worldwide.

== Recording ==
Tracks produced by Jimmy Smyth were recorded at Full Moon, Westland and Park House Studios in Dublin, Ireland. "The Reason Why" was recorded at Boogie Park Studios in Hamburg, and "I Put a Spell on You" was recorded for Mike Batt's album Philharmania at Abbey Road Studios in London. The remaining tracks were recorded at Red Deer Studios in Germany.

== Promotion ==
=== Singles ===
"He's the King" was released ahead of All in One Voice in December 1997. The song was originally used for the German TV series The King of St. Pauli. Tyler made an appearance in one of the episodes performing the song in a casino. "He's the King" spent one week on the German Singles Chart at number 95.

"Heaven" was released as the second single in 1998. The song was first performed at Melodifestivalen 1997—Sweden's national selection competition for the Eurovision Song Contest—by N-Mix, under the title "Där en ängel hälsat på" (Where an angel has visited in English), where it came 2nd.

== Track listing ==
No.	Title	Writer(s)	Producer(s)	Length
1.	"Heaven"	Per Andreasson; Permilla Emme	Jimmy Smyth	3:24
2.	"Like an Ocean"	Andreasson; Emme	Smyth	4:08
3.	"Soon Will Be Too Late"	Andreasson; Emme	Smyth	3:52
4.	"You Always Saw the Blue Skies"	Will Jennings; Frankie Miller	Smyth	3:52
5.	"We Can Start Here"	Máire Brennan; Dennis Wood	Smyth	4:03
6.	"Angel of the Morning"	Chip Taylor	Smyth	3:43
7.	"The Reason Why"	Paul Hopkins; Lee Morris	Graham Laybourne	3:50
8.	"Return to Blue"	Eric Brodka; Gernot Rothenbach	Harold Faltermeyer; Rothenbach	3:26
9.	"You’re Breaking My Heart Again"	Brodka; Rothenbach	Faltermeyer; Rothenbach	3:37
10.	"I Put a Spell on You"	Screamin' Jay Hawkins	Mike Batt	4:38
11.	"I’ll Never Let You Down"	Miller	Smyth	3:52
12.	"The Rose"	Amanda McBroom	Faltermeyer; Rothenbach	3:24
13.	"He's the King"	Faltermyer; Rothenbach	Faltermeyer; Rothenbach	4:48
14.	"Silent Night"	Franz Gruber; Josef Mohr	Faltermeyer	2:26
Total length:				53:03

== Personnel ==
Credits are adapted from the album's liner notes; the credits for tracks 8–14 are incomplete.

=== Musicians ===
- Bonnie Tyler – lead vocals (all tracks), backing vocals (1)
- Jimmy Smyth – production (1–6, 11), backing vocals (1, 6), choir arrangement (1), electric guitar (1–2, 4–6), acoustic guitar (1, 3–4, 6), gut string guitar (2–3), programming (2, 4–6) Hammond organ (4), bass (4–6)
- Graham Laybourne – production (7), programming (7), keyboards (7), backing vocals (7), mandolin (7), Gibson guitars (7)
- Harold Faltermeyer – production (8–9, 12–14), arrangement (14)
- Gernot Rothenbach – production (8–9, 12–13)
- Mike Batt – production (10), arrangement (10), conducting (10)
- Tessa Niles – backing vocals (1–2, 6)
- Katie Kissoon – backing vocals (1–2, 6)
- Jenny Newman – backing vocals (1, 4–6)
- Ed Kenehan – backing vocals (1)
- Conor Stevens – backing vocals (4)
- Karen Hammill – backing vocals (6)
- Robbie Casserly – backing vocals (6)
- Irish Film Orchestras - IFO Orchestra (1,6)
- Fiachra Trench – strings arrangements (1, 6)
- David Downes – uilleann pipes (1, 5), low whistle (2), choir arrangement (5)
- Paul McAteer – additional drums (1)
- Anto Drennan – electric guitar (2), gut string guitar (2)
- Frank Gallagher – violin (2), viola (2–4), fiddle (4), tin whistle (4)
- Tom Molloy – bass (2)
- Billy Farrell – programming (2, 4, 6)
- Peter McKinney – additional drums (5)
- Gerry O'Connor – violin (6)
- Benjamin Hüllenkrämer – bass (7)
- Axel Wernecke – drums (7)
- Maik Bösenberg – percussion (7)
- Herbert Böhme – backing vocals (7)
- Sebi – special effects (7)
- Andreas Linse – arrangement (14)
- Royal Philharmonic Orchestra (10)

=== Technical ===
- Achim Kruse – mastering (all tracks)
- Graham Laybourne – remixing (1–6, 11)
- Harold Faltermeyer – engineering (14), mixing (14)
- Gernot Rothenbach – engineering (14), mixing (14)
- David Cooke – mixing (14)
- Bill Somerville-Large – engineering (1, 6)
- Jon Mallison – engineering (1–6)
- Tim Martin – engineering (1–6)
- Ed Kenehan – assistant engineering (1–6)
- Ciaran Cahill – assistant engineering (4–5)
- Ryan Martin – assistant engineering (6)
