= Bitterblue =

Studio album by Bonnie Tyler
- Released: 11 November 1991
- Recorded: 1991
- Genre: Pop rock
- Length: 58:40
- Label: Hansa
- Producers: Roy Bittan; Dieter Bohlen; Giorgio Moroder; Luis Rodríguez; David Yorath

Bonnie Tyler chronology
Heaven & Hell (1989)	Bitterblue (1991)	Angel Heart (1992)

Singles from Bitterblue
- 1. "Bitterblue" Released: 7 October 1991; 2. "Against the Wind" Released: 16 December 1991; 3. "Where Were You" Released: 1 June 1992

Bitterblue is the eighth studio album by Welsh singer Bonnie Tyler. It was released on 11 November 1991, through Hansa Records. Bitterblue is a pop rock album, described by Dieter Bohlen as "more commercial" than her previous albums. Bohlen began working with Tyler in early 1991, writing and producing multiple songs for the album. Bitterblue also features compositions from Albert Hammond, Nik Kershaw and Giorgio Moroder.

Bitterblue received mixed reviews from music critics, with the songs being complimented but the production criticised. The album had major success in mainland Europe, where it reached number one in Austria and Norway. In 1992 it was certified 3× Platinum by IFPI Norway. Three singles were released from the album, including the hits "Bitterblue" and "Against the Wind".

== Writing and recording ==
Tyler signed to Hansa Records in 1990. Bitterblue was her first multi-producer album, with contributions from Dieter Bohlen, Luis Rodríguez, Roy Bittan, David Yorath, Giorgio Moroder and Nik Kershaw. Bohlen claimed that Tyler was reluctant to record his songs as she perceived them to be more commercial-sounding than her previous work. The title track includes elements of Scottish folk music, including bagpipes and accordion, and was inspired by the Rod Stewart hit "Rhythm of My Heart".

Bitterblue was the first of three albums that Tyler recorded with Bohlen. His songwriting and production work was often credited under the names Howard Houston, Steve Benson and Jennifer Blake. Tyler claimed that Bohlen chose to disguise his involvement to avoid radio DJs developing preconceptions about the album.

Bitterblue was recorded at five recording studios located in Germany, the UK and in the US. Bohlen wrote, recorded and produced his own songs, with Luis Rodríguez acting as co-producer on three tracks. Nik Kershaw, Giorgio Moroder David Yorath all wrote and produced their own songs. Songs written by Albert Hammond and Diane Warren were produced by Roy Bittan at Conway and A&M Studios in Los Angeles. Tyler recorded "Heaven Is Here" as a duet with Moroder, and "Till the End of Time" with Dan Hartman. Both songs were written by Moroder. Tyler also co-wrote the lyrics for "Whenever You Need Me" with David Madiran.

== Critical reception ==
Professional ratings
Review scores
Source	Rating
AllMusic	3.5/5 stars

Tomas Mureika of AllMusic rated the album three and a half stars out of five, describing the album as "a pleasant collection of pop tunes." He opined that her pairing with Giorgio Moroder "[gave] Tyler's work a contemporary sheen that frames her vocals within the songs." Mureika concluded that Bitterblue is "better than most pop records," but not as strong as her work with Jim Steinman and Desmond Child. In a review of the lead single, Billboard criticised Bohlen's production; "bombastic production, with a rush of bagpipes and a choir of chirping children at the forefront, overpower Tyler's distinctive raspy voice."

== Track listing ==
No.	Title	Writer(s)	Producer(s)	Length
1.	"Bitterblue"	Dieter Bohlen	Bohlen	3:50
2.	"Against the Wind"	Bohlen	Bohlen; Luis Rodríguez	3:59
3.	"Careless Heart"	Albert Hammond; Roy Orbison; Diane Warren	Roy Bittan	4:33
4.	"Whenever You Need Me"	David Yorath; Bonnie Tyler; David Madiran	Yorath	4:04
5.	"Where Were You"	Hammond; Holly Knight	Bittan	5:12
6.	"Save Me"	Hammond; Warren	Bittan	4:09
7.	"He's Got a Hold On Me"	Nik Kershaw	Kershaw	4:15
8.	"Keep Your Love Alive"	Giorgio Moroder; Tom Whitlock	Moroder	4:24
9.	"Tell Me the Truth"	Bohlen	Bohlen; Rodríguez	3:48
10.	"Heaven Is Here" (with Giorgio Moroder)	Moroder; Whitlock	Moroder	4:40
11.	"Love Is in Love Again"	Moroder; Whitlock	Moroder	4:40
12.	"Till the End of Time" (with Dan Hartman)	Moroder; Whitlock	Moroder	4:03
13.	"Too Hot"	Bohlen	Bohlen	3:27
14.	"Why"	Bohlen	Bohlen; Rodríguez	3:56
Total length:				58:40

== Personnel ==
Credits adapted from AllMusic.

Technical and Design

- Dieter Bohlen (as Howard Houston) – recording (1, 13), mixing (1, 13)
- Dieter Bohlen – recording (2, 9, 14), mixing (2, 9, 14)
- Luis Rodriguez – recording (2, 9, 14), mixing (2, 9, 14)
- Phil Kaffel – engineer and recording (3, 5, 6), mixing (3, 5, 6)
- David Yorath – recording (4), mixing (4)
- Stuart Bruce – recording (7), mixing (7)
- Brian Reeves – engineer (8, 10, 11, 12), mixing (8, 10, 11, 12)
- Giorgio Moroder – mixing (8, 10, 11, 12)
- Thomas Sassenbach – art direction
- Aaron's Outfit – design
- Ariola – design
- Markus Amon – photography
- Jeff Weiss – photography
- David Aspden – management

Musicians and Vocals

- Bonnie Tyler – vocals
- Dan Hartman – vocals (12)
- Giorgio Moroder – programming (8, 10, 11, 12) - vocals (10)
- Roy Bittan – keyboards (3, 5, 6), arrangements (3, 5, 6)
- Richard Cottle – keyboards (7)
- Nik Kershaw – keyboards (7), programming (7), guitars (7), arrangements (7)
- Scott Greer – programming (8, 10, 11, 12)
- John Pierce – guitars (3, 5, 6)
- Waddy Wachtel – guitars (3, 5, 6)
- Tim Pierce – acoustic guitar (3, 5, 6)
- Teddy Castellucci – guitars (8, 10, 11, 12)
- Randy Jackson – bass (3, 6, 6)
- Kenny Aronoff – drums (3, 5, 6)
- Gary Herbig – saxophone (8, 10, 11, 12)
- Dieter Bohlen – arrangements (as Howard Houston on 1, 13), arrangements (2, 9, 14)
- David Yorath – arrangements (4)
- Jackie Challenor – backing vocals (7)
- Miriam Stockley – backing vocals (7)
- Debbie McGlendon-Smith – backing vocals (8, 10, 11, 12)
- Joe Pizzulo – backing vocals (8, 10, 11, 12)
- Marietta Waters – backing vocals (8, 10, 11, 12)

== Charts ==
=== Weekly charts ===
Chart (1991)	Peak position
Austrian Albums (Ö3 Austria)	1
European Top 100 Albums (Music & Media)	21
Finland Seura/IFPI (Music & Media)	6
German Albums (Offizielle Top 100)	22
Norwegian Albums (VG-lista)	1
Swedish Albums (Sverigetopplistan)	22
Swiss Albums (Schweizer Hitparade)	21

=== Year-end charts ===
Chart (1992)	Peak position
Austrian Albums Chart (Ö3 Austria Top 40)	12
European Top 100 Albums (Music & Media)	79
Norwegian Albums Chart (VG-lista)	15

== Certifications ==
Region	Certification	Certified units/sales
Austria (IFPI Austria)	Platinum	50,000^{*}
Germany (BVMI)	Gold	250,000^{^}
Norway (IFPI Norway)	3× Platinum	155,000
Sweden (GLF)	Gold	50,000^{^}
Switzerland (IFPI Switzerland)	Gold	25,000^{^}
^{*} Sales figures based on certification alone.^{^} Shipments figures based on certification alone.

== Release history ==
Country	Date	Format(s)	Label	Ref.
Europe	11 November 1991	CD; vinyl	Hansa	
Japan	21 May 1992	CD; vinyl	Hansa	
Brazil	10 April 1992	vinyl	BMG Ariola	
United States	24 April 2012	Digital download	Rdeg	

== Accolades ==
RSH Gold Award

Year	Nominee / work	Award	Result
1992	Bitterblue	Most successful German-produced interpreter, female	Won
