= Hide Your Heart (album) =

Studio album by Bonnie Tyler
- Released: 9 May 1988
- Recorded: 1987–1988
- Studio: Bearsville Studios (Bearsville, New York); The Hit Factory and Right Track Recording (New York City, New York).
- Genre: Rock, Hard Rock
- Length: 44:22
- Label: CBS; Columbia
- Producer: Desmond Child

Bonnie Tyler chronology
| The Greatest Hits (1986) | Hide Your Heart (1988) | Heaven & Hell (1989) |

Alternative cover
- Notes From America cover

Singles from Hide Your Heart
- 1. "The Best" Released: 18 January 1988; 2. "Hide Your Heart" Released: 25 April 1988; 3. "Save Up All Your Tears" Released: 15 August 1988; 4. "Notes from America" Released: 23 January 1989

Professional ratings
Review scores
| Source | Rating |
|---|---|
| AllMusic | 3.5/5 stars |

Hide Your Heart is the seventh studio album by Welsh singer Bonnie Tyler. It was released on 9 May 1988 through CBS Records. In North and South America, it was released through Columbia Records under the alternative title Notes from America. Tyler recorded the album with producer Desmond Child at Bearsville Studios in New York, and many of the tracks later became hit singles for other artists, most notably "The Best" for Tina Turner.

Critics praised the album for its rock-oriented sound, but some viewed Hide Your Heart as overly commercial-sounding. The album was supported by the Hide Your Heart Tour (1988), which consisted of nineteen dates throughout the United Kingdom. The album performed well in the Scandinavian countries, peaking at no. 2 in Norway, but it only reached at no. 78 in the UK and didn't chart at all in the US.

== Background and writing ==
After recording four country-pop albums under RCA Records in the late 1970s and early 80s, Tyler signed to CBS/Columbia and began working with songwriter and producer Jim Steinman. Their collaboration led to two studio albums, and the worldwide hit singles "Total Eclipse of the Heart" and "Holding Out for a Hero". Tyler stated that while she enjoyed working with Steinman, his recording process was slow, and she decided to create her next album with Desmond Child who wrote two songs for Tyler's album Secret Dreams and Forbidden Fire (1986).

Hide Your Heart was recorded at the Bearsville Studios in Woodstock, New York, with additional recording at The Hit Factory and Right Track in New York City. CBS gave Child a budget for three songs, but he stretched it to record a ten-track album. The opening track, "Notes from America", features a chorus of 50 people who were invited into the studio from the street outside.

Child co-wrote "Hide Your Heart" with Paul Stanley and Holly Knight, and it was originally intended for the Kiss album Crazy Nights (1987). Tyler's version was the first to be released in 1988, though Kiss did eventually record it on their follow-up record, Hot in the Shade (1989). "Don't Turn Around" was first recorded by Tina Turner as the B-side to her 1986 single "Typical Male", and it later became a hit for both Aswad and Ace of Base. Hide Your Heart also features the original version of "Save Up All Your Tears", which became a hit for Robin Beck in 1989, and later for Cher in 1991. "The Best" was written by Mike Chapman and Holly Knight, and originally intended for a male artist, but the track found its way to Tyler after he declined. Tina Turner covered the track in 1989, and it became a worldwide hit.

The album also contains a cover of "Turtle Blues" by Big Brother and the Holding Company featuring Janis Joplin from the album Cheap Thrills (1968). Tyler recorded the track in the same vocal booth as Joplin's original. Bass guitarist Seth Glassman and lead guitarist John McCurry swapped instruments to give the track and impromptu sound. It was recorded at 2 a.m. after a jamming session. McCurry overdubbed the guitar solo after the song was recorded.

== Release and promotion ==
Hide Your Heart was released on 9 May 1988, while Tyler was in the middle of her Hide Your Heart Tour; her first headline tour of the UK since she released Natural Force in 1978. She later performed at Reading Festival on 27 August 1988. Tyler then embarked on a six-week tour of the Soviet Union between November and December 1988.

"The Best" was released as the album's lead single in January 1988. It peaked at no. 10 in Norway, no. 25 in Finland, and no. 95 in the United Kingdom. "Hide Your Heart" was released in April 1988, and peaked at no. 22 in Finland. A live version of "Save Up All Your Tears", recorded at the Hammersmith Apollo in London, was released as a single in the UK, and the studio version was later released as a promotional single in the United States. "Notes from America" followed as the album's final single in January 1989.

== Critical reception ==
Hide Your Heart received generally positive reviews from music critics. It was listed as an Album of the Week in Music & Media, who wrote "with her powerful, raucous voice, the British rock singer delivers a pleasant album full of hook-heavy material, pompous build-ups and dramatic grooves." Mario Tarradell of The Miami News described Tyler as "revitalized" after her work with Jim Steinman. He noted Tyler's cover of Janis Joplin's song "Turtle Blues" as the album highlight, stating, "Tyler captures the jazzy raspiness and riveting intensity characteristic of Joplin's style and adds her own theatrics to create an impressive homage to the late singer." Tarradell added that Tyler "isn't always blessed with the best material and has been a victim of a roller-coaster career," but described the album as an "impressive return" to rock music. Curt Anderson of Bangor Daily News agreed that "Turtle Blues" is the album highlight, and "stands head and shoulders above the rest [of the tracks]." He also opined that Tyler's cover of "To Love Somebody" is "better than the original." He did argue, however, that the album is over-produced, saying that the core of "Don't Turn Around" gets "lost in a tidal wave of sound" as the choir enters. He concluded, saying that the track "Notes from America" sounds "like much of the commercial rock 'n' roll on the radio," and that "it's a shame [Tyler] isn't singing more memorable music." In Raw magazine, Malcolm Dome described the single "Notes from America" as "anthemic", but he opined that it sounded too similar to other popular Billboard-charting hard rock songs.

== Track listing ==
| No. | Title | Writer(s) | Length |
|---|---|---|---|
| 1. | "Notes from America" | Desmond Child; Robbie Seidman | 4:54 |
| 2. | "Hide Your Heart" | Paul Stanley; Child; Holly Knight | 4:25 |
| 3. | "Don't Turn Around" | Diane Warren; Albert Hammond | 4:18 |
| 4. | "Save Up All Your Tears" | Child; Warren | 4:24 |
| 5. | "To Love Somebody" | Barry Gibb; Robin Gibb | 5:49 |
| 6. | "Take Another Look at Your Heart" | Michael Bolton; Child | 3:47 |
| 7. | "The Best" | Mike Chapman; Knight | 4:16 |
| 8. | "Shy with You" | Seidman | 3:40 |
| 9. | "Streets of Little Italy" | Seidman | 4:37 |
| 10. | "Turtle Blues" | Janis Joplin | 4:12 |
| Total length: | | | 44:22 |

== Personnel ==
- Bonnie Tyler – vocals, backing vocals (8)
- Chuck Kentis – keyboards (1, 3–9), synthesizers (1, 3–9), organ (2, 10)
- Gregg Mangiafico – acoustic piano (5, 10)
- Holly Knight – additional keyboards (6, 7)
- Bette Sussman – acoustic piano (9)
- John McCurry – guitars (1–9), lead guitar (10), bass (10)
- Tony Levin – bass (1, 3, 6)
- John Regan – bass (2, 4, 8, 9)
- Seth Glassman – bass (5, 7), rhythm guitar (10)
- Jerry Marotta – drums, percussion, choir vocals (5), backing vocals (6)
- Ronnie Cuber – baritone saxophone (5, 10)
- Louis Cortelezzi – tenor saxophone ( 5), sax solo (5, 10)
- Lawrence Feldman – tenor saxophone (5, 10)
- Keith O'Quinn – trombone (5, 10)
- Joe Shepley – trumpet (5, 10)
- Ralph Schuckett – horn arrangements and conductor (5, 10)
- Elaine Caswell – backing vocals (1, 6, 7, 8), choir vocals (3, 5)
- Desmond Child – backing vocals (1, 6, 7, 8), gang vocals (2), choir vocals (3, 5), featured vocals (9)
- Diana Grasselli – backing vocals (1, 8), choir vocals (3)
- Myriam Naomi Valle – backing vocals (1, 7, 8), choir vocals (3, 5)
- Joe Lynn Turner – featured vocals (1), gang vocals (2), choir vocals (3), backing vocals (6, 8)
- Louis Merlino – gang vocals (2), backing vocals (4, 6, 7, 8), choir vocals (5)
- Al Scotti – gang vocals (2)
- Bernie Shanahan – gang vocals (2)
- Steven Savitt – choir vocals (3), backing vocals (6)
- Pattie Darcy – backing vocals (4)
- Janice Payson – backing vocals (8)
- Melanie Williams – backing vocals (8)

== Production ==
- Desmond Child – producer
- Sir Arthur Payson – recording
- Chris Isca – additional engineer, assistant engineer
- Thom Cadley – assistant engineer
- George Cowan – assistant engineer
- Jay Healy – assistant engineer
- Chris Laidlaw – assistant engineer
- Danny Mormando – assistant engineer
- David Thoener – mixing (1, 3–10)
- Bob Rock – mixing (2)
- George Marino – mastering at Sterling Sound (New York City, New York)
- Steven Savitt – production manager
- Audrey Bernstein – illustrations
- Bill Smith Studio – design
- John Swannell – photography
- Keith Harris – hair stylist
- J. J. – hair stylist
- Cheryl Phelps Gardner – make-up
- David Aspden – management

== Charts ==
| Chart (1988) | Peak position |
|---|---|
| Canada RPM Top Albums (RPM) | 91 |
| European Top 100 Albums (Music & Media) | 49 |
| Finland (Suomen virallinen singlelista) | 15 |
| German Albums (Offizielle Top 100) | 64 |
| Norwegian Albums (VG-lista) | 2 |
| Swedish Albums (Sverigetopplistan) | 24 |
| Swiss Albums (Schweizer Hitparade) | 13 |
| UK Albums (Official Charts) | 78 |
