= It's a Jungle =

EP by Three Dog Night
- Released: May 1983
- Genre: Rock
- Length: 16:31
- Label: Passport
- Producer: Richard Podolor

Three Dog Night chronology
The Best of 3 Dog Night (1982)	It's a Jungle (1983)	Celebrate: The Three Dog Night Story, 1965–1975 (1993)

Singles from It's a Jungle
- 1. "It's a Jungle Out There" Released: 1983

It's a Jungle is an extended play (EP) by American rock band Three Dog Night, released in 1983.

== Track listing ==
Side One
No.	Title	Writer(s)	Length
1.	"It's a Jungle Out There"	Bill Moloney, Paul Pilger, Dennis Polen	3:35
2.	"Shot In the Dark"	Barry De Vorzon, Micheal Towers	3:10
3.	"Livin' It Up"	Bill LaBounty, Barry Mann, Cynthia Weil	3:30

Side Two
No.	Title	Writer(s)	Length
1.	"I Can't Help It"	Mark Anthony	3:05
2.	"Somebody's Gonna Get Hurt"	Charlie Black, Richard Feldman, Marcy Levy	3:11

== Personnel ==
- Mike Allsup – guitar
- Jimmy Greenspoon – keyboards
- Richard Grossman – bass
- Danny Hutton – vocals
- Chuck Negron – vocals
- Floyd Sneed – drums
- Cory Wells – vocals

=== Session players ===
- Bruce Gowdy – guitar
- Tris Imboden – drums
- Mark Leonard – bass
- Jay Gruska – keyboards
- Greg Hilfman – keyboards
- Duane Hitchings – synthesizer

== Production ==
- Producer: Richard Podolor

== Music videos ==
A music video was released accompanying the single off the album, "It's a Jungle Out There". Although the exact meaning is disputed, it shows an attractive woman in a "watering hole" being flirted with by the band's three lead vocalists and other bystanders. After the woman has had enough, she goes on dates with the singers and a bystander, then vanishes into thin air while on the date, tricking them into thinking she was actually in love with each, when in reality, it was only a plot to get rid of them. The video ends with a shot of her sitting alone in the "watering hole", having tricked and scared off every man who was interested in her.

The video was released on the Stet recording label and received "Light" and "Medium" screenplay.

Another video was recorded for "Shot in the Dark", directed by David Minasian. Although never commercially released, it was filmed on the set of the television program Fantasy Island, and on the streets of Beverly Hills, California.

== Charts ==
The album failed to sell to its full potential due to its label, Passport, going bankrupt. However, it sold a certified 60,000 copies, which rose over time to an estimated total of 200,000 to 300,000 copies.

Album

Chart (1983)	Peak position
US Billboard 200	210

Singles

Year	Single	Chart	Position
1983	"It's a Jungle Out There"	Radio & Records AOR Hot Tracks	65
