= Goodbye to the Island =

Studio album by Bonnie Tyler
- Released: January 1981
- Recorded: 1979–1980
- Studios: Rak Mobile; Startling Studios, Ascot, Berkshire
- Genre: Country rock
- Length: 42:02
- Label: RCA Victor
- Producers: Hugh Murphy; Ronnie Scott; Steve Wolfe

Bonnie Tyler chronology
Diamond Cut (1979)	Goodbye to the Island (1981)	Faster Than the Speed of Night (1983)

Singles from Goodbye to the Island
- 1. "I'm Just a Woman" Released: 3 October 1980; 2. "Goodbye to the Island" Released: 9 January 1981

Professional ratings
Review scores
Source	Rating
Allmusic	3/5 stars

Goodbye to the Island is the fourth studio album by Welsh singer Bonnie Tyler, issued in January 1981, her final album for RCA Records. Ronnie Scott and Steve Wolfe wrote the majority of songs for the album, and co-produced the record with Hugh Murphy.

Music critics described the album as "more upbeat" than her previous album Diamond Cut (1979). Goodbye to the Island had the weakest sales of all albums Tyler released through RCA, only charting in Norway at number 38.

== Release and promotion ==
Goodbye to the Island became Tyler's final album under RCA Records. It was released in January 1981 on vinyl and cassette. In 1991, Castle Communications issued the album on CD with an alternate artwork. The album was again reissued in 2010 by 7T's with two bonus tracks. Goodbye to the Island featured on the 2019 box set The RCA Years released by Cherry Pop with eight bonus tracks. This version of the album was released digitally in the United States and Canada in 2020.

=== Singles ===
"I'm Just a Woman" was released as the album's lead single in 1980 but it failed to chart.

"Goodbye to the Island" was released shortly before the album as its second and final single in January 1981, and it reached no. 54 on the UK Airplay Chart.

The album also featured re-recorded versions of "I Believe in Your Sweet Love" and "Sitting on the Edge of the Ocean" released in 1979.

== Track listing ==
All tracks produced by Hugh Murphy, Ronnie Scott and Steve Wolfe, except "I'm Just a Woman" and "We Danced on the Ceiling" produced by Hugh Murphy.

Side A
No.	Title	Writer(s)	Length
1.	"I'm Just a Woman"	Ronnie Scott; Steve Wolfe	5:08
2.	"We Danced on the Ceiling"	Scott; Wolfe	4:58
3.	"Wild Love"	Iain Sutherland	3:51
4.	"The Closer You Get"	Chris Rea	3:51
5.	"Sometimes When We Touch"	Dan Hill; Barry Mann	4:19
Total length:			42:02

Side B
No.	Title	Writer(s)	Length
6.	"Goodbye to the Island"	Scott; Wolfe	3:13
7.	"Wild Side of Life"	Arlie Carter; William Warren	3:46
8.	"A Whiter Shade of Pale"	Gary Brooker; Keith Reid	4:29
9.	"Sitting on the Edge of the Ocean"	Scott; Wolfe	3:19
10.	"I Believe in Your Sweet Love"	Scott; Wolfe	4:22

CD/ digital re-issue bonus tracks
No.	Title	Length
11.	"Come On, Give Me Your Lovin'"	3:18
12.	"Get Out of My Head"	4:14
13.	"Sitting on the Edge of the Ocean" (single version)	2:56
14.	"Sola a la Orilla del Mar"	3:24
15.	"I'm Just a Woman" (single version)	3:50
16.	"Sitting on the Edge of the Ocean" (alternate version)	3:30

== Personnel ==
- Bonnie Tyler - vocals
- Garth Watt-Roy, Gary Taylor, Robert Ahwai, Steve Lipson - guitar
- Felix Krish, Kevin Dunne - bass
- Betsy Cook, Mike McNaught - keyboards
- Jeff Allen, Liam Genockey - drums
- Raphael Ravenscroft - saxophone
- Betsy Cook, John Cameron, Mike McNaught, Wil Malone - arrangements

Technical

- Douglas Hopkins, Gregg Jackman, Steve Lipson - engineer
- Andrew Christian - art direction
- Chris Thomson - cover photography

== Charts ==
Chart (1981)	Peak position
Norwegian Albums (VG-lista)	38

== Release history ==
Country	Date	Format(s)	Label	Ref.
Europe	1981	Vinyl	RCA	
United States	1981	Vinyl	Chrysalis	
Europe	1991	CD	Castle Classics	
United Kingdom	2010	CD	7T's	
United States, Canada	17 April 2012	Digital download	Rdeg	
United States, Canada	2020	Digital download	Soundbarrier	
