= My Guns Are Loaded =

Single by Bonnie Tyler

from the album Diamond Cut
- B-side: "The Eyes Of A Fool" (Germany); "Baby I Just Love You" (US & France)
- Released: February 1979 (US); 16 March 1979 (UK)
- Genre: Country
- Length: 3:42
- Label: RCA Records
- Songwriters: Ronnie Scott & Steve Wolfe
- Producers: Ronnie Scott, Steve Wolfe & Robin Geoffrey Cable

Bonnie Tyler singles chronology
"Louisiana Rain" (1979)	"My Guns Are Loaded" (1979)	"Too Good to Last" (1979)

"My Guns Are Loaded" is a song recorded by Welsh singer Bonnie Tyler for her third studio album, Diamond Cut (1979). It was written by Ronnie Scott and Steve Wolfe, who also produced the song with Robin Geoffrey Cable.

The song was a major hit in Canada and France, and a minor hit in the US.

== Track listing and formats ==
US & France 7" single

1. "My Guns Are Loaded" — 3:45
2. "Baby I Just Love You" — 3:03

Germany 7" single

1. "My Guns Are Loaded" — 3:45
2. "The Eyes of a Fool" — 3:19

== Chart performance ==
Chart (1979)	Peak position
Canada (RPM Adult Contemporary)	10
Finland The Official Finnish Charts	30
France (IFOP)	11
UK Airplay Charts Record Business.	33
US Hot Country Songs (Billboard)	86
US Bubbling Under Hot 100 (Billboard)	7
US Top 100 Country (Cashbox)	83
US Country Singles (Record World)	85
US Top 150 Singles Charts (Record World)	141
