= The World Starts Tonight =

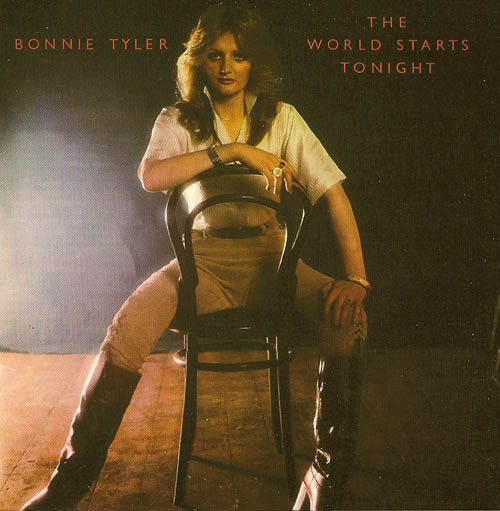

Studio album by Bonnie Tyler
- Released: 3 February 1977
- Recorded: 1976
- Genre: Pop
- Length: 37:02
- Label: RCA Victor
- Producers: Ronnie Scott; Steve Wolfe; David Mackay

Bonnie Tyler chronology
The World Starts Tonight (1977)	Natural Force (1978)

Singles from The World Starts Tonight
- 1. "Lost in France" Released: September 1976; 2. "More Than a Lover" Released: January 1977

The World Starts Tonight is the debut studio album by Welsh singer Bonnie Tyler, released in February 1977 by RCA Records. Most of the songs were written by Ronnie Scott and Steve Wolfe, who worked as her managers while she was signed to RCA. They also produced the album alongside David Mackay. Musically, the album features country and pop songs.

Two singles were released from the album. The first, "Lost in France", was certified silver by the BPI for sales of over 250,000 copies. "More Than a Lover" was also a hit, but failed to make progress in the UK Singles Chart after the BBC banned the song for its controversial lyrical content. Shortly after recording the album, Tyler had surgery to remove nodules from her vocal cords. The operation left Tyler with a permanently raspy voice.

The World Starts Tonight was received positively by contemporary critics, who praised Tyler for releasing a "promising debut". The album was hugely popular in Sweden, where it reached number two. Despite this, it failed to chart in any other country.

== Background ==
Bonnie Tyler (then known as Gaynor Hopkins) spent seven years performing in local pubs and clubs around South Wales between 1969 and 1976, first as part of Bobbie Wayne & the Dixies, and then with her own band Imagination. In 1975, she was discovered singing with Imagination by talent scout Roger Bell. She was invited to London to record two demos; "My! My! Honeycomb" and "Lost in France". After months passed, RCA Records contacted Tyler announcing that they would be releasing "My! My! Honeycomb" as a single in April 1976.

== Recording ==
Tyler recorded The World Starts Tonight in Morgan Studios and Roundhouse Recording Studios in London between 1975 and 1976. The session began with recording four demos; "My! My! Honeycomb", with its B-Side "Got So Used to Loving You", and "Lost in France", with its B-Side "Baby I Remember You". Ronnie Scott and Steve Wolfe wrote most of the songs from the album, and produced it with David Mackay.

== Critical reception ==
Professional ratings
Review scores
Source	Rating
AllMusic	4/5 stars

Tomas Mureika of AllMusic has retrospectively described The World Starts Tonight as "filled with promise and indications of great things to come". He called the album a "formidable debut" but that it only paved the way for her pairing with Jim Steinman in the 1980s. The Sydney Morning Herald gave a positive contemporary review, naming "Lost in France" the "stand-out track", whilst praising her cover of Janis Joplin's "Piece of My Heart".

== Commercial performance ==
On the week ending 10 March 1978, over a year since its release, The World Starts Tonight debuted at number thirteen on the Swedish Albums Chart. It reached its peak position at number two in the following week, remaining there for a total of three weeks. In the fifth running week on the chart, The World Starts Tonight fell to number six, replaced by Tyler's second studio album Natural Force. Following this, The World Starts Tonight slowly fell from the Swedish Albums Chart, after a total of eight weeks on the chart.

== Singles ==
"Lost in France" was released as the lead single from The World Starts Tonight in September 1976. The Sydney Morning Herald described the song as the "stand-out track" from the album. "Lost in France" became Tyler's first charting single, peaking at no. 9 in the UK. It was certified silver by the BPI for sales of over 250,000 copies.

"More Than a Lover" was released as the second single from The World Starts Tonight in January 1977. In December 1976, Tyler informed Record Mirror that her follow-up single to "Lost in France" would be "much more gutsy". Record Mirror described the song as "more meaty" than "Lost in France", but did not think the song was as commercial as its predecessor. Following a performance of the song on Top of the Pops, it was banned by the BBC due to "unsuitable lyrical content". The ban resulted in the song only reaching number 27 in the UK.

== Track listing ==
All tracks are written by Ronnie Scott and Steve Wolfe, except where noted.

Side A
No.	Title	Length
1.	"Got So Used to Loving You"	3:17
2.	"Love of a Rolling Stone" (Jerry Chesnut)	3:30
3.	"Lost in France"	3:59
4.	"Piece of My Heart" (Bert Berns, Jerry Ragovoy)	3:52
5.	"More Than a Lover"	3:52
Total length:		37:02

Side B
No.	Title	Length
6.	"Give Me Your Love"	3:15
7.	"The World Starts Tonight"	3:36
8.	"Here's Monday"	3:46
9.	"Love Tangle"	3:16
10.	"Let the Show Begin"	4:15

re-issue bonus tracks
No.	Title	Length
11.	"My! My! Honeycomb"	3:10
12.	"I've Got So Used to Loving You"	2:39
13.	"Baby I Remember You"	3:16

== Personnel ==
Credits are adapted from liner notes of The World Starts Tonight.

- Bonnie Tyler – vocals
- Terry Britten – guitar
- Dave Christopher – guitar
- Mo Foster – bass guitar
- Barry Guard – percussion
- Simon Phillips – drums
- Alan Tarney – bass guitar, guitar
- Steve Wolfe – guitar

Technical and production

- Dave Harris – assistant engineering
- Ashley Howe – engineering
- Andrew Hoy – production co-ordination
- David Mackay – arranging, engineering, producer
- George Nicholson – engineering
- Ronnie Scott – producer
- Simon Wakefield – assistant engineering
- Steve Wolfe – producer

== Charts ==
Chart (1978)	Peak position
Swedish Albums (Sverigetopplistan)	2

== Release history ==
Country	Date	Format(s)	Label	Ref.
Europe	1977	Vinyl	RCA	
United States	1977	Vinyl	Chrysalis	
Europe	1991	CD	Castle Classics	
United Kingdom	2009	CD; digital download	7T's	
United States	17 April 2012	Digital download	Rdeg	
