= Natural Force =

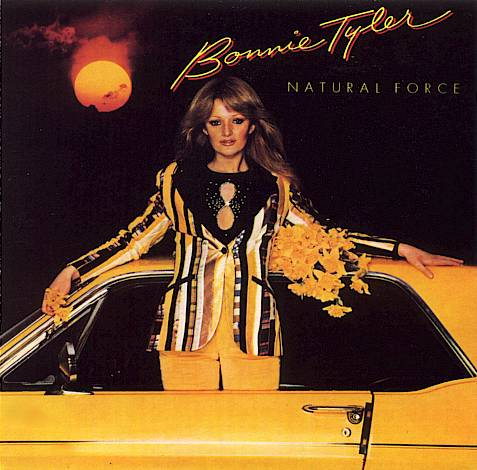

Studio album by Bonnie Tyler
- Released: 12 May 1978
- Recorded: 1977
- Studios: The Factory in Woldingham; Morgan Studios and IBC Studios in London
- Genre: Country rock
- Length: 38:18
- Label: RCA Victor
- Producers: David Mackay; Ronnie Scott; Steve Wolfe

Bonnie Tyler chronology
The World Starts Tonight (1977)	Natural Force (1978)	Diamond Cut (1979)

Alternative cover
- It's a Heartache – US edition cover

Singles from Natural Force
- 1. "Heaven" Released: July 1977; 2. "It's a Heartache" Released: November 1977; 3. "Here Am I" Released: April 1978; 4. "Hey Love (It's a Feelin')" Released: June 1978; 5. "If I Sing You a Love Song" Released: August 1978

Professional ratings
Review scores
Source	Rating
AllMusic	3.5/5 stars
Christgau's Record Guide	C

Natural Force is the second studio album by Welsh singer Bonnie Tyler, released in May 1978 by RCA Records. The album was issued in the United States under the title of It's a Heartache, with alternate cover art. As with her debut, Ronnie Scott and Steve Wolfe wrote most of the tracks on the album. David Mackay again produced the album, with Scott and Wolfe. Other songs include covers of American artists Stevie Wonder and Carole King.

Five singles were released from Natural Force. The second single, "It's a Heartache", is among the best-selling singles of all time, with sales of over 6 million copies. It became Tyler's first charting single in the United States, where it was certified gold by the Recording Industry Association of America (RIAA). Many other singles from Natural Force also fared well in Europe.

Natural Force became Tyler's most successful album for RCA. In the United States, it reached number 2 on the Top Country Albums chart, and number 16 on the Billboard 200. The album was also a success in Europe, but like its predecessor, it failed to chart in the United Kingdom.

== Background ==
Tyler began recording songs for Natural Force in 1977, which resulted in the release of "Heaven" following her debut album The World Starts Tonight in February of the same year. Natural Force sustained the style of its predecessor, with pop rock songs composed by Tyler's producers and managers, Ronnie Scott and Steve Wolfe, and the addition of a small number of covers. Natural Force became the best-selling of her four albums with RCA Records, with over 500,000 copies sold in the United States.

== Singles ==
"Heaven" was released as the album's lead single in July 1977. The song was criticised for having "less impact" than her previous singles. It was only a hit in Germany, where it reached number 24. Phil Hendricks of Cherry Red Records suggested that the death of Elvis Presley on 16 August 1977 may have been a contributing factor to the song's lack of success, due to the diversion of RCA's promotional capabilities.

"It's a Heartache" became the second single from Natural Force in November 1977. Tyler's raspy vocal quality had her compared to Rod Stewart, with critics viewing the song as superior to "Lost in France". "It's a Heartache" was a commercial success, selling over 6 million copies worldwide, establishing itself among of the best-selling singles of all time. The song became Tyler's first hit in the United States, reaching number three on the Billboard Hot 100. It also reached number four in the United Kingdom, and number one hit in countries such as Canada, France and Norway.

"Here Am I" was released as the third single from Natural Force on 7 April 1978. The song was not as commercially successful as "It's a Heartache", only charting in Germany and Norway. Record Mirror stated that the song lacked the "irresistible hook of "It's a Heartache"."

"Hey Love (It's a Feelin')" was released as the fourth single in June 1978, and failed to chart worldwide.

"If I Sing You a Love Song" was released as the fifth and final single from Natural Force in August 1978, and only reached number 103 on the Billboard Bubbling Under Hot 100.

== Track listing ==
All tracks are written by Ronnie Scott and Steve Wolfe, except where noted.

Side A
No.	Title	Length
1.	"It's a Heartache"	3:31
2.	"Blame Me"	4:02
3.	"Living for the City" (Stevie Wonder)	4:45
4.	"If I Sing You a Love Song"	4:45
5.	"Heaven"	3:04
Total length:		38:18

Side B
No.	Title	Length
6.	"Yesterday Dreams" (Brian Cadd)	4:08
7.	"Hey Love (It's a Feelin')"	3:55
8.	"(You Make Me Feel Like) A Natural Woman" (Gerry Goffin, Carole King, Jerry Wexler)	3:02
9.	"Here Am I"	3:47
10.	"Baby Goodnight" (Mike Heron)	4:15

re-issue bonus tracks
No.	Title	Length
11.	"Don't Stop the Music"	3:53
12.	"It's About Time"	3:34
13.	"Don't Stop the Music" (German 7" version)	3:44

== Personnel ==
- Bonnie Tyler - vocals
- Ray Taff Williams — guitar, background vocals
- Taff Williams — acoustic guitar, electric guitar, background vocals
- Steve Wolfe — acoustic guitar, electric guitar, background vocals
- Kevin Dunn — bass
- Roger Bara — keyboards
- Mike Gibbins — drums, percussion
- Peter King — background vocals
- David MacKay — engineer

== Charts ==
=== Weekly charts ===
Chart (1978)	Peak position
Australia (Kent Music Report)	60
Canada RPM (magazine)	5
Finnish Albums (Suomen virallinen lista)	1
Norwegian Albums (VG-lista)	3
Swedish Albums (Sverigetopplistan)	2
US Billboard 200	16
US Top Country Albums (Billboard)	2

=== Year-end charts ===
Chart (1978)	Position
Canada Top Albums/CDs (RPM)	61

== Certifications ==
Region	Certification	Certified units/sales
Canada (Music Canada)	Platinum	100,000^{^}
Finland (Musiikkituottajat)	Gold	25,000
United States (RIAA)	Gold	500,000^{^}
^{^} Shipments figures based on certification alone.

== Release history ==
Country	Date	Format(s)	Label	Ref.
Europe	1978	Vinyl	RCA	
United States	1978	Vinyl	Chrysalis	
Europe	1991	CD	Castle Classics	
United Kingdom	2009	CD; digital download	7T's	
United States	17 April 2012	Digital download	Rdeg	
