= Secret Dreams and Forbidden Fire =

Studio album by Bonnie Tyler
- Released: 7 April 1986
- Recorded: 1983–1986
- Genres: Pop; rock
- Length: 46:10 (vinyl); 54:48 (CD); 59:24 (cassette)
- Label: Columbia
- Producers: Roy Bittan; Larry Fast; John Jansen; John Rollo; Jim Steinman (exec.)

Bonnie Tyler chronology
Faster Than the Speed of Night (1983)	Secret Dreams and Forbidden Fire (1986)	The Greatest Hits (1986)

Singles from Secret Dreams and Forbidden Fire
- 1. "Holding Out for a Hero" Released: January 1984; 2. "Loving You's a Dirty Job but Somebody's Gotta Do It" Released: November 1985; 3. "If You Were a Woman (And I Was a Man)" Released: March 1986; 4. "Band of Gold" Released: May 1986; 5. "Rebel Without a Clue" Released: October 1986; 6. "No Way to Treat a Lady" Released: 1986 (NL/Canada); 7. "Lovers Again" Released: January 1987

Secret Dreams and Forbidden Fire is the sixth studio album by the Welsh singer Bonnie Tyler, released in April 1986 by CBS/Columbia Records. The album was executive-produced by Jim Steinman, who had produced Tyler's previous album, Faster Than the Speed of Night, which had been a major success. The album features collaborations with various songwriters and guest artists including Desmond Child and Todd Rundgren. Seven singles were released from the album in various territories, including "Holding Out for a Hero" which had originally been released in 1984 on the movie soundtrack album Footloose.

Secret Dreams and Forbidden Fire received generally mixed reviews, and was only a moderate commercial success in comparison to Faster Than the Speed of Night (which had been a UK number one and Top 5 in the US). It peaked at No. 24 on the UK Albums Chart, and missed the Top 100 altogether on the US Billboard chart, but was more successful in continental Europe and reached No. 1 on the Norwegian Albums Chart.

== Background and release ==
Bonnie Tyler and Jim Steinman had already seen international success with Faster Than the Speed of Night (1983) and its highest-charting single "Total Eclipse of the Heart". Steinman wrote four new songs for Secret Dreams and Forbidden Fire, two of which were released as singles. The first song to be released was "Holding Out for a Hero", released in 1984 for the Footloose soundtrack. The other, "Loving You's a Dirty Job but Somebody's Gotta Do It", was released as a collaborative single with Todd Rundgren in 1986.

Steinman recruited a number of other songwriters for the album, including Desmond Child. Steinman told Child that he wanted a song about androgyny. "I want a special song. The verses have to sound like Tina Turner, the B Section has to sound like The Police, U2, or Hall & Oates, and the chorus has to sound like Bruce Springsteen," he continued. Child used the verbal guide to write "If You Were a Woman (and I Was a Man)". He also wrote "Lovers Again".

"Ravishing" was originally written by Steinman as an instrumental track on the World Wrestling Federation compilation The Wrestling Album (1985), titled "Hulk Hogan's Theme". Tyler also recorded "Under Suspicion" during the album's recording. It was written by herself, her brother Paul Hopkins, and Peter Oxendale. The song was used as the B-side to "Loving You's a Dirty Job but Somebody's Gotta Do It".

Secret Dreams and Forbidden Fire was released on 7 April in the United States, 21 April in Japan, and May 1986 in Europe.

== Critical reception ==
Professional ratings
Review scores
Source	Rating
AllMusic	2/5 stars
Deseret News	3.5/5 stars
Kerrang!	4/5 stars

Secret Dreams and Forbidden Fire received generally mixed reviews from music critics, with much of the criticism being aimed at music producer and hit songwriter Jim Steinman. Steven Wine primarily had criticism toward the length of the tracks, stating that "only Bonnie Tyler's parents would want to listen to her sing the same song for six minutes, but three of the eight tunes on [the album] exceed that span." He went on to describe the album as a "bombastic bore", only complimenting one of Steinman's penned songs, "Ravishing". Tom Ford of Toledo Blade stated that "although Tyler proves able to do some interesting things, she is outdistanced by the tiresome ponderousness of the material," concluding that "the prissy, self-indulgence here is just too much to stand." Paul Speelman of The Age opined that Tyler and Steinman were "deeply entrenched in a rut", and found the music to be excessive. "There are banks of synthesizers, layers of percussion, dramatic electronic gimmickry and huge production: no wonder poor old Bonnie had to yell to be heard above that lot," he said, praising Tyler's voice. "The fact that she manages to salvage at least a few tracks attests to her vocal fortitude." He argued that the album was a case of over-indulgence, noting the eight minute and thirty-five second length of "Rebel Without a Clue".

The album did receive some positive reviews as well. Jerry Spangler of Deseret News described the album as "a fine collection of tunes with good musical variety and a lot of energy." Doug Stone of AllMusic retrospectively stated that the album "depicts a cool portrait of '80s pomposity", but argued that with the album lacking songs like "Faster Than the Speed of Night" and "Total Eclipse of the Heart" from her previous album, Secret Dreams and Forbidden Fire becomes substandard to Faster Than the Speed of Night. David Hiltbrand of People complimented Bonnie Tyler's voice stating that "Tyler's bluesy roar has enough texture to take the gloss off Steinman's heavy pop arrangements", and "Tyler sings only in capital letters and Jim Steinman produces only at a full gallop pace!"

== Singles ==
The album's lead single, "Holding Out for a Hero", had already been released in 1984 as a track on the movie soundtrack album for the film Footloose. Following its initial release, it charted highest in Austria, Canada, Germany and Sweden, peaking at No. 19 in each country, but only No. 96 on the United Kingdom singles chart. The song was re-released in 1985 and charted at No. 1 in Ireland and No. 2 in the United Kingdom, where it was certified Silver by the BPI for sales of over 250,000 units.

In 1984, Tyler was recruited by Giorgio Moroder to record "Here She Comes" for the 1984 restoration version of the 1927 German film Metropolis. Following this, "Loving You's a Dirty Job but Somebody's Gotta Do It", a duet with Todd Rundgren, was released as the second single from Secret Dreams and Forbidden Fire; it could not follow the success of "Holding Out for a Hero" or "Here She Comes", but made the Top 10 in Portugal and the Top 40 in Switzerland, France and Belgium.

"If You Were a Woman (And I Was a Man)" was released as the third single in 1986. It was most successful in France, where it peaked at No. 6 and was certified Silver by the SNEP for sales of over 250,000 units. "Band of Gold" was released as the fourth single from the album, and the last to chart, reaching No. 81 in the United Kingdom. The last three single releases – "No Way to Treat a Lady", "Rebel Without a Clue", and "Lovers Again" – failed to chart worldwide.

== Track listing ==
Side A Secret Dreams and Forbidden Fire — Vinyl edition
No.	Title	Writer(s)	Length
1.	"Ravishing"	Jim Steinman	6:20
2.	"If You Were a Woman (And I Was a Man)"	Desmond Child	4:46
3.	"Loving You's a Dirty Job but Somebody's Gotta Do It" (with Todd Rundgren)	Steinman	7:28
4.	"No Way to Treat a Lady"	Bryan Adams; Jim Vallance	4:23
Total length:			46:10

Side B
No.	Title	Writer(s)	Length
5.	"Band of Gold"	Edyth Wayne; Ronald Dunbar	5:40
6.	"Rebel Without a Clue"	Steinman	8:30
7.	"Lovers Again"	Child	4:13
8.	"Holding Out for a Hero"	Steinman; Dean Pitchford	4:50

Secret Dreams and Forbidden Fire — CD edition
No.	Title	Writer(s)	Length
1.	"Ravishing"	Steinman	6:24
2.	"If You Were a Woman (And I Was a Man)"	Child	5:15
3.	"Loving You's a Dirty Job but Somebody's Gotta Do It" (with Todd Rundgren)	Steinman	7:47
4.	"No Way to Treat a Lady"	Adams; Vallance	5:17
5.	"Band of Gold"	Wayne; Dunbar	5:49
6.	"Rebel Without a Clue"	Steinman	8:35
7.	"Lovers Again"	Child	4:32
8.	"Before This Night Is Through"	Beppe Cantarelli; Adrienne Anderson	5:21
9.	"Holding Out for a Hero"	Steinman; Pitchford	5:48
Total length:			54:48

Secret Dreams and Forbidden Fire — Cassette edition
No.	Title	Writer(s)	Length
1.	"Ravishing"	Steinman	6:24
2.	"If You Were a Woman (And I Was a Man)"	Child	5:16
3.	"Loving You's a Dirty Job but Somebody's Gotta Do It" (with Todd Rundgren)	Steinman	7:49
4.	"No Way to Treat a Lady"	Adams; Vallance	5:17
5.	"Before This Night Is Through"	Cantarelli; Anderson	5:21
6.	"Band of Gold"	Wayne; Dunbar	5:49
7.	"Rebel Without a Clue"	Steinman	8:35
8.	"Lovers Again"	Child	4:34
9.	"Under Suspicion"	Paul Hopkins; Peter Oxendale; Bonnie Tyler	4:19
10.	"Holding Out for a Hero"	Steinman; Pitchford	5:50
Total length:			59:24

== Credits and personnel ==
Credits adapted from AllMusic:

Technical and production

- Larry Alexander – mixing
- Nelson Ayres – assistant engineer
- Roy Bittan – arrangement, associate producer
- Greg Calbi – mastering
- Rory Dodd – arrangement, vocal arrangement
- Neil Dorfsman – mixing
- Greg Edward – mixing
- Larry Fast – associate producer, programming
- Ellen Foley – vocal arrangement
- John Jansen – associate producer, mastering consultant
- Don Ketteler – production coordination
- Tom "Bones" Malone – horn arrangement
- Sir Arthur Payson – mixing
- Steve Rinkoff – engineering
- John Rollo – associate producer, engineering
- Todd Rundgren – vocal arrangement
- John Philip Shenale – producer
- Joe Stefko – drum programming
- Jim Steinman – arrangement, direction, producer
- Eric Troyer – vocal arrangement

Instruments

- Roy Bittan – piano, synthesizer
- Jimmy Bralower – drums, percussion
- Michael Brecker – tenor saxophone
- Hiram Bullock – guitar
- Steve Buslowe – bass guitar
- Larry Fast – synthesizer
- Tom "Bones" Malone – trombone
- Eddie Martinez – guitar
- Sid McGinnis – guitar
- Lenny Pickett – saxophone
- Jim Pugh – trombone
- Alan Rubin – trumpet
- John Philip Shenale – synthesizer
- Sterling Smith – drums, piano, synthesizer
- Lew Soloff – trumpet
- David Taylor – bass trombone
- Max Weinberg – drums
- Art Wood – drums

Visuals and imagery

- Bob Carlos Clarke – concept, photography
- Rick Haylor – hair stylist
- Roslav Szaybo – designing

Vocals

- Bonnie Tyler – vocal
- Tawatha Agee – background vocal
- Rory Dodd – background vocal
- Curtis King – background vocal
- Cindy Mizelle – background vocal
- Todd Rundgren – featured artist, background vocal
- Holly Sherwood – background vocal
- Eric Troyer – background vocal

== Charts ==
=== Weekly charts ===
Chart (1986)	Peak position
Austrian Albums (Ö3 Austria)	23
Canada RPM Top Albums (RPM)	94
European Top 100 Albums (Music & Media)	17
Finnish Albums (Suomen virallinen lista)	3
German Albums (Offizielle Top 100)	24
New Zealand Albums (RMNZ)	45
Norwegian Albums (VG-lista)	1
Swedish Albums (Sverigetopplistan)	6
Swiss Albums (Schweizer Hitparade)	3
UK Albums (Official Charts)	24
US Billboard 200	106
US Cashbox (magazine)	90

=== Year-end charts ===
Chart (1986)	Position
Eurocharts European Top 100 Albums	66

== Certifications and sales ==
Region	Certification	Certified units/sales
France (SNEP)	Gold	100,000^{*}
^{*} Sales figures based on certification alone.

== Release history ==
Release history
Region	Date	Format(s)	Label	Ref.
United States	7 April 1986	vinyl LP	Columbia	
Japan	21 April 1986	vinyl LP	Epic	
