= Faster Than the Speed of Night (song) =

Single by Bonnie Tyler

from the album Faster Than the Speed of Night
- B-side: "Gonna Get Better"
- Released: April 1983
- Genre: Rock
- Length: 6:45 (album version); 4:42 (single version)
- Label: Columbia
- Songwriter: Jim Steinman
- Producers: Steinman; Jon Jansen

Bonnie Tyler singles chronology
"Total Eclipse of the Heart" (1983)	"Faster Than the Speed of Night" (1983)	"Have You Ever Seen the Rain?" (1983)

Music video
- "Faster Than the Speed of Night" on YouTube

"Faster Than the Speed of Night" is a song by Welsh singer Bonnie Tyler and is the second track from her fourth studio album of the same name (1983). It was written and produced by Jim Steinman and released by Columbia Records in 1983. As the second single from Faster Than the Speed of Night, it was the follow-up to "Total Eclipse of the Heart".

== Music video ==
The music video for "Faster Than the Speed of Night" was filmed at Waverly Abbey located in Tilford, England. Tyler's video for "Have You Ever Seen the Rain?" was filmed nearby, at the grounds of Waverley Abbey House.

=== Synopsis ===
The video opens with Tyler taking a young muscular man to a fantasy video game arcade where they proceed to kiss passionately. The video game titles influence the subsequent fantasy sequences. The man dances energetically in black dance underwear while swinging an electric guitar. Tyler is openly desirous of the "pretty boy"...who's "gotta move faster than the speed of night." Cued by various video game titles, the dancers start fighting using the guitars as swords and jousting on motorcycles. Throughout these scenes are shots of Tyler amongst Gothic ruins as she sings about the man pleasing her and she him. The video ends with the arcade manager kicking Tyler and the boy out of the arcade.

== Track listing ==
7" single

1. "Faster Than the Speed of Night" — 3:30
2. "Gonna Get Better" — 3:06

== Charts ==
Chart (1983)	Peak position
Ireland (IRMA)	17
Norway (VG-lista)	9
UK Singles (Official Charts)	43
