= Faster Than the Speed of Night =

Studio album by Bonnie Tyler
- Released: April 1983 (United Kingdom); September 1983 (United States)
- Recorded: 1982
- Studios: Power Station, New York City; Greene Street, New York City; Right Track Studios, New York City
- Genre: Rock
- Length: 43:14
- Label: Columbia
- Producers: Jim Steinman; John Jansen

Bonnie Tyler chronology
Goodbye to the Island (1981)	Faster Than the Speed of Night (1983)	Secret Dreams and Forbidden Fire (1986)

Singles from Faster Than the Speed of Night
- 1. "Total Eclipse of the Heart" Released: 11 February 1983 (UK); 2. "Faster Than the Speed of Night" Released: April 1983 (UK); 3. "Have You Ever Seen the Rain?" Released: 17 June 1983; 4. "It's a Jungle Out There" Released: July 1983 (Japan); 5. "Straight from the Heart" Released: 11 August 1983; 6. "Take Me Back" Released: November 1983 (US); 7. "Getting So Excited" Released: 27 February 1984 (UK)

Professional ratings
Review scores
Source	Rating
AllMusic	4.5/5 stars

Faster Than the Speed of Night is the fifth studio album by Welsh singer Bonnie Tyler. It was released in Europe on 8 April 1983 and later that year in the US through Columbia Records.

After releasing four albums on RCA, Tyler signed with CBS Records and changed musical direction. Soon after, she began working with Jim Steinman who produced the album and wrote its most successful single "Total Eclipse of the Heart".

Faster Than the Speed of Night entered the UK Albums Chart at No. 1, and was certified silver in the UK, platinum in the US, and double platinum in Canada.

On initial U.S. editions, the sleeve photo does not include the beam of light going through Tyler's head.

== Content ==
The album contains six dramatically re-worked cover songs, produced in the model of Phil Spector's Wall of Sound, including the Creedence Clearwater Revival hit "Have You Ever Seen the Rain?". "Goin' Through the Motions" is a cover of the song by Blue Öyster Cult from their 1977 album Spectres, while "Straight from the Heart" was the break-out Top 10 hit for Canadian rock singer/songwriter Bryan Adams from his platinum album Cuts Like a Knife. "Getting So Excited" was a cover of a song by British singer Lee Kosmin (with a short spoken interlude recited by Steinman inserted after the second verse: "I'd do anything for love, but I won't do that"). Another song, "Tears", was originally written and performed by Frankie Miller for his 1980 album Easy Money; for this album, Tyler performed the song as a duet with Miller. The sixth single, "Take Me Back", was written by Billy Cross and originally released by the Delta Cross Band in their 1981 album titled Up Front.

The album also includes three original songs produced in the same manner, two of which were written and composed by Steinman himself: the title track and the international No. 1 hit "Total Eclipse of the Heart". Additionally, this contains the initial recording of "It's a Jungle Out There", written by Dennis Polen, Paul Pilger, and William Moloney, which was picked up and re-recorded (in a shorter version) by the band Three Dog Night for their 1983 EP It's a Jungle.

== Track listing ==
Side A
No.	Title	Writer(s)	Length
1.	"Have You Ever Seen the Rain?"	John Fogerty	4:08
2.	"Faster Than the Speed of Night"	Jim Steinman	6:44
3.	"Getting So Excited"	Alan Gruner	3:33
4.	"Total Eclipse of the Heart"	Jim Steinman	6:57

Side B
No.	Title	Writer(s)	Length
5.	"It's a Jungle Out There"	Dennis Polen; Paul Pilger; William Moloney	4:39
6.	"Goin' Through the Motions"	Ian Hunter; Eric Bloom	4:09
7.	"Tears" (with Frankie Miller)	Frankie Miller	3:51
8.	"Take Me Back"	Billy Cross	5:24
9.	"Straight from the Heart"	Bryan Adams; Eric Kagna	3:42
Total length:			43:14

== Personnel ==
=== Musicians ===
- Bonnie Tyler – lead & backing vocals
- Roy Bittan – piano, organ on track 8
- Larry Fast – synthesizers
- Rick Derringer – guitars
- Steve Buslowe – bass
- Max Weinberg – drums
- Jimmy Maelen – percussion
- Eric Troyer – backing vocals
- Holly Sherwood – backing vocals on track 4
- Rory Dodd – backing vocals, vocal on track 4

=== "It's a Jungle Out There" ===
- Paul Shaffer – organ (also organ on track 7)
- Hiram Bullock – guitars
- Will Lee – bass guitar
- Steve Jordan – drums
- Jimmy Maelen – percussion

=== Additional musicians ===
- Dave LeBolt – additional synthesizer on track 1
- Steve Margoshes – all keyboards on track 2
- Holly Sherwood – backing vocals & wailing on track 2
- Martin Briley – additional guitars on track 2
- Stephanie Black, Erika Katz, Brian Pew, Edward Skylar, Tristine Skylar, David Varga – children's chorus on track 6
- Frankie Miller – male vocal on track 7

=== Production ===
- Produced & directed by Jim Steinman; associate producer: John Jansen
- Arranged by Roy Bittan & Jim Steinman, except track 2 (arranged by Steve Margoshes & Jim Steinman)
- Recording engineers: Neil Dorfsman (basic track recording), Rod Hui; chief recording engineer: John Jansen
- Additional recording by Frank Filipetti & Scott Litt
  - Recorded at The Power Station, Greene Street Studio, Right Track Studios
- Mixed by Neil Dorfsman, John Jansen & Jim Steinman, except track 2 (mixed by John Jansen, Scott Litt & Jim Steinman)
  - Mixed at The Power Station
- Mastered by Greg Calbi at Sterling Sound

== Charts ==
=== Weekly charts ===
Chart (1983)	Peak position
Australian Albums (Kent Music Report)	3
Canada Top Albums/CDs (RPM)	7
Dutch Albums (Album Top 100)	23
Finnish Albums (Suomen virallinen lista)	17
French Albums (SNEP)	12
German Albums (Offizielle Top 100)	20
New Zealand Albums (RMNZ)	1
Norwegian Albums (VG-lista)	1
Swedish Albums (Sverigetopplistan)	3
Swiss Albums (Schweizer Hitparade)	19
UK Albums (Official Charts)	1
US Billboard 200	4
US Cashbox (magazine)	3

=== Year-end charts ===
Chart (1983)	Position
Canada Top Albums/CDs (RPM)	33
New Zealand Albums (RMNZ)	25
US Billboard Top Pop Albums Female Artists	23
US Cashbox Top 100 Albums Artists	23

== Certifications and sales ==
Region	Certification	Certified units/sales
Canada (Music Canada)	2× Platinum	200,000^{^}
France (SNEP)	Gold	100,000^{*}
Hong Kong (IFPI Hong Kong)	Gold	10,000^{*}
New Zealand (RMNZ)	Gold	7,500^{^}
Norway (IFPI Norway)	Gold	25,000^{*}
Sweden (GLF)	Platinum	100,000^{^}
United Kingdom (BPI)	Silver	60,000^{^}
United States (RIAA)	Platinum	1,000,000^{^}
Summaries
Worldwide	—	3,000,000
^{*} Sales figures based on certification alone.^{^} Shipments figures based on certification alone.
