= More Than a Lover =

Single by Bonnie Tyler

from the album The World Starts Tonight
- B-side: "Love Tangle"
- Released: January 1977
- Genre: Country rock
- Length: 4:16
- Label: RCA Records
- Songwriter(s): Ronnie Scott & Steve Wolfe
- Producer(s): David Mackay

Bonnie Tyler singles chronology
"Lost in France" (1976)	"More Than a Lover" (1977)	"Heaven" (1977)

"More Than a Lover" is a song recorded by Welsh singer Bonnie Tyler from her debut studio album The World Starts Tonight (1977). It was released by RCA Records in January 1977, shortly before the release of the album, and was written by her at-the-time producers Ronnie Scott and Steve Wolfe.

The song was Tyler's third single in her career and second charting single, following "Lost in France" (1976). Its highest chart placing was number 7 in South Africa, and it also made the UK Top 30. Music critics praised Tyler for recording a song that could be seen as controversial.

== Background and release ==
Tyler's previous hit single "Lost in France" became a European hit single, and was due to be released in the United States when "More Than a Lover" was due for a European release. In December 1976, Tyler informed Record Mirror that her follow-up single to "Lost in France" would be "much more gutsy". The World Starts Tonight was aimed at a February/March release in 1977, and "More Than a Lover" was released one month ahead of the album.

== Critical reception ==
Record Mirror described the song as "more meaty" than "Lost in France", but didn't think the song was as commercial as its predecessor. Similarly, The Sun Herald described the song as the "next most commercial song to "Lost in France"."

== Live performances ==
Tyler performed "More Than a Lover" live on Top of the Pops on 31 March 1977.

== Chart performance ==
The song progressed slowly in the charts; it was released in January 1977, but it took until March for the single to reach the UK Top 50. Further success was hampered when the BBC banned the song from being played on any associated music programs due to a BBC producer's view that the song contained sexual innuendos. Its highest UK chart placing was number 27, though it was a top 10 in South Africa.

== Charts ==
Chart (1977)	Peak position
South Africa (Springbok Radio)	7
UK Singles (OCC)	27
West Germany (GfK)	44

== Track listings ==
7" single

1. "More Than a Lover" – 4:25
2. "Love Tangle" – 3:15
