= Lost in France =

- Cover of the German single

Single by Bonnie Tyler

from the album The World Starts Tonight
- B-side: "Baby I Remember You"
- Released: September 1976
- Genre: Pop
- Length: 4:03
- Label: RCA Victor
- Songwriters: Ronnie Scott; Steve Wolfe
- Producers: David Mackay; Ronnie Scott; Steve Wolfe

Bonnie Tyler singles chronology
"My! My! Honeycomb" (1976)	"Lost in France" (1976)	"More Than a Lover" (1977)

"Lost in France" is a song recorded by Welsh singer Bonnie Tyler. It was released as a single in September 1976 by RCA Records, written by her producers and songwriters Ronnie Scott and Steve Wolfe. "Lost in France" was Tyler's second single and first chart hit in her career, which featured on her debut album The World Starts Tonight (1977). The lyrics depict Tyler in a daze due to love.

The song was praised by critics, though some preferred her follow-up single "More Than a Lover" for its controversial nature. "Lost in France" was a commercial success. It peaked highest at number two in South Africa, and was also a Top 20 hit in a further six countries.

== Background ==
Bonnie Tyler was spotted by talent scout Roger Bell in The Townsman Club, Swansea, singing the Ike & Tina Turner song "Nutbush City Limits" with her band Imagination in 1975. She was invited to London to record some demo tracks. After months had passed, Tyler received a phone call from RCA Records, offering her a recording contract. "My! My! Honeycomb" was to become her first single, released in April 1976. The song failed to chart, only receiving local airplay in Wales. In response to this, RCA increased their promotional efforts for the release of "Lost in France", arranging for Tyler to fly to a château in France to meet with a large number of journalists.

Soon after the song's release, Tyler underwent an operation to remove nodules from her vocal cords. She failed to follow the six-week rest period instructed by her doctor and was left with a permanent, distinct raspy quality.

== Recording ==
Tyler recorded four demos in London in 1975. "My! My! Honeycomb" was released as her first single with "Got So Used to Loving You" as its B-side, and "Lost in France" was released with "Baby I Remember You" as its B-side. David Mackay, Ronnie Scott and Steve Wolfe produced the songs. "Got So Used to Loving You" and "Lost in France" were later chosen to appear on her debut album The World Starts Tonight, which was released in February 1977.

== Composition ==
"Lost in France" is a country pop song with a length of three minutes and 54 seconds. It is set in common time and has a moderate tempo of 118 beats per minute. It is written in the key of B♭ major and Tyler's vocals span one octave and a semitone, from A_{3} to B♭_{4}.

== Music video ==
Tyler is seen singing as she walks through the gardens of the Château de Saint-Germain-de-Livet in Normandy, inside a cafe, and later singing from an upstairs window.

== Chart performance ==
On the week ending 30 October 1976, "Lost in France" entered the UK Singles Chart weeks after its initial release. Two weeks later, the song reached the Top 40, reaching number twenty-two. "Lost in France" continued to rise until it reached number nine on 27 November, maintaining the position for two weeks. The single gradually dropped following its peak, spending a total of ten weeks on the UK Singles Chart.

== Critical reception ==
The Sydney Morning Herald described the song as the "stand-out track" from The World Starts Tonight, naming it the "most commercial." Record Mirror favoured the follow-up single "More Than a Lover", though agreed "Lost in France" was the more commercial of the two.

== Live performances ==
Tyler's first television promotion for "Lost in France" took place on Top of the Pops on 4 November 1976.

Tyler performed "Lost in France" live in Zaragosa, Spain, in 2005. The performance was recorded and released on Tyler's album Bonnie Tyler Live (2006) and the accompanying DVD Bonnie on Tour (2006).

== Track listing ==
7" single

1. "Lost in France" — 4:03
2. "Baby I Remember You" — 3:19

== Charts ==
=== Weekly charts ===
Chart (1976–77)	Peak position
Australia (Kent Music Report)	18
Austria (Ö3 Austria Top 40)	12
Belgium (Ultratop 50 Flanders)	21
Belgium (Ultratip Bubbling Under Wallonia)	35
West Germany (GfK)	3
Netherlands (Dutch Top 40)	24
Netherlands (Dutch Single Top 100)	20
South Africa (Springbok Radio)	2
Sweden (Sverigetopplistan)	13
UK Singles (Official Charts)	9

2026 chart positions of "Holding Out for a Hero"
Chart (2026)	Peak position
UK Singles Downloads (Official Charts)	33
UK Singles Sales (Official Charts)	37

=== Year–end charts ===
Chart (1977)	Peak position
Australia (Kent Music Report)	77
Germany (Official German Charts)	8
South Africa (Springbok Radio)	20

== Cover versions ==
- Swedish dansband Wizex covered the song in 1977, featuring Kikki Danielsson on lead vocals. The song was later rereleased on Danielsson's 2001 compilation album Fri.
- Chris Conti recorded a dance version of "Lost in France" as a single, released in 1995.

== Personnel ==
Credits are adapted from liner notes of The World Starts Tonight.

Technical and production

- Dave Harris – assistant engineering
- Ashley Howe – engineering
- Andrew Hoy – production co-ordination
- David Mackay – arranging, engineering, producer
- George Nicholson – engineering
- Ronnie Scott – producer
- Simon Wakefield – assistant engineering
- Steve Wolfe – producer

Sounding

- Bonnie Tyler – vocal

On instruments

- Terry Britten – guitar
- Dave Christopher – guitar
- Kevin Dunne – bass guitar
- Barry Guard – percussion
- Simon Phillips – drums
- Alan Tarney – bass guitar, guitar
- Steve Wolfe – guitar
