= Ronnie Scott (songwriter) =

British songwriter and manager

Ronnie Scott was a British pop music promoter, group manager and songwriter; known primarily for hit songs co-written with Marty Wilde in the 1960s, and Steve Wolfe in the 1970s.

== With Marty Wilde ==
In 1966, Scott was working for The George Cooper Agency, whose artists roster included The Bystanders (who Scott also managed) and Marty Wilde. Scott wrote a number of songs, some on his own, but most co-written with Wilde, demos of which were recorded by The Bystanders. One solo effort "Royal Blue Summer Sunshine Day" (1967) and two joint efforts "Have I Offended The Girl" (1966) and "When Jesamine Goes" (published under the pseudonyms of Frere Manston and Jack Gellar) (1968) were issued as singles, but all failed. The Casuals covered the last song and issued it simply as "Jesamine", which reached No. 2 in the UK Singles Chart in late 1968.

Scott and Wilde songs were used by a wide range of musicians including Status Quo: "Ice in the Sun" "Elizabeth Dreams" and "Paradise Flat" (all on their first album Picturesque Matchstickable Messages from the Status Quo); Lulu "I'm a Tiger" (1968) and Wilde himself with "Abergavenny" (1968) (also credited to Manston and Gellar, and reissued by Wilde under the pseudonym "Shannon" in 1969)

Wilde and Scott also wrote the words and music to The Wednesday Play version of No Trams to Lime Street an Alun Owen play, broadcast on 18 March 1970.

When The Bystanders evolved into Man, Scott remained their manager, and they recorded up to three demo sessions a week for him, including "Down the Dustpipe" which Scott suggested to Status Quo when they asked for his help. Man left Scott's management in 1969.

== With Steve Wolfe ==
By 1976 Scott was working with Steve Wolfe as a songwriting and producing team, when they spotted Bonnie Tyler in "The Townsman Club" in Swansea, Wales, and they became Tyler's managers, songwriters, and producers.

Scott and Wolfe wrote eight out of the ten songs on Tyler's first album The World Starts Tonight (1977), which they also produced. The album included "Lost in France", which reached No. 9 on the UK Singles Chart, and "More Than a Lover" which reached No. 27.

Tyler's second album Natural Force (released as It's a Heartache in the US) (1978) included five Scott/Wolfe songs including the track "It's a Heartache" which reached No. 4 in the UK, and No. 3 on the Billboard Hot 100 in the United States, a Juice Newton cover charted in April 1978 . This song has since been covered by several different musicians, including Dave & Sugar, Trick Pony, and Rod Stewart.

Scott and Wolfe wrote eight of the ten songs on Tyler's Diamond Cut album (1979), and also six of the ten songs on her Goodbye to the Island album (1981), including "Sitting on the Edge of the Ocean", which won the "Grand Prix" at the 1979 World Popular Song Festival in Japan.

Bonnie Tyler did not renew her contract with Scott and Wolfe, since she perceived that they "were trying to take her further into country music".
