= The Whybirds =

UK musical group

- Origin: Bedford, Bedfordshire, England
- Genres: alt.country/rock music/Americana
- Years active: 2006–2017
- Label: The Little Red Recording Company
- Members: Dave Banks; Ben Haswell; Luke Tuchscherer; Nick Mailing
- Past members: Taff Thatcher
- Website: www.thewhybirds.com

The Whybirds were a rock/alt.country band from Bedford, England. They released three full-length studio albums as well as a live album and an EP.

== Biography ==
The Whybirds formed in 2006, composed of Dave Banks (vocals, guitar), Ben Haswell (vocals, guitar), Taff Thatcher (vocals, bass) and Luke Tuchscherer (vocals, drums). From its inception, the group has been notable for the fact that all members share lead vocal and songwriting duties, in a manner that has been compared to The Band.

The group met at school, where Haswell, Tuchscherer and Thatcher had originally played together in The View. The View disbanded in 2005 and the three joined with Banks to form The Whybirds a year later. However, Thatcher left The Whybirds in 2012 and Haswell moved from guitar to bass.

The band members cite their influences as Bruce Springsteen, Steve Earle, Neil Young, The Replacements, Uncle Tupelo, Ryan Adams, Pearl Jam and My Morning Jacket.

As for the band's name, Tuchscherer said in 2010: "It’s a reference to The Byrds. Their Sweetheart of the Rodeo is the definitive country rock album, and they obviously spelt their name with a ‘Y’. So essentially it’s a nod to them. However, in a 2008 interview the band said it was also a nod to The Yardbirds.

As well as The Band, The Whybirds have been compared to Bruce Springsteen, The Who, Tom Petty, Pearl Jam, The Allman Brothers, Neil Young (specifically with Crazy Horse), Alex Chilton and Warren Zevon among others.

The band played their farewell gig on 11 August 2017 at The Lexington in London – 10 years and one day after the release of their debut EP, Tonight.

== Recording career ==
=== Tonight EP & The Whybirds (2007–2008) ===
The band's first release was the Tonight EP in August 2007, followed by their self-titled debut album in March 2008. Both were produced by Nick Mailing – who produced The Quireboys' Well Oiled and Homewreckers & Heartbreakers records – at the same sessions in March/April 2007 at Lost Boys Studio in Cranfield, Bedfordshire. The Whybirds album was launched at The Barfly in Camden Town in March 2008 but received little press attention on release.

=== Cold Blue Sky, Live Recordings Vol. 1 and national press attention (2009–2011) ===
The Whybirds' sophomore album, Cold Blue Sky, was recorded with the help of Elliot Mazer, who produced Neil Young's Harvest and worked on recordings by The Byrds, The Band, Janis Joplin and Linda Ronstadt among others. Mazer worked on early sessions, but was unable to make it back from New York City when the album was being finished.

Cold Blue Sky was ultimately co-produced by the band and Tom Peters – whose credits include Matt Cardle, Cradle of Filth, Porcupine Tree and Bonzo Dog Doo-Dah Band – at Monkey Puzzle House in Woolpit, Suffolk in the summer of 2009.

The record was launched at a show at The Garage, London in Islington in November 2009, ahead of its official release in March 2010.

Cold Blue Sky was met with critical acclaim from the UK and European music press upon its release in 2010, with positive reviews from publications such as Classic Rock (7/10), Maverick Country (4/5) and R2 (Rock'n'Reel) (4/5), as well as other music websites such as Eurorock, Northern Sky, Power Metal (9/10) and Americana UK (7/10).

Eduardo Izquierdo, writing in Spanish magazine Ruta 66, said: "Beautiful melodies, rich instrumentation... Honesty, feeling, variety, essence... Nothing is superfluous and nothing is lacking. One of my albums of the year."

During 2010/11, The Whybirds toured Spain with the Drive-By Truckers, played festivals including Azkena Rock Festival, Secret Garden Party, Summer Sundae, Rhythms of the World, Off the Tracks and the Rhythm Festival and supported artists such as Evan Dando, The Quireboys, The Union, Jason & The Scorchers and Alejandro Escovedo.

In the Classic Rock Awards 2010, the magazine included "Jenny, Can We Take a Ride?" in their best songs of the year, calling the track a "slice of blinding blue-collar country rock from the Bruce Springsteens of Bedford".

In 2011, Rolling Stone called them one of the top 10 bands to watch.

The band's full length live album, Live Recordings Vol.1 – mixed by former Quireboy Chris Corney – was released in 2011 to good reviews.

The record features numerous segues and extended periods of improvisation – in a style reminiscent of a jam band – which have long been part of the band's shows. Indeed, like many other jam bands, The Whybirds have an open taping policy, and many of their concerts have been uploaded to the Live Music Archive for free download.

=== New lineup (2012) ===
Thatcher left the group in February 2012, citing "how fickle the music industry is" and him becoming "extremely disillusioned with the whole concept of trying to sell music" as contributing factors. True to that sentiment, Thatcher releases music completely free of charge under the name The Quaint & The Curious.

Following the split, The Whybirds took some time to "relearn how to be a band" and during this period, the group nearly disbanded entirely. Singer/drummer Luke Tuchscherer was quoted by Songwriting Magazine as saying: "When Taff left, the initial discussion was around getting another bassist. But we didn’t even get to the point of auditioning anyone, because we just thought they’d have to be a brilliant bass player and a brilliant singer, plus Taff was a great songwriter. That’s already pretty big shoes for anyone to fill. On top of that, the rest of us have been playing together for years and are best friends, so no-one would’ve wanted to come into the band. So there appeared to be no other option other than to quit, but then Ben said, ‘Why don’t I play bass?’ That saved the band really."

=== A Little Blood (2013) ===
Work on the follow-up to Cold Blue Sky began in early 2013 and the single "The Cure" was released on 2 September 2013.

The single "The Crow's Caw" was released on 21 October with an accompanying video before third studio album A Little Blood was officially released on 4 November 2013. The record was partly crowdfunded via Pledge Music.

A Little Blood was produced by Nick Mailing at Lost Boys Studio, Cranfield and Alexander Sound Studio in Milton Keynes and mixed by Tom Peters. The record saw The Whybirds going in a "meaner, darker, grittier" direction due to both the change in lineup and the mood within the band.

In a press release accompanying the album, Dave Banks was quoted as saying: "Everything good we thought would happen to us leading up to and after Cold Blue Sky just didn’t. The new record is about three guys crashing into their thirties, and realising it isn’t what they thought it would be. A lot of the characters in these songs don’t necessarily have a lot going for them. But for some of them, there is still a little hope."

Tuchscherer was quoted by Spiral Earth as saying: "The last one, Cold Blue Sky, had a very optimistic feel to it. We as a band were being promised the earth, we were younger, less jaded… This record, well, I think the things that happened to us between this one and the last – including losing a member – influenced the songs greatly. The record, to me, is about hitting your 30s, with the backdrop of maybe not having the best government, people struggling to get by, having dreams go unfilled…but still being alive. The song "A Little Blood" is talking about one thing, but for me, the album’s title is summed up by the penultimate track, where it says: 'They ain’t killed us yet, there’s a little blood to bleed'."

The album received positive reviews in the UK national press from publications including Uncut (7/10), Powerplay (7/10), Scottish Daily Express (4/5), R2 (Rock'n'Reel) (4/5), as well as websites such as Songwriting Magazine (5/5), Americana UK (7/10), Renacer Eléctrico Music Magazine, Fatea and Indie London (3.5/5). It received an average review from Maverick Country (3/5).

In a positive review in the February 2014 issue of Classic Rock, critic Philip Wilding said: "Critical acclaim can only carry a band so far. A case in point is the feverish plaudits that greeted The Whybirds' 2010 album Cold Blue Sky, with the band lauded as England's answer to the Allmans... This album is an exercise in realisation. Grittier, darker tones, downbeat lyrics. The writing’s on the wall. The band’s songwriting still shines through the fuzz, though – songs like 'Never Let You Go' and 'More Than He Could Stand' are brittle but beautiful. Their heads might be hung low, but their songs still resonate."

Classic Rock Society magazine wrote in its Jan/Feb 2014 issue that the record "...funnels Jayhawks Americana through the English power trio sound and gives us some hard, anthemic, big chorus, sing-along rock tracks. Driving rock that needs to be played loud. Remember the name, these guys are going to be huge."

The record placed at number seven in Americana UK's album chart.

Songwriting Magazine named "The Cure" as a runner up in its Best Rock Songs of 2013 list and the band as a whole as one of the most overlooked bands of the year, saying "we can't see why their records aren't flying off digital shelves".

In late 2013 it was announced that the band would be embarking on an eight-date tour of Spain in February 2014, which was well received by critics.

=== Solo efforts (2014-present) ===
In March 2014, Tuchscherer announced a Pledge Music campaign for his debut solo record. The album, You Get So Alone At Times That It Just Makes Sense, is named after a book by Charles Bukowski. Produced by Tom Peters, the record features Banks and Haswell from the band, as well as other guests including Max Hart (We Are Scientists, Katy Perry), Nick Mailing (The Quireboys), Chris Corney (The Quireboys) and Simon Rinaldo (Pearl Handled Revolver), with string arrangements by Bedford composer Johnny Parry. The album's official release was 6 October 2014.

When asked – in an interview with Spanish magazine Ruta 66 – why he needed to make a solo album, Tuchscherer said: "I don’t think I needed to, but basically, Tom Peters asked me at the end of 2010 whether I’d like to do some recording with him. I asked the others if they had a problem, no one said they did, so in January 2011 I went into the studio with Tom." He said that the album was recorded in a week or so, with the days spread out over two years.

To mark the release date, a video for the song "Hold On" was unveiled. Upon release, the album attracted universally positive reviews from a number of UK and European websites and magazines.

Tuchscherer said in an interview with Local Secrets that The Whybirds were "kicking songs around now for a new record. We’ve got about eight and plenty more to work on. The new stuff is sounding really good."

In July 2015, Tuchscherer announced he was launching a crowdfunding campaign for his second solo album, to be called Always Be True. In March 2017, it was announced that Tuchscherer had signed with Clubhouse Records and would be releasing Always Be True through the label on 2 June.

In February 2018, Tuchscherer released the Shadows EP, followed by his third full-length album, Pieces, in July.

An Americana UK article announced that Dave Banks would be recording a solo album in 2017. It was later announced that the album, called Until the End, would be released on 22 March 2019.

=== Hiatus (2017) ===
In April 2017, it was reported by Spanish magazine Ruta 66 that the band would be playing three final shows in the summer before going on indefinite hiatus.

Nick Mailing, who produced The Whybirds and A Little Blood, joined the band on bass and Ben Haswell moved back to guitar.

In an Americana UK news article, the band cited "life commitments" as the reason for the break, and said: "It’s been an amazing 11 years and has been a hell of a ride. We want to play these final gigs not only for ourselves, but for the people who have supported us for all this time. We won’t say that we’ll never play again, we love each other and this music too much, but there are no plans for the foreseeable future."

The shows – at Bedford Esquires on 30 June; The Portland Arms, Cambridge on 7 July; and The Lexington, London on 11 August – were well received by critics and fans.

Luke Tuchscherer said in an interview that he was relocating to New York City.

== Discography ==
Official Whybirds Discography
Title	Release details
Tonight	Released: 10 August 2007; Release type: EP; Label: The Little Red Recording Company; Formats: CD (discontinued), digital download
The Whybirds	Released: 10 March 2008; Release type: Album; Label: The Little Red Recording Company; Formats: CD, digital download
Cold Blue Sky	Released: 15 March 2010; Release type: Album; Label: The Little Red Recording Company; Formats: CD, digital download
Live Recordings Vol. 1	Released: 14 March 2011; Release type: live album; Label: The Little Red Recording Company; Formats: CD, digital download
The Cure	Released: 2 September 2013; Release type: Single; Label: The Little Red Recording Company; Formats: digital download
The Crow's Caw (Single Edit)	Released: 21 October 2013; Release type: Single; Label: The Little Red Recording Company; Formats: digital download
A Little Blood	Released: 4 November 2013; Release type: Album; Label: The Little Red Recording Company; Formats: CD, digital download
