= Blackball =

Blackball, black-ball, black ball, blackballed, or blackballing may refer to:

- Blackballing, a rejection in a traditional form of secret ballot

== Film ==
- Blackball (film), a 2003 film starring Paul Kaye
- Blackballed: The Bobby Dukes Story, a 2004 film starring Rob Corddry
- La bola negra, also known as The Black Ball, a 2026 film

== Games ==
- Blackball, a monster in the Mystara campaign setting of Advanced Dungeons & Dragons

== Music ==
- "Blackball" (The Offspring song), 1989
- "Blackball", a Christian Hard Rock/Alternative band
- "Blackball", a song by the industrial band KMFDM, on their 2003 album WWIII
- "Blackball", the second song on the 2008 Bigelf album Cheat the Gallows

== Sports ==
- The black ball in pocket billiards games including pool and snooker
- Blackball (pool), a variant of the pocket billiards game eight-ball
- Blackball, alternate name for Negro league baseball
- Blackball (surfing), a flag to show surfers that they must clear the water

== Other ==
- Blackball, New Zealand, a small town located on the western coast of the South Island of New Zealand
- Blackball Branch, a branch railway line to Blackball, New Zealand
- The Black Ball (gala), an annual fundraising dance for the Keep a Child Alive charity
- "Black ball", alternative name for Shade ball
- Black Ball: a round black shape hoisted at a ship's mast head, with various contextual meanings.
- "Blackballing", a form of male hazing ritual in which the victim's genitals are covered in black shoe polish. Common in British boarding schools and fraternities.

== See also ==
- Blackballed (disambiguation)
- Blacklisting, listing people, countries or other entities to be avoided or distrusted
- Black Ball Line (disambiguation), several shipping companies
