= Twisted Love =

Studio album by the Quireboys
- Released: 4 September 2016
- Recorded: 2015–2016
- Genre: Rock; blues rock
- Length: 40:44
- Label: Off Yer Rocka
- Producer: Martin Ekelund; Guy Griffin

The Quireboys chronology
St. Cecilia and the Gypsy Soul (2015)	Twisted Love (2016)	White Trash Blues (2017)

Singles from Twisted Love
- 1. "Twisted Love" Released: 2016

Twisted Love is the tenth studio album by English rock band the Quireboys, released in 2016.

== Recording ==
Twisted Love was the Quireboys' fourth studio album in three years, following Beautiful Curse (2013), Black Eyed Sons (2014), and St. Cecilia and the Gypsy Soul (2015). It features a re-recording of "Gracie B" from the band's previous album, reworked to match the heavier sound from their live shows. The album was noted for its strong blues rock influences. The album was recorded at Lemon Recording Studio in Klippan, Sweden, in May 2016.

== Release and promotion ==
"Twisted Love" was released as the album's lead single in July 2016. It peaked at no. 1 on the UK Physical Singles chart and no. 13 on the UK Vinyl Singles chart. The album was preceded by the release of the Twisted Love EP on 19 August 2016, which featured the album version, an extended version, and three bonus tracks.

== Critical reception ==
Professional ratings
Review scores
Source	Rating
Classic Rock	4/5 stars

Classic Rock opined that blues rock fits the band "like a glove", likening Twisted Love to the Rolling Stones' early 70s work.

== Track listing ==
All tracks are written by Spike and Guy Griffin, except where noted.

Twisted Love track listing
No.	Title	Writer(s)	Length
1.	"Torn and Frayed"		3:17
2.	"Ghost Train"		3:59
3.	"Killing Time"		3:53
4.	"Twisted Love"	Spike; Guy Griffin; Paul Guerin	4:12
5.	"Breaking Rocks"		4:16
6.	"Gracie B, Pt. 2"	Spike; Griffin; Guerin	4:17
7.	"Life's a Bitch"		2:57
8.	"Stroll On"		4:08
9.	"Shotgun Way"		4:41
10.	"Midnight Collective"	Spike; Griffin; Guerin	4:08

== Personnel ==
Credits adapted from liner notes.

Band members

- Jonathan "Spike" Gray – lead vocals
- Guy Griffin – lead guitar, rhythm guitar, backing vocals
- Paul Guerin – lead guitar, rhythm guitar, backing vocals
- Keith Weir – keyboards, backing vocals
- Dave McCluskey – drums
- Nick Malling – bass guitar

Additional musicians

- Lynne Jackaman – backing vocals
- Par Jansson - harmonica
- Jenny Palm – backing vocals
