= Twisted Love (disambiguation) =

Twisted Love is a 2016 album by the Quireboys, or the title song.

Twisted Love may also refer to:

- "Twisted Love", a song by ATB from Distant Earth, 2011
- "Twisted Love", a song by Ruben Studdard from Letters from Birmingham, 2012
- Twisted Love, a 1985 Hong Kong film featuring Charlie Cho
- Twisted Love, a 1995 film featuring Sasha Jenson and Soleil Moon Frye
- Twisted Love, a 2020 television series on Investigation Discovery
- Twisted Love, a 2021 romance novel by Ana Huang
