= Rhythms of the World =

British music festival

Rhythms of the World Festival
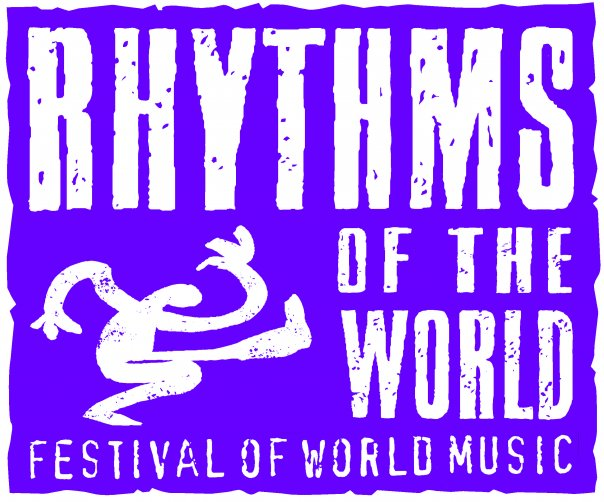
- The current ROTW logo
- Genre: World music
- Dates: July
- Locations: Priory Park, Hitchin, Hertfordshire, UK
- Years active: 1992 -Present
- Website: www.rotw.uk

Rhythms of the World (ROTW) was a British world music festival first organised in 1992. Acts performing included Get Cape. Wear Cape. Fly, Glen Matlock, the Swanvesta Social Club and Hugh Cornwell.

== Location ==
Rhythms of the World took place each July in the market town of Hitchin, Hertfordshire. The ROTW festival was made up of nearly 190 acts on 11 stages, plus 12 fringe venues (pubs and bars offering live music in partnership with ROTW) in 2006. It went on to include various workshops (music, art and otherwise), stalls and myriad other distractions.

It was announced on 2 October 2007 that Rhythms of the World would no longer be held in Hitchin town centre and that the organising committee are looking for a greenfield site on the outskirts of the town for future events.

On 11 February 2008 it was announced that the 2008 festival would take place in the grounds of Hitchin Priory.

== Funding ==
Festival organizers estimated the costs at around £200,000 in 2011. This cost is covered by support from North Hertfordshire District Council, other grants, and admission fees. Additionally, the festival uses volunteers extensively to minimise event expenses.

== History ==
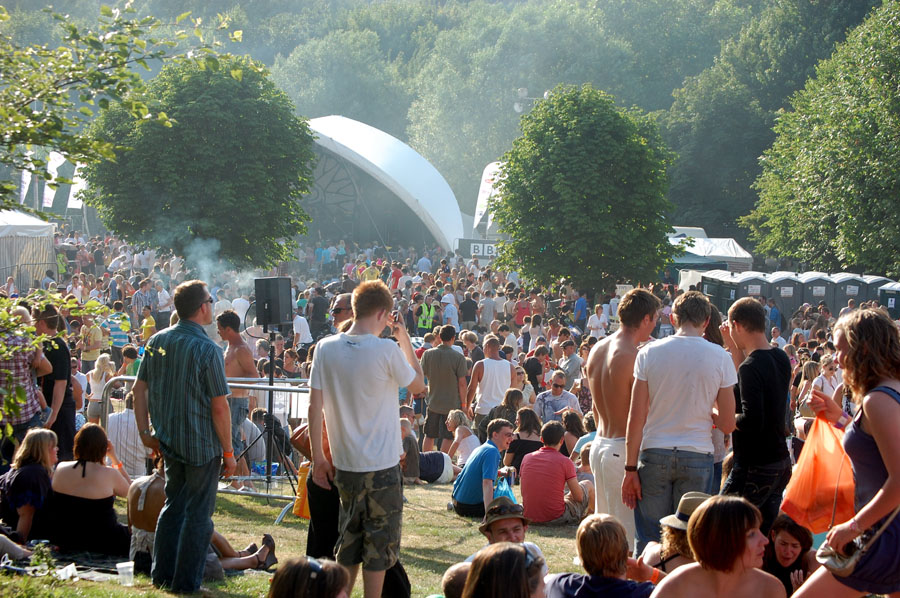
Festival in Priory Park from 2008–present

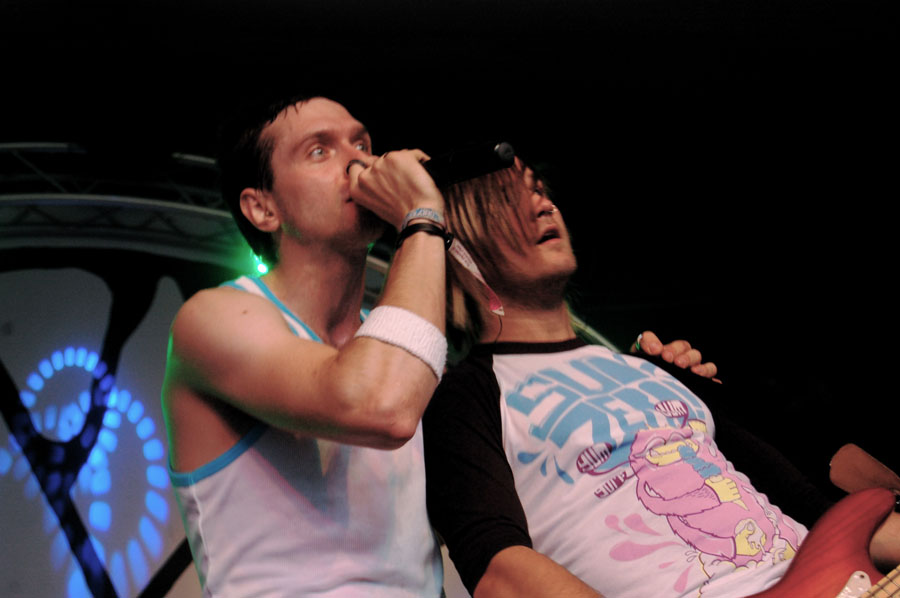
Exit Avenue - 2009

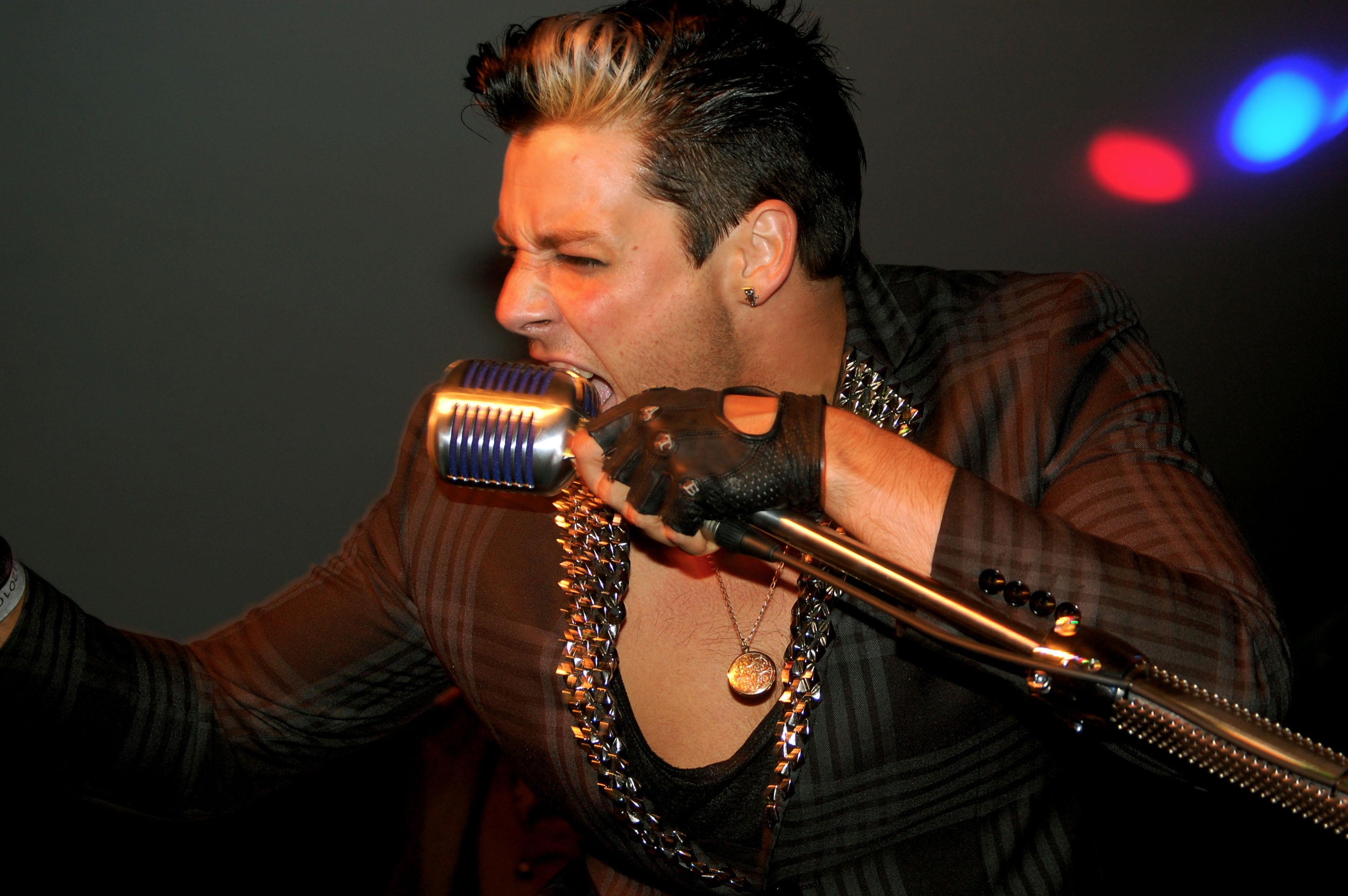
My Passion -2010

Rhythms of The World was started in 1992 by the Hitchin Oxfam Campaigns Group as a way of raising money for Oxfam and to highlight their international issues through world music. The first four years were staged in Hitchin Town Hall and featured bands such as the Bhundu Boys and King Salsa. In 1996 the event moved outside to the Market Place, but had only one stage and due in part to terrible weather the organisers felt the benefit to Oxfam was not being reflected in the increasing effort required. In 1998 the Campaigns Group ceased the Rhythms of The World project.

In 1999 a new committee, including some of the original campaigners, restarted Rhythms. With two stages, a fringe pub, Horace X, and Baka Beyond, ROTW became more of a festival. This increase in potency started to interest larger numbers of local music professionals.

With the benefit of these professionals and supporting volunteers ROTW 2000 was on a different level to the previous years; a purpose built stage dominated the Market Place, along with four others, and world music bands such as the Dhol Foundation, Bollywood Brass Band and Kiki Dee featured.

From then on, ROTW had increased its success. 2001 and 2002 saw ROTW increasing the number of stages and venues (including more fringe venues), bringing an eclectic programme of world music from places such as Siberia, Africa, South America, Tibet, India and Hitchin itself. Bands such as Ayub Ogada, Motimba, Itang Bondi and Yat Kha helped create what has now become the typical Rhythms musical atmosphere.

2003 saw 140 acts on 8 stages and market stalls selling various souvenirs, crafts and clothes from all over the world. The local St. Mary's church became a venue, and Bancroft Gardens became a family chillout area. Banners adorned Hitchin, which were made by the children from the local primary schools. This was the beginning of art taking a stand in the ROTW festival.

2004 had two main stages (the Market Place and Portmill Lane), plus, the BBC, the Arts Council and Decibel partnered with ROTW to help showcase national and local world bands. Even more banners were launched on the town.

2005 was similar to other years. 160 acts performing on 10 stages, plus, more dance and more poetry.

2006 saw 193 acts performing on 11 stages, plus workshops, more dance and more poetry.

2007 saw 142 acts performing on 8 stages, a dance hall hosting dance classes, workshops, more art and poetry. Artists performing included Monobloco and This was the last festival to be held on the streets of the town centre

For 2008 the festival moved to the ground of Hitchin Priory. The festival had over 120 acts on 5 stages, a sound system, an arena and a family area with activities and workshops. 23,000 people attended over the two days. Artist performing included Billy Cobham & Asere, No 1 Station and Massukos. A new addition to ROTW was the BBC Introducing... stage hosted by BBC Three Counties Radio.

The 2009 festival saw performances from Jazz Jamaica, The Jive Aces, Hjtalin, Etran Finatawa, The Magnolia Sisters, John Otway, Blyth Spirit, Flamboyant Bella and Exit Avenue. In front of a weekend audience of 26,000.

The 2010 festival saw performances from Black Polaris, The Swanvesta Social Club, Stu O'Connor, This Empire, My First tooth, The October Game, Lecarla, Red Dollar, HeKz, Spandex Ballet, Trailer Trash Orchestra, David Gibb & the Pony Club, CC Smugglers, Spiked, Trouble with Tuesday, Frog Stupid, Lika Sharps, Bayou Seco, Out of the Trees, The Xcerts, Ballachulish Hellhounds, The Whybirds, The Amigos, My Passion and Rotating Leslie. Over 25,000 people attended.

In 2011, the 20th festival was held on 9 and 10 July.

In 2012, the 21st festival was held on 14 and 15 July. With the wet weather, attendance was very low, the fields were very damaged and the festival lost a lot of money on holding the event.

In 2013, there was no festival due to having no venue in time.

However, in 2014, Rhythms of The World returned on 2 and 3 August, featuring the Number one Asian band in UK performing, as well as one of the biggest Cuban bands coming to Hitchin.

In 2018, ROTW was cancelled due to the North Hertfordshire Council refusing some of the license applications for the event.

In 2023, it was announced that Rhythms of the World would be dissolved, resulting in no future ROTW concerts. This was due to all three trustees resigning and a subsequent failure to replace them. They were facing additional issues, such as declining membership.
