= St. Cecilia and the Gypsy Soul =

Studio album by the Quireboys
- Released: 30 March 2015
- Recorded: 2014–2015
- Studio: Lemon Studios, Klippan
- Genre: Hard rock; blues rock; gypsy punk
- Length: 39:10; 2:52:49 (4CD)
- Label: Off Yer Rocka
- Producer: Martin Ekelund; The Quireboys

The Quireboys chronology
| Black Eyed Sons (2014) | St. Cecilia and the Gypsy Soul (2015) | Twisted Love (2016) |

Singles from St. Cecilia and the Gypsy Soul
- 1. "Gracie B EP" Released: 16 March 2015

St. Cecilia and the Gypsy Soul is the ninth studio album by English rock band the Quireboys. It was released by Off Yer Rocka Recordings on 30 March 2015 as part of a four-disc set, including a reissue of Halfpenny Dancer (2009) and two live performance discs.

The album received generally positive reviews and was noted for its acoustic instrumentation and stripped-down production.

== Background ==
In 2009, the Quireboys released Halfpenny Dancer, which featured acoustic re-recordings of their earlier work. The album was recorded at Lemon Studios in Klippan, Sweden, and the band returned in 2014 to record a similar acoustic album. The project changed direction, and instead, they began recording an album of new material.

== Track listing ==
All tracks are written by Spike and Guy Griffin, except where noted.

| No. | Title | Lyrics | Length |
|---|---|---|---|
| 1. | "Gracie B" | Spike, Griffin, Paul Guerin | 5:14 |
| 2. | "Land of My Father" | Spike, Griffin, Guerin | 3:21 |
| 3. | "St. Cecilia" | | 3:47 |
| 4. | "The Promise" | Spike, Griffin, Guerin | 4:42 |
| 5. | "Can't Hide it Anymore" | | 4:11 |
| 6. | "Out of Your Mind" | | 2:36 |
| 7. | "The Hurting Kind" | | 3:32 |
| 8. | "Adaline" | | 3:48 |
| 9. | "The Best Are Not Forgotten" | Spike, Griffin, Guerin | 2:52 |
| 10. | "Why Did it Take So Long" | | 5:03 |
| Total length: | | | 39:10 |

Disc 2: Halfpenny Dancer
| No. | Title | Length |
|---|---|---|
| 1. | "There She Goes Again" | 3:28 |
| 2. | "Devil of a Man" | 3:16 |
| 3. | "Love to Love" | 3:59 |
| 4. | "Mona Lisa Smiled" | 4:29 |
| 5. | "I Can't Stop Loving You" | 4:20 |
| 6. | "Roses & Rings" | 4:54 |
| 7. | "Baby It's You" | 3:13 |
| 8. | "Hello" | 4:36 |
| 9. | "Pretty Girls" | 3:56 |
| 10. | "He'll Have to Go" | 2:57 |
| 11. | "Long Time Comin'" | 3:01 |
| 12. | "Hates to Please" | 5:15 |
| 13. | "King of New York" | 6:08 |
| Total length: | | 53:36 |

Disc 3: Halfpenny Live, Part I
| No. | Title | Length |
|---|---|---|
| 1. | "There She Goes Again" | 4:16 |
| 2. | "Devil of a Man" | 3:37 |
| 3. | "Mona Lisa Smiled" | 4:21 |
| 4. | "Love to Love" | 4:27 |
| 5. | "Roses & Rings" | 4:46 |
| 6. | "Pretty Girls" | 4:08 |
| 7. | "I Can't Stop Loving You" | 5:54 |
| 8. | "One for the Road" | 4:10 |
| 9. | "Hello" | 4:14 |
| Total length: | | 38:58 |

Disc 4: Halfpenny Live, Part II
| No. | Title | Length |
|---|---|---|
| 1. | "Hates to Please" | 5:21 |
| 2. | "Long Time Comin'" | 3:21 |
| 3. | "Have a Drink with Me" | 4:39 |
| 4. | "Late Night Saturday Call" | 5:41 |
| 5. | "Misled" | 3:50 |
| 6. | "I Love this Dirty Town" | 4:56 |
| 7. | "7 O'Clock" | 5:56 |
| 8. | "I Don't Love You Any More" | 7:26 |
| Total length: | | 41:04 |

== Touring ==
Prior to album's release, and in continuation of the band's 30th anniversary celebrations, the band announced a series of intimate shows beginning in the United Kingdom. The shows involved classic tracks, rarities, surprises as well as a selection of new material, played in unplugged arrangements.

=== Tour dates ===
Unplugged & Personal UK Headline Tour
| Date | City | Country | Venue |
|---|---|---|---|
| 27 February 2015 | Bolton | England | The Railway Venue |
| 28 February 2015 | Winchester | England | The Railway Inn |
| 1 March 2015 | Leamington | England | Zephyr Lounge |
| 6 March 2015 | Chester | England | The Live Rooms |
| 7 March 2015 | Rushden | England | The Attic |
| 8 March 2015 | Leicester | England | The Musician |
| 9 March 2015 | Bilston | England | The Robin 2 |
| 11 March 2015 | Evesham | England | Iron Road Rock Bar |
| 12 March 2015 | Swansea | Wales | Static Bar |
| 13 March 2015 | Cardiff | Wales | Fuel Rock Club |
| 15 March 2015 | Norwich | England | The Brickmakers |
| 19 March 2015 | Wakefield | England | Warehouse 23 |
| 20 March 2015 | Grimsby | England | Yardbirds Rock Club |
| 21 March 2015 | Bingley | England | The Arts Centre |
| 22 March 2015 | Doncaster | England | The Diamond Live Lounge |
| 26 March 2015 | Edinburgh | Scotland | Bannerman's Bar |
| 28 March 2015 | Ballymena | Scotland | Diamond Rock Club |
Unplugged in the USA
| Date | City | State | Venue |
| 18-22 April 2015 | Miami | FL | Monsters of Rock, The Hangover Cruise |
| 29 April 2015 | New York City | New York] | The Bowery Electric |
| 30 April 2015 | Philadelphia | PA | Legendary Dobbs |
| 2 May 2015 | Amityville | NY | Revolution Bar |
St. Cecilia European Tour – Leg I
| Date | City | Country | Venue |
| 8 August 2015 | Brienz | Switzerland | Brienzersee Rock Festival |
| 12 August 2015 | Dudenhofen | Germany | City Hall |
| 13 August 2015 | Pratteln | Switzerland | Z7 Konzertfabrik |
| 14 August 2015 | Finkenbach | Germany | Finiki Open Air |
| 15 August 2015 | Essen | Germany | Turock |
| 27-31 August 2015 | Hamburg | Germany | Wacken Open Air, Full Metal Cruise III |
| 5 September 2015 | Harlow | United Kingdom | The Square |
| 6 September 2015 | Farnham | United Kingdom | Weyfest |
| 12 September 2015 | Château de la Princesse d'Arenberg, Raismes | France | Raismes Fest |
| 8 October 2015 | Gijón | Spain | Casino Acapulco |
| 9 October 2015 | Santiago de Compostela | Spain | Sala Capital |
| 10 October 2015 | Vitoria | Spain | Jimmy Jazz |
| 11 October 2015 | Calella | Spain | Calella Rockfest |
| 17 October 2015 | Cagliari | Italy | Fabrik |
| 28 October 2015 | Calella | France | Club Pacific Rock |
| 31 October 2015 | Holmfirth | United Kingdom | Holmfirth Halloween Rock |
Unplugged in the UK
| Date | City | Country | Venue |
| 12 November 2015 | York | England | Fibbers |
| 13 November 2015 | Edinburgh | Scotland | Bannerman's Bar |
| 14 November 2015 | Ballymena | Scotland | Diamond Rock Club |
| 15 November 2015 | Chester | England | The Live Rooms |
| 19 November 2015 | Wolverhampton | England | Slade Rooms |
| 20 November 2015 | Evesham | England | Iron Road Rock Bar |
| 21 November 2015 | Cardiff | Wales | Fuel Rock Club |
| 22 November 2015 | London | England | The Borderline |
St. Cecilia European Tour – Leg II
| Date | City | Country | Venue |
| 3 December 2015 | Gothenburg | Sweden | Sticky Fingers |
| 4 December 2015 | Linköping | Sweden | Palaset |
| 5 December 2015 | Karlshamn | Sweden | Live Entertainment |
| 6 December 2015 | Stockholm | Sweden | Debaser Strand |
| 8 December 2015 | Stuttgart | Germany | Kellerclub |
| 9 December 2015 | Zug | Switzerland | Chollerhalle |
| 10 December 2015 | Frankfurt | Germany | Das Bett |
| 11 December 2015 | Lichtenfels | Germany | Paunchy Cats |
| 12 December 2015 | Hagan a.T.W. | Germany | Stock |
| 13 December 2015 | Hamburg | Germany | Rock Café, St. Pauli |
| 14 December 2015 | Cologne | Germany | MTC |
| 15 December 2015 | Düsseldorf | Germany | The Tube |
| 16 December 2015 | Berlin | Germany | Frannz Club |
| 18 December 2015 | Berlin | Purmerend | P3 |
| 19 December 2015 | Rotterdam | Netherlands | Baroeg |
| 20 December 2015 | Roeselare | Belgium | De Verlichte Geest |
| 21 January 2016 | Zaragoza | Spain | La Casa del Loco |
| 22 January 2016 | Valladolid | Spain | Porta Caeli |
| 23 January 2016 | Madrid | Spain | Copernico |
| 24 January 2016 | Serville | Spain | Sala X |
| 12 February 2016 | Oslo | Norway | Olsen Pa Bryn |
| 13 February 2016 | Sandnes | Norway | Tribute |
| 17 February 2016 | Schaffhausen | Switzerland | Kammgarn |
| 18 February 2016 | Aarburg | Switzerland | Musigburg |
| 19 February 2016 | Rubigen | Switzerland | Hunziken |
| 24 February 2016 | Turin | Italy | El Barrio |
| 25 February 2016 | Bergamo | Italy | Druso |
| 26 February 2016 | Rome | Italy | Traffic |
| 27 February 2016 | Pisa | Italy | Borderline |
Live UK & Ireland Tour
| Date | City | Country | Venue |
| 4 March 2016 | Buckley | Wales | The Tivoli |
| 5 March 2016 | Grimsby | England | Yardbirds Rock Club |
| 10 March 2016 | Pwllheli | Wales | HRH AOR 4, Hafan y Môr |
| 11 March 2016 | Belfast | Northern Ireland | Limelight 2 |
| 12 March 2016 | Dublin | Ireland | Voodoo Lounge |
| 16 March 2016 | Manchester | England | The Ritz |
| 17 March 2016 | Glasgow | Scotland | O2 ABC |
| 18 March 2016 | Bristol | England | O2 Academy |
| 19 March 2016 | Nottingham | England | Rescue Rooms |
| 20 March 2016 | Newcastle | England | O2 Academy |
| 24 March 2016 | Sheffield | England | O2 Academy |
| 25 March 2016 | London | England | O2 Academy |
| 26 March 2016 | Birmingham | England | O2 Academy |
| 1 April 2016 | Norwich | England | The Waterfront |
| 2 April 2016 | Wakefield | England | Warehouse 23 |
| Date | City | Country | Venue |
| 1-5 October 2016 | Los Angeles | United States | Monsters of Rock, West Coast Cruise |

== Personnel ==
Band members

- Jonathan "Spike" Gray – lead vocals
- Guy Griffin – lead guitar, rhythm guitar, backing vocals
- Paul Guerin – lead guitar, rhythm guitar, backing vocals
- Keith Weir – keyboards, backing vocals
- Dave McCluskey – drums
- Nick Malling – bass guitar

Additional musicians

- Martin Ekelund – drums, bass, percussion, cello, minimoog

Production

- Martin Ekelund and the Quireboys – producing, mixing, mastering
- Jonni Davis – artwork concept
