= White Trash Blues =

Studio album by the Quireboys
- Released: 5 September 2017
- Recorded: 2015–2016
- Genre: Rock; blues rock
- Length: 50:44
- Label: Off Yer Rocka

The Quireboys chronology
Twisted Love (2016)	White Trash Blues (2017)

White Trash Blues is the eleventh studio album and a cover album by English rock band the Quireboys, released on 5 September 2017. The album is a set of covers of blues classics from artists such as Muddy Waters, John Lee Hooker and Chuck Berry.

== Reception ==
The album has received mostly positive to mixed reviews.

== Track listing ==
1. Cross Eyed Cat
2. Boom Boom
3. I Wish You Would
4. Take Out Some Insurance
5. Going Down
6. Help Me
7. Shame Shame Shame
8. I'm Your Hoochie Coochie Man
9. Leaving Trunk
10. I'm a King Bee
11. Walking the Dog
12. Little Queenie

== Charts ==
Chart performance of White Trash Blues
Chart (2017)	Peak position
UK Independent Albums (OCC)	34
UK Jazz & Blues Albums (OCC)	3
UK Physical Albums (OCC)	88

== Personnel ==
- Jonathan "Spike" Gray – lead vocals
- Guy Griffin – lead guitar, rhythm guitar, backing vocals
- Paul Guerin – lead guitar, rhythm guitar, backing vocals
- Keith Weir – keyboards, backing vocals
- Dave McCluskey – drums
- Nick Malling – bass guitar
