= Wardour Street (album) =

2024 studio album by The Quireboys

Studio album by Quireboys
- Released: 25 October 2024
- Label: Cadiz Music

Singles from Wardour Street
- 1. "Jeeze Louise" Released: 31 October 2023; 2. "Raining Whiskey" Released: 24 May 2024; 3. "I Think I Got It Wrong Again" Released: 27 September 2024

Wardour Street is the thirteenth studio album by English rock band the Quireboys. It was released on 25 October 2024 through Cadiz Music. The album is named after Wardour Street, a prominent street in London's Soho district known for its music venues and historic significance to the UK rock scene.

== Background ==
Wardour Street is the first Quireboys album after the band splintered in early 2022. Frontman Spike was fired from the band, leaving Guy Griffin as lead vocalist. In May 2022, Spike announced his reunion with former Quireboys members Guy Bailey, Chris Johnstone, Rudy Richman and Nigel Mogg.

On 9 December 2022, newly formed group released a two-track single, "Merry Christmas and a Happy New Year", in support of Care After Combat, a charity for British combat veterans. The album's lead single, "Jeeze Louise", was released on 31 October 2023. The release of Wardour Street was originally announced for spring, coinciding with a UK tour in May 2024, with guitarist Luke Morley from Thunder performing in place of Guy Bailey, who had died in April 2023. The release date was later pushed back to 13 September. The album's second single, "Raining Whiskey" was released on 24 May 2024.

== Track listing ==
Wardour Street track listing
No.	Title	Length
1.	"Jeeze Louise"
2.	"Raining Whiskey" (feat. Frankie Miller)
3.	"You and I"
4.	"I Think I Got It Wrong"
5.	"Myrtle Beach"
6.	"Happy"
7.	"No Honour Amongst Thieves"
8.	"Howlin' Wolf"
9.	"Ain't Over Now"
10.	"Like It or Not"
11.	"Wardour Street"

== Charts ==
Chart (2024)	Peak position
Scottish Albums (OCC)	85
UK Album Sales (OCC)	93
UK Independent Albums (OCC)	37
UK Physical Albums (OCC)	94
