= Hey You (The Quireboys song) =

1989 single by the Quireboys

Single by the Quireboys

from the album A Bit of What You Fancy
- Released: December 1989
- Length: 3:20
- Label: EMI
- Songwriters: Spike Gray; Guy Bailey
- Producers: Jim Cregan; George Tutko

The Quireboys singles chronology
"7 O'Clock" (1989)	"Hey You" (1989)	"I Don't Love You Anymore" (1990)

"Hey You" is a song by the English rock band the Quireboys, released as a single in December 1989 from their album A Bit of What You Fancy. It is their highest-charting single, peaking at number 14 on the UK Singles Chart. The song was written by Quireboys members Spike and Guy Bailey.

== Charts ==
Chart (1989–1990)	Peak position
Canada Top Singles (RPM)	82
Europe (Eurochart Hot 100)	35
Netherlands (Dutch Top 40)	26
Netherlands (Single Top 100)	23
UK Singles (Official Charts)	14
