= Blackballed =

Blackballed may refer to:

- Blackballed (band), a UK rock band from Manchester.
- Blackballed: The Bobby Dukes Story, a 2004 comedy film.

== See also ==
- Blackball (disambiguation)
- Blackballing, a rejection in a traditional form of secret ballot, where a black ball signifies opposition.
