= Beautiful Curse =

Studio album by the Quireboys
- Released: 24 June 2013
- Recorded: 2012–2013
- Genre: Rock; blues rock
- Label: Off Yer Rocka

The Quireboys chronology
Halfpenny Dancer (2009)	Beautiful Curse (2013)	Black Eyed Sons (2014)

Singles from Beautiful Curse
- 1. "Too Much of a Good Thing" Released: 15 May 2013; 2. "Diamonds and Dirty Stones" Released: 24 August 2013; 3. "Mother Mary" Released: 15 December 2013

Beautiful Curse is the seventh studio album by English rock band the Quireboys, released in 2013.

== Release and promotion ==
The Quireboys announced plans for a new album in March 2013 after signing with Off Yer Rocka Records in January. "Too Much of a Good Thing" was released as the album's lead single on 15 May 2013. The album followed on 24 June.

"Diamonds and Dirty Stones" followed as the second single on 24 August 2013. "Mother Mary" was released as the album's third and final single on 15 December 2013.

The band embarked on a UK tour in support of the album in October 2013.

== Critical reception ==
Professional ratings
Review scores
Source	Rating
Classic Rock	4/5 stars

In Classic Rock magazine, Kris Needs likened Beautiful Curse to the Rolling Stones, and described the album as "a welcome blast of smoky air". Martin Haslam of Louder Than War opined that Beautiful Curse is "a more balanced album" than its predecessor, Homewreckers & Heartbreakers, commending them on their commitment to rock and roll.

== Track listing ==
1. Too Much of a Good Thing
2. Chain Smokin’
3. Talk of the Town
4. Mother Mary
5. King of Fools
6. Homewreckers and Heartbreakers
7. Diamonds and Dirty Stones
8. Beautiful Curse
9. Don't Fight It
10. For Crying Out Loud
11. Twenty Seven Years
12. I Died Laughing

== Charts ==
Chart performance of Beautiful Curse
Chart (2013)	Peak position
UK Independent Albums (OCC)	44

== Personnel ==
- Jonathan "Spike" Gray – lead vocals
- Guy Griffin – lead guitar, rhythm guitar, backing vocals
- Paul Guerin – lead guitar, rhythm guitar, backing vocals
- Keith Weir – keyboards, backing vocals
- Dave McCluskey – drums
- Nick Malling – bass guitar
