= Black Eyed Sons =

Studio album by the Quireboys
- Released: 16 June 2014
- Recorded: 2013–2014
- Studio: The Ecology Room
- Genre: Rock; blues rock
- Label: Off Yer Rocka

The Quireboys chronology
Beautiful Curse (2013)	Black Eyed Sons (2014)	St. Cecilia and the Gypsy Soul (2015)

Black Eyed Sons is the eighth studio album by English rock band the Quireboys, released in 2014. The album was released with an unplugged live album records in Sweden and a DVD of a performance in London recorded during the Beautiful Curse tour.

== Track listing ==
=== Black Eyed Sons ===
All songs written by Guy Griffin and Spike, except where noted.

1. Troublemaker (Black Eyed Son)
2. What Do Want from Me?
3. Julieanne
4. Double Dealin'
5. Stubborn Kinda Heart
6. Lullaby of London Town
7. The Messenger
8. You Never Can Tell
9. Mother's Ruin
10. Monte Cassino (Lady Lane) (Written by Guy Griffin, Spike, and Paul Guerin)

=== Unplugged in Sweden ===
1. Don't Bite the Hand That Feeds You
2. There She Goes Again
3. Devil Of A Man
4. Mona Lisa Smiled
5. Roses & Rings
6. Misled
7. Have A Drink With Me
8. Sweet Mary Ann
9. I Don't Love You Anymore
10. 7 O'Clock

=== Beautifully Cursed in London ===
1. Black Mariah
2. Too Much Of A Good Thing
3. Misled
4. There She Goes Again
5. Homewreckers & Heartbreakers
6. This Is Rock n Roll
7. Mona Lisa Smiled
8. Diamonds & Dirty Stones
9. 27 Years
10. I Don't Love You Anymore
11. Tramps & Thieves
12. Hey You
13. Beautiful Curse
14. Chain Smokin'
15. I Love This Dirty Town
16. 7 O'Clock
17. For Cryin' Out Loud
18. Mother Mary
19. Sex Party

== Charts ==
Chart performance of Black Eyed Sons
Chart (2014)	Peak position
UK Independent Albums (OCC)	13
UK Physical Albums (OCC)	71
UK Rock & Metal Albums (OCC)	7

== Personnel ==
- Jonathan "Spike" Gray – lead vocals
- Guy Griffin – lead guitar, rhythm guitar, backing vocals
- Paul Guerin – lead guitar, rhythm guitar, backing vocals
- Keith Weir – keyboards, backing vocals
- Dave McCluskey – drums
- Nick Malling – bass guitar
