= This Is Rock'n'Roll =

Studio album by the Quireboys
- Released: 16 July 2001
- Studio: E.M.G. Studio North Hollywood
- Genre: Rock, hard rock
- Length: 54:16
- Label: Sanctuary
- Producer: The Quireboys; C. J. Eriksson

The Quireboys chronology
Bitter Sweet & Twisted (1993)	This Is Rock'n'Roll (2001)	Well Oiled (2004)

Professional ratings
Review scores
Source	Rating
Kerrang!	4/5 stars

This Is Rock'n'Roll is rock band the Quireboys's third studio album, it is the first album recorded after the band re-united. Their last album before this was recorded in 1993.

== Critical reception ==
Greg Pratt of Exclaim! described the album as "one of the best rock and roll albums to come out in a long time", subtracting the glam and adding maturity to "the gritty, dirty, melancholy pub rock of old". Essi Berelian of Classic Rock magazine regards This Is Rock 'n' Roll as superior to their previous album, Bitter Sweet & Twisted, and one of their "best, most coherent" records.

== Track listing ==
All songs written by Spike and Guy Griffin, except where noted otherwise.

No.	Title	Writer(s)	Length
1.	"This Is Rock'n'Roll"		3:22
2.	"Show Me What You Got"		5:17
3.	"Searching"		4:18
4.	"Six Degrees"		3:49
5.	"C'mon"		4:13
6.	"Seven Days"		4:10
7.	"Taken for a Ride"		4:49
8.	"Coldharbour Lane"	Spike	3:44
9.	"Turn Away"		3:48
10.	"To Be"		5:04
11.	"Enough for One Lifetime"		3:27
12.	"It's Alright"		3:27
13.	"Never Let Me Go"		4:44

== Band ==
- Spike – vocals
- Guy Griffin – guitar
- Luke Bossendorfer – guitar
- Nigel Mogg – bass
- Martin Henderson – drums and percussion
- Kevin Savigar – keyboards
