= Halfpenny Dancer =

Studio album by the Quireboys
- Released: 31 March 2009
- Genre: Rock; blues rock; country rock; acoustic
- Length: 1:01:23
- Label: Hecktick Records/Jerkin' Crocus Promotions
- Producer: Chris Corney, Guy Griffin

The Quireboys chronology
Homewreckers & Heartbreakers (2008)	Halfpenny Dancer (2009)	Beautiful Curse (2013)

Halfpenny Dancer is an album by English rock band the Quireboys, released in 2009.

The album consists of their songs, captured in acoustic form. Two different editions of Halfpenny Dancer were released: the original 13 song version, limited to 1000 copies, and a deluxe package with a new design and two bonus songs: "Halfpenny Dancer" and "Have A Drink With Me". The album was produced by Chris Corney.

== Track listing ==
1. "There She Goes Again" (Bailey/Gray)
2. "Devil of a Man" (Bailey/Gray)
3. "Love to Love" (Schenker, Mogg) UFO cover
4. "Mona Lisa Smiled" (Griffin/Gray)
5. "Halfpenny Dancer" (Gray/Griffin)
6. "I Can't Stop Loving You" (Billy Nicholls)
7. "Roses & Rings" (Gray/Bailey)
8. "Baby It's You" (Miller)
9. "Hello" (Griffin/Gray)
10. "Pretty Girls" (Gray/Bailey)
11. "He'll Have to Go" (Joe Allison, Audrey Allison)
12. "Long Time Comin'" (Gray/Bailey)
13. "Have a Drink with Me" (Gray/Guerin)
14. "Hates to Please" (Bailey/Gray)
15. "King of New York" (Bailey/Gray/Vallance)

== Personnel ==
- Spike – vocals
- Guy Griffin – guitars, backing vocals
- Keith Weir – piano, backing vocals
- Paul Guerin – guitars
- Phil Martini – drums, percussion
- Damon Williams – bass

=== Additional musicians ===
- Rob Bond – pedal steel
- Moritz Behm – fiddle
- Lee Spence – mandolin, dobro
- Rachel Cullum – violin on "Hello"
- Chris Corney – bass, banjo, dobro
