= Bitter Sweet & Twisted =

Studio album by the Quireboys
- Released: 15 March 1993
- Genre: Rock; hard rock
- Length: 1:00:28
- Label: EMI
- Producer: Bob Rock; Chris Kimsey

The Quireboys chronology
A Bit of What You Fancy (1990)	Bitter Sweet & Twisted (1993)	This Is Rock'N'Roll (2001)

Singles from Bitter Sweet & Twisted
- 1. "Tramps and Thieves" Released: 1992; 2. "Brother Louie" Released: 1993; 3. "Last Time" Released: 1993

Bitter Sweet & Twisted is rock band the Quireboys's second studio album, released in 1993. The album was released on EMI and went into the UK Albums Chart at #31.

Three of the tracks from this album ("Tramps & Thieves", "Brother Louie" and "Last Time") were released as singles, the latter of which was only released in Japan. "Brother Louie" was the highest charting from this album, as it reached #32 on the UK Singles Chart.

The album was produced mostly by Bob Rock, some of the tracks were produced by the Rolling Stones producer Chris Kimsey. After this album, the Quireboys would split up and didn't release another studio album until 2001.

== Track listing ==
=== Original release ===
1. "Tramps and Thieves"
2. "White Trash Blues"
3. "Can't Park Here"
4. "King of New York"
5. "Don't Bite the Hand"
6. "Last Time"
7. "Debbie"
8. "Brother Louie"
9. "Ode to You (Baby Just Walk)"
10. "Hates to Please"
11. "My Saint Jude"
12. "Take No Revenge"
13. "Wild, Wild, Wild"
14. "Ain't Love Blind"

Japanese bonus

1. "Hey you (Live)"
2. "Sweet Mary Ann (Live)"
3. "Tramps & thieves (Live)"

=== Mispressed Italian First release ===
The initial Italian release of Bitter Sweet & Twisted used an incorrect master recording, with a different running order, omitting the single "Brother Louie" and the tracks "Don't Bite The Hand" and "Ain't Love Blind", while "My Saint Jude" is replaced by a demo version entitled "My Sweet Little Girl". "Can't Get Through" (issued as B-side of the "Brother Louie" single) was added as last track. The tracklist printed on the back cover, booklet and CD is as in the official releases.

1. "Tramps and Thieves"
2. "White Trash Blues"
3. "Can't Park Here"
4. "King of New York"
5. "Wild, Wild, Wild"
6. "Last Time"
7. "Debbie"
8. "Ode to You (Baby Just Walk)"
9. "Hates to Please"
10. "My Sweet Little Girl (Demo)"
11. "Take No Revenge"
12. "Can't Get Through"

== Charts ==
Chart (1993)	Peak position
Japanese Albums (Oricon)	49
Swedish Albums (Sverigetopplistan)	25
UK Albums (OCC)	31

== Personnel ==
- Spike - vocals, harmonica, guitar
- Guy Bailey - guitar, mandolin, vocals
- Guy Griffin - guitar, sitar, vocals
- Nigel Mogg - bass, vocals
- Rudy Richman - drums, percussion
- Chris Johnstone - piano, Hammond B3, clavinet

=== Additional personnel ===
- Bob Buckley - string arrangement

== Singles ==
- Tramps and Thieves (1992) UK #41
- Brother Louie (1993) UK #32
- Last Time (1993) Japan only release
