= The Quireboys =

English rock band

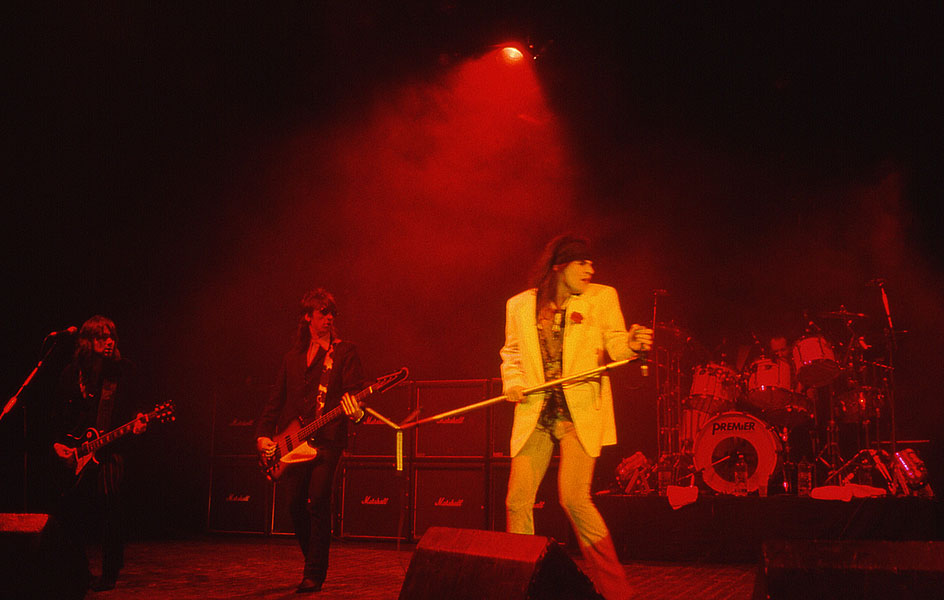
- The Quireboys performing in the Hammersmith Odeon venue in London, 7 April 1993

Background information
- Origin: London, England
- Genres: Rock; hard rock; blues rock
- Years active: 1984–1993, 1995, 2001–present
- Labels: EMI; Sanctuary; SPV; Jerkin' Crocus; Off Yer Rocka
- Members: Spike; Nigel Mogg; Luke Morley; Willie Dowling; Gary "Harry" James
- Past members: Mark Sweetmore; Thomas Golzen; Ginger; Guy Bailey; Guy Griffin; Luke Bossendorfer; Paul Guerin; Jimmi Crutchley; Damon Williams; Dave Boyce; Nick Mailing; Bill Coyne; Paul Hornby; Nick "Cozy" Connell; Ian Wallace; Rudy Richman; Simon Hanson; Martin Henderson; Jason Bonham; Michael Lee; Pip Mailing; Phil Martini; Matt Goom; Dave McCluskey; Chris Johnstone; Kevin Savigar; Keith Weir
- Website: www.spikequireboys.com

The Quireboys are an English rock band formed in 1984 in London, with strong ties to Newcastle. Originally known as the Choirboys, then the Queerboys, billed as the London Quireboys in the United States and Canada, settling at last with their current name.

== History ==
=== 1985–1989: Formation ===
Vocalist Jonathan Gray (commonly referred to as just 'Spike') moved from Newcastle upon Tyne to London when he was 17 years old and met guitarist Guy Bailey in a bar.

By the mid-1980s, the two decided to form a rock and roll band, the name chosen for the group was originally 'the Choirboys' taken from the 1977 movie of the same name, before renaming themselves to the Queerboys, which was based on a taunting remark from another regular at a bar the pair frequented.

The Queerboys started to build up a following, playing at the Marquee Club. The band's drummer Paul Hornby soon left to join Dogs D'Amour, who would soon become friends and associates of the Quireboys, and was replaced by Nick "Cozy" Connell.

On 28 March 1986, the Queerboys appeared with Bernie Torme and the Moho Pack at what was Klub Foot at the Clarendon Hotel, Hammersmith. In May of that year, they played support dates on a Cherry Bombz tour.

By 1987, the band's controversial name was starting to hinder them, it caused some of the gigs on their tour with Andy McCoy's band to be cancelled. They were also booked to play Reading Festival, on the understanding that they would change their name. Thus they changed it to the Quireboys and have kept the name ever since.

=== 1990–1995: A Bit of What You Fancy and Bitter Sweet & Twisted ===
Sharon Osbourne was appointed as manager and the Quireboys were signed to EMI for the release of their debut album, A Bit of What You Fancy. By 1990, the Quireboys had fired second guitarist Ginger (who went on to form the Wildhearts), who they replaced with former Cradle Snatchers / Feline Groove guitarist Guy Griffin.

The debut album was produced by Jim Cregan and George Tutko at Cherokee Studios in Los Angeles, California. Ron Nevison mixed the album. The band entered the UK Albums Chart at No. 2. A Bit of What You Fancy drew positive reviews and was compared favourably to British rock names such as Rod Stewart and Faces.

The long touring schedule was finished off with a gig in Japan at the Tokyo Dome on New Year's Eve in front of 50,000 people. A live album was released following this long touring, entitled Live (Recorded Around the World).

The band began working on their second album in October 1991 with producer Bob Rock. The project saw numerous delays due to Rock's other engagements, and personnel changes at EMI. In the spring of 1992, Chris Kimsey was brought in to re-work some of the tracks. Bitter Sweet & Twisted was finally released in March 1993 and peaked at no. 31 on the UK Albums Chart.

Following the release of Bitter Sweet & Twisted, the Quireboys disbanded for eight years. Griffin attributed the breakup to "business stuff" and the emergence of grunge music. Following a run of successful live shows in Los Angeles, they decided to revive the band in 2001 with a new lineup.

=== 1994–2000: Solo projects ===
In the interim, the Quireboys members embarked on their own recording projects. In 1995, Spike formed a duo with Darrell Bath of the Dogs D'Amour. Their album, Take Out Some Insurance, was released under the moniker Spike n' Darrell. In the following year, Spike formed the duo Hot Knives with Tyla, and together they released Flagrantly Yours. Spike's debut solo album, Blue Eyed Soul, was released in 1997. In the same year, Spike released one album as part of the band God's Hotel.

=== 2001–2021: Reformation and subsequent albums ===
The Quireboys' reformation began with the release of their third studio album, This Is Rock'n'Roll, in July 2001. AllMusic described it as one of the band's "more consistent, focused and inspired efforts".

The band's fourth studio album, Well Oiled, was released in 2004 through SPV.

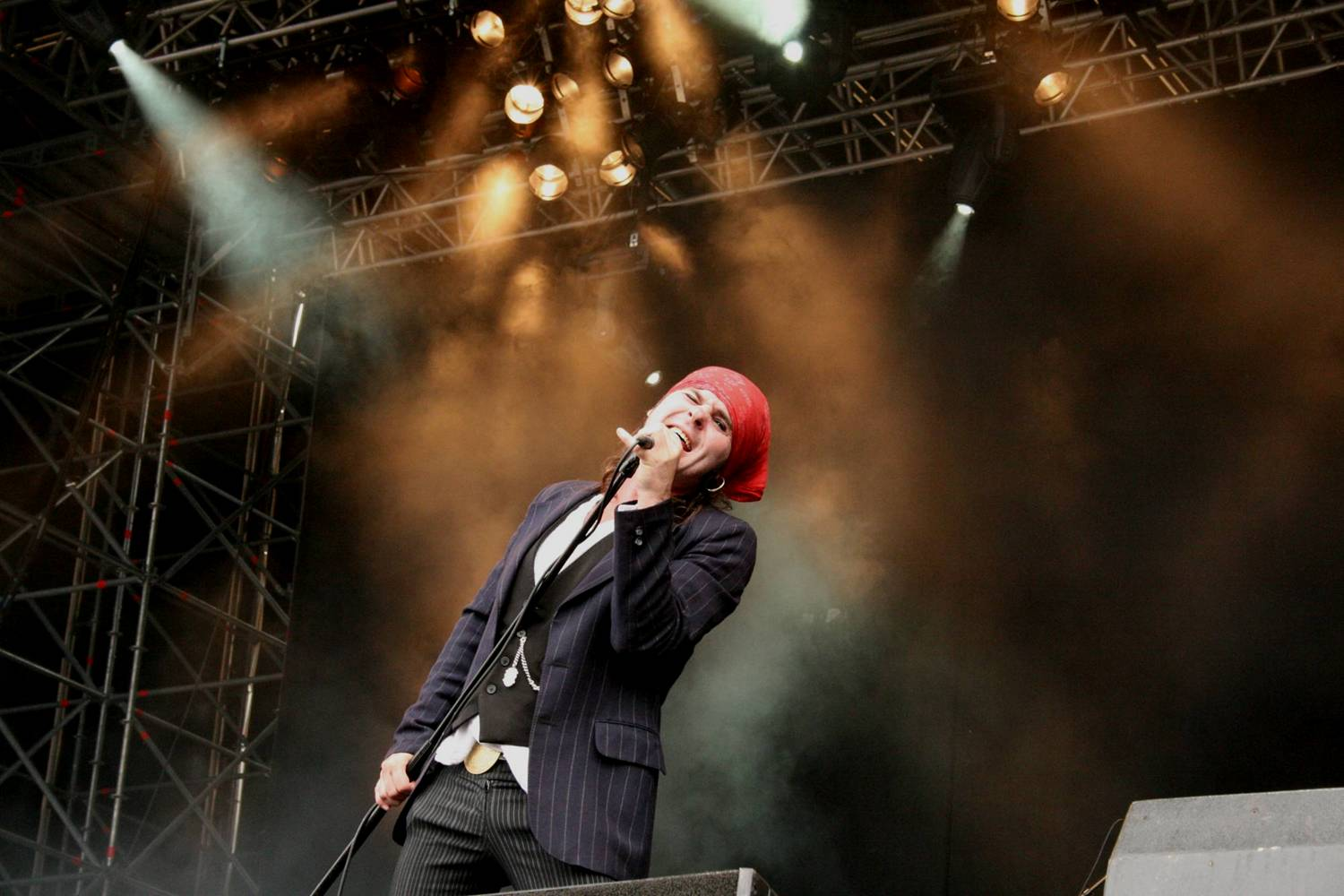
The Quireboys at the Norway Rock Festival in 2008

On 12 May 2008, the Quireboys released their fifth album, Homewreckers & Heartbreakers, through Jerkin' Crocus. Talking about the inspiration for the new album, Paul Guerin said "It's a funny story. We were in Malmö, Sweden in the dressing room. It was just before the show and we'd had a few frothy quenchers. We were trying to come up with album titles, and everyone was laughing at the suggestions. A certain member of the band was regaling a story about something he'd done, and another member of the band said "you're just a home wrecker," and someone else said "yeah, and a heartbreaker". We were just having a laugh, and bang, there it was. It was as simple as that."

In March 2013, the Quireboys played aboard the Monsters of Rock Cruise, along with bands such as Cinderella, Tesla, Kix, and Queensrÿche. The band released a new single "Too Much of a Good Thing" on 15 May 2013, taken from their seventh studio album, Beautiful Curse, which was released a month later in June 2013.

The band's twelfth studio album, Amazing Disgrace, was released on 5 April 2019. Classic Rock referred to the album as "energetic and dynamic", and "the best Quireboys album for ages". The album was preceded by its lead single, "Seven Deadly Sins". The band supported the album with a tour of the UK and Spain between March and May 2019. The album was originally crowdfunded through PledgeMusic, but the band were affected by PledgeMusic's payment issues scandal. Off Yer Rocka Recordings stepped in to fund the album.

In late 2021 they supported the Dead Daisies on their UK Tour. The February 2022 Monsters of Rock Cruise included the Quireboys as a five-piece, with Griffin covering vocal duties, after "a last-minute nonappearance" from Spike.

=== 2022–2024 ===
In March 2022, the Griffin led version announced that they had released lead vocalist Spike from their version of the band. This sparked a mixed reaction from fans, leading two venues to cancel their upcoming Quireboys dates. However, the Griffin version continued to tour with Guy Griffin as lead vocalist. In 2023, they completed tours of Germany and the UK, and performed at Hellfest in Clisson, France.

The split sparked a dispute about legal ownership of the Quireboys name.

In May 2022, Spike announced that he was reuniting with original members Guy Bailey and Nigel Mogg to write and record new music using the Quireboys name. He later announced an upcoming concert in London featuring Quireboys members Chris Johnstone and Rudy Richman, due to take place in December 2022. On 9 December 2022, they released a two-track single "Merry Christmas and a Happy New Year" in support of Care After Combat, a charity for British combat veterans.

On 7 December 2022, the Griffin led band released a live album recorded at O2 Forum Kentish Town in September 2022. The Griffin led band announced they were intending to release an album, titled The Band Rolls On..., was announced in July 2022, with a release date later confirmed for September 2023. The lead single "Lie to Me" was released on 5 December 2022. A second single, "Medicine", featuring Josh Todd and Stevie D. from Buckcherry, was released on 14 July 2023. The band announced a British tour to mark the 10th anniversary of Beautiful Curse between April and September 2023, supported by Blackballed.

On 6 April 2023, guitarist Guy Bailey died. In an announcement, Spike revealed that he and Bailey had written songs for a new Quireboys album featuring bandmates Chris Johnstone, Nigel Mogg and Rudy Richman. The album, titled Wardour Street, was released in late 2024. The lead single, "Jeeze Louise", was released on 31 October 2023. The album's release was preceded by a UK tour in May 2024, with guitarist Luke Morley from Thunder performing in place of Guy Bailey.

On 2 September 2024, the dispute ended when Griffin's lineup announced that they had adopted a new band name, Black Eyed Sons, and released their debut album entitled Cowboys in Pinstriped Suits on 28 January 2025.

=== 2024-present ===
The Quireboys toured in November 2024 in support of Wardour Street. The album was launched with a show in honour of Spike's mother in September 2024.

Spike confirmed in a joint Facebook and Instagram post in June 2026 that Luke Morley and himself were working on the latest Quireboys album, with the first single due to be released ahead of the Quireboys tour in October of the same year.

== Personnel ==
=== Current members ===
The Quireboys

- Spike – lead vocals, harmonica, occasional guitar (1984–1993, 1995, 2001–present)
- Willie Dowling – keyboards (2024-present)
- Nigel Mogg – bass, backing vocals (1984–1993, 1995, 2001–2005, 2022–present)
- Luke Morley – guitars, backing vocals (2023–present)
- Harry James – drums (2024–present)

=== Former members ===
- Guy Bailey – guitar, mandolin, backing vocals (1984–1993, 1995, 2022–2023; his death)
- Chris Johnstone – keyboards (1984–1993, 1995, 2022–2024, USA MOR Cruise 2026, occasional live and studio guest)
- Paul Hornby – drums (died 2015)
- Nick "Cozy" Connell – drums
- Ginger – guitar (1987–1989)
- Ian Wallace – drums (died 2007)
- Rudy Richman – drums
- Kevin Savigar – keyboards
- Martin Henderson – drums (2001–2002)
- Luke Bossendorfer – guitar (2001–2003)
- Bill Coyne – drums (1984)
- Tom Golzen – guitar (1984, guest 2026)
- Guy Griffin - guitar
- Paul Guerin- guitar
- Michael Lee – drums (died 2008)
- Tim Bewlay – bass
- Damon Williams – bass
- Jimmi Crutchley – bass
- Dave Boyce – bass
- Gary "Gaz" Ivin – bass
- Nick Mailing – bass
- Phil Martini – drums
- Matt Goom – drums
- Dave McCluskey – drums
- Pip Mailing - drums (2004-2009, 2019-2023)
- Share Ross – bass (USA MOR Cruise)
- Jason Bonham – drums (UK MOR Arena Tour)
- Matty James Cassidy – drums (USA MOR Cruise 2026), bass (Cornwall Rocks & UK tour 2026)

== Discography ==
=== Albums ===
Title	Details	Peak chart position			Certifications (sales thresholds)
Title	Details	UK	UK Indie	SWE	Certifications (sales thresholds)
A Bit of What You Fancy	Released: 29 January 1990; Label: EMI/Parlophone	2	—	11	BPI: Gold
Bitter Sweet & Twisted	Released: 15 March 1993; Label: EMI/Parlophone	31	—	25	
This Is Rock'n'Roll	Released: 16 July 2001; Label: Sanctuary	—	—	—	
Well Oiled	Released: 4 May 2004; Label: SPV	—	—	—	
Homewreckers & Heartbreakers	Released: 23 June 2008; Label: Jerkin' Crocus	—	—	—	
Halfpenny Dancer	Released: 31 March 2009; Label: Jerkin' Crocus	—	—	—	
Beautiful Curse	Released: 24 June 2013; Label: Off Yer Rocka	—	44	—	
Black Eyed Sons	Released: 16 June 2014; Label: Off Yer Rocka	—	13	—	
St. Cecilia and the Gypsy Soul	Released: 30 March 2015; Label: Off Yer Rocka	—	—	—	
Twisted Love	Released: 4 September 2016; Label: Off Yer Rocka	—	—	—	
White Trash Blues	Released: 5 September 2017; Label: Off Yer Rocka	—	34	—	
Amazing Disgrace	Released: 5 April 2019; Label: Off Yer Rocka	—	—	—	
A Bit of What You Fancy (30th Anniversary Edition)	Released: 23 July 2021; Label: Off Yer Rocka	—	12	—	
Wardour Street	Released 1 November 2024; Label: Cadiz Music	—	37	—	
"—" denotes a recording that did not chart or was not released in that territory.

=== Live albums ===
- Live (Recorded Around the World) (EMI – 1990)
- Lost in Space (Snapper – 2000)
- 100% Live (Demolition – 2002)
- Quireboys Live (EMI – 2006) (Reissue of 1990 live album)
- Live in Glasgow (Jerkin Crocus – 2011)
- 35 & Live (Off yer Rocker – 2020)
- Orchestral Quireboys (Off yer Rocker – 2022)
- Live at Rockpalast 2007 & 1990 (Mig Music – 2025)

=== Compilation albums ===
- From Tooting to Barking (Griffin – 1994)
- Rock Champions (EMI – 2001)
- Masters of Rock – The Quireboys (EMI – 2002)
- Best of the Quireboys (EMI – 2008)

=== Singles ===
Year	Title	Chart positions			
Year	Title	CAN	US	US Main	UK
1988	"Mayfair"	–	–	–	95
1988	"There She Goes Again"	–	–	–	87
1989	"7 O'Clock"	41	–	15	36
1989	"Hey You"	82	–	–	14
1990	"I Don't Love You Anymore"	71	76	–	24
1990	"There She Goes Again" / "Misled"	–	–	–	37
1992	"Tramps and Thieves"	–	–	–	41
1993	"Brother Louie"	68	–	–	32
1993	"Last Time"	–	–	–	–
2005	"Tears in Heaven"	–	–	–	88
2008	"Blyth Spartans"	–	–	–	–
2012	"Biking for Bobby"	–	–	–	–
2013	"Too Much of a Good Thing"	–	–	–	–
2013	"Diamonds and Dirty Stones"	–	–	–	–
2015	"Gracie B"	–	–	–	–
2023	"Jeez Louise"	–	–	–	–
2024	"Raining Whisky"	–	–	–	–

=== Videography ===
- A Bit of What You Fancy (1990)
- Bitter, Sweet & Live (Live at The Town & Country Club, London) (1993)
- One More for the Road (Live at The Mean Fiddler, London) (2006)
- 35 & Live (Live at O2 The Forum, London) (2020)
- Orchestral Quireboys (Live at O2 The Forum, London) (2022)
