= The Swanvesta Social Club =

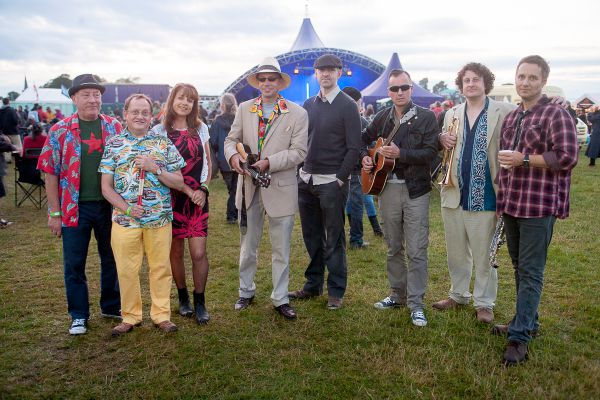
The Swanvesta Social Club

Swanvesta Social Club were founded in St Albans, and are a British Cuban-influenced group.

== Career ==
According to the St Albans Review newspaper the group models itself on the Buena Vista Social Club. They are most noted for their lively outdoor performances. Ray Cooper described them as "one of the most interesting live bands I have seen in ages!".

In 2007 The Swanvesta Social Club headlined the Exmoor Folk Festival and were described by folk journalist Rob Hopcott as "monumental", and appeared at the fringe of the St Albans International Organ Festival.

In 2008 they played alongside Oysterband at the Two Rivers Festival. That year they also released a salsa version of "I Predict a Riot" in 2008, on their first CD release. The CD was a mini album entitled Never Mind the Bongos. It featured a mixture of traditional Cuban songs, originals and Latin reinventions of contemporary pop songs.

In 2009 they played at the Two Rivers Festival, again alongside Seth Lakeman; The Leamington Peace Festival along with Attila the Stockbroker, 3 Daft Monkeys and Togfest at Bradwell Abbey. In July 2009 they released an EP, "Songs from the Latin Quarter", which included a cover version of the Max Martin song "...Baby One More Time" which was a featured song on Radio Verulam that year.

In July 2010, they played at the Rhythms Of The World Festival in Hitchin, along with Get Cape. Wear Cape. Fly, Glen Matlock and Hugh Cornwell. They returned to the festival in 2011 and launched the mainstage playing alongside Ska Cubano and The Selecter.

Their first full-length album, "The Inauthentic Sound of Cuba" was released on 24 July 2011. It featured versions of Guantanamera, Hasta Siempre and I Gotta Feeling.

In 2013 they played at The Acoustic Festival of Britain held at Uttoxeter Racecourse along with Fairport Convention, and Matt Cardle

In 2015 they released their second album "Live from the Latin Quarter" and appeared again at The Acoustic Festival Of Britain together with Hazel O'Connor and Paul Carrack. They also headlined the Rickmansworth Canal Festival

They performed for a third time at The Acoustic Festival of Britain in 2016 together with Midge Ure Judie Tzuke and Dean Friedman. The same year they played at the Lechlade Festival with The Proclaimers and Doctor and the Medics.

In 2018, they released their third album "a Chihuhua With a Paddle" and played at many uk festivals including The Bishop's Stortford music festival along with Wilko Johnson, Bearded Theory with Robert Plant, and Jake Bugg, and returned to Lechlade Music Festival supporting Scouting for Girls.

== Soundclick ==
The band has twice topped the world Cuban Chart on the Soundclick social website. In November 2007 with Ella Muchacha (Number 13 in the World Latin chart); and in June 2009 with Quema (Number 23 in the World Latin Chart).
