= A Bit of What You Fancy =

Studio album by the Quireboys
- Released: 29 January 1990
- Genres: Hard rock; pop rock; hair metal
- Length: 48:27
- Label: EMI
- Producers: George Tutko; Jim Cregan

The Quireboys chronology
A Bit of What You Fancy (1990)	Bitter Sweet & Twisted (1993)

Singles from A Bit of What You Fancy
- 1. "7 O'Clock" Released: October 1989; 2. "Hey You" Released: December 1989; 3. "I Don't Love You Anymore" Released: March 1990; 4. "There She Goes Again" Released: August 1990

Professional ratings
Review scores
Source	Rating
AllMusic	4/5 stars
The Encyclopedia of Popular Music	3/5 stars

A Bit of What You Fancy is the debut studio album by the English rock band the Quireboys. It was released by EMI on 29 January 1990, and produced by George Tutko and Jim Cregan.

A Bit of What You Fancy remains the Quireboys' most commercially successful album. It peaked at no. 2 on the UK Albums Chart and was certified Gold for sales of over 100,000 units. The album was preceded by four charting singles, with "Hey You" becoming the most successful. The album features contributions from session drummer and former King Crimson member Ian Wallace.

In 2021, the band released a rerecorded version of the album to mark its 30th anniversary.

== Track listing ==
All songs written by Spike and Guy Bailey, except where noted otherwise.

No.	Title	Writer(s)	Length
1.	"7 O'Clock"		3:38
2.	"Man on the Loose"		4:15
3.	"Whippin' Boy"	Spike, Bailey, Willie Dowling	4:28
4.	"Sex Party"		2:36
5.	"Sweet Mary Ann"		3:38
6.	"I Don't Love You Anymore"		5:01
7.	"Hey You"		3:20
8.	"Misled"		3:35
9.	"Long Time Comin'"		3:26
10.	"Roses & Rings"		4:12
11.	"There She Goes Again"		2:56
12.	"Take Me Home"		4:11

The Japanese release of A Bit of What You Fancy included 2 bonus tracks "Pretty Girls" and "How Do You Feel".

20th Anniversary Edition Bonus Tracks
No.	Title	Length
13.	"7 O'Clock" (demo)	2:48
14.	"Man on the Loose" (demo)	2:35
15.	"I Don't Love You Anymore" (demo)	4:35
16.	"Hey You" (demo)	2:35
17.	"Misled" (demo)	2:47
18.	"Long Time Comin'" (demo)	3:04
19.	"Roses & Rings" (demo)	2:58
20.	"Take Me Home" (demo)	4:21

== Charts ==
Chart (1990)	Peak position
Canada Top Albums/CDs (RPM)	23
German Albums (Offizielle Top 100)	41
Japanese Albums (Oricon)	15
Swedish Albums (Sverigetopplistan)	11
Swiss Albums (Schweizer Hitparade)	20
UK Albums (Official Charts)	2
US Billboard 200	111

== Certifications and sales ==
Region	Certification	Certified units/sales
Canada (Music Canada)	Platinum	100,000^{^}
United Kingdom (BPI)	Gold	100,000^{^}
^{^} Shipments figures based on certification alone.

== Personnel ==
Credits adapted from the liner notes of A Bit of What You Fancy.

The Quireboys

- Spike – vocals
- Guy Bailey – guitar
- Guy Griffin – guitar
- Nigel Mogg – bass
- Ian Wallace – drums
- Chris Johnstone – keyboards

Additional musicians

- Myrna Mathews – background vocals
- Clydene Jackson – background vocals
- Julia Walters – background vocals
- Kevin Savigan – string arrangement
- Lee Thornberg – brass

== Singles ==
- "7 O'Clock" (1989) UK No. 36
- "Hey You" (1989) UK No. 14
- "I Don't Love You Anymore" (1990) UK No. 24
- "There She Goes Again" (1990) UK No. 37
