= 100% Pure Frankie Miller =

Studio album by Spike
- Released: 8 September 2014
- Genre: Hard rock
- Label: Cargo

Spike chronology
So-Called Friends (2008)	100% Pure Frankie Miller (2014)

Singles from 100% Pure Frankie Miller
- 1. "Cocaine" Released: 1 September 2014

100% Pure Frankie Miller is the fourth studio album by English musician Spike, and a tribute album to Scottish singer-songwriter Frankie Miller. It was released on 8 September 2014 by Cargo Records. The lead single from the album, "Cocaine", was released on 1 September 2014.

== Release and promotion ==
100% Pure Frankie Miller is a tribute album to the Scottish singer-songwriter of the same name. The album includes tracks (discounting "Bottle of Whiskey") written by Miller that were previously unreleased.

== Critical response ==
Louella Deville of PlanetMosh gave the album five out of five stars, describing it as "a stunning tribute to keep Frankie’s music alive." She drew vocal comparisons between Spike and Rod Stewart, saying "if I hadn't known it was Spike I may have thought Rod was collaborating with them." She also noted Spike's duet with Bonnie Tyler, describing her voice as the female equivalent of Spike's. "It’s difficult to tell in places which was Spike singing and which was Bonnie. I doubt even Spike’s own mother could tell them apart!"

== Track listing ==
100% Pure Frankie Miller — Standard edition
No.	Title	Writer(s)	Length
1.	"The Brooklyn Bridge"	Frankie Miller; Scott English	3:55
2.	"Cocaine"	Miller	3:24
3.	"I'm Losing You"	Miller	4:12
4.	"Intensive Care"	Miller; Charles H. Jones	3:39
5.	"Fortune" (with Bonnie Tyler)	Miller; English	3:45
6.	"Amsterdam Woman"	Miller	3:02
7.	"Other Side of Town"	Miller; Mac Rebennack	4:09
8.	"Cheap Hotel"	Miller	3:27
9.	"Cold, Cold Nights"	Miller	2:41
10.	"Did You Ever Wanna Go Home"	Miller	3:33
11.	"Keepin' It All for You"	Miller	4:03
12.	"Bottle of Whiskey"	Miller	3:32

== Charts ==
Chart performance of 100% Pure Frankie Miller
Chart (2014)	Peak position
UK Independent Albums (OCC)	42

== Release history ==
Country	Date	Edition	Format(s)	Label
United Kingdom	8 September 2014	Standard	Digital download; CD	Cargo Records
