= Homewreckers & Heartbreakers =

Studio album by the Quireboys
- Released: 23 June 2008
- Genre: Rock blues rock acoustic
- Label: Jerkin' Crocus Promotions
- Producer: Nick Mailing & Guy Griffin

The Quireboys chronology
Well Oiled (2004)	Homewreckers & Heartbreakers (2008)	Halfpenny Dancer (2009)

Homewreckers & Heartbreakers is the fifth album by English rock band the Quireboys, released in 2008. The song 'Mona Lisa Smiled' is inspired by the life and death of Salvador Dalí and his wife Gala. It has been described as approaching the style of AC/DC.

It was reissued in 2018 commemorating its tenth anniversary with the addition of five live songs.

== Track listing ==
1. Love This Dirty Town
2. Mona Lisa Smiled
3. Louder
4. Fear Within the Lie
5. Blackwater
6. One for the Road
7. Late Nite Saturday Call
8. Hall of Shame
9. Take a Look at Yourself
10. Hello
11. Josephine
12. Louder (Reprise)

== Personnel ==
- Spike – vocals
- Guy Griffin – guitars, backing vocals
- Keith Weir – piano, keyboards, backing vocals
- Paul Guerin – guitars, slide guitar
- Jimi Crutchley - bass
- Pip Mailing - drums

=== Additional musicians ===
- Gerry Atkins - brass
- Ian Bufton - brass
- Mark Joley - fiddle
- Rob Bond - pedal steel
- Ben Haswell - mandolin
- Nick Mailing - additional bass
- Simon Law - melotron
- Cherry Lee Mewis - backing vocals
