= Day shapes =

Masthead signals showing vessel status

Day shapes are mast head signals visually indicating the status of a vessel to other vessels on navigable waters during daylight hours whether making-way, anchored, or aground. These signals consist of a set of simple geometric shapes—ball, cylinder, cone, and diamond—that are displayed, hung from a mast, in a prescribed manner to indicate a vessel's operational status; some of these signals may be somewhat involved. The meanings of the shapes are defined by the International Regulations for Preventing Collisions at Sea (ColRegs).

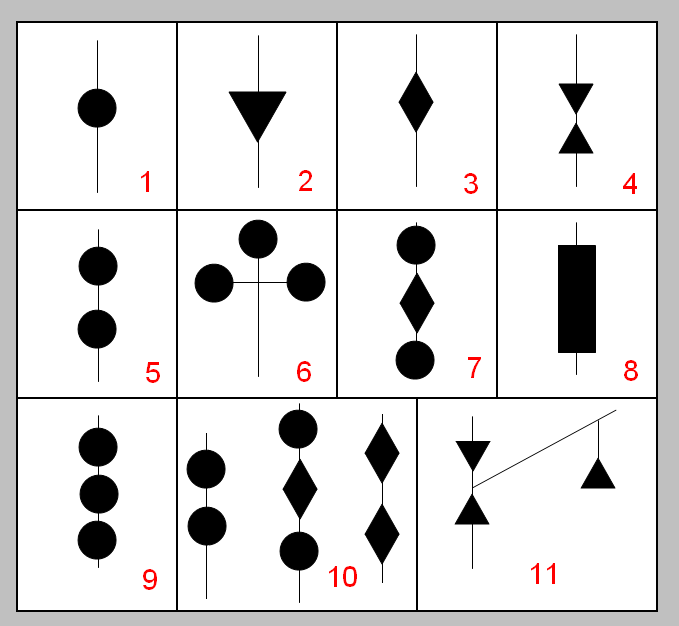
Day shapes from ColRegs. In this image, balls are depicted as circles, diamonds are depicted as rhombi, cones as triangles and cylinders as rectangles.

Day shapes are black in color and their sizes are determined by the ColRegs; for example, the size of the ball is not less than 0.6 metres (2.0 ft). The vertical distance between shapes is at least 1.5 metres (4.9 ft). Vessels of less than 20 metres (66 ft) length may use shapes of smaller size commensurate with the size of the vessel. Day shapes of standard and reduced sizes are both commercially available. Day shapes are commonly constructed from a lightweight frame covered with fabric and are designed to be collapsible for ease of storage.

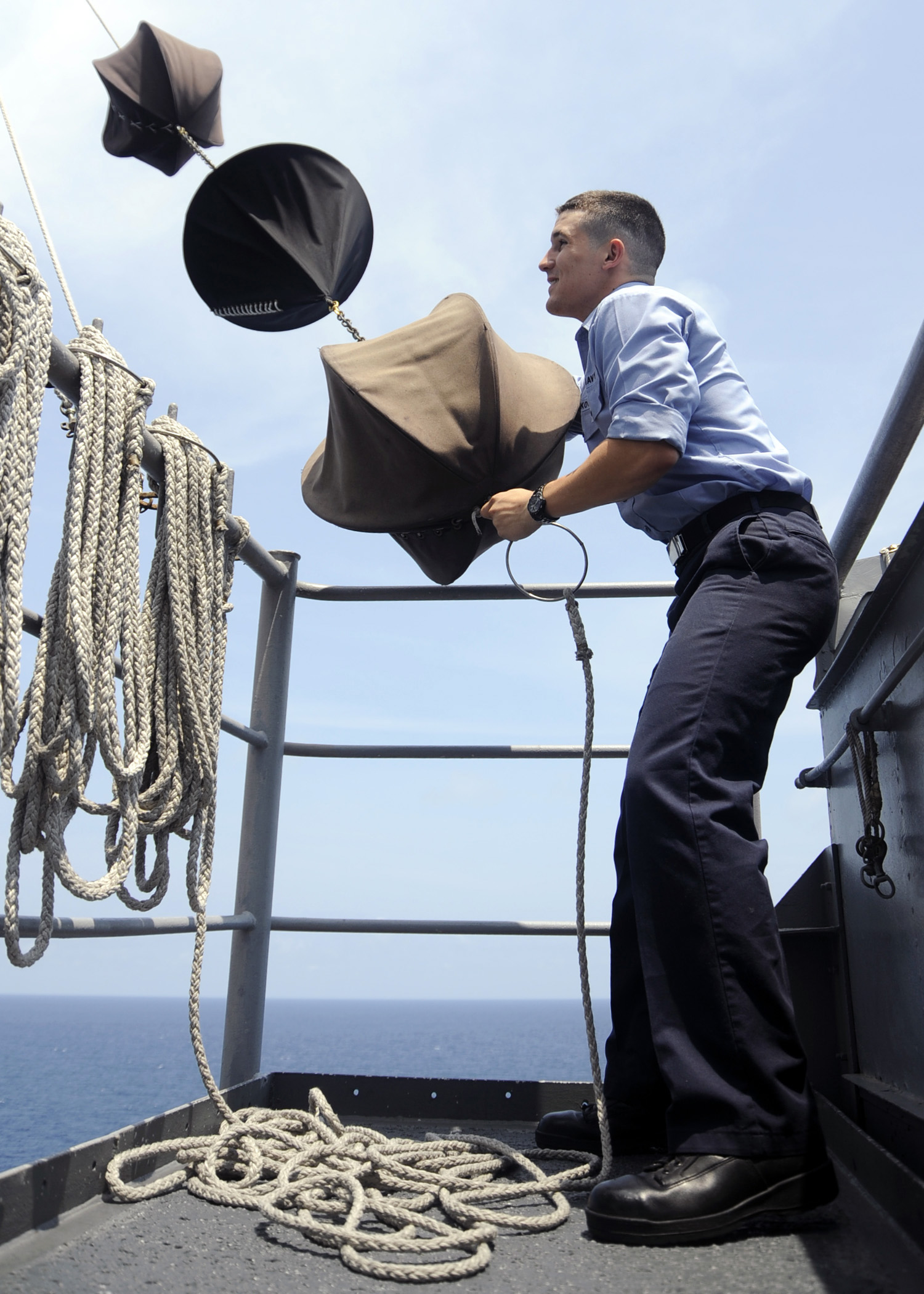
A US Navy sailor lowers day shapes "ball, diamond, ball", signaling the end of restricted maneuvering

Day shapes are designed to correspond to the various navigation lights required to be shown at night, and are required to be complied with by day from sunrise to sunset. The appropriate lights may also be displayed during the day at times of restricted visibility or other necessary circumstances. Vessels under 7 meters are generally not required to display day shapes even if they are required to display lights at night.

A square black flag displayed over the ball may be used as a distress signal.

Some of the most common signals (see Day shapes diagram):

Navigation status	Day shape	Restriction
1. Anchored	Ball	not required if < 7 m and where vessels normally do not navigate
2. Vessel under sail and power	Cone, apex down	
3. Vessel towing	Diamond	Tow > 200 m
3. Vessel being towed	Diamond	Tow > 200 m
4,11. Fishing (with restricted maneuvrability)	2 cones (apexes together)	> 20 m (extra cone: gear extending more than 150 metres in that direction)
5. Not under command	2 balls (vert. line)	> 12 m
6. Minesweeping	3 balls	
7,10. Restricted in ability to manoeuvre	ball, diamond, ball (2 diamonds - safe side to pass)	> 12 m (except dive boats)
8. Constrained by draft	Cylinder	
9. Aground	3 balls (vert. line)	> 12 m

== See also ==
- International Maritime Organization
- International Regulations for Preventing Collisions at Sea
- Marine navigation lights
- US Coast Guard
