= HeKz =

British progressive metal band

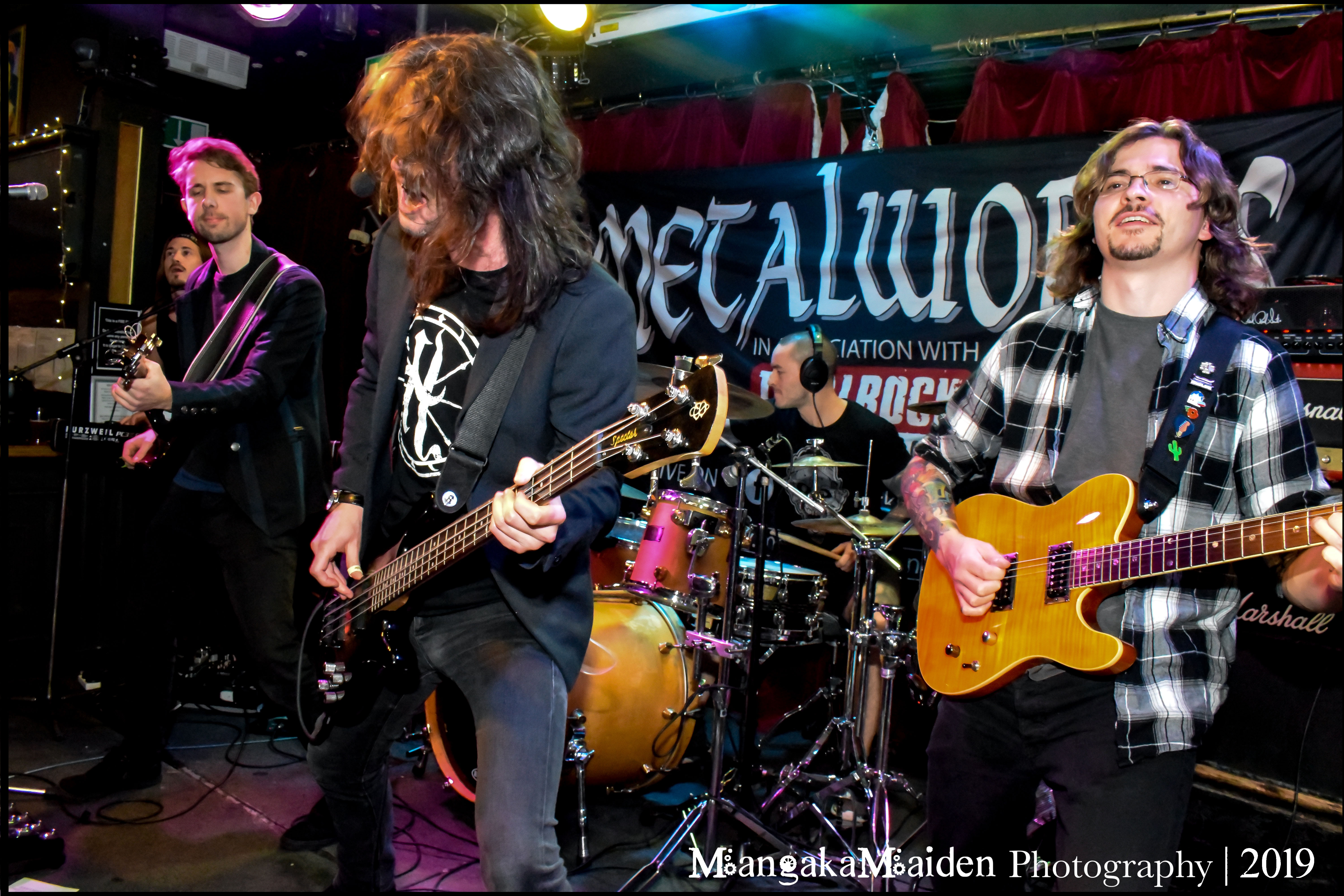
- HeKz live in 2019

Background information
- Origin: England
- Genre: Progressive metal
- Years active: 2005–present
- Members: Matt Young; Tolis Zavaliaris; Lucia La Rezza; James Wise
- Past members: Alastair "Al" Beveridge; Tom Smith; James Messenger; Danny Young; Kirk Brandham; Mark Bogert; Pieter Beemsterboer; Moyano el Buffalo; Jerry Sadowski
- Website: www.hekztheband.com

HeKz is a British progressive metal band founded in 2005 by frontman and bass player Matt Young.

== History ==
The band was formed in 2005 when Matt Young was still in middle school. Seven years and after few lineup changes, their first albumTabula Rasa was released in 2012.

Later that year, keyboardist James Messenger joined HeKz as a fifth member, with the band then consisting of Matt Young on bass and vocals, Alastair Beveridge and Tom Smith on guitars, Messenger on keyboards and Kirk Brandham on drums. With this line-up, they released in 2014 their second album Caerus, featuring cellist Audrey Riley. Four years later the band released Invicta in April 2018.

In March 2021, after a lineup change, the frontman Matt Young announced HeKz's fourth album, Terra Nova, a conceptual effort released with the collaboration of guitarist Mark Bogert, keyboardist Pieter Beemsterboer, drummer Moyano el Buffalo and Ukrainian violinist Irina Markevich. The double album, which will be released in November 2023 will also feature guest performances by keyboardist Adam Holzman.

== Members ==
=== Current members ===
- Matt Young – lead vocals, bass guitar (2005 – present)
- Tolis Zavaliaris - guitar, backing vocals (2024 - present)
- Lucia La Rezza - violin, backing vocals (2023 - present)
- James Wise - drums (2024 - present)

=== Past members ===
- Alastair "Al" Beveridge – guitar (2008-2021)
- Tom Smith – guitar (2011-2021)
- James Messenger – keyboards (2012–2018)
- Danny Young – guitar (2009-?)
- Kirk Brandham – drums (2008-2021)
- Moyano el Buffalo – drums (2020–present, occasional session appearances)
- Jerry Sadowski - drums (2023 - 2024, occasional session appearances)
- Mark Bogert – guitar (2021–present)

== Discography ==
=== Studio albums ===
- Tabula Rasa (2011)
- Caerus (2014)
- Invicta (2018)
- Terra Nova (2023)
- Qisma (2026)
