= Well Oiled (The Quireboys album) =

Well-Oiled

Studio album by the Quireboys
- Released: 4 May 2004
- Studio: Henhouse Studios
- Genre: Rock hard rock
- Length: 39:58
- Label: SPV
- Producer: Nick Mailing

The Quireboys chronology
This Is Rock'n'Roll (2001)	Well-Oiled (2004)	Homewreckers & Heartbreakers (2008)

Well Oiled is rock band the Quireboys's fourth studio album, released in 2004. It is the second album recorded since the band re-united, following on from This Is Rock'N'Roll, and their first for the Steamhammer label.

Allmusic reviewer Greg Prato gave it three and a half stars, stating "their bluesy, brawlin', whiskey-soaked style remains very much intact throughout". Blabbermouth.net gave it 7.5 out of 10, calling it "Good Stuff". It also received a positive review from the Southern Daily Echo, with Ali Masud calling it "A case of if it ain't broke don't fix it.".

== Track listing ==
1. "Good to See You"
2. "The Finer Stuff"
3. "Lorraine Lorraine"
4. "Too Familiar"
5. "You've Got a Nerve"
6. "What's Your Name"
7. "Sweet as the Rain"
8. "The Last Fence"
9. "Black Mariah"

== Band ==
- Spike – vocals
- Guy Griffin – guitar
- Paul Guerin – guitar
- Nigel Mogg – bass
- Pip Mailing – drums
- Keith Weir – keyboards

=== Additional musicians ===
- Steve 'Smoothy' Damon – harmonica
- Danni Nicholls – backing vocals
