= Black Ball Line =

Black Ball Line or Blackball Line may refer to:

- Black Ball Line (trans-Atlantic packet), a fleet of packet ships running between Liverpool and New York, the first scheduled trans-Atlantic service, founded in 1817
- Black Ball Line (Liverpool), a fleet of packet ships running between Liverpool and Australia owned by James Baines & Co, founded in 1852
- Puget Sound Navigation Company, a fleet of ferries on Puget Sound and the Strait of Georgia in British Columbia and Washington known as the Black Ball Line, founded in 1898
