= Blackball (surfing) =

Flag indicating to clear the water

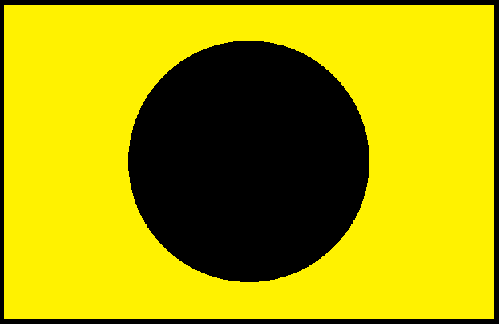
Blackball flag

A blackball is a flag on a lifeguard tower or other highly visible area to show surfers that they must clear the water. A blackball flag is represented with a black circle in the center of a yellow or red flag; a yellow background being the most common. The flag is designed to protect swimmers from potentially harmful surfboards that may be moving at velocities after a "wipe out" from a wave. Swimmers maintain that the policy is a safety measure, while many surfers contend that blackball is an attempt to cull the in-water population in certain zones, providing preferential treatment to swimmers over surfers.

Newport Beach, California has regular headlines regarding the use of blackball and dedicates a section of their official government site to the issue. US House Representative Dana Rohrabacher and Southern California politician Michael B. Glenn have both made campaign issues out of the blackball implementation. Rohrabacher noted that Newport Beach was the only city who practiced blackball and also did not have a dedicated area for surf use.
