= Blackballed (band) =

English rock band

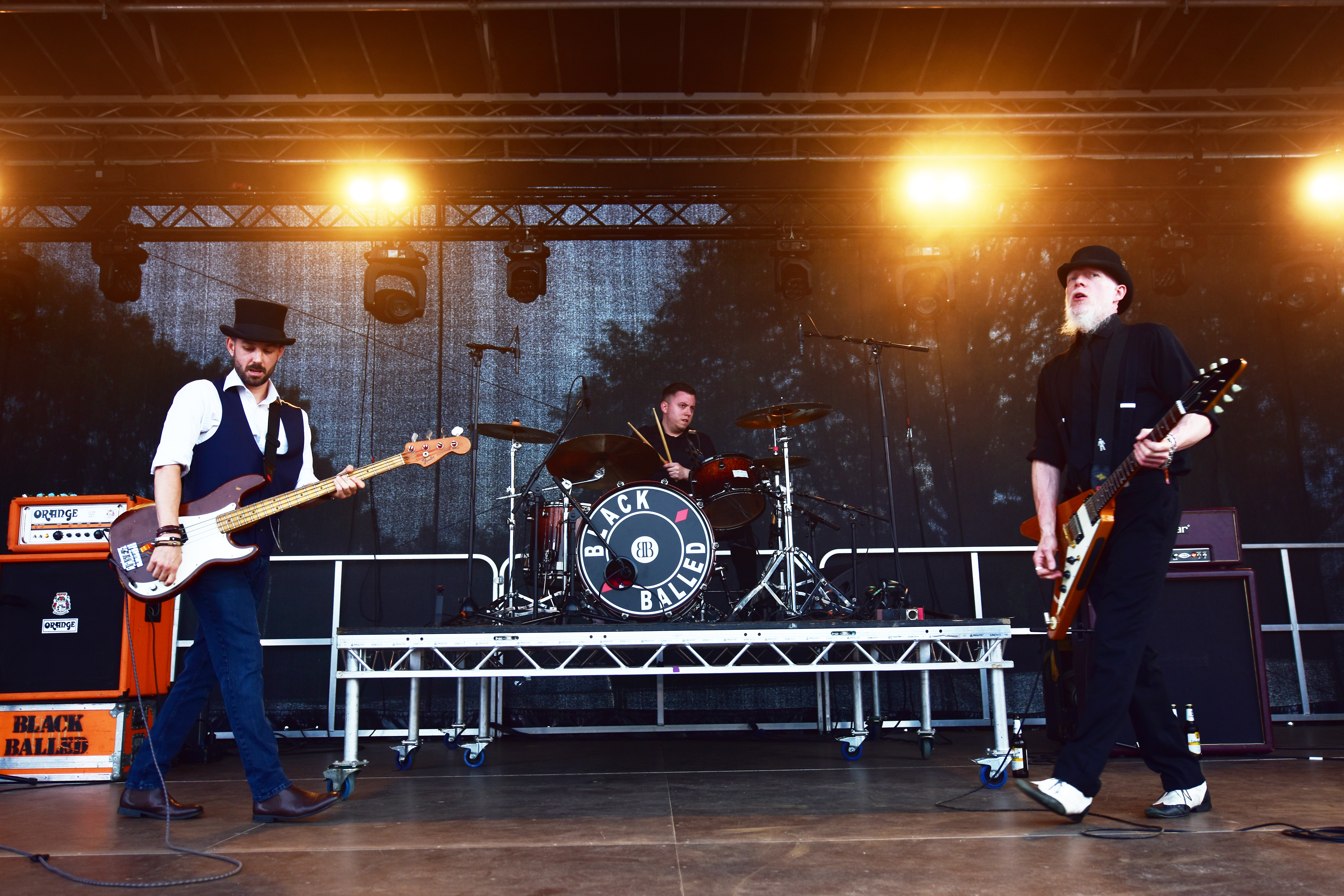
- Blackballed playing at Burg Herzberg Festival in 2024.

Background information
- Origin: Manchester, England
- Genres: Rock, Blues rock
- Years active: 2012–present
- Members: Marshall Gill; Alex Whitehead; Tom Wibberley
- Past members: Leon Gill
- Website: blackballedband.org

Blackballed are an English rock band from Manchester. Formed in 2012 by then-New Model Army guitarist Marshall Gill, his brother Leon and Tom Wibberley, the band have toured extensively in the UK, including well-known festivals such as Beautiful Days and Bearded Theory, and have also played in Germany, Luxembourg and the Netherlands. They have released three albums, Colossus in 2014, Fulton's Point in 2017. and Elephant in the Room in 2020.

== Discography ==
=== Albums ===
- Colossus (2014)
- Fulton's Point (2017)
- Elephant in the Room (2020)

=== EPs ===
- Blackballed (2013)
- Broken Bones (2016)

== Members ==
- Marshall Gill - Vocals, Guitar
- Alex Whitehead - Drums
- Tom Wibberley - Bass Guitar
