= Spike (musician) =

English rock singer and songwriter

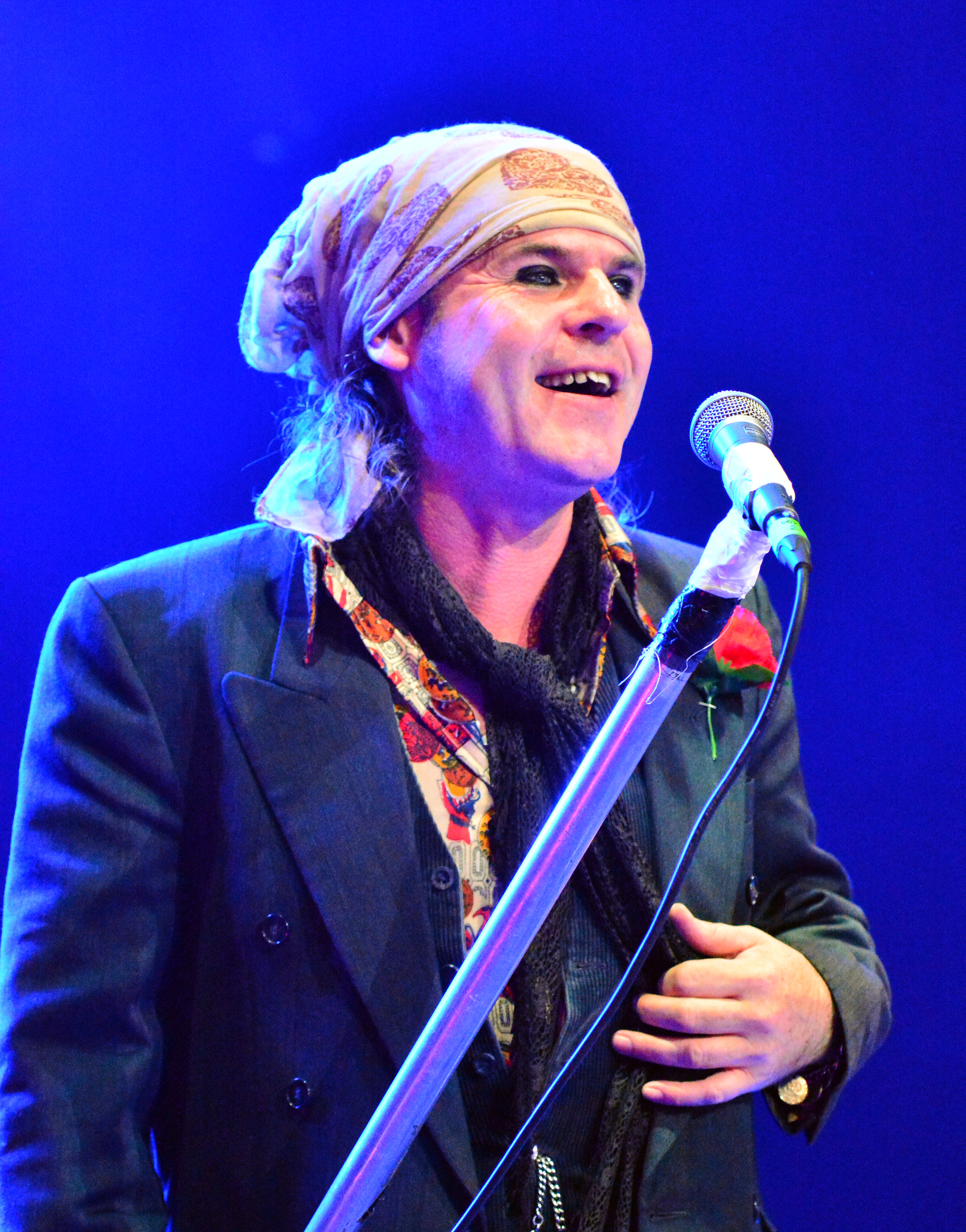
- Spike in 2015

Background information
- Also known as: Spike Gray
- Born: Jonathan Francis Gray; 4 February 1966 (age 60); Newcastle upon Tyne, England
- Origin: Haltwhistle, Northumberland, England
- Genres: Hard rock, blues rock, glam metal, glam punk
- Occupation: Singer-songwriter
- Instruments: Vocals, harmonica, guitar
- Years active: 1984–present
- Labels: Cargo; Demolition; Jerkin' Crocus

Jonathan Francis Gray (born 4 February 1966), known professionally as Spike, or Spike Gray, is an English singer-songwriter and founding member of the British rock band the Quireboys, for whom he performs as lead singer and has released 13 studio albums. He is recognised for his raspy voice which led to comparisons with Rod Stewart.

As a solo performer, Spike has collaborated with Tyla of The Dogs D'Amour, and released five solo studio albums. In March 2022, fellow Quireboys members claimed that Spike had been fired from the band, which Spike disputed. Spike proceeded to form a new version of the band, with his ex-bandmates changing their name.

== Career ==
Jonathan Gray was born in Newcastle upon Tyne and grew up in Northern England. At age 17, he moved down to London where he formed the rock band the Quireboys with Guy Bailey in 1984. After various tours and singles, Spike with the Quireboys released their debut album A Bit of What You Fancy (1990), which went to number two on the UK Albums Chart. The band gained significant success, but their second album Bitter Sweet & Twisted (1993) did not quite have the impact of the first.

After the Quireboys split up in 1993, he played in the United States, in Los Angeles, California, with a band called God's Hotel. He also sang lead vocals on a cover of Hank Williams's country classic "Hey Good Lookin'" with C.C. DeVille from the American glam-metal band Poison, for the soundtrack of the comedy film Son in Law (1993) starring Pauly Shore.

Spike decided to record in other projects; the first was in 1994 with Darrell Bath of the English rock and roll band the Dogs D'Amour. The recording, Take Out Some Insurance, was an album of covers, featuring songs from old blues artists, and was released under the artist name Spike an' Darrell.

Soon after, Spike moved back to Newcastle and, in 1996, he recorded with another member of the Dogs D'Amour – this time it was frontman Tyla, with whom he recorded the album Flagrantly Yours, under the artist name Spike and Tyla's Hot Knives.

In 1998, Spike recorded his first solo album Blue Eyed Soul.

The Quireboys reformed in 2001 with a new line-up and have released six new albums since that time.

Spike's second solo studio album, It's a Treat to Be Alive, was released in 2005, followed by So Called Friends in 2008.

Spike was involved in a fracas with German rock guitarist Michael Schenker in November 2000. This happened after a show at the Newcastle City Hall by the English heavy-metal and hard-rock band UFO. Schenker later admitted he caused the brawl, and refused to blame Spike. The Quireboys have since played on the same bill as the hard-rock band Michael Schenker Group.

In 2006, Spike released his second studio album It's a Treat to Be Alive through Demolition Records. It was described by the Belfast Telegraph as a "more than decent collection", noting its "bluesy" influences.

In 2007, Spike became part of Damage Control, a British supergroup formed by guitarist Robin George, UFO bassist Pete Way and Chris Slade, former drummer with the Australian hard-rock band AC/DC. The group released a self-titled album on Cargo Records which was generally well received.

Over the years, Spike has also provided vocals for a number of songs on various American rock tribute albums, specifically: the power ballad "Don't Cry" on Uncivil War, a tribute album to Guns N' Roses; a cover of the rock band Styx's song "Lady" on the album A Tribute to Styx; rock musician Ted Nugent's "Need You Bad" on the album The World's Greatest Tribute to Ted Nugent; and the rock band Bon Jovi's ballad "Living in Sin" on the album Covered Dead or Alive. Spike also collaborated with the American electronica artist David Madden (also sometimes known as DJ Webern and Nonnon) on a version of the English heavy-metal band Judas Priest's song "Rock Forever" for An Industrial Tribute to Judas Priest.

Spike is known to have contributed backing vocals on the following recordings:

- Gang Bang (1997) – an extended-play (EP) album by the Gangbang Band (also featuring members of the Finnish hard-rock band Hanoi Rocks and the Babysitters); a live session
- Company Of Wolves (1990) – an album by the American rock band of the same name
- "Night of the Cadillacs" – on the Cuts EP (1992) by the American hard-rock band L.A. Guns
- Rock & A Hard Place (2007) – an album by the English heavy-metal band the Handsome Beasts
- "Good Times" – on the Cookin' EP (2009) and "On the Sunny Side Again" – on the Set Fire to It All album (2012) by the Swedish rock band Diamond Dogs

== Discography ==
This discography documents the studio albums Spike has been a part of in various projects.

=== The Quireboys ===
- 1990 – A Bit of What You Fancy – UK No. 2
- 1993 – Bitter Sweet & Twisted – UK No. 31
- 2001 – This Is Rock'n'Roll
- 2004 – Well Oiled
- 2008 – Homewreckers & Heartbreakers
- 2009 – Halfpenny Dancer
- 2010 – Halfpenny Dancer Live
- 2011 – Live in Glasgow
- 2013 – Beautiful Curse
- 2014 – Black Eyed Sons
- 2015 – St. Cecilia and the Gypsy Soul
- 2016 – Twisted Love
- 2017 – White Trash Blue
- 2019 – Amazing Disgrace
- 2020 – Live & Alive 35
- 2021 – A Bit of What You Fancy (30th anniversary re-recording)
- 2024 – Wardour Street

=== God's Hotel ===
- 1997 – God's Hotel

=== Spike an' Darrell ===
- 1995 – Take Out Some Insurance

=== Spike and Tyla's Hot Knives ===
- 1996 – Flagrantly Yours
- 2005 – Flagrantly Electrically Acoustically Yours
- 2016 – The Sinister Indecisions of Frankie Gray and Jimmy Pallas

=== Damage Control ===
- 2007 – Damage Control

=== Solo ===
- 1998 – Blue Eyed Soul
- 1998 – Live in London
- 2005 – It's a Treat to Be Alive
- 2008 – So-Called Friends
- 2014 – 100% Pure Frankie Miller

== See also ==
- List of people from Newcastle upon Tyne
