= List of Foghat members =

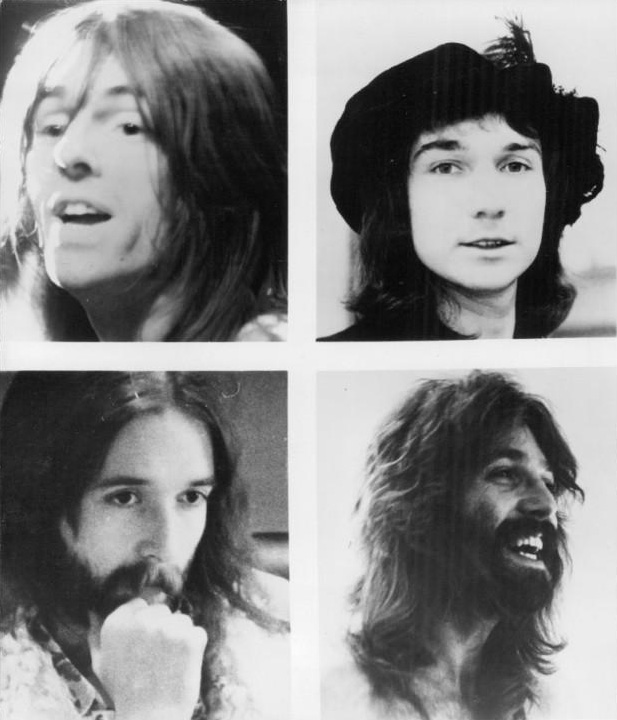
Foghat in 1975, clockwise from top left: "Lonesome" Dave Peverett, Tony Stevens, Roger Earl and Rod Price.

Foghat are an English blues rock band from London. Formed in January 1971, the group originally included lead vocalist and rhythm guitarist "Lonesome" Dave Peverett, bassist and backing vocalist Tony Stevens, drummer Roger Earl (all recently departed from Savoy Brown) and lead guitarist Rod Price (formerly of Black Cat Bones). After four studio albums, Stevens left the band in late 1974 due to their heavy touring commitments, with multi-instrumentalist Nick Jameson (who had produced the group's fourth album Rock and Roll Outlaws) taking his place. By early 1976, Jameson had been replaced by Craig MacGregor. Price was the second original member of the band to leave in November 1980, following the touring cycle for their ninth studio album Tight Shoes. He was replaced the following year by Erik Cartwright.

MacGregor left the band in 1982 and was replaced by the returning Jameson. Kenny Aaronson took over in 1983, followed by Rob Alter, before MacGregor returned for a brief second tenure. By the end of 1984, Peverett had left to return to England, marking a temporary hiatus for the band. Earl, MacGregor and Cartwright continued performing under the name The Knee Tremblers with keyboardist and vocalist Jon Roberge, although by 1986 they had reverted to the Foghat moniker, adding new frontman Eric Burgeson. MacGregor had left again by the end of the year to pursue a solo career, with Cartwright's brother Brett and later Jeff Howell serving as his subsequent replacements. Burgeson was replaced by Phil Nudelman in 1988, who was later replaced by Billy Davis. Dave Crigger joined on bass in 1990.

In 1993, the original lineup of Foghat reunited for the first time since 1975. They released the band's first studio album in more than ten years, Return of the Boogie Men, the following year. The lineup remained stable until 1999, when Price left and was replaced by former Molly Hatchet guitarist Bryan Bassett. Peverett died on 7 February 2000 due to complications with cancer, after first being diagnosed in 1998. He was later replaced by former Humble Pie frontman Charlie Huhn, who was chosen by Peverett prior to his death. Stevens remained until early 2005, when he was replaced by the returning MacGregor. Price died on 22 March 2005 due to head trauma suffered as a result of a fall down a stairway. MacGregor was diagnosed with lung cancer in 2015 and died on 9 February 2018; Rodney O'Quinn replaced the bassist in 2015 and continues to perform with the band.

The lineup of Earl, Bassett, Huhn and O'Quinn would go on to record a live record in November 2019 called 8 Days on the Road. The album was released in July 2021.

In January 2022, lead singer Charlie Huhn retired. Scott Holt, formerly a guitarist for Buddy Guy, became the new lead singer and guitarist. Holt had previously lent his vocals for Under the Influence and was lead vocalist in Foghat side project Earl & the Agitators.

== Members ==
=== Current ===
Image	Name	Years active	Instruments	Release contributions
	Roger Earl	1971–1984; 1993–present	drums; percussion	all Foghat releases
	Bryan Bassett	1999–present	lead guitar; backing vocals	all Foghat releases from Family Joules (2003) onwards
	Rodney O'Quinn	2015–present	bass; backing and lead vocals	Under the Influence (2016); Live at the Belly Up (2017)
	Scott Holt	2022–present	lead vocals; rhythm guitar	Under the Influence (2016); Sonic Mojo (2023)

=== Former ===
Image	Name	Years active	Instruments	Release contributions
	"Lonesome" Dave Peverett	1971–1984; 1993–2000 (died 2000)	lead vocals; rhythm guitar	all Foghat releases from Foghat (1972) to King Biscuit (1999)
	Rod Price	1971–1980; 1993–1999 (died 2005)	lead guitar; slide guitar; backing vocals	all Foghat releases from Foghat (1972) to Tight Shoes (1980); Return of the Boogie Men (1994); Road Cases (1998); King Biscuit (1999)
	Tony Stevens	1971–1975; 1993–2005	bass; backing vocals	all Foghat releases from Foghat (1972) to Rock and Roll Outlaws (1974); Return of the Boogie Men (1994); Road Cases (1998); Family Joules (2003)
	Nick Jameson	1975–1976; 1982–1983	bass; keyboards; backing vocals; rhythm guitar	Fool for the City (1975); Live (1977); Girls to Chat & Boys to Bounce (1981); In the Mood for Something Rude (1982); Zig-Zag Walk (1983); Return of the Boogie Men (1994); King Biscuit (1999)
	Craig MacGregor	1976–1982; 1984; 2005–2015 (died 2018)	bass; backing vocals	all Foghat releases from Night Shift (1976) to Girls to Chat & Boys to Bounce (1981); King Biscuit (1999); all releases from Live II (2007) *Under the Influence (2016)
	Erik Cartwright	1981–1984 (died 2017)	lead guitar; backing vocals	Girls to Chat & Boys to Bounce (1981); In the Mood for Something Rude (1982); Zig-Zag Walk (1983)
	Kenny Aaronson	1983	bass	none
	Rob Alter	1983–1984	bass	none
	Charlie Huhn	2000–2022	lead vocals; rhythm guitar	all Foghat releases from Family Joules (2003) onwards

== Roger Earl's Foghat/The Knee Tremblers members ==
Image	Name	Years active	Instruments	Release contributions
	Roger Earl	1984–1993	drums	
	Erik Cartwright	1984–1993 (died 2017)	lead guitar; backing vocals	
	Craig MacGregor	1984–1986 (died 2018)	bass; backing vocals	
	Jon Roberge	1984–1986	lead vocals; keyboards	
	Eric Burgeson	1986–1988	lead vocals; rhythm guitar	
	Brett Cartwright	1986–1989	bass	
	Phil Nudelman	1988–1990	lead vocals; rhythm guitar	
	Jeff Howell	1989–1992	bass	
	Billy Davis	1990–1993	lead vocals; rhythm guitar	
	Dave Crigger	1992–1993	bass	

== Lonesome Dave's Foghat members ==
Image	Name	Years active	Instruments	Release contributions
	"Lonesome" Dave Peverett	1990–1993 (died 2000)	lead vocals; rhythm guitar	
	Bryan Bassett	1990–1993	lead guitar; backing vocals	
	Eddie Zyne	1990–1993	drums	
	Stephen Dees	1990–1991	bass	
	Riff West	1991–1993	bass	
	Rod Price	1990–1993 (occasional guest appearances) (died 2005)	lead guitar; slide guitar; backing vocals	

== Lineups ==
Period	Members	Releases
January 1971 – February 1975	Dave Peverett – lead vocals, rhythm guitar; Rod Price – lead guitar, slide guitar; Tony Stevens – bass, backing vocals; Roger Earl – drums, percussion	Foghat (1972); Foghat (1973); Energized (1974); Rock and Roll Outlaws (1974)
February 1975 – March 1976	Dave Peverett – lead vocals, rhythm guitar; Rod Price – lead guitar, slide guitar; Nick Jameson – bass, keyboards, backing vocals; Roger Earl – drums, percussion	Fool for the City (1975)
March 1976 – November 1980	Dave Peverett – lead vocals, rhythm guitar; Rod Price – lead guitar, slide guitar, backing vocals; Craig MacGregor – bass, backing vocals; Roger Earl – drums, percussion	Night Shift (1976); Live (1977); Stone Blue (1978); Boogie Motel (1979); Tight Shoes (1980); Decades Live (2003)
1981–1982	Dave Peverett – lead vocals, rhythm guitar; Erik Cartwright – lead guitar, backing vocals; Craig MacGregor – bass, backing vocals; Roger Earl – drums, percussion	Girls to Chat & Boys to Bounce (1981)
1982–1983	Dave Peverett – lead vocals, rhythm guitar; Erik Cartwright – lead guitar, backing vocals; Nick Jameson – bass, keyboards, backing vocals; Roger Earl – drums, percussion	In the Mood for Something Rude (1982); Zig-Zag Walk (1983)
1983	Dave Peverett – lead vocals, rhythm guitar; Erik Cartwright – lead guitar, backing vocals; Roger Earl – drums, percussion; Kenny Aaronson – bass	none
1983–1984	Dave Peverett – lead vocals, rhythm guitar; Erik Cartwright – lead guitar, backing vocals; Roger Earl – drums, percussion; Rob Alter – bass	none
1984	Dave Peverett – lead vocals, rhythm guitar; Erik Cartwright – lead guitar, backing vocals; Roger Earl – drums, percussion; Craig McGregor – bass, backing vocals	
1984–1986 (as The Knee Tremblers)	Erik Cartwright – guitar, backing vocals; Jim Robarge – keyboards, vocals; Roger Earl – drums; Craig McGregor – bass, backing vocals	
1986 (as Roger Earl's Foghat)	Eric Burgeson – lead vocals, rhythm guitar; Erik Cartwright – lead guitar, backing vocals; Roger Earl – drums; Craig McGregor – bass, backing vocals	
1986–1988 (Roger Earl's Foghat)	Eric Burgeson – lead vocals, rhythm guitar; Erik Cartwright – lead guitar, backing vocals; Roger Earl – drums; Brett Cartwright – bass	
1988–1989 (Roger Earl's Foghat)	Phil Nudelman – lead vocals, rhythm guitar; Erik Cartwright – lead guitar, backing vocals; Roger Earl – drums; Brett Cartwright – bass	
1989–1990 (Roger Earl's Foghat)	Phil Nudelman – lead vocals, rhythm guitar; Erik Cartwright – lead guitar, backing vocals; Roger Earl – drums; Jeff Howell – bass	
1990–1992 (Roger Earl's Foghat)	Billy Davis – lead vocals, rhythm guitar; Erik Cartwright – lead guitar, backing vocals; Roger Earl – drums; Jeff Howell – bass	
1990–1991 (Lonesome Dave's Foghat)	Dave Peverett – lead vocals, rhythm guitar; Bryan Bassett – lead guitar, backing vocals; Eddie Zyne – drums; Stephen Dees – bass	
1991–1993 (Lonesome Dave's Foghat)	Dave Peverett – lead vocals, rhythm guitar; Bryan Bassett – lead guitar, backing vocals; Eddie Zyne – drums; Riff West – bass	
1992–1993 (Roger Earl's Foghat)	Billy Davis – lead vocals, rhythm guitar; Erik Cartwright – lead guitar, backing vocals; Roger Earl – drums; Dave Crigger – bass	
1993–1999 (original line-up reunion)	Dave Peverett – lead vocals, rhythm guitar; Rod Price – lead guitar, backing vocals; Tony Stevens – bass, backing vocals; Roger Earl – drums, percussion	Return of the Boogie Men (1994)
1999 – February 2000	Dave Peverett – lead vocals, rhythm guitar; Bryan Bassett – lead guitar, backing vocals; Tony Stevens – bass, backing vocals; Roger Earl – drums, percussion	Decades Live (2003) – one track only
February 2000 – late 2005	Charlie Huhn – lead vocals, rhythm guitar; Bryan Bassett – lead guitar, backing vocals; Tony Stevens – bass, backing vocals; Roger Earl – drums, percussion	Family Joules (2003)
Late 2005 – August 2015	Charlie Huhn – lead vocals, rhythm guitar; Bryan Bassett – lead guitar, backing vocals; Craig MacGregor – bass, backing vocals; Roger Earl – drums, percussion	Live II (2007); Live at the Blues Warehouse (2009); Last Train Home (2010) (features Jeff Howell in place of MacGregor)
August 2015 – January 2022	Charlie Huhn – lead vocals, rhythm guitar; Bryan Bassett – lead guitar, backing vocals; Rodney O'Quinn – bass, backing vocals; Roger Earl – drums, percussion	Under the Influence (2016); Live at the Belly Up (2017)
January 2022 – present	Scott Holt – lead vocals, rhythm guitar; Bryan Bassett – lead guitar, backing vocals; Rodney O'Quinn – bass, backing vocals; Roger Earl – drums, percussion	Sonic Mojo (2023)
