= Decades Live =

Live album by Foghat
- Released: 2003
- Recorded: 1977–1996
- Genre: Rock, hard rock, blues rock
- Length: 2:15:42
- Label: Sanctuary Records
- Producer: Rich Tozzoli

Foghat chronology
| Family Joules (2003) | Decades Live (2003) | Foghat Live II (2007) |

Decades Live is the second live album by Foghat, released in 2003. It is the first live album by the band since 1977's Foghat Live. It contains live recordings of the band, featuring different lineups, from between 1977 and 1996.

== Track listing ==
Disc 1

1. "Louisiana Blues" (McKinley Morganfield) – 5:09
2. "Drivin' Wheel" (Dave Peverett, Rod Price) – 6:53
3. "Motel Shaker" (Nick Jameson, Peverett, Price) – 4:56
4. "Stone Blue" (Peverett) – 7:54
5. "Nothin' But Trouble" (Peverett, Price) – 5:46
6. "Honey Hush" (Big Joe Turner) – 8:12
7. "It Hurts Me Too" (Elmore James, Mel London) – 9:12
8. "Sweet Home Chicago" (Robert Johnson) – 9:10
9. "I Just Want to Make Love to You/Satisfaction/Who Do You Love?" (Bo Diddley, Willie Dixon, Mick Jagger, Keith Richards) – 16:07

Disc 2

1. "Fool for the City" (Peverett) – 5:27
2. "Slow Ride" (Peverett) – 9:35
3. "I Ain't Got You" (Calvin Carter) – 4:32
4. "Chateau Laffite '59 Boogie" (Peverett, Price) – 14:41
5. "Loose Ends" (Peverett) – 5:01
6. "Eight Days on the Road" (Michael Gayle, Jerry Ragovoy) – 6:38
7. "Maybellene" (Chuck Berry) – 4:14
8. "Angel of Mercy" (Peverett) – 5:17
9. "It's Too Late" (Peverett, Price) – 6:58

== Personnel ==
Foghat

- Dave Peverett – lead vocals, guitar
- Bryan Bassett – guitar, vocals (disc 2, track 8)
- Rod Price – guitar, vocals (all other tracks)
- Craig MacGregor – bass, vocals (disc 2, tracks 3–7)
- Tony Stevens – bass, vocals (all other tracks)
- Roger Earl – drums

Production

- Jack Ball – production coordination
- Bob Coffee – engineer
- Carl Davino – engineer
- Colin Escott – liner notes
- Brian Mackewich – artwork, mastering, post mastering
- Gary Moscato – artwork, mastering, post mastering
- Rich Tozzoli – mastering, producer
