= Live II =

Live album by Foghat
- Released: June 2007
- Recorded: 2006
- Genre: Rock, blues rock, hard rock
- Length: 46:16
- Label: Locomotive Records
- Producer: Foghat

Foghat chronology
Decades Live (2003)	Live II (2007)	Live @ the Blues Warehouse (2009)

Professional ratings
Review scores
Source	Rating
AllMusic	3.5/5 stars

Live II is a live album by the rock band Foghat. It was recorded in 2006 and released on 26 June 2007. It is Foghat's follow up to their 1977 album Foghat Live.

== Track listing ==
=== Disc 1 ===
1. Night Shift
2. Take Me to the River
3. Stone Blue
4. Slippin' & Slidin'
5. Drivin' Wheel
6. Mumbo Jumbo
7. Terraplane Blues
8. Bang, Bang
9. Fool for the City

=== Disc 2 ===
1. California Blues
2. I Just Want to Make Love to You
3. Chateau Lafitte '59 Boogie
4. Slow Ride
5. Trouble, Trouble
6. Chevrolet
7. I'm a Rock N' Roller
8. I Feel Fine
9. My Babe
10. Self-Medicated
11. Road Fever

== Personnel ==
- Roger Earl - drums
- Craig MacGregor - bass
- Bryan Bassett - guitar
- Charlie Huhn - vocals, guitar
