= Foghat (disambiguation) =

Foghat is a British rock band.

Foghat may also refer to:

- Foghat (1972 album)
- Foghat (1973 album) or Rock and Roll
