= Craig MacGregor =

American bassist (1949–2018)

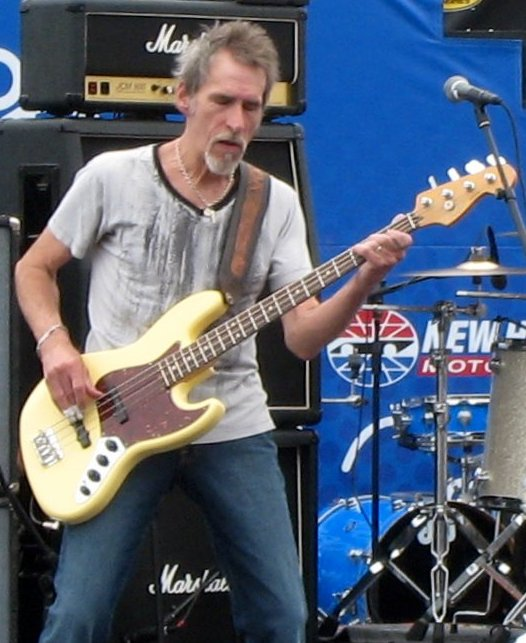
- MacGregor performing at New Hampshire Motor Speedway in 2010

Background information
- Born: September 13, 1949; Sioux City, Iowa, U.S.
- Died: February 9, 2018 (aged 68); Wyomissing, Pennsylvania, U.S.
- Genres: Hard rock, blues rock, rock
- Occupations: Bassist
- Years active: 1960s–2015

Craig MacGregor (September 13, 1949 – February 9, 2018) was an American musician. He was the longtime bassist for Foghat, a rock band he joined in 1976.

== Biography ==
MacGregor was born on September 13, 1949, in Iowa. He developed an interest in music at an early age, taking up piano at age seven before switching to trumpet and then drums. Following a three-year period as a drummer, MacGregor switched to bass guitar as his primary instrument as a result of his desire to be more out front while performing. As a teenager, he played with a variety of local Connecticut bands. One of these bands, Swan, had some moderate success and toured the United States. Two of his bandmates in Swan, Bobby T Torrello and Joe Kelly, went on to perform with Johnny Winter and Ike & Tina Turner.

MacGregor joined Foghat in 1976, replacing their interim bassist Nick Jameson. His debut recording with the band was 1976's Night Shift. He continued with the band until 1982, recording on many more albums including the multi-platinum Live (1977), Stone Blue (1978), and Boogie Motel (1979). He left the band in 1982 and rejoined them on and off through their reformation in the mid-1980s, up until the reformation of the band's original lineup in 1993. During this time, he also performed and recorded with other musicians and bands, including Randy and the Radiants, the Kneetremblers (which featured fellow Foghat members Roger Earl and Erik Cartwright), and Buck Dharma.

In 1991, MacGregor and his wife, Lisa, moved from Long Island, New York, to Fleetwood, Pennsylvania. They then moved to Wyomissing, Pennsylvania in the mid-1990s.

MacGregor rejoined Foghat in 2005, following the departure of original bassist Tony Stevens. In 2015, he was diagnosed with stage four lung cancer. It had first been detected in 2012, when it was much smaller, but the results of the tests were not disclosed to him. He became an advocate for the Patient Test Results Information Act, a bill that would require medical personnel to inform patients of all medical test results in a timely manner. Although he was still officially a member of Foghat, he did not perform live with them after August 2015, when he was replaced by Rodney O'Quinn.

MacGregor died of lung cancer at his home in Wyomissing, Pennsylvania, at the age of 68.

== Discography ==
=== Foghat ===
Year	Album	Type of album	Notes
1976	Night Shift	Studio album	
1977	Live	Live album	
1978	Stone Blue	Studio album	
1980	Tight Shoes	Studio album	
1981	Girls to Chat & Boys to Bounce	Studio album	
2003	Decades Live	Live album	5 tracks
2007	Live II	Live album	
2016	Under the Influence	Studio album	

=== Buck Dharma ===
Artist	Year	Album	Type of album	Notes
Buck Dharma	1982	Flat Out	Studio album	3 tracks
