= Sonic Mojo =

Studio album by Foghat
- Released: 10 November 2023
- Studio: Boogie Motel South, Deland, Florida, US
- Genre: Rock
- Length: 43:19
- Label: Foghat Records
- Producer: Bryan Bassett

Foghat chronology
8 Days on the Road (Live) (2021)	Sonic Mojo (2023)

“It’s in your DNA as an artist and a musician to continue being creative. That doesn’t just stop. And our fans are very tolerant of us with the [new material]. You carry on and you play. That’s what you do.”

—Roger Earl on recording Sonic Mojo

Sonic Mojo is the seventeenth studio album by British rock band Foghat, released on 10 November 2023. It comprises both cover songs and original compositions, including the last compositions by Kim Simmonds before his 2022 death, and is being promoted by a concert tour. The album marks their first release in seven years since 2016's Under the Influence.

== Reception ==
In American Songwriter, Lee Zimmerman gave Sonic Mojo 4 out of 5 stars, writing that it "lives up to its name, proving the fact that Foghat are as adept as ever". David Quantrick of Classic Rock gave this album 3.5 out of 5 stars, calling it "music that could have appeared any time between 1971 and now" and comparing the work to John Lee Hooker. Sonic Mojo is the first Foghat album to top a Billboard chart, debuting at number one on Top Blues Albums. As of March, 2024, the album remains in the Top 10 on that chart, logging its 16th consecutive week of chart activity. The song "Drivin' On" was the most played track on the Bluesville channel on SiriusXM in the month of February, 2024.

== Track listing ==
1. "She’s a Little Bit of Everything" (Bryan Bassett, Roger Earl, Scott Holt, Rodney O’Quinn, and Kim Simmonds) – 2:59
2. "I Don’t Appreciate You" (Bassett, R. Earl, Holt, and O’Quinn) – 2:56
3. "Mean Woman Blues" (Claude DeMetrius) – 3:33
4. "Drivin’ On" (Bassett, R. Earl, Holt, O’Quinn, and Simmonds) – 3:34
5. "Let Me Love You Baby" (Willie Dixon) – 3:36
6. "How Many More Years" (Chester Burnett) – 3:56
7. "Song for the Life" (Rodney J. Crowell) – 4:06
8. "Wish I’d Been There" (Bassett, C. Earl, R. Earl, Holt, and O’Quinn) – 4:05
9. "Time Slips Away" (Bassett, R. Earl, Holt, O’Quinn, and Simmonds) – 3:16
10. "Black Days and Blue Nights" (Bassett, R. Earl, Holt, and O’Quinn) – 4:41
11. "She’s Dynamite" (B.B. King) – 3:23
12. "Promised Land" (Chuck Berry) – 3:15

== Personnel ==
Foghat

- Bryan Bassett – lead guitar, slide guitar, vocals, engineering, mixing, production, mastering
- Roger Earl – drums, percussion, backing vocals
- Scott Holt – lead vocals, lead guitar
- Rodney O’Quinn – bass guitar, lead vocals

Additional personnel

- Linda Arcello-Earl – artwork, layout
- Eddie Lefebvre – percussion

== Charts ==
Chart (2023)	Peak position
US Top Blues Albums (Billboard)	1

== See also ==
- 2023 in British music
- List of 2023 albums
