= Tight Shoes =

Studio album by Foghat
- Released: 28 May 1980
- Recorded: 1979 at Foghat Studios, Port Jefferson, NY
- Genres: Pop rock, hard rock
- Length: 38:05
- Labels: Bearsville (Original release); Rhino (2006 CD reissue)
- Producers: Tony Outeda, Don Berman, Foghat

Foghat chronology
Boogie Motel (1979)	Tight Shoes (1980)	Girls to Chat and Boys to Bounce (1981)

Professional ratings
Review scores
Source	Rating
AllMusic	3/5 stars

Tight Shoes is the ninth studio album by the band Foghat. It was released in 1980 on Bearsville Records. It was also the last release Rod Price participated on until 1994's Return of the Boogie Men.

== Track listing ==
All tracks by Dave Peverett.

1. "Stranger in My Home Town" – 4:24
2. "Loose Ends" – 4:38
3. "Full Time Lover" – 4:30
4. "Baby Can I Change Your Mind" – 4:56
5. "Too Late the Hero" – 5:01
6. "Dead End Street" – 5:00
7. "Be My Woman" – 5:57
8. "No Hard Feelings" – 6:15

== Personnel ==
- Dave Peverett – rhythm guitar, vocals
- Rod Price – lead guitar, slide guitar
- Craig MacGregor – bass guitar
- Roger Earl – drums

== Charts ==
Chart (1980)	Peak position
Canada Top Albums/CDs (RPM)	76
US Billboard 200	106
