= Energized =

Studio album by Foghat
- Released: January 6, 1974
- Recorded: 1973
- Genres: Blues rock, hard rock
- Length: 39:30
- Label: Bearsville Records
- Producer: Tom Dawes

Foghat chronology
| Foghat (Rock and Roll) (1973) | Energized (1974) | Rock and Roll Outlaws (1974) |

Energized is the third album by rock band Foghat, released in January 1974. It peaked at #34 on the Billboard 200 and was certified as an RIAA Gold Record in the United States.

Professional ratings
Review scores
| Source | Rating |
|---|---|
| Allmusic | link |
| Christgau's Record Guide | B− |

== Track listing ==
1. "Honey Hush" – 4:19 (Big Joe Turner assigned to "Lou Willie Turner" [Joe's wife])
  - Interpolates music from "Train Kept A-Rollin'" by Tiny Bradshaw, Howard Kay, and Lois Mann.
2. "Step Outside" – 6:18 (Dave Peverett, Rod Price, Roger Earl, Tony Stevens)
3. "Golden Arrow" – 4:03 (Peverett, Price)
4. "Home in My Hand" – 5:09 (Peverett, Price)
5. "Wild Cherry" – 5:27 (Peverett, Price, Earl, Stevens, Tom Dawes)
6. "That'll Be the Day" – 2:33 (Jerry Allison, Buddy Holly, Norman Petty)
7. "Fly by Night" – 4:47 (Stevens)
8. "Nothin' I Won't Do" – 6:54 (Peverett, Price)

An edited version of "Step Outside" was released as a single, with a B-side of "Maybelline" from the band's first album, Foghat.

== Personnel ==
Foghat

- Dave Peverett – guitar, vocals
- Rod Price – guitar, slide guitar, dobro, vocals
- Tony Stevens – bass, vocals
- Roger Earl – drums, percussion

Production

- Tom Dawes – production
- Tony Outeda – coordination
- Pacific Eye and Ear – album design

== Charts ==
| Chart (1974) | Peak position |
|---|---|
| Canada Top Albums/CDs (RPM) | 38 |
| US Billboard 200 | 34 |

== Certifications ==
| Region | Certification | Certified units/sales |
|---|---|---|
| United States (RIAA) | Gold | 500,000^{^} |
^{^} Shipments figures based on certification alone.
