= Last Train Home (album) =

Studio album by Foghat
- Released: 15 June 2010
- Genre: Hard rock, blues rock
- Length: 60:15
- Label: Foghat Records
- Producer: Foghat

Foghat chronology
Family Joules (2003)	Last Train Home (2010)	Under the Influence (2016)

Professional ratings
Review scores
Source	Rating
Allmusic	3/5 stars

Last Train Home is the fifteenth studio album by British hard rock band Foghat. The album was released on 15 June 2010, under the band's independent music label Foghat Records.

== Critical reception ==
Since its release, Last Train Home has been met with mostly positive reviews from critics. Steven Erlewine of Allmusic gave the album three stars out of a possible five, and said that Foghat "play with a considerable amount of energy and a precision that only a veteran touring band could have, making this a nice little surprise for hardcore fans".

== Track listing ==
1. "Born for the Road" (Bryan Bassett) – 4:59
2. "Needle & Spoon" (Chris Youlden) – 3:46
3. "So Many Roads, So Many Trains" (Otis Rush) – 4:50
4. "Last Train Home" (Bassett) – 4:22
5. "Shake Your Money Maker" (Elmore James) – 4:38
6. "It Hurts Me Too" (Elmore James) – 5:59
7. "Feel So Bad" (Chuck Willis) – 4:39
8. "Louisiana Blues" (Muddy Waters) – 4:43
9. "495 Boogie" (Bassett / Lefty "Sugar Lips" Lefkowitz) – 3:55
10. "Rollin' & Tumblin' / You Need Love" (Willie Dixon) – 8:12
11. "In My Dreams" (Eddie Kirkland) – 5:42
12. "Good Good Day" (Eddie Kirkland) – 4:30

== Personnel ==
- Bryan Bassett – guitar, slide guitar, vocals
- Colin Earl – keyboards
- Roger Earl – drums, vocals
- Jeff Howell – bass guitar, vocals
- Charlie Huhn – guitar, vocals
- Eddie Kirkland – guitar, vocals
- Lefty "Sugar Lips" Lefkowitz – harmonica
