= Boogie Motel =

Studio album by Foghat
- Released: 21 September 1979
- Recorded: 1979
- Studio: Boogie Motel, Port Jefferson, NY
- Genre: Rock, blues rock
- Length: 36:35
- Label: Bearsville
- Producer: Foghat, Tony Outeda

Foghat chronology
| Stone Blue (1978) | Boogie Motel (1979) | Tight Shoes (1980) |

Professional ratings
Review scores
| Source | Rating |
|---|---|
| AllMusic | 1.5/5 stars |
| The Encyclopedia of Popular Music | 3/5 stars |
| MusicHound Rock: The Essential Album Guide | 1.5/5 stars |

Boogie Motel is the eighth studio album by rock band Foghat, released in 1979. It was recorded at the Boogie Hotel Studios in Port Jefferson, NY, and was certified gold in the US. The cover art is by Jim Baikie.

"Third Time Lucky (First Time I Was a Fool)" was included on The Best of Foghat (1985). "Somebody's Been Sleepin' in My Bed" was included on The Best of Foghat – Volume II (1992).

== Track listing ==
All tracks by Dave Peverett, except where noted.

1. "Somebody's Been Sleepin' in My Bed" (General Johnson, Greg Perry, Angelo Bond) – 3:50
2. "Third Time Lucky (First Time I Was a Fool)" – 4:12
3. "Comin' Down with Love" – 5:23
4. "Paradise Alley" – 5:37
5. "Boogie Motel" (Rod Price, Peverett) – 7:20
6. "Love in Motion" – 4:30
7. "Nervous Release" – 5:53

== Personnel ==
- Lonesome Dave Peverett – electric and acoustic guitar, lead vocals
- Rod Price – dobro, lead guitar, slide guitar, vocals
- Craig MacGregor – bass guitar
- Roger Earl – drums
- Colin Earl – keyboards
- Jimmy Ambrosio – accordion
- Alto Reed – saxophone

Additional personnel

- Jim Baikie – cover art
- David Berman – engineer
- Tony Berman – engineer
- Bob Coffee – assistant engineer
- Bob Ludwig – mastering
- Tony Outeda – producer, management

== Charts ==
| Chart (1979) | Peak position |
|---|---|
| US Billboard 200 | 35 |
