= Family Jewels =

Family Jewels or The Family Jewels may refer to:

== Music ==
- Family Jewels (video compilation), a two-disc compilation DVD by the hard rock band AC/DC, featuring the group's music videos, live clips and promotional videos from 1975 to 1991
- The Family Jewels (album), 2010 album by Marina and the Diamonds
  - "The Family Jewels", a bonus track from the album

== Film, TV, and literature ==
- The Family Jewels (film), 1965 film starring Jerry Lewis
- Gene Simmons Family Jewels, an American reality TV series
- Bijuterii de familie, translated to English as Family Jewels, a novel by Petru Dumitriu

== Other ==
- Family Jewels (Central Intelligence Agency), a set of reports on the CIA's illegal activities
- A human man's testicles (as a slang term)

== See also ==
- Family Joules, a 2003 album by Foghat
- Jewellery, a form of personal adornment, such as brooches, rings, necklaces, earrings, and bracelets
- Heirloom, something, perhaps an antique or some kind of jewelry, that has been passed down for generations through family members
