= Tony Outeda =

- Born: March 29, 1945; Long Island, New York
- Occupation(s): Artist Manager and Record Company President
- Labels: Warner Bros. Records; Bearsville; PBS Records

Tony Outeda (March 29, 1945) is an American music manager and record executive, best known for managing Foghat and creating and running PBS Records.

== Career ==
Tony's music business career began in 1967 when he was hired by Brian Epstein, manager of the Beatles, to be his assistant in the United States. Epstein had just formed a partnership with Robert Stigwood, and also worked with Cream, the Bee Gees and the Cyrkle.

After Epstein's death, Tony joined the Willard Alexander Agency, known for booking big band and jazz acts including Benny Goodman and Count Basie, as an agent and to develop a rock and roll department there and brought to the agency, artists including, Kenny Rankin and Carly Simon's band, The Elephants’ Memory.

When Roger Earl, drummer, and "Lonesome" Dave Peverett, lead singer, left Savoy Brown, Tony travelled to England and became the founding manager of their new band, Foghat which included Rod Price, guitar. Tony invited Albert Grossman, co-owner of Bearsville Records, to England to hear Foghat audition. Bearsville Records was a joint venture/partnership label with Warner Bros. Records, headed by Mo Ostin. Albert also managed Bob Dylan, Peter, Paul and Mary, The Band, Janis Joplin and Richie Havens and he signed Foghat as the first English band on his new label. Their first record, Foghat (1973 album), was recorded in Rockfield Studios in South Wales and produced by Dave Edmunds. Foghat went on to headline arenas and record gold, platinum and multiplatinum albums, including their most successful, Fool for the City and Foghat Live. Two of their most successful chart singles were Slow Ride, produced by Nick Jameson, and Third Time Lucky, produced by Tony and Foghat.

Tony also managed Felix Cavaliere, former lead singer of The Rascals.

In 1998, Tony created PBS Records, a partnership label and joint venture between Warner Bros. Records, led by Russ Thyret, and PBS Television. While President of PBS Records, the label produced TV specials with companion records with artists including Monica Mancini, as well as soundtracks to documentaries with Ken Burns, Louis Gates Jr., and Jennifer Fox (documentary filmmaker).

=== Personal life ===
Tony lives with his wife, Heather Creran, in Georgia and has a daughter, Amy.
