= Family Joules =

Studio album by Foghat
- Released: 2003
- Genre: Rock, hard rock, blues rock
- Length: 57:25
- Label: Varese Vintage
- Producer: Foghat

Foghat chronology
| Return of the Boogie Men (1994) | Family Joules (2003) | Decades Live (2003) |

Family Joules is the fourteenth studio album by Foghat, released in 2003. It is the first album by the band without its founding member, guitarist and singer Dave Peverett and their first album to feature singer/guitarist Charlie Huhn and guitarist Bryan Bassett.

== Track listing ==
All tracks written by Bryan Bassett, Roger Earl, Charlie Huhn and Tony Stevens, except where noted.

1. "Mumbo Jumbo" - 4:19
2. "Hero to Zero" (Duke Ellington, Bassett, Earl, Huhn, Stevens) - 4:48
3. "Thames Delta Blues" - 5:38
4. "Flat Busted (And Out of Gas)" (Huhn) - 4:08
5. "I Feel Fine" (Bassett) - 3:11
6. "I'm a Rock 'N Roller" - 5:35
7. "Hit the Ground Running" - 4:05
8. "Looking for You" - 4:42
9. "Long Time Coming" - 3:37
10. "Sex with the Ex" - 4:16
11. "Self-Medicated" - 7:31
12. "Mean Voodoo Woman" - 4:12
13. "Voodoo Woman Blues" - 1:23

Live bonus tracks on 2010 reissue

14. "I Feel Fine" (Bassett)
15. "Mumbo Jumbo"
16. "Sweet Home Chicago" (Robert Johnson)

== Personnel ==
=== Foghat ===
- Charlie Huhn - lead vocals, guitar
- Bryan Bassett - guitar, vocals
- Tony Stevens - bass, vocals
- Roger Earl - drums

=== Production ===
- Foghat - producer
- Carl Davino - assistant engineer
- Linda Arcello - design, layout Design, photography
- Bob Katz - mastering
- Billy Kemp - photography
