= Return of the Boogie Men =

Studio album by Foghat
- Released: 1994
- Recorded: 1994
- Studio: At Stagg Street Studio, Los Angeles, CA., Studio MastersStudios, Los Angeles
- Genre: Rock
- Label: Modern Records, (U.S)
- Producer: Nick Jameson, Tom Dawes (треков: 7 to 10)

Foghat chronology
Zig-Zag Walk (1983)	Return of the Boogie Men (1994)	Family Joules (2003)

Professional ratings
Review scores
Source	Rating
AllMusic	link

Return of the Boogie Men is the thirteenth studio album by British hard rock band Foghat, released in 1994. This album reunited the original members of the band, Dave Peverett, Roger Earl, Rod Price and Tony Stevens. Price had left the group after the completion of 1980's "Tight Shoes" release; Stevens had departed following the recording of "Rock and Roll Outlaws" in 1974. Beginning in June, 1994, Foghat toured through the end of 1996 to promote "Return of the Boogie Men". Two performances at the Roseland Theater in Portland, Oregon on October 25 and 26, 1996 were recorded which resulted in the 1998 live album, Road Cases.

== Background and release ==
After separating, Dave Peverett, Rod Price, Tony Stevens, and Roger Earl released their album Return of the Boogie Men in 1994.

== Reception ==
AllMusic described the album containing "excellent-to-average originals". The website cited influences such as Muddy Waters and Elmore James. AllMusic praised some of the songs, stating that they contain "rip-snorting hard rock" and acoustic harmonica, concluding the review.

== Track listing ==
1. "Jump That Train" (Dave Peverett) - 5:16
2. "Louisiana Blues" (McKinley Morganfield) - 5:47
3. "Motel Shaker" (Nick Jameson, Peverett, Rod Price) - 4:39
4. "Play Dirty" (Peverett) - 5:02
5. "Nothin' but Trouble" (Peverett, Price) - 4:49
6. "Talk to Me Baby" (Robert Emmett Dolan, Elmore James) - 3:57
7. "I Just Want to Make Love to You" (Willie Dixon) - 4:17
8. "Take Me to the River" (Al Green, Mabon "Teenie" Hodges) - 5:14
9. "That's Alright Mama" (Arthur Crudup) - 4:17
10. "Feel So Good" (Big Bill Broonzy) - 3:03
11. "I Want You to Love Me" (Dixon, Muddy Waters) - 5:34
12. "Writing on the Wall" (Peverett, Price) - 4:28

== Personnel ==
- Lonesome Dave Peverett – Vocals, rhythm guitar
- Rod Price – Lead guitar, slide guitar, vocals
- Tony Stevens – Bass guitar, vocals
- Roger Earl – Drums, percussion
