= Stone Blue =

Studio album by Foghat
- Released: May 1978
- Genres: Rock, blues rock, hard rock
- Length: 38:42
- Labels: Bearsville (Original release); Rhino (Reissue)

Foghat chronology
Live (1977)	Stone Blue (1978)	Boogie Motel (1979)

Professional ratings
Review scores
Source	Rating
AllMusic	2/5 stars
MusicHound Rock: The Essential Album Guide	2.5/5 stars
The Rolling Stone Album Guide	2/5 stars

Stone Blue is the seventh studio album by the English rock band Foghat. It was released in May 1978 on Bearsville Records. Stone Blue paired Foghat with producer Eddie Kramer, who had previously engineered recordings for Jimi Hendrix and Led Zeppelin. Kramer and Foghat did not collaborate smoothly, but the tension in the studio may have helped to give the album an added edge. The album contains a ferocious cover of Robert Johnson's "Sweet Home Chicago".

== Track listing ==
No.	Title	Writer(s)	Length
1.	"Stone Blue"	Dave Peverett	5:35
2.	"Sweet Home Chicago"	Robert Johnson	3:56
3.	"Easy Money"	Peverett	3:54
4.	"Midnight Madness"	Peverett, Rod Price	6:50
5.	"It Hurts Me Too"	Unknown, additional lyrics by Elmore James (or Mel London)	5:28
6.	"High on Love"	Peverett, Price	5:17
7.	"Chevrolet"	Earl McDaniel	3:18
8.	"Stay with Me"	Peverett, Price	4:22

== Personnel ==
- Dave Peverett – rhythm guitar, vocals
- Rod Price – lead guitar, slide guitar
- Craig MacGregor – bass guitar
- Roger Earl – drums

== Charts ==
Chart (1978)	Peak position
Australian Albums (Kent Music Report)	82
Canada Top Albums/CDs (RPM)	21
US Billboard 200	25

== Certifications ==
Region	Certification	Certified units/sales
United States (RIAA)	Gold	500,000^{^}
^{^} Shipments figures based on certification alone.
