= In the Mood for Something Rude =

Studio album by Foghat
- Released: 18 October 1982
- Recorded: 1982
- Genre: Rock, blues rock, boogie rock
- Length: 33:33
- Label: Bearsville (original release); Rhino (2006 CD reissue)
- Producer: Nick Jameson, Tony Outeda

Foghat chronology
Girls to Chat & Boys to Bounce (1981)	In the Mood for Something Rude (1982)	Zig-Zag Walk (1983)

In the Mood for Something Rude is the eleventh studio album by British hard rock band Foghat, released in 1982. All eight tracks on the album were penned by outside writers, and the record is something of a covers album in which the band applies its bluesy rock and roll style over a collection of R&B and country tunes.

Professional ratings
Review scores
Source	Rating
AllMusic	3/5 stars

== Track listing ==
1. "Slipped, Tripped, Fell in Love" (George Jackson) - 4:18
2. "Bustin' Up or Bustin' Out" (James Edward Fuller, Leroy Hodges, Jr., Marshall Jones) - 3:43
3. "Take This Heart of Mine" (Pete Moore, Smokey Robinson, Marv Tarplin) - 3:08
4. "Love Rustler" (Dennis Linde, Thomas Cain) - 5:48
5. "Ain't Livin' Long Like This" (Rodney Crowell) - 4:55
6. "Back for a Taste of Your Love" (Syl Johnson, Darryl Carter, Brenda L. Thompson) - 4:35
7. "There Ain't No Man That Can't Be Caught" (Jimmy Lewis) - 3:44
8. "And I Do Just What I Want" (James Brown) - 3:22

== Personnel ==
=== Foghat ===
- Dave Peverett: Vocals, rhythm guitar
- Erik Cartwright: Vocals, rhythm and lead guitar
- Nick Jameson: Bass, keyboards, percussion
- Roger Earl: Drums, percussion

=== Additional personnel ===
- Rich Oppenheim: Saxophone
- Barbara Nolan, Maris Hall: Additional vocals (listed as "mating sounds")

== Production ==
- Arranged by Foghat
- Produced by Nick Jameson and Tony Outeda
- Recorded and mixed by Nick Jameson
- Mastered by Bob Ludwig

=== Additional credits ===
Photography By – Chris Callis

== Charts ==
Chart (1982)	Peak position
US Billboard 200	162
