= Foghat Live =

Live

Live album by Foghat
- Released: 19 August 1977
- Recorded: 10 May 1977
- Venues: Dome Arena, Henrietta, New York
- Genres: Rock, blues rock, hard rock
- Length: 38:31
- Label: Bearsville
- Producer: Nick Jameson

Foghat chronology
Night Shift (1976)	Live (1977)	Stone Blue (1978)

Foghat Live is a 1977 live album by Foghat. The release is Foghat's bestselling album with over two million copies sold, and certified double platinum in the United States.

In 2007, to celebrate the 30th anniversary of the album, Foghat released the Live II double album.

Professional ratings
Review scores
Source	Rating
AllMusic	link
Select	2/5 medals

== Track listing ==
=== Side one ===
1. "Fool for the City" (Dave Peverett) - 5:31
2. "Home in My Hand" (Dave Peverett, Rod Price) - 4:56
3. "I Just Want to Make Love to You" (Willie Dixon) - 8:36

=== Side two ===
1. "Road Fever" (Peverett, Price) - 5:29
2. "Honey Hush" (Big Joe Turner) - 5:38
3. "Slow Ride" (Peverett) - 8:21

== Personnel ==
Adapted from album liner notes

Foghat

- Lonesome Dave Peverett – Rhythm Guitar and Lead Vocals.
- Rod Price – Lead Guitar and Backing Vocals.
- Craig MacGregor – Bass and Backing Vocals.
- Roger Earl – Drums.

Other Musicians

- Dan Craig – Percussion.
- Dave Lang – Percussion.
- Nick Jameson – Percussion.

Recording Unit

- Nick Jameson – Engineer and Producer.
- Bill Inglot – Remastering.
- Ken Perry – Remastering.
- Alen MacWeeney – Photography.
- Tony Outeda – Coordination.

== Charts ==
Chart (1977)	Peak position
Canada Top Albums/CDs (RPM)	5
US Billboard 200	11

== Certifications ==
Region	Certification	Certified units/sales
United States (RIAA)	2× Platinum	2,000,000^{^}
^{^} Shipments figures based on certification alone.
