= Night Shift (album) =

Studio album by Foghat
- Released: November 1976
- Recorded: 1975
- Genres: Rock, hard rock, rock and roll
- Length: 40:32
- Label: Bearsville
- Producer: Dan Hartman

Foghat chronology
Fool for the City (1975)	Night Shift (1976)	Live (1977)

Professional ratings
Review scores
Source	Rating
AllMusic	2.5/5 stars
The Encyclopedia of Popular Music	4/5 stars
MusicHound Rock: The Essential Album Guide	3/5 stars
The Rolling Stone Album Guide	2/5 stars

Night Shift is the sixth studio album by British rock band Foghat. It was released in 1976 by Bearsville Records.

The album peaked at No. 36 on the Billboard 200. It has sold more than 500,000 copies.

== Production ==
Night Shift was the first Foghat album to include bassist Craig MacGregor, who had toured with the band in support of Fool for the City. The album was produced by Dan Hartman.

== Critical reception ==
MusicHound Rock: The Essential Album Guide called the album "a consistent serving of meat-and-potatoes hard rock." Record Collector wrote that "the title track is Foghat boogie at its very best, while their version of 'Take Me To The River' is one of the best you'll ever hear."

== Track listing ==
1. "Drivin' Wheel" (Dave Peverett, Rod Price) - 5:11/4:30
2. "Don't Run Me Down" (Peverett) - 6:32
3. "Burnin' the Midnight Oil" (Peverett) - 5:38
4. "Night Shift" (Peverett, Price) - 5:32
5. "Hot Shot Love" (Peverett) - 4:00
6. "Take Me to the River" (Al Green, Mabon "Teenie" Hodges) - 4:40/3:22
7. "I'll Be Standing By" (Peverett, Price) - 5:53/3:46
8. "New Place to Call Home" (Peverett, Price) - 2:58 (Bonus track on 2006 remaster; listed on album cover but not the label)

== Personnel ==
- Lonesome Dave Peverett - lead vocals, guitar, heavy breathing
- Rod "The Bottle" Price - guitar, slide guitar, steel guitar, vocals
- Roger Earl - drums, percussion
- Craig MacGregor - bass guitar, backing vocals

== Charts ==
Chart (1976)	Peak position
Canada Top Albums/CDs (RPM)	77
US Billboard 200	36

== Certifications ==
Region	Certification	Certified units/sales
United States (RIAA)	Gold	500,000^{^}
^{^} Shipments figures based on certification alone.
