= Charlie Huhn =

American rock musician

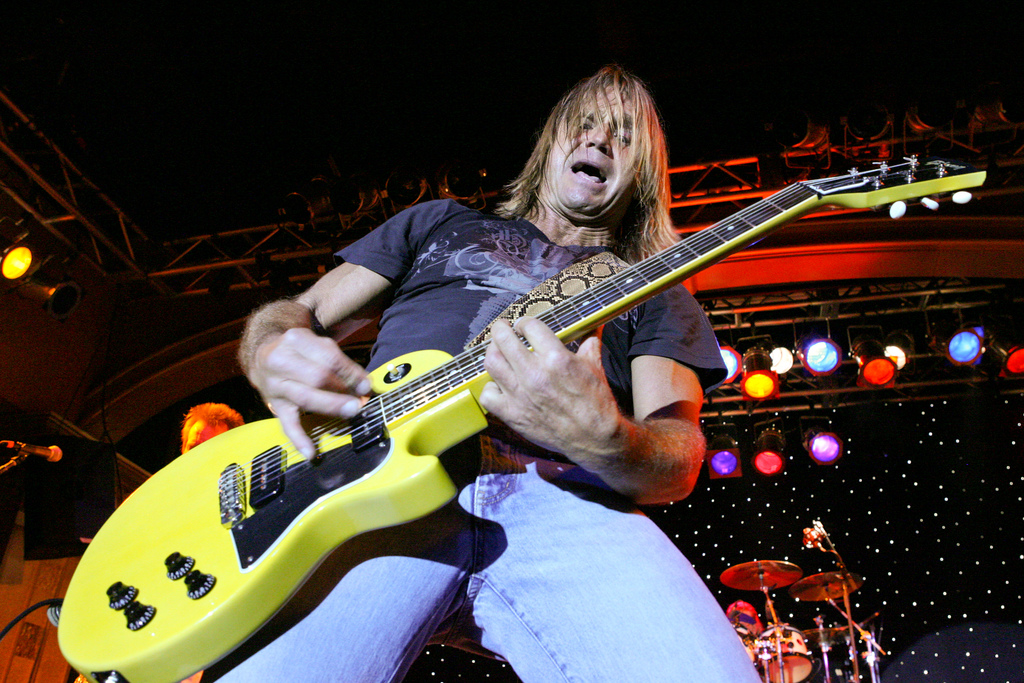
- Huhn performing with Foghat in 2007

Background information
- Born: Charles Huhn; January 11, 1951 (age 75); Portland, Oregon, U.S.
- Genres: Hard rock; blues rock; heavy metal
- Occupation: Musician
- Instruments: Vocals; guitar
- Years active: 1967–2022
- Formerly of: Ted Nugent; Gary Moore; Victory; Humble Pie; Axel Rudi Pell; Deadringer; Matt Roehr; Foghat

Charles Hartley Huhn (born January 11, 1951) is an American rock singer, songwriter, guitarist and keyboard player. He got his start in Grand Rapids, Michigan, playing with local groups Cirrus, Tanglewood, and Vic Amato & Co before joining Ted Nugent in January, 1978. After recording one Platinum and three Gold Records with Nugent, in addition to completing three world headliner tours, he joined Gary Moore's band, touring the U.K with Moore throughout 1981-82 and recording on the LPs Dirty Fingers and Do You Want Some Moore. In 1983, he joined Victory, recording four albums and performing four European and American tours with the group. In 1988, he joined Humble Pie and recorded the CD Live At The Agora, performing live with the band until 2000, at which point he joined Foghat after the untimely death of that band's frontman, Dave Peverett. He recorded and performed steadily with Foghat until retiring in 2022.

== Early life ==
Born in 1951 in Portland, Oregon, Huhn moved to Grand Rapids, Michigan at the age of four when he began his music career. He started with piano and voice lessons, and soon after taught himself the guitar. He began performing in rock bands in 1967, initially with Cirrus, composed of high school friends; in 1973, he performed in Tanglewood, a full-time successful mid-west bar band.

== Career ==
=== Ted Nugent ===
In 1975, after graduating from Michigan State with a Bachelor's degree in Social Sciences, Huhn played with longtime friend and drummer Vic Amato for two and a half years, before auditioning for Ted Nugent. He came to prominence when he joined Nugent's band in 1978, replacing band member Derek St. Holmes, and being thrust immediately into the spotlight. At the time Huhn joined Nugent, the latter was one of the hottest acts in the world.

Huhn handled lead vocals on the classic Nugent anthem "Weekend Warriors", and was also featured prominently on the album of the same name, which sold more than a million copies, going platinum within a week of release. Huhn remained with Ted Nugent's band until 1982, recording three studio albums and one live album during his tenure. Another live recording, from a 1979 show at London's Hammersmith Odeon, was later released in 1998.

After leaving Ted Nugent, Huhn worked briefly with Irish guitar legend Gary Moore on his album Dirty Fingers, touring with Moore for some gigs in August 1982. He would leave to pursue an offer from Geffen Records to write songs with future Yes guitarist Trevor Rabin and to put a band together with bassist Mark Andes and drummer Frankie Banali. The group recorded demos but nothing came of it.

He next served as frontman for the band Victory, a group based in Hannover, Germany. He recorded four releases as Victory's original lead vocalist, guitarist and songwriter, and the band had minor success with their 1986 single "The Check's in the Mail". He left the group in early 1988 to play with Jerry Shirley and Humble Pie. He would also team up with former Alice Cooper band rhythm section Neal Smith and Dennis Dunaway and Blue Öyster Cult's Joe Bouchard in a project called Deadringer, resulting in the release of the album Electrocution of the Heart in 1989.

=== Humble Pie ===
In 1988, former Humble Pie and Fastway drummer Jerry Shirley organized a new version of Humble Pie in which he would be the group's leader and only original member. He hired Huhn as the group's lead singer, which worked quite well as the band's original vocalist Steve Marriott and Huhn had very similar vocal styles. Humble Pie Featuring Jerry Shirley was based in Cleveland, Ohio, where Shirley worked as a DJ at a classic rock radio station. Huhn and Shirley were the mainstays in the band, and together with numerous rotating musicians performed Humble Pie music regularly all over the United States for the next ten years. No official recordings with Huhn as the band's singer were ever released, although the group was broadcast live on special radio concerts on several occasions, and bootlegs of those performances do exist. During the latter part of the 1990s, Jerry Shirley developed a string of legal problems and moved back to his native England, taking the Humble Pie name with him. Huhn ended his longtime stint with Shirley in 1999.

Between 1993 and 1995, concurrent with his time in Humble Pie, Huhn fronted Michigan band No Mercy with Brownsville Station's Michael Lutz on bass, Ted Nugent, Blackfoot drummer Gunner Ross, and Scotty Anderson on lead guitar. Huhn and Ross had also played together in the Detroit band The Almighty Strut in the early '80's.

=== Foghat ===
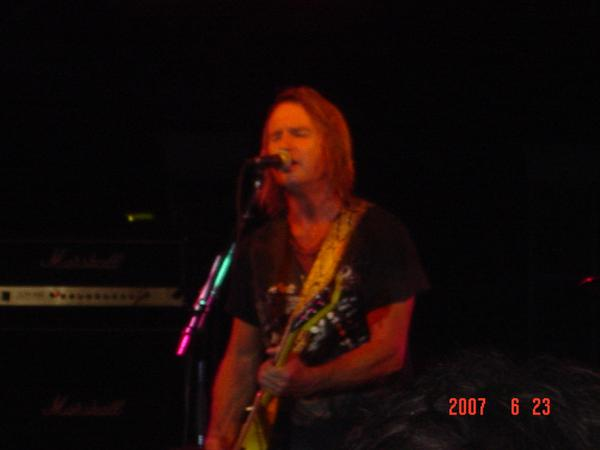
Huhn singing for Foghat at the 2007 Heritage Fest in Downers Grove, Illinois

In 2000, Huhn joined another classic rock act, Foghat, as lead vocalist. Original Foghat vocalist Dave Peverett died of cancer in 2000, and the band's remaining members wanted to continue performing. Huhn accepted the band's offer to join, playing guitar in addition to his lead vocal duties. Although Bryan Bassett (formerly of Wild Cherry and Molly Hatchet) handled most of the lead guitar work, Huhn provided steady rhythms and played some solos as well. Huhn recorded three studio releases with Foghat: Family Joules (2002), Last Train Home (2010), and Under the Influence (2016); and three live releases: Foghat Live II (2007), a double-disc collection featuring the band's greatest hits; Live at the Blues Warehouse, originally a live session for DJ Mark Klein's weekly ‘Long Island Blues Warehouse Radio Show’; and a live show from the Under the Influence Tour, Live at the Bottoms Up. Huhn can also be seen on two DVD releases: 2005's Official Bootleg DVD - Vol. 1 (2002 - 2004); and Live in St. Pete, issued in December 2013.

In 2003, he took part in a reunion with his former Victory bandmates. The result was the CD release Instinct. Huhn declined an offer to rejoin Victory as the band's permanent lead vocalist, and chose instead to continue his work with Foghat. In 2007, he recorded an album with guitarist Matt Roehr, formerly of German superstars Böhse Onkelz.

He remained a vital part of Foghat until January 21, 2022.

== Discography ==
with Foghat

- Family Joules (2002)
- Official Bootleg DVD - Vol. 1 (2002-2004) (2005)
- Foghat Live II (2007)
- Live at the Blues Warehouse (2009)
- Last Train Home (2010)
- Live in St. Pete DVD (2013)
- Under the Influence (2016)
- 8 Days on the Road (2021)

with Matt Roehr

- Barra da Tijuca (2007)

with Deadringer

- Electrocution of the Heart (1989)

with Axel Rudi Pell

- Wild Obsession (1989)

with Victory

- Victory (1985)
- Don't Get Mad... Get Even (1986)
- Hungry Hearts (1987)
- That's Live (1988)
- Instinct (2003)

with Gary Moore

- Dirty Fingers (1983)

with Ted Nugent

- Weekend Warriors (1978)
- State of Shock (1979)
- Scream Dream (1980)
- Intensities in 10 Cities (1981)
