= Under the Influence (Foghat album) =

Studio album by Foghat
- Released: 24 June 2016
- Genres: Southern rock, blues rock
- Length: 53:25
- Producer: Tom Hambridge

Foghat chronology
Last Train Home (2010)	Under the Influence (2016)	Live at the Belly Up (2017)

Professional ratings
Review scores
Source	Rating

Under the Influence is the sixteenth studio album by British hard rock band Foghat. Kim Simmonds, the guitarist of Savoy Brown, which Earl and two other members left to form Foghat, makes an appearance. Also, Nick Jameson, who played bass on "Slow Ride," sat in on a new version of their biggest hit which celebrates the 40th anniversary of the song. The band launched a Pledgemusic campaign on 10 November 2015. The album is completely fan-funded.

== Track listing ==
No.	Title	Writer(s)	Length
1.	"Under the Influence"	Hambridge, Bassett, Earl, Huhn, Simmonds	4:29
2.	"Knock It Off"	Hambridge, Bassett, Earl, Huhn	4:14
3.	"Ghost"	Huhn, Hambridge, Earl, Bassett	3:19
4.	"She's Got a Ring in His Nose" (Savoy Brown cover)	Christopher Youlden	3:57
5.	"Upside of Lonely" (Tom Hambridge cover)	Hambridge, Nicholson, Thackery	4:30
6.	"Heard It Through the Grapevine" (Gladys Knight & the Pips / Marvin Gaye cover)	Norman Whitfield, Barret Strong	4:21
7.	"Made Up My Mind" (Savoy Brown cover)	Youlden	3:13
8.	"Hot Mama"	Hambridge, Fleming	3:34
9.	"Heart Gone Cold"	Huhn, Hambridge, Earl, Bassett	4:26
10.	"Honey Do List"	Holt, Earl, Bassett	4:44
11.	"All Because of You"	Holt, Earl, Bassett	4:56
12.	"Slow Ride"	Dave Peverett	7:43

== Personnel ==
- Bryan Bassett – lead, slide guitar, background vocals (tracks 1–6, 8–12)
- Roger Earl – drums, background vocals (all tracks)
- Charlie Huhn – lead vocals, rhythm guitar (tracks 1–4, 6–9, 12)
- Craig MacGregor – bass guitar (tracks 2, 4–7, 10–12)
- Nick Jameson – bass guitar (tracks 1, 8, 12)
- Rodney O'Quinn – bass guitar, background vocals (tracks 3, 9)
- Kim Simmonds – guitar (tracks 1, 5, 7)
- Scott Holt – guitar, vocals (tracks 1, 4–5, 7–8, 10–11)
- Dana Fuchs – vocals (tracks 6, 10)
- Tom Hambridge – percussion (tracks 6, 9)

== Charts ==
Chart (2016)	Peak position
US Top Hard Rock Albums (Billboard)	17
US Independent Albums (Billboard)	40
