= Zig-Zag Walk =

Studio album by Foghat
- Released: 11 May 1983
- Genre: Rock
- Length: 36:04
- Label: Bearsville (Original release); Rhino (2006 CD reissue)
- Producer: Nick Jameson (as Franz Leipkin)

Foghat chronology
In the Mood for Something Rude (1982)	Zig-Zag Walk (1983)	Return of the Boogie Men (1994)

Professional ratings
Review scores
Source	Rating
AllMusic	2.5/5 stars

Zig-Zag Walk is the twelfth studio album by British hard rock band Foghat, released in 1983. Unlike the previous year's In the Mood for Something Rude, which consisted of all outside material, lead singer Dave Peverett wrote five of the album's ten songs, with guitarist Erik Cartwright contributing a sixth. A few of the songs are given a rockabilly treatment augmenting the blues rock the band is better known for. It would be the band's last album for over a decade until their comeback album, Return of the Boogie Men, in 1994.

Producer "Franz Leipkin" and keyboardist "Eli Jenkins" are pseudonyms for old bandmate Nick Jameson, who had played in Foghat in 1975 and produced or co-produced various Foghat albums in the 1970s and 1980s. Paul Butterfield makes a guest appearance on one song, playing harmonica on "Seven Day Weekend".

== Track listing ==
1. "That's What Love Can Do" (Dave Peverett) – 3:54
2. "Zig-Zag Walk" (Peverett) – 3:28
3. "Choo Choo Ch'Boogie" (Denver Darling, Milt Gabler, Vaughn Horton) – 2:43
4. "Jenny Don't Mind" (Erik Cartwright) – 4:37
5. "Three Wheel Cadillac" (Peverett) – 3:55
6. "It'll Be Me" (Jack Clement) – 3:29
7. "Silent Treatment" (Peverett) – 3:17
8. "Down the Road a Piece" (Don Raye) – 2:35
9. "Seven Day Weekend" (Peverett) – 4:10
10. "Linda Lou" (Jon Jelmer) – 3:46

== Personnel ==
- Dave Peverett — lead and backing vocals, rhythm guitar
- Erik Cartwright — lead guitar, slide guitar
- Eli Jenkins — bass, backing vocals, keyboards
- Roger Earl — drums

== Charts ==
Chart (1983)	Peak position
US Billboard 200	192
