= Victory (band) =

German hard rock/heavy metal band

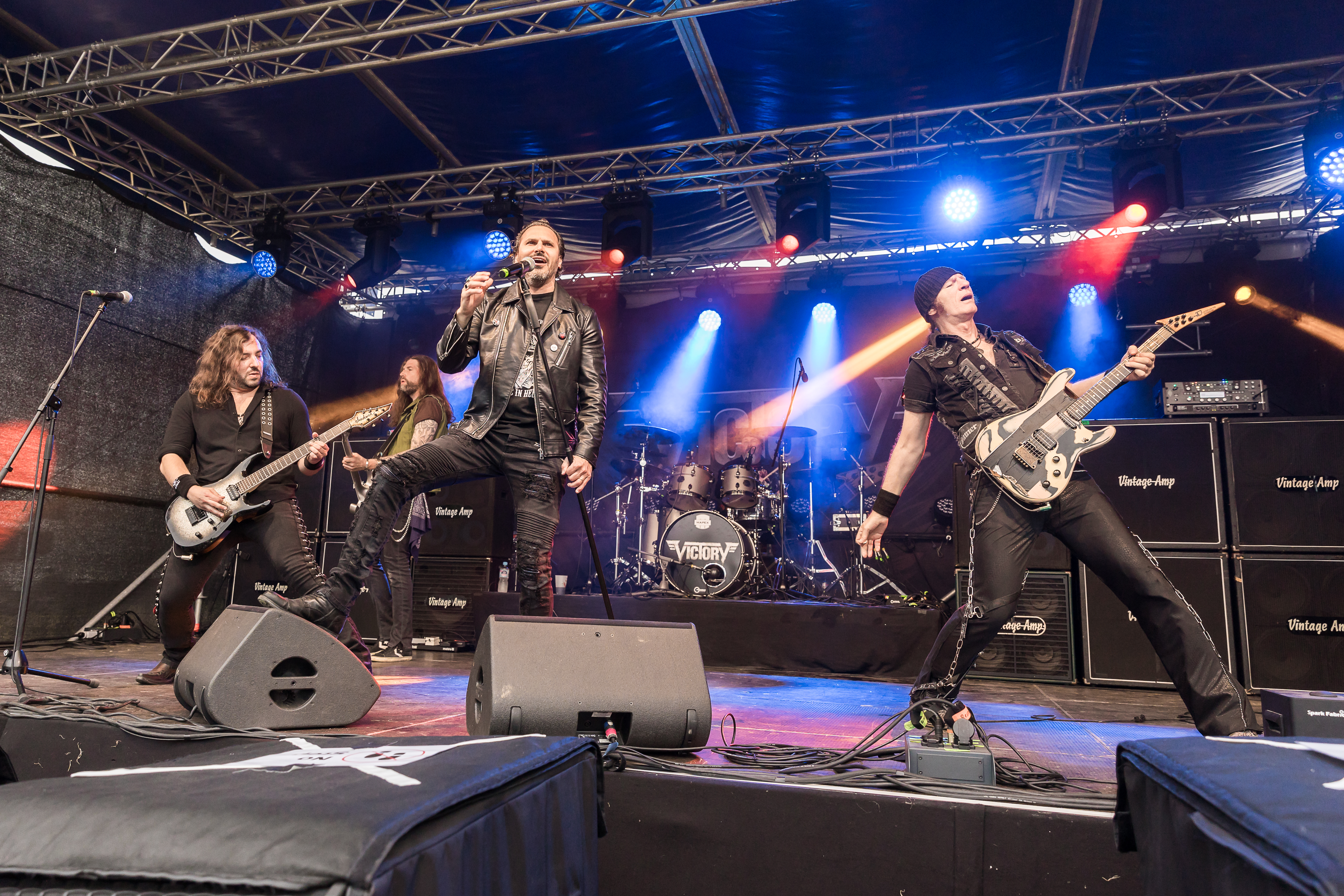

Background information
- Origin: Hanover, Germany
- Genres: Hard rock, heavy metal
- Years active: 1984–present
- Members: Jioti Parcharidis; Herman Frank; Christos Mamalitsidis; Peter Pichl; Michael Wolpers
- Past members: Pedro Schemm; Charlie Huhn; Fernando Garcia; Tommy Newton; John Lockton; Jake Paland; Bernie Van Der Graaf; Matthias Liebetruth; Fritz Randow; Achim Keller; Peter Knorn
- Website: victory-band.com

Victory is a German heavy metal and hard rock band from Hanover, most successful in the 1980s. With extensive tours and radio airplay, the band also made a breakthrough in North America.

== History ==
=== Emergence ===
Victory was formed in 1984 from the remnants of the band Fargo. Bassist Peter Knorn, the two guitarists Tommy Newton and John Lockton and drummer Bernie Van Der Graaf had all previously worked together in that band. After originally working with singer Pedro Schemm, former Gary Moore and Ted Nugent singer Charlie Huhn became the band's singer. Recommended by Scorpions' guitarist Rudolf Schenker, the band sign a management deal with David Krebs (who managed, among others, Scorpions and Aerosmith).

=== Taking place ===
A self-titled album appeared in 1985 on CBS Records to mild controversy because of the cover art: a scantily-dressed woman lying on her back with her legs spread, forming a V. The hype worked and the album made the charts. But before the first US tour, drummer Van Der Graaf was replaced by Fritz Randow (ex-Eloy). Apart from playing 60 concerts, the band was also in the two largest festivals of the country, Day On The Green in Oakland before 60,000 and the Texxas Jam in front of over 80,000 spectators. After his return to Germany, John Lockton was replaced by the former Accept guitarist, Herman Frank.

With their second album Don't Get Mad... Get Even the band again toured through Europe and America and the single Check's In The Mail gave them a radio hit in the US. The third album Hungry Hearts came out in 1987 leading to yet more European and North American live work. A concert in Hamburg was recorded for a live album, which appeared in 1988 under the title That's Live. After its release, Huhn left the band, in order to join Humble Pie. For his replacement the band auditioned, among others, later Thunderhead frontman Ted Bullet, but eventually decided for a 22-year-old Swiss, Fernando Garcia.

The fourth album Culture Killed the Native (released January 1989 in Europe and a month later in the US) achieved #19 in the German charts and also entered the charts in the US again. A Europe tour as support for Gary Moore followed, before Victory started their first headline tour through America, as well as their first concert in Canada. Both singles "Never Satisfied" and "Don't Tell No Lies" again received airplay on Radio and MTV. By 1990, a second studio album with Garcia was released: Temples of Gold appeared in the top 20 in Germany and the first edition of it added a six-song live EP, of recordings made in Los Angeles. An additional US-Tour followed, before the 1992 Album You Bought It You Name It was released.

Victory now ranked alongside Scorpions, Accept and Helloween as the most successful German band but announced their split in 1994 with the double live album Liveline. Two years later, they returned with the new album Voiceprint. Frank was replaced by the new, then Los Angeles-based guitarist Jake Paland (who has also worked with PFL, Timo Maas and Jimmy Somerville amongst others), and Randow by Matthias Liebetruth (who some years later would play for Running Wild). The album's release was accompanied by an extensive tour and the single releases Deep Inside The World and Cyberia, of which the latter again received airplay on all major music TV channels. Varying personal interests among the band members though led to the final dissolution for the band.

=== Later years ===
Newton made a name as a producer (he worked on Helloween's Keeper of the seven keys), Knorn became manager of Uli Jon Roth, Glenn Hughes and Michael Schenker. Huhn joined (in 2000) Foghat and Garcia (from 2004) sang for Swiss metal band Godiva. Randow in the meantime played for Saxon, Liebetruth became drummer for Running Wild and Paland continued working as a studio guitarist and focusing on his own projects.

=== Reunion ===
In 2002, rumours of a reunion of Victory started. Garcia declined to participate, which made it all the more surprising that in 2003, the album Instinct appeared with the almost original lineup of Huhn, Newton, Frank, Knorn and Randow. Victory played some concerts in Russia and Bulgaria as well as Wacken Open Air – a festival in northern Germany. Since Huhn was living in America, tour activities were difficult and he was again replaced, now with Jioti Parcharidis, the singer of Human Fortress.

With Parcharidis, the band released the album Fuel To The Fire, containing re-recordings of their best-known songs in January 2006. Thereafter yet another line-up change followed. Randow left Victory and was replaced by former Sanvoisen drummer Achim Keller. Appearances followed at Bang Your Head!!! and Sweden Rock-festival as well as a European tour in support of Metal Church in May and June 2007. Four years later the band released Don't Talk Science in what they were calling their final album. The album was recorded in 2009 and was released in May 2011 on Label Golden Core/ZYX music.

== Members ==
- Herman Frank – guitar (1986–1995, 2005–present)
- Christos Mamalitsidis – guitar (2013–present)
- Peter Pichl – bass (2013–present)
- Michael Wolpers – drums (2013–present)
- Gianni Pontillo – vocals (2019–present)
Victory, live at Rock & Metal Day'z 2025 in Oschersleben/Germany

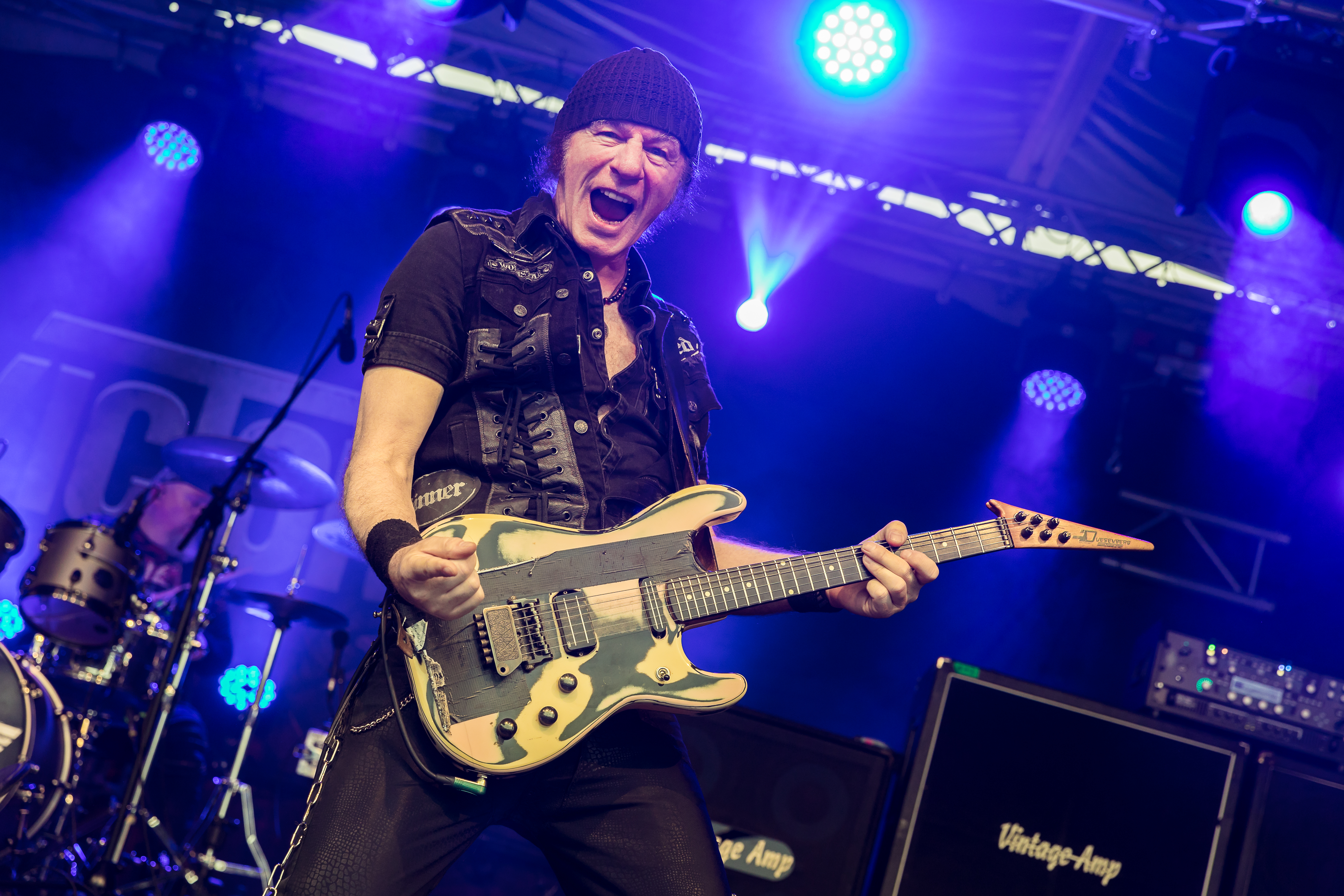
Guitarist Herman Frank

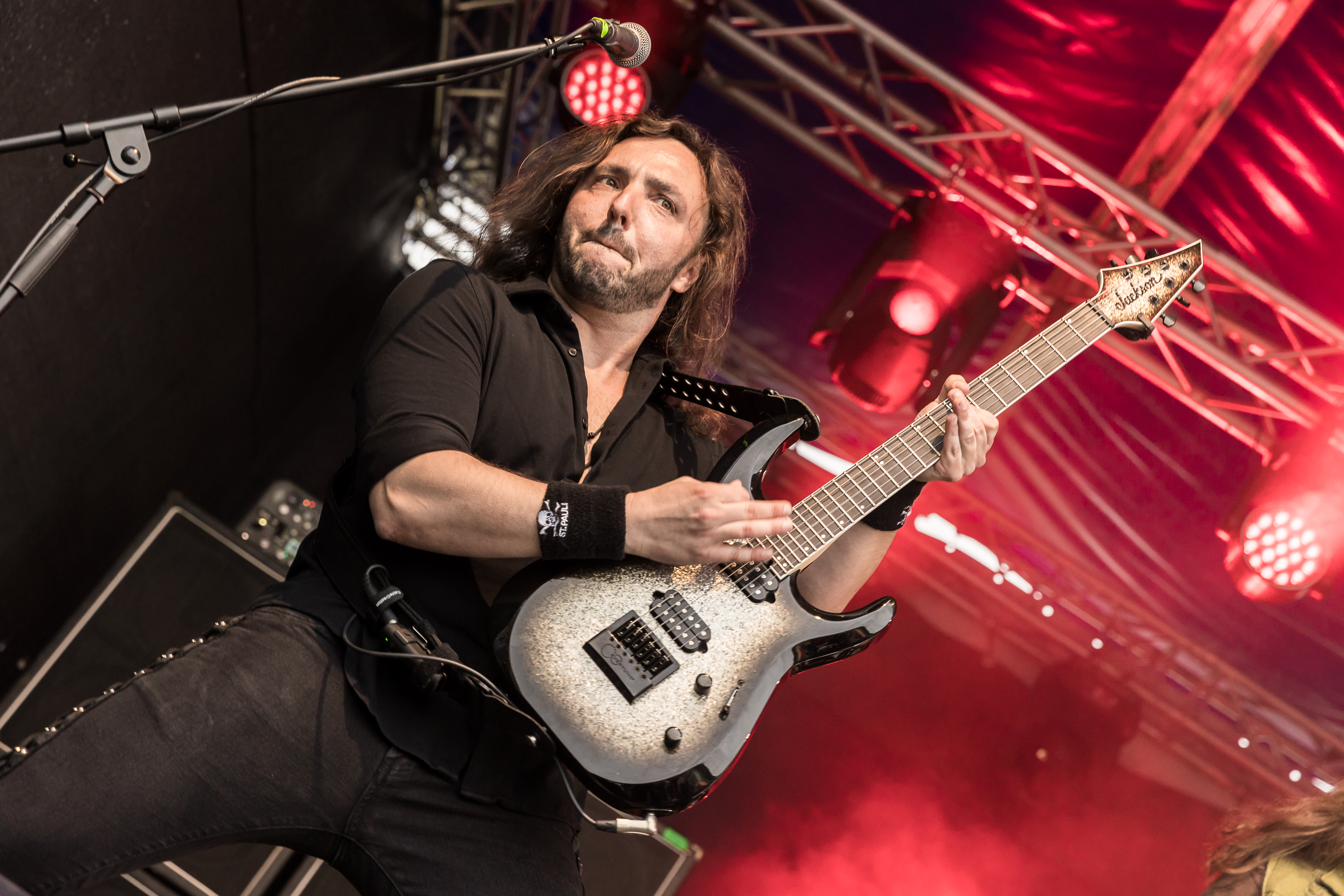
Guitarist Mike Pesin

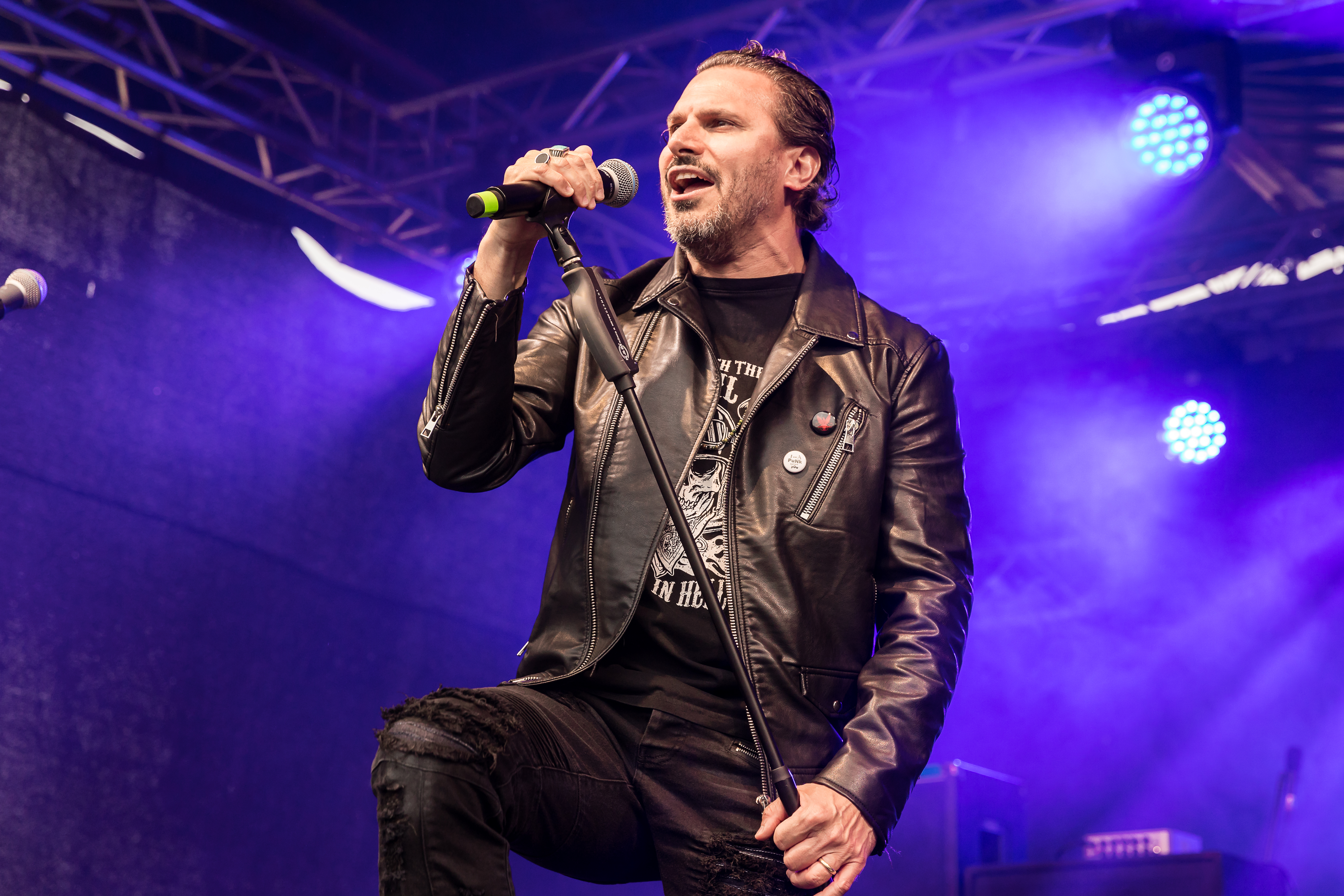
Singer Gianni Pontillo

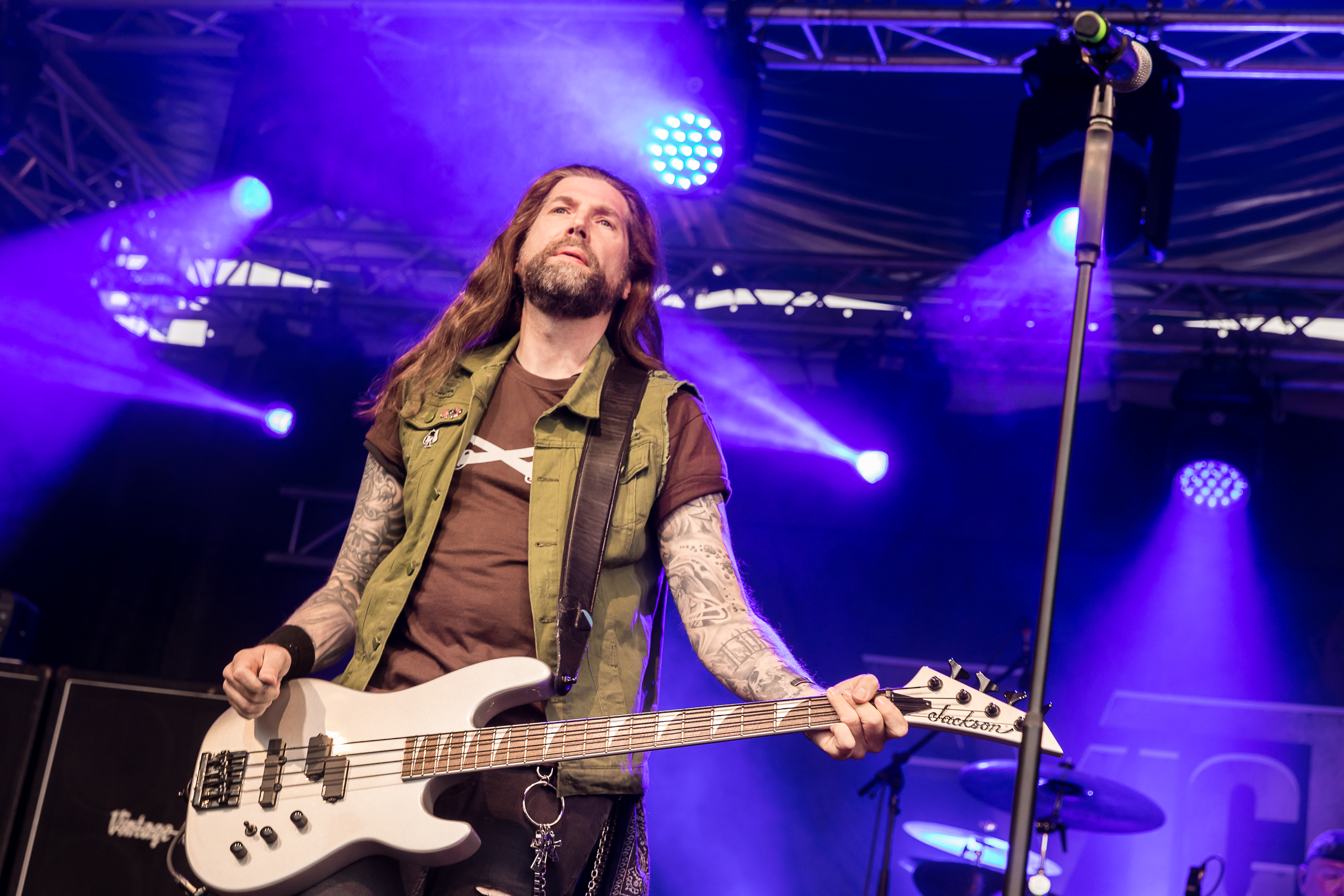
Bassist Malte Burkert

=== Past members ===
- Tommy Newton – guitars (1984–2011)
- Peter Knorn – bass (1984–2011)
- John Lockton – guitar (1984–1986)
- Bernie Van Der Graaf – drums (1984–1985)
- Pedro Schemm – vocals (1984)
- Charlie Huhn – vocals (1984–1988, 2003–2005)
- Fritz Randow – drums (1985–1995, 2002–2006)
- Fernando Garcia – vocals (1988–1996)
- Jake Paland – guitar (1996)
- Matthias Liebetruth – drums (1996)
- Jioti Parcharidis – vocals (2005–2019)
- Achim Keller – drums (2006–2011)

== Discography ==
=== Studio albums ===
- 1985 Victory
- 1986 Don't Get Mad... Get Even
- 1987 Hungry Hearts
- 1989 Culture Killed the Native
- 1990 Temples of Gold
- 1992 You Bought It – You Name It
- 1996 Voiceprint
- 2003 Instinct
- 2006 Fuel to the Fire (re-recordings of older songs)
- 2011 Don't Talk Science
- 2021 Gods of Tomorrow
- 2024 Circle of Life

=== Live albums & compilations ===
- 1988 That's Live (live)
- 1992 The Very Best Of – Rock 'n' Roll Kids Forever (best of)
- 1994 Liveline (live)

=== Singles & EPs ===
- 1986 Check's in the Mail
- 1987 Feel the Fire
- 1989 Never Satisfied
- 1989 Don't Tell No Lies
- 1990 Rock 'n' Roll Kids Forever
- 1992 Rock-o-Matic
- 1992 Lost in the Night
- 1996 Deep Inside the World
- 1996 Cyberia

=== Videos & DVDs ===
- 1990 The Videos (VHS)
