= Foghat =

English rock band

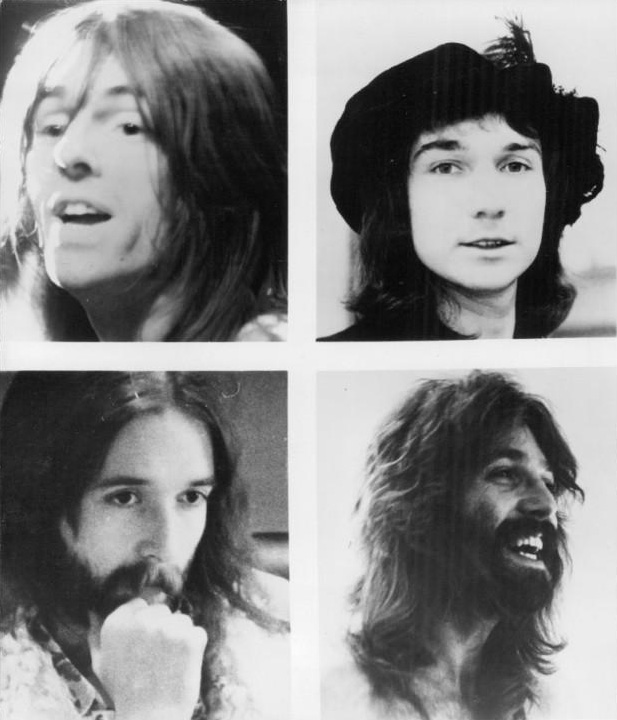
- Group members in 1973, as pictured on the back cover of Foghat's second album; clockwise from top left: "Lonesome" Dave Peverett, Tony Stevens, Roger Earl, Rod "The Bottle" Price

Background information
- Origin: London, England
- Genres: Hard rock; blues rock; boogie rock
- Years active: 1971–1984; 1993–present
- Labels: Bearsville; Atlantic; Rhino
- Spinoff of: Savoy Brown
- Members: Roger Earl; Bryan Bassett; Rodney O'Quinn; Scott Holt
- Past members: Dave Peverett; Rod Price; Tony Stevens; Nick Jameson; Craig MacGregor; Erik Cartwright; Charlie Huhn
- Website: foghat.com

Foghat are an English rock band formed in London in 1971. The band are known for the use of electric slide guitar in their music. Their best known song is the 1975 hit "Slow Ride". The band have released 17 studio albums, including eight gold albums and one platinum, along with one double platinum live album. Despite several line-up changes, the band continue to record and perform.

AllMusic classed the band's style as "boogie-blues" and further described it as "simple, hard-rocking blues-rock".

== History ==
=== 1970s ===
The band initially featured Dave Peverett ("Lonesome Dave") on guitar and vocals, Tony Stevens on bass, and Roger Earl on drums, after all three musicians left Savoy Brown in December 1970. Rod Price, on guitar/slide guitar, joined after he left Black Cat Bones. The new line-up was named "Foghat" (a nonsense word from a Scrabble-like game played by Peverett and his brother) in January 1971. There is a cartoon drawing on the back cover of the group's first album of a head wearing a foghat.

Foghat relocated to the United States after signing a deal with Bearsville Records. Its debut album, Foghat (1972), was produced by Dave Edmunds and featured a cover of Willie Dixon's "I Just Want to Make Love to You", which received considerable airplay, especially on FM stations. The album also included a remake of Savoy Brown's bluesy ode to the road "Leavin' Again (Again!)", and "Sarah Lee", a classic blues burner featuring Price's slide guitar solo. The band's second self-titled album went gold. It was also known as Foghat (Rock and Roll) for its cover photo of a rock and a bread roll. Energized (1974) came out, followed by Rock and Roll Outlaws (1974) and Fool for the City (1975). In 1974, Stevens left the band due to their relentless touring schedule and was temporarily replaced by producer Nick Jameson for the recording of Fool for the City. During the next year, Jameson was replaced by Craig MacGregor, and the group released Night Shift (1976), a live album (1977) and Stone Blue (1978), each attaining gold status in record sales. Fool for the City spawned the hit single "Slow Ride" (which reached No. 20 in the United States and No. 14 in Canada), but the greatest sales figures were reached by Foghat Live, which went double platinum. More hits followed: "Drivin' Wheel", "I Just Want to Make Love to You" (from the live album), "Stone Blue", and "Third Time Lucky (First Time I Was a Fool)". Price left the band in November 1980, unhappy with the group's still constant touring and shifting away from the hard boogie sound toward a more new wave-influenced pop direction. By February 1981, after months of auditions, he was replaced by Erik Cartwright.

=== 1980s ===
After 1978, Foghat's record sales began to slip, and their last album for the Bearsville label, Zig-Zag Walk (1983), only briefly touched the charts at number 192. MacGregor quit in 1982, and Jameson returned to play on In the Mood for Something Rude and Zig Zag Walk before being replaced by Kenny Aaronson (1983) and then Rob Alter (1983-1984). MacGregor returned in 1984.

The band briefly disbanded in 1984 after Peverett left and returned to England. Earl, along with MacGregor and Cartwright, reformed with a new singer/guitarist, Eric (E.J.) Burgeson, and continued touring as Foghat into the early 1990s. MacGregor (1986-1987, 1991, 1993), Cartwright's brother Brett Cartwright (1987, 1988–1989) and Jeff Howell (1987-1988, 1989–1991) alternated on bass during that period, while Phil Nudelman (1989-1990) and Billy Davis (1990-1993) took over for Burgeson. Dave Crigger joined on bass in 1992–1993.

=== 1990s ===
Peverett had returned to the United States by 1990 and formed his own version of the band, Lonesome Dave's Foghat, which featured Bryan Bassett (ex-Wild Cherry), Stephen Dees (bass) and Eddie Zyne (drums). Dees and Zyne had played with Hall & Oates, among others. Former Molly Hatchet bassist Riff West replaced Dees in 1991, and Price made several guest appearances.

In 1993, the original line-up reunited at the urging of producer Rick Rubin. Although Rubin ultimately proved to be unavailable to produce their comeback project, the group went ahead and released a studio album titled Return of the Boogie Men (1994), with production duties being filled by a returning Nick Jameson, who had briefly served as the band's unofficial bassist during the peak of their career, in addition to producing several of the band's albums, along with the Road Cases live album (1998). The band's final album of the decade, King Biscuit Flower Hour (taken from the syndicated radio show of the same name), was released in May 1999 and consisted of live recordings from 1974 and 1976. After being back together for six years, the original line-up once again ended after Price decided to retire from touring for good. Bassett (who had been playing with Molly Hatchet), from Lonesome Dave's Foghat, was brought in on guitar.

=== 2000s ===
The 2000s saw the deaths of founding members Peverett and Price. Peverett died on 7 February 2000, aged 56, from complications from kidney cancer.

Charlie Huhn (formerly of Humble Pie, Ted Nugent, and Victory) was brought in to replace him on lead vocals and guitar. This line-up of Earl, Stevens, Bassett and Huhn recorded the album Family Joules (2003).

Price died on 22 March 2005, aged 57, due to a fall resulting from a heart attack. Later that year, original bassist Stevens left the band and was replaced by former bassist MacGregor.

=== 2010s ===
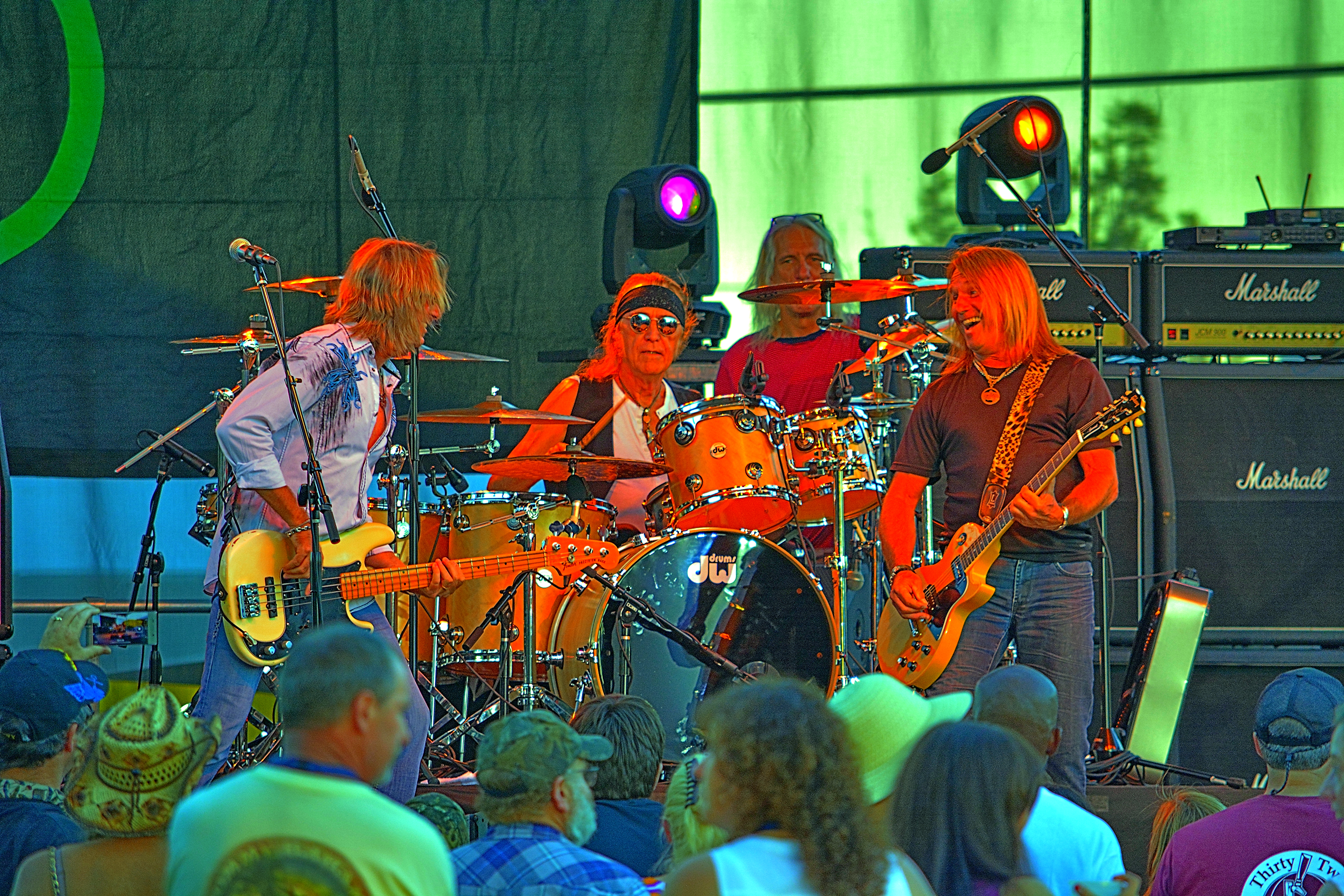
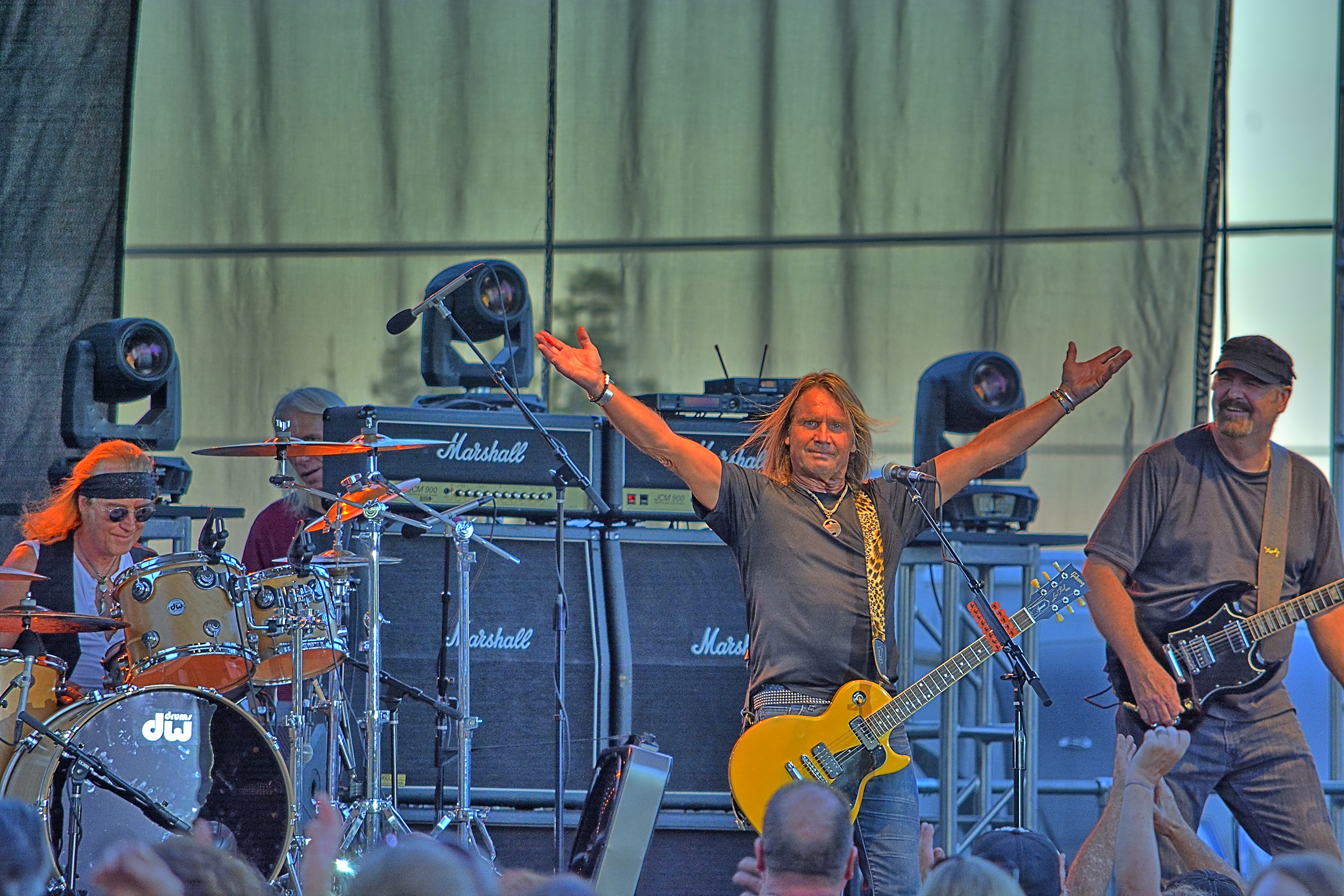
Foghat performing in 2015

The 2010 version of Foghat consisted of Earl, MacGregor, Huhn and Bassett. Former Rainbow and Black Sabbath drummer Bobby Rondinelli had temporarily replaced Earl for a summer 2010 concert, while Earl was recovering from surgery. At another Foghat concert that summer, after Earl had returned to the band, bassist Jeff Howell temporarily replaced an ill MacGregor. Foghat's next album, Last Train Home (released 15 June 2010), was the culmination of a dream shared by Earl and Peverett. It contained some of their favourite blues songs, three originals ("Born for the Road", "Last Train Home" and "495 Boogie"), and two songs by special guest performer and longtime friend Eddie Kirkland, who was 86 years old at the time. He had played with Foghat as a guest in 1977 at Foghat's "Tribute to the Blues" show at New York City's Palladium, and remained a good friend of the band until he was killed in a car accident on 27 February 2011.

Also performing on Last Train Home were Howell (bass), Colin Earl (piano) and Lefty Lefkowitz (harmonica). According to Earl, the album was "a testimony to Lonesome Dave. We always planned to do this. I am so fortunate to have partners in band members Charlie Huhn and Bryan Bassett who share the same passion for the blues. It was not hard work putting this album together; playing this kind of music is joyous. We had a blast!"

The band released a DVD in December 2013 called Live in St. Pete.

On 10 November 2015, Foghat announced that they would start work on a new studio album, completely fan-funded through PledgeMusic. The album, titled Under the Influence, was released on 24 June 2016. The album went on to chart and debuted at No. 17 on Billboard's Hard Rock Albums, and peaked at No. 40 on the Independent Album charts.

The band went on to release another live album, Live at the Belly Up, in June 2017. On 9 July 2017, Erik Cartwright, who played lead guitar from 1981 to 1984, died at his home in Nashville, Tennessee, from a heart attack. He was 66 years old.

Longtime bassist MacGregor was diagnosed with stage IV lung cancer in 2015. The cancer was first detected at an earlier stage in 2012, but MacGregor was not informed until 2015. Following this incident, he became a proponent of a bill that would require physicians to communicate test results with patients promptly. Although still officially a member of Foghat, the effects of chemotherapy made him unable to play music. Former Pat Travers bassist Rodney O'Quinn filled in for him on tours. MacGregor died on 9 February 2018.

Matt Barranti substituted on guitar for Bryan Bassett for a gig at Palace Theater in Greensburg, Pennsylvania on 11 February 2017.

=== 2020s ===
The lineup of Earl, Bassett, Huhn and O'Quinn went on to record a live record in November 2019 called 8 Days on the Road. The album was released in July 2021.

In January 2022 lead singer Charlie Huhn retired and Scott Holt, formerly a guitarist for Buddy Guy, became the new lead singer and guitarist. Holt had previously lent his vocals for Under the Influence and was lead vocalist in Foghat side project Earl & the Agitators.

In August 2023 Foghat announced plans to release their 17th studio album, Sonic Mojo, with first single being "Drivin’ On," co-written by Kim Simmonds from Savoy Brown in November 2023. It was released on 10 November, nearly a year after the ailing Simmonds' death from colon cancer.

In January 2025 Foghat called in current Blue Öyster Cult drummer Jules Radino to sub for an ill Roger Earl until Roger was able to return in May.

Also in 2025, one of the group's crew members, Eddie Lefebvre, began appearing on stage with them playing percussion.

== Members ==
Current

- Roger Earl – drums (1971–1984, 1993–present)
- Bryan Bassett – lead guitar, slide guitar, backing vocals (1999–present)
- Rodney O'Quinn – bass guitar, backing vocals (2015–present)
- Scott Holt – lead vocals, guitar (2022–present)

Former

- Dave Peverett – lead vocals, rhythm guitar (1971–1984, 1993–2000; died 2000)
- Rod Price – lead guitar, slide guitar, backing vocals (1971–1980, 1993–1999; died 2005)
- Tony Stevens – bass guitar, backing vocals (1971–1975, 1993–2005)
- Nick Jameson – bass guitar, keyboards, backing vocals (1975–1976, 1982–1983)
- Craig MacGregor – bass guitar, backing vocals (1976–1982, 1984, 2005–2015; died 2018)
- Erik Cartwright – lead guitar, backing vocals (1981–1984; died 2017)
- Kenny Aaronson – bass guitar (1983)
- Rob Alter – bass guitar (1983–1984)
- Charlie Huhn – lead vocals, guitar (2000–2022)

== Discography ==
=== Studio albums ===
Title	Album details	Peak chart positions						Certifications
Title	Album details	CAN	US	US Blues	US Hard Rock	US Indie	AUS	Certifications
Foghat	Released: July 1972; Label: Bearsville	—	127	—	—	—	23	US:Gold
Foghat (Rock and Roll)	Released: March 1973; Label: Bearsville	—	67	—	—	—	—	
Energized	Released: January 6, 1974; Label: Bearsville	38	34	—	—	—	—	US: Gold
Rock and Roll Outlaws	Released: October 1974; Label: Bearsville	82	40	—	—	—	—	US: Gold
Fool for the City	Released: September 15, 1975; Label: Bearsville	85	23	—	—	—	—	US: Platinum
Night Shift	Released: November 1976; Label: Bearsville	77	36	—	—	—	—	US: Gold
Stone Blue	Released: May 1978; Label: Bearsville	21	25	—	—	—	82	US: Gold
Boogie Motel	Released: September 21, 1979; Label: Bearsville	—	35	—	—	—	—	
Tight Shoes	Released: May 28, 1980; Label: Bearsville	76	106	—	—	—	—	
Girls to Chat & Boys to Bounce	Released: July 1981; Label: Bearsville	—	92	—	—	—	—	
In the Mood for Something Rude	Released: October 18, 1982; Label: Bearsville	—	162	—	—	—	—	
Zig-Zag Walk	Released: May 11, 1983; Label: Bearsville	—	192	—	—	—	—	
Return of the Boogie Men	Released: 1994; Label: Modern	—	—	—	—	—	—	
Family Joules	Released: 2003; Label: Varese Sarabande	—	—	—	—	—	—	
Last Train Home	Released: June 15, 2010; Label: Foghat	—	—	—	—	—	—	
Under the Influence	Released: June 24, 2016; Label: Foghat	—	—	—	17	40	—	
Sonic Mojo	Released: November 10, 2023; Label: Foghat	—	—	1	—	—	—	
"—" denotes releases that did not chart or were not released in that territory.

=== Live albums ===
Title	Album details	Peak chart positions		Certifications
Title	Album details	CAN	US	Certifications
Foghat Live	Released: August 19, 1977; Label: Bearsville	5	11	US: 2 X Platinum
Road Cases	Released: January 1998; Label: Plum; SPV	—	—	
Extended Versions: The Encore Collection	Released: April 1, 2001; Label: BMG	—	—	
Decades Live	Released: 2003; Label: Sanctuary	—	—	
Live II	Released: June 2007; Label: Locomotive; Foghat	—	—	
Live at the Blues Warehouse	Released: 2009; Label: Varese Sarabande	—	—	
Live at the Belly Up	Released: February 17, 2017; Label: Foghat	—	—	
8 Days on the Road	Released: July 2021; Label: Foghat	—	—	
Slow Ride - Live In Concert	Released: 2024; Label: Cleopatra	—	—	
"—" denotes releases that did not chart or were not released in that territory.

=== Compilations ===
Title	Album details	Certifications
The Best of Foghat	Released: April 16, 1989; Label: Rhino	US: Gold
The Best of Foghat, Volume 2	Released: January 24, 1992; Label: Rhino	
Slow Ride and Other Hits	Released: 1997; Label: Flashback/Rhino	
Anthology [2-CD] (includes reissue of the 1972 Foghat album)	Released: 1999; Label: Castle	
Hits You Remember - Live	Released: 2001; Label: Madacy	
The Essentials	Released: 2002; Label: Bearsville/Rhino	
The Definitive Rock Collection [2-CD]	Released: October 17, 2006; Label: Rhino	
Drivin' Wheels: Best of 1972-1982 [2-CD]	Released: November 14, 2014; Label: Raven	
"—" denotes releases that did not chart or were not released in that territory.

=== Singles ===
Year	Title	Peak chart positions		
Year	Title	US	AUS	CAN
1972	"I Just Want to Make Love to You"	83	31	—
1973	"What a Shame"	82	—	—
1973	"Ride, Ride, Ride"	—	—	—
1974	"That'll Be the Day"	—	—	—
1974	"Step Outside"	—	—	—
1975	"Slow Ride"	20	—	14
1976	"Fool for the City"	45	—	—
1976	"Drivin' Wheel"	34	—	41
1977	"I'll Be Standing By"	67	—	—
1977	"I Just Want to Make Love to You" (live)	33	—	28
1978	"Stone Blue"	36	—	61
1978	"High On Love"	—	—	—
1979	"Third Time Lucky (First Time I Was a Fool)"	23	86	33
1980	"Somebody's Been Sleepin' in My Bed"	—	—	—
1980	"Stranger in My Home Town"	81	—	—
1981	"Wide Boy"	—	—	—
1981	"Live Now – Pay Later"	—	—	—
1982	"Slipped, Tripped, Fell in Love"	—	—	—
1983	"That's What Love Can Do"	—	—	—
"—" denotes releases that did not chart.

"Live Now – Pay Later" reached No. 15 on the Billboard Mainstream Rock Airplay Chart.

"Slipped, Tripped, Fell in Love" reached No. 12 on the Billboard Mainstream Rock Airplay Chart.
