= Foghat (1973 album) =

Studio album by Foghat

Studio album by Foghat
- Released: March 1973
- Recorded: 1973
- Genre: Blues rock, rock and roll, hard rock
- Length: 38:29
- Label: Bearsville
- Producer: Tom Dawes

Foghat chronology
Foghat (1972)	Foghat (1973)	Energized (1974)

Professional ratings
Review scores
Source	Rating
Allmusic	link

Foghat is the second album, and the second self-titled album, by the English rock band Foghat, released in March 1973. It is generally known by fans as Rock 'n' Roll, because of its cover picture depicting a rock and bread roll, a concept thought up by art director and filmmaker Robert Downey Sr.

== Track listing ==
1. "Ride, Ride, Ride" (Dave Peverett, Rod Price) – 4:24
2. "I Feel So Bad" (Chuck Willis) – 5:09
3. "Long Way to Go" (Peverett, Price, Tony Stevens, Roger Earl) – 5:07
4. "It's Too Late" (Peverett, Price) – 5:45
5. "What a Shame" (Price) – 3:52
6. "Helpin' Hand" (Peverett, Price, Stevens, Earl) – 4:41
7. "Road Fever" (Peverett, Price) – 4:23
8. "She's Gone" (Peverett, Price) – 3:12
9. "Couldn't Make Her Stay" (Peverett) – 1:57

== Personnel ==
- Dave Peverett – vocals, rhythm guitar
- Rod Price – lead and slide guitars
- Tony Stevens – bass
- Roger Earl – drums
- unknown sax on "What a Shame"

== Charts ==
Chart (1973)	Peak position
US Billboard 200	67
