= Foghat (1972 album) =

Studio album by Foghat

Studio album by Foghat
- Released: July 1972
- Recorded: 1972
- Studio: Rockfield (Monmouthshire, Wales)
- Genre: Blues rock, hard rock, blues
- Length: 38:05
- Label: Bearsville
- Producer: Dave Edmunds

Foghat chronology
Foghat (1972)	Foghat (Rock and Roll) (1973)

Professional ratings
Review scores
Source	Rating
AllMusic	link

Foghat is the debut studio album by American-based English rock band Foghat. The first of their two self-titled albums, it was released in 1972 on Bearsville Records.

== Track listing ==
1. "I Just Want to Make Love to You" (Willie Dixon) – 4:21
2. "Trouble, Trouble" (Dave Peverett) – 3:20
3. "Leavin' Again (Again!)" (Peverett, Tony Stevens) – 3:36
4. "Fool's Hall of Fame" (Peverett) – 2:58
5. "Sarah Lee" (Peverett, Rod Price) – 4:36
6. "Highway (Killing Me)" (Peverett, Price) – 3:51
7. "Maybelline" [sic] (Chuck Berry) – 3:33
8. "A Hole to Hide In" (Peverett, Price, Roger Earl) – 4:06
9. "Gotta Get to Know You" (Deadric Malone, Andre Williams) – 7:44

== Personnel ==
Foghat

- Dave Peverett – vocals, rhythm guitar
- Rod Price – lead and slide guitar, dobro
- Tony Stevens – bass guitar, harmony vocals
- Roger Earl – drums, percussion

Additional musicians

- Colin Earl – piano
- Dave Edmunds – additional guitars
- Kipps – unknown
- Todd Rundgren – piano on "Trouble Trouble"
- John Williams – additional bass
- Andy Fairweather Low – backing vocals

Production

- Dave Edmunds – production
- Ralph Downs and Kingsley Ward – engineering
- Dave Edmunds; Nick Jameson (tracks 5 and 7) – mixing

== Charts ==
Chart (1972)	Peak position
Australian Albums (Kent Music Report)	23
US Billboard 200	127

== Certifications ==
Region	Certification	Certified units/sales
United States (RIAA)	Gold	500,000^{^}
^{^} Shipments figures based on certification alone.
