= Girls to Chat & Boys to Bounce =

Studio album by Foghat
- Released: July 1981
- Recorded: 1981
- Genres: Rock, blues rock
- Length: 39:05
- Labels: Bearsville (original release); Rhino (2006 CD reissue)
- Producer: Nick Jameson

Foghat chronology
Tight Shoes (1980)	Girls to Chat & Boys to Bounce (1981)	In the Mood for Something Rude (1982)

Professional ratings
Review scores
Source	Rating
AllMusic	3/5 stars

Girls to Chat & Boys to Bounce is the tenth studio album by British rock band Foghat, released in 1981. It was the first with new guitarist Erik Cartwright. The album peaked at No. 92 on the Billboard 200, making it a slight improvement over the group's previous record, Tight Shoes. In addition, the album's single "Live Now, Pay Later" bubbled under the Billboard Hot 100 at No. 102 and also hit No. 15 on the Mainstream Rock chart.

== Track listing ==
All tracks by Dave Peverett except where noted.

1. "Wide Boy" – 2:44
2. "Let Me Get Close to You" (Nick Jameson) – 5:36
3. "Live Now – Pay Later" – 6:08
4. "Love Zone" – 5:19
5. "Delayed Reaction" – 6:14
6. "Second Childhood" – 5:15
7. "Weekend Driver" – 4:13
8. "Sing About Love" (Live) (Jameson) – 3:36

== Personnel ==
- Lonesome Dave Peverett – lead and backing vocals, rhythm guitar
- Erik Cartwright – lead guitar, backing vocals
- Craig MacGregor – bass
- Roger Earl – drums, percussion
- Nick Jameson – keyboards, backing vocals

== Charts ==
Chart (1981)	Peak position
US Billboard 200	92
