= Slow Ride =

1975 single by Foghat

Single by Foghat

from the album Fool for the City
- B-side: "Save Your Loving (For Me)"
- Released: December 1975
- Recorded: Suntreader Studios, Sharon, Vermont
- Genre: Hard rock
- Length: 8:14 (LP version); 3:56 (single version)
- Label: Bearsville
- Songwriter: Dave Peverett
- Producer: Nick Jameson

Foghat singles chronology
"Step Outside" (1974)	"Slow Ride" (1975)	"Fool for the City" (1976)

Audio
- "Slow Ride" on YouTube

"Slow Ride" is a song by the English rock band Foghat. It was the lead single from their fifth studio album, Fool for the City (1975), released on Bearsville Records. In 2009, it was named the 45th "Best Hard Rock" song of all time by VH1.

There are five versions of the song. The original LP version from Fool for the City lasts 8 minutes and 14 seconds. The single version, found in several compilations, was truncated to 3:56 with a fade-out ending. The 1977 live version is 8:21, the King Biscuit Flower Hour Foghat version is 10:37 and the 2007 live version is 9:44.

According to drummer Roger Earl, the song was created during a jam session with then new bassist Nick Jameson.

Nick had a cassette player and he would record whatever we played there. As I recall it, the whole song was written – the middle part and the bass part and the ending were all Nick's ideas. Basically, Nick wrote the song, but we just jammed on it, and Nick cut the stuff up so it made sense as far as the song goes. And then Dave [Peverett, the band's then guitarist and vocalist] said, 'I've got some words.' That's how that came about (laughs).

The song is the band's highest charting Billboard single and remains a staple of classic rock.

== Charts ==
=== Weekly charts ===
Chart (1975–76)	Peak position
Canada Top Singles (RPM)	14
US Billboard Hot 100	20

=== Year-end charts ===
Chart (1976)	Peak position
Canada Top Singles (RPM)	133
US Billboard Hot 100	133

== Certifications ==
Region	Certification	Certified units/sales
New Zealand (RMNZ)	Gold	15,000^{‡}
^{‡} Sales+streaming figures based on certification alone.
