= Dave Peverett =

English musician (1943–2000)

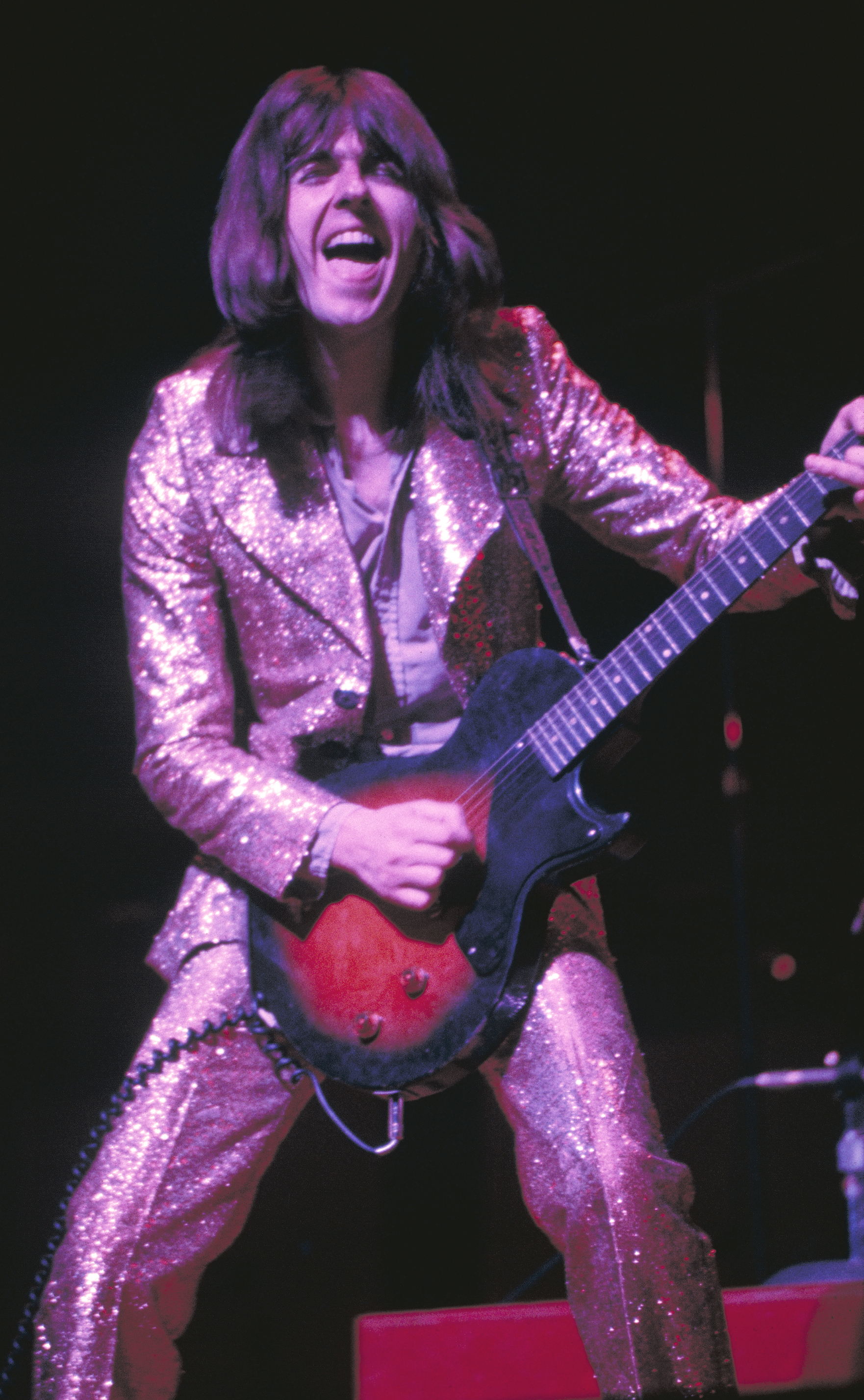
- Peverett performing in 1973

Background information
- Also known as: Lonesome Dave
- Born: David Jack Peverett; 16 April 1943; Dulwich, London, England
- Died: 7 February 2000 (aged 56) Orlando, Florida, United States
- Genres: Hard rock; blues rock; boogie rock; rock and roll
- Occupations: Musician; singer-songwriter
- Instruments: Vocals; guitar
- Years active: 1967–2000
- Labels: Decca; Deram; Bearsville; Columbia
- Formerly of: Savoy Brown; Foghat

David Jack Peverett (16 April 1943 – 7 February 2000), also known as Lonesome Dave, was an English singer and guitarist, and the original lead vocalist and rhythm guitarist of the rock band Foghat, which he co-founded following his tenure in Savoy Brown.

== Early years ==
Peverett was a fan of the blues and of blues-based rock and roll, and played these forms while performing. In the formative pre-Beatles early 1960s, he was the vocalist and lead guitarist of the Nocturnes, which included his brother John Peverett (later to be Rod Stewart's road manager before becoming a Baptist pastor in the United States) on drums, Keith Sutton on rhythm guitar, and Brixton neighbour Al "Boots" Collins (later to be editor of tourist magazines in the West Indies and Middle East) on tenor sax. The Nocturnes achieved London popularity as a pub and club band and provided backing for other performers at a recording studio in Soho. After a brief tour with Swiss blues band Les Questions (during which time he was billed as Lonesome Dave Jaxx), Dave joined Savoy Brown as a rhythm guitarist, eventually taking over as lead singer. After five albums with Savoy Brown he decided to pursue his own path along with drummer Roger Earl and took bassist Tony Stevens with them.

== The beginning of Foghat ==
The new project took form with the addition of lead guitarist Rod Price in 1971. Peverett decided to call the new band Foghat (thought by some, mistakenly, to be a pun on the F word); this was actually a nonsense word he had made up as a child while playing Scrabble with his brother John. He used his new word to create Junior Foghat, an imaginary childhood playmate who became an alter ego and therefore the genesis of the "Lonesome Dave" persona that he was to employ as a performer. Foghat soon recorded their first, self-titled album for Bearsville Records, with Todd Rundgren and Dave Edmunds each producing tracks. With the success of an early single, a cover version of Willie Dixon's "I Just Want to Make Love to You", their debut release soon went gold.

== Foghat success ==
This would be the first of many gold and platinum albums for Peverett. In 1974, Foghat released two gold albums, Energized and Rock and Roll Outlaws. Their first platinum album, Fool for the City, was released in 1975, producing two hit singles: the title track, and "Slow Ride". Fool for the City featured Nick Jameson on bass, temporarily replacing Foghat bassist Tony Stevens. Jameson also toured with Foghat in support of the album.

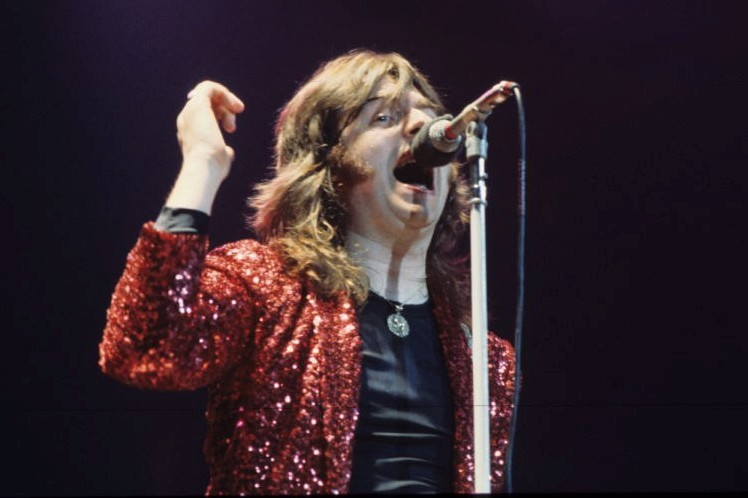
Peverett performing

In 1976, with the addition of bassist Craig MacGregor, they began touring even larger venues, and recorded another gold album, Night Shift, followed by the highly successful 1977 Foghat Live album. Their next album, Stone Blue, was again certified gold. In 1984, Peverett quit the band to move back to England. He returned to touring shortly thereafter with his own version of the band, called Lonesome Dave's Foghat.

== Reunion and death ==
At the encouragement of Rick Rubin, Peverett reunited with the original Foghat line-up in 1993, beginning the first of several tours. He continued to write and record songs not only for Foghat, but also for a wide variety of projects, until his death from kidney cancer on February 7, 2000. He even embarked on what would become his final tour after receiving months of intensive chemotherapy and radiation treatments.

== Discography ==
=== With Savoy Brown ===
- Getting to the Point (1968)
- Blue Matter (1969)
- A Step Further (1969)
- Raw Sienna (1970)
- Looking In (1970)

=== With Warren Phillips & The Rockets ===
- The World of Rock And Roll (1969) originally issued on Decca (UK) PA-43; also issued in 1971 on Parrot (US) PAS-71044 as Rocked Out!; reissued in 1979 on London (US) LC-50018 as Before Foghat Days. Personnel: Lonesome Dave-guitar/vocal, Tone Stevens-bass, Roger Earl-drums, Bob Hall-piano.

=== With Foghat ===
- Foghat (1972)
- Foghat (Rock and Roll) (1973)
- Energized (1974)
- Rock and Roll Outlaws (1974)
- Fool for the City (1975)
- Night Shift (1976)
- Foghat Live (1977)
- Stone Blue (1978)
- Boogie Motel (1979)
- Tight Shoes (1980)
- Girls to Chat & Boys to Bounce (1981)
- In the Mood for Something Rude (1982)
- Zig-Zag Walk (1983)
- Return of the Boogie Men (1994)
- Road Cases (1998)
- Decades Live (2003)

=== Rattlesnake Guitar: The Music of Peter Green (1997) ===
- Dave Peverett / Rod Price "Love That Burns"
- Dave Peverett / Rod Price "If You Be My Baby"
