= I Just Want to Make Love to You =

Song written by Willie Dixon

"Just Make Love to Me"

Single by Muddy Waters and His Guitar
- B-side: "Oh Yeh"
- Released: May 1954
- Recorded: Chicago, April 13, 1954
- Genre: Chicago blues
- Length: 2:49
- Label: Chess
- Songwriter: Willie Dixon
- Producers: Leonard Chess, Phil Chess

"I Just Want to Make Love to You" is a blues song written by Willie Dixon. In 1954, it was recorded by Muddy Waters, and released as a single with the title "Just Make Love to Me". The song reached number four on Billboard magazine's R&B Best Sellers chart.

Backing Waters on vocals are Little Walter on harmonica, Jimmy Rogers on guitar, Otis Spann on piano, Willie Dixon on bass, and Fred Below on drums. Waters recorded the song again for the album Electric Mud (1968).

== Versions by other artists ==
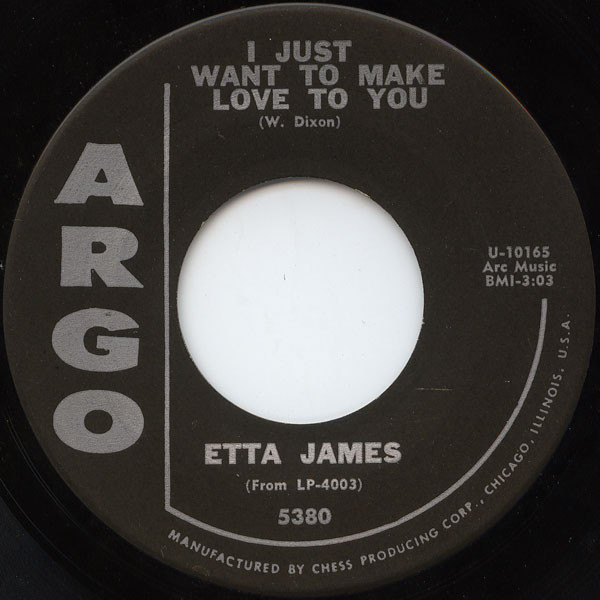
1960 US release of the Etta James recording

In 1960, Etta James recorded the song for her debut album, At Last! Her rendition also served as the B-side to her hit of that name. In 1996, it was released as a single in the UK and other European markets after being featured in a Diet Coke advertising campaign. The single reached No. 5 in the UK, No. 7 in Ireland, and No. 27 in the Netherlands.

Two Australian groups, blues rags ‘n’ hollers and the soul agents (not to be confused with the British group of the same name) both released their own covers of the song, both singles being very sought after in todays market.

The Rolling Stones covered the song on their 1964 debut album, The Rolling Stones.

British rock group Mungo Jerry released an extended nine-minute version of the song on their second album, Electronically Tested (1971).

In 1972, British rock group Foghat recorded a studio version for their self-titled debut album. The song was also released as a single and it became their first single to reach the charts, appearing at No. 83 on the Billboard Hot 100 and No. 31 in Australia. An eight-minute version from a 1977 concert performance is included on Foghat Live. It was edited down to 3:56 release as a single, which reached number 33 on the Billboard Hot 100 and No. 28 on the RPM Top Singles chart in Canada.

Scottish rock band the Sensational Alex Harvey Band also recorded a version of the song for their 1972 LP Framed.

A version by Rod Stewart was released as a bonus track on the German cassette edition of his album Foolish Behaviour (1980).

Jeff Healey Band recorded a version to be included in the 1989 movie Road House, but it ended up not appearing in the movie. The song was released in their 2024 album Road House (The Lost Soundtrack).
