= Tony Stevens =

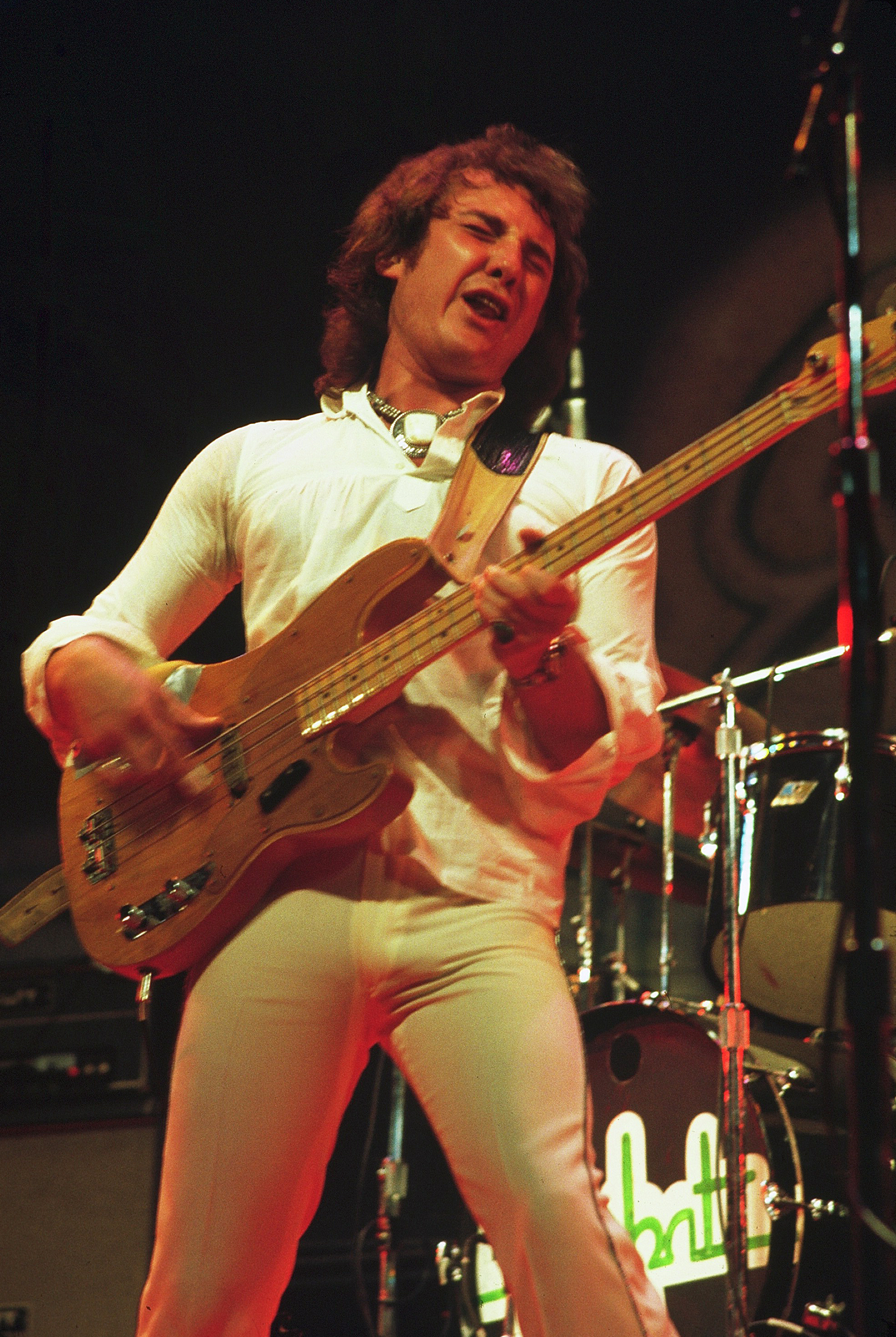
- Tony Stevens in 1973

Background information
- Also known as: Tone Stevens
- Born: 12 September 1949 (age 76); London, England
- Occupations: Bassist; songwriter
- Instruments: Bass guitar; vocals
- Years active: 1968–present

Tony Stevens (born 12 September 1949) is an English musician, best known as the bassist with the bands Foghat, Savoy Brown, and Nobody's Business.

== Career ==
Stevens joined the British blues-rock band Savoy Brown in 1968, and contributed to four of that band's albums over the next two years as bassist and songwriter. Savoy Brown, which also included drummer Roger Earl, guitarist Kim Simmonds and singer/guitarist "Lonesome" Dave Peverett, built a healthy following in the U.K. and U.S. through extensive touring; they were notable enough in the U.S. that, on 7 September 1969, Stevens became a subject of American performance artist/groupie Cynthia Albritton, better known as "Cynthia Plaster Caster." Savoy Brown's most successful album during Stevens' tenure with them was Looking In, whose centerpiece song, "Leavin' Again," he co-authored. Released in 1970, Looking In reached number 39 on the U.S. Billboard albums chart.

After a concert tour of the U.S. to support Looking In, Kim Simmonds, Savoy Brown's de facto leader, disbanded this version of the group. Following this, Stevens, Earl and Peverett, along with guitarist Rod Price, founded Foghat in January 1971. This line-up of Foghat released four albums through 1974, the most successful of which was Energized (released February 1974; U.S. Billboard No. 34). The band relocated to the U.S., where Foghat followed Savoy Brown's approach of building a fan base via near-constant touring. Stevens eventually came to dislike spending so much time on the road and away from England, and announced his departure from the band in 1974.

After leaving Foghat, Stevens returned to England and refocused himself on session work. Most notably, Stevens was a member of the band supporting the Thames Television TV series Rock Follies, whose first soundtrack album entered the U.K. album chart at number 1 in 1976. Rock Follies' composer Andy Mackay, best known as saxophonist/oboist with Roxy Music, also enlisted Stevens' services on his 1978 solo album Resolving Contradictions. Stevens launched several new bands during the late 1970s and early 1980s as well, including Midnight Flyer, managed by Led Zeppelin impresario Peter Grant and featuring singer Maggie Bell.

In 1993, music producer Rick Rubin approached the four founding members of Foghat about recording a reunion album. While Rubin ultimately was not involved in the project, Stevens rejoined his ex-bandmates to record 1994's Return of the Boogie Men, and toured with Foghat for the next two years in support of the album. Peverett died in 2000 and Price had left the band yet again in 1999, leaving Stevens and Earl to maintain the band through 2005.

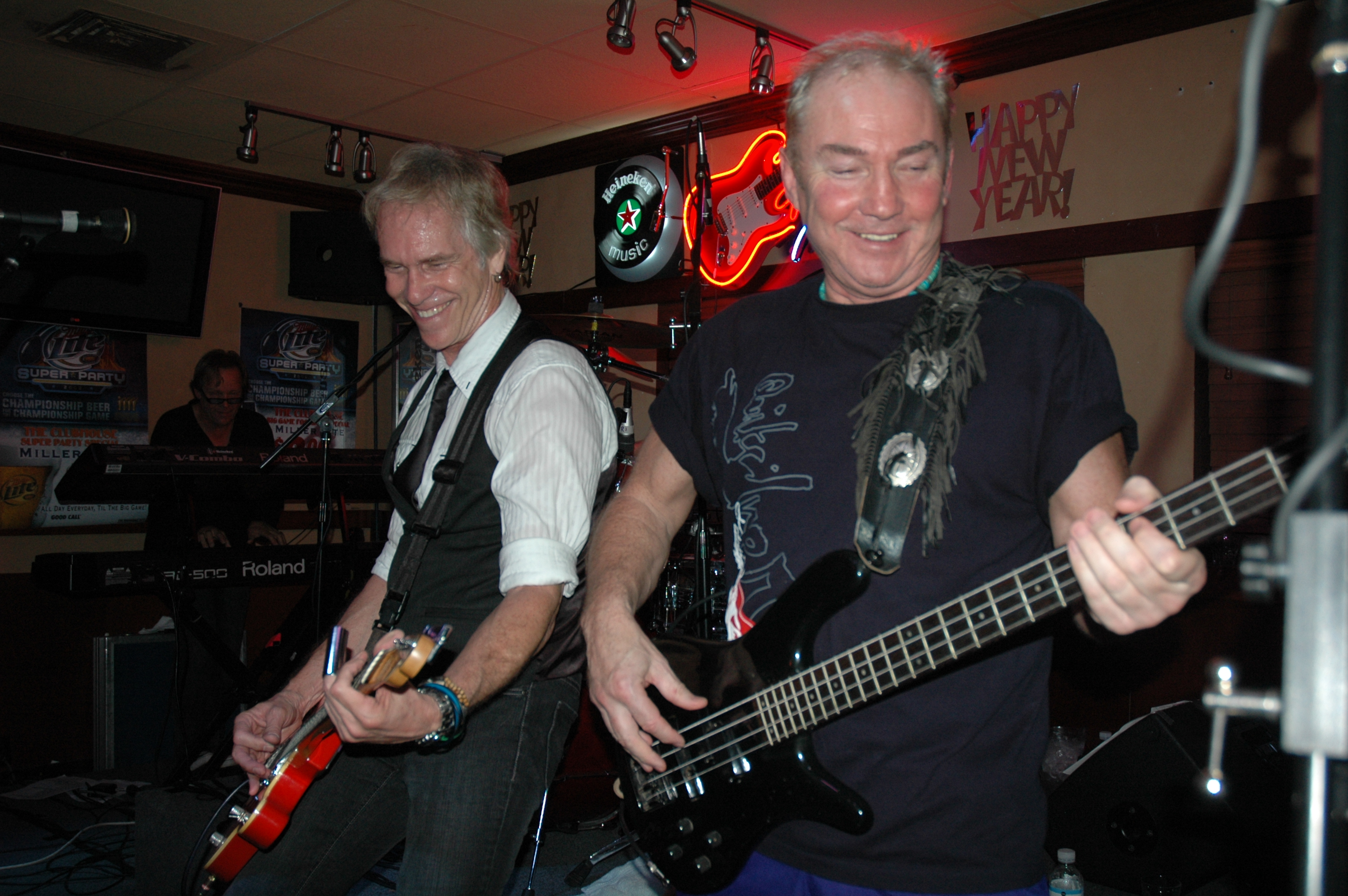
Billy Livesay and Stevens performing in Hollywood, Florida in January 2008

Stevens currently performs with the band Slow Ride, which he founded in "the Foghat tradition" in 2005. The band takes its name from one of Foghat's most famous songs - although it was first recorded in 1975, after Stevens left the band.

== Discography ==
=== With Savoy Brown ===
- Blue Matter (1969)
- A Step Further (1969)
- Raw Sienna (1970)
- Looking In (1970)

=== With Foghat ===
- Foghat (1972)
- Foghat (1973)
- Energized (1974)
- Rock & Roll Outlaws (1974)
- Return of the Boogie Men (1994)
- Road Cases (1998)
- Family Joules (2003)

=== Solo ===
- Don't Blame Me. . . (2006)

=== Sessions ===
- Original TV Soundtrack, Rock Follies (1976)
- Original TV Soundtrack, Rock Follies of '77 (1977)
- Andy Mackay, Resolving Contradictions (1978)
