= Bryan Bassett =

American guitarist

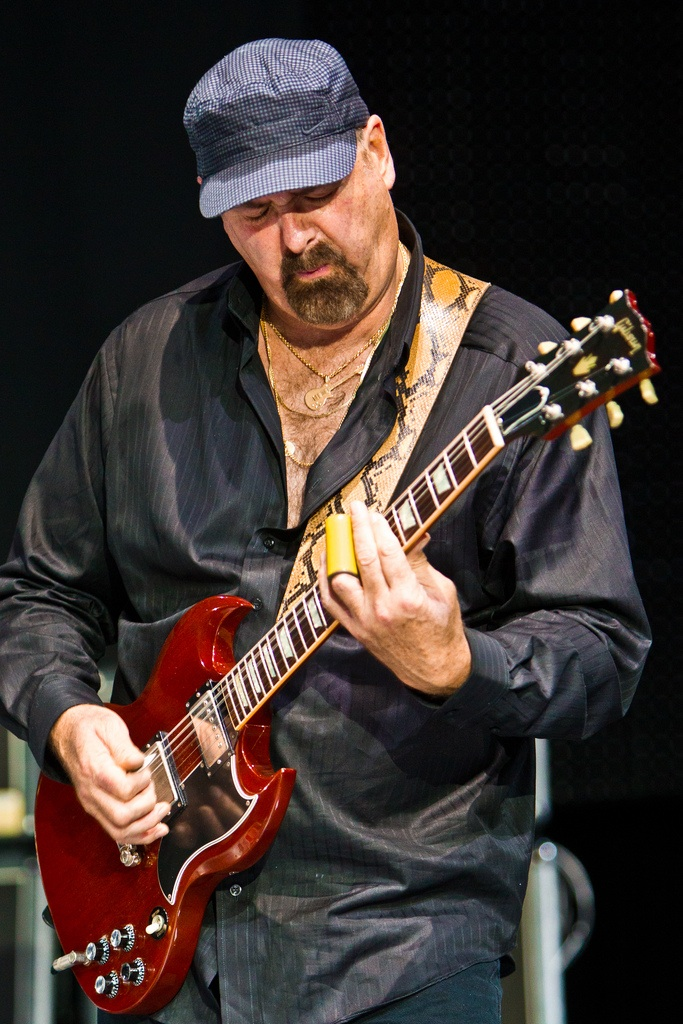
- Bassett performing in 2013

Background information
- Born: August 11, 1954 (age 72); Pittsburgh, Pennsylvania, U.S.
- Genres: Rock; funk; hard rock; blues rock
- Occupation: Musician
- Instrument: Guitar
- Years active: 1975–present

Bryan Bassett (born August 11, 1954) is an American guitarist who has played with several notable bands, but is best known as a member of Wild Cherry in the 1970s who had a hit with "Play That Funky Music".

== Early career ==
Bryan was born on August 11, 1954, in Pittsburgh, Pennsylvania. He began playing with some local Pittsburgh bands in the late 1960s and early 1970s before joining Wild Cherry in 1975 which was actually a reformation of a popular local Ohio band led by vocalist/guitarist Rob Parissi. They recorded the hit "Play That Funky Music" that same year. Bassett plays the recognizable guitar figure that introduces the song. Bassett continued on with Wild Cherry until their breakup in 1979, and they charted a few more hits. He went on to a successful career as a music producer in the 1980s.

Bassett began teaching the Contemporary Ensemble class at Daytona State College in 2010.

== Molly Hatchet and Foghat ==
In 1989 Bassett formed a friendship with Foghat's "Lonesome" Dave Peverett. He joined his band, which was billed as Lonesome Dave's Foghat, and served as an alternate version of Foghat, touring separately from Foghat, which was led by drummer Roger Earl. He played with Lonesome Dave's Foghat until 1993 when Foghat's original lineup reformed. It was at this time that Bryan joined Molly Hatchet and toured with them until 1999. This version of Molly Hatchet had original vocalist Danny Joe Brown with the band until 1995, but he left, and they toured with no original members.

While Bryan was in Molly Hatchet, Foghat's original lineup began to fall apart once again as guitarist Rod Price left the group in 1999. Bryan joined the band to take his place. Dave Peverett died the following year of cancer and was replaced by Charlie Huhn. Bassett still performs with Foghat to this day.
