= Roger Earl =

English drummer

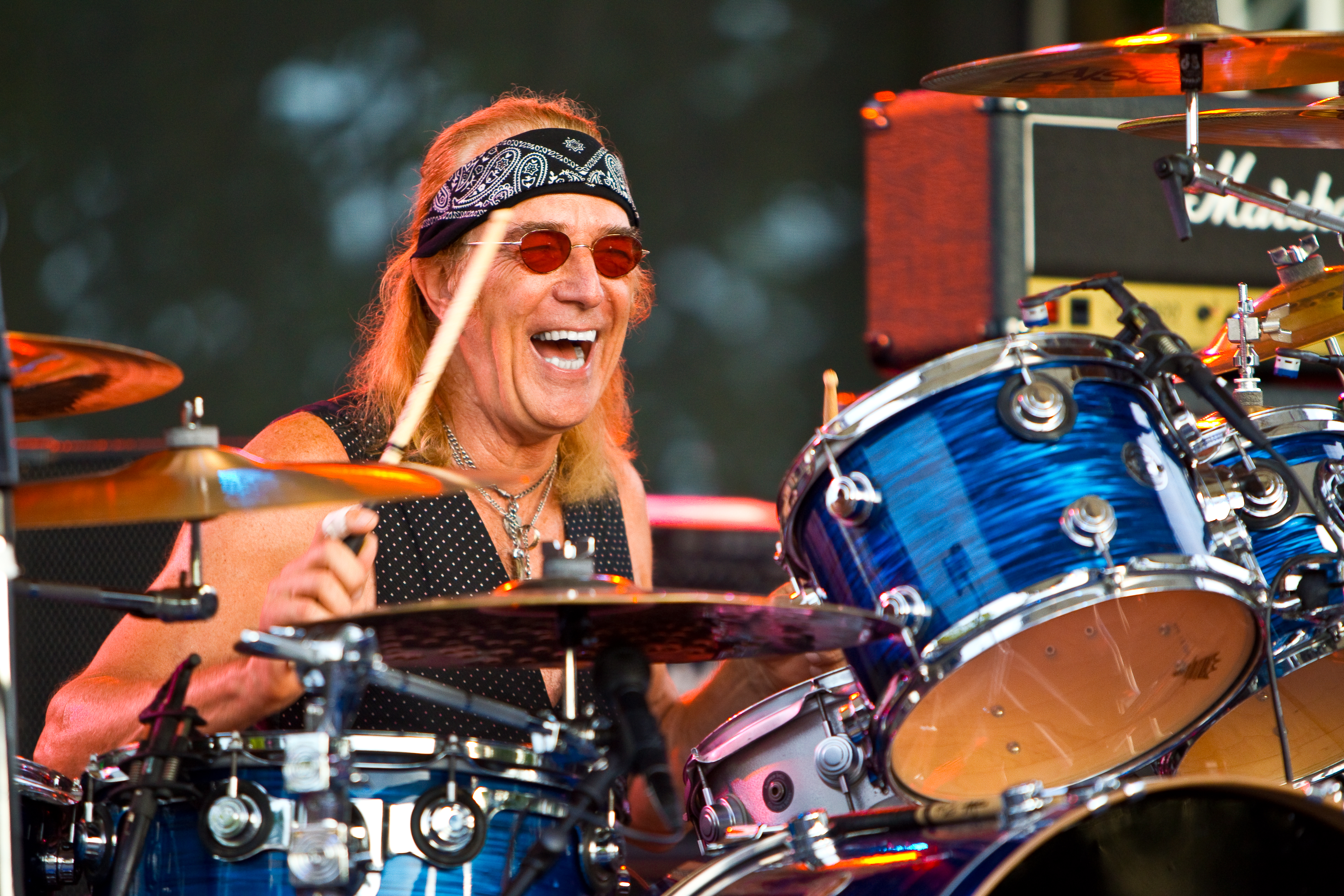
- Earl in Enfield, Connecticut - July 2010

Background information
- Born: 16 May 1946 (age 80); Hampton Court Palace, London, England
- Genres: Blues rock, blues, rock
- Occupations: Musician, songwriter
- Instruments: Drums, percussion
- Years active: 1966–present
- Labels: Decca, Deram, Bearsville

Roger Earl (born 16 May 1946) is an English drummer best known as a member of the rock band Foghat. A founding member, along with guitarist and vocalist "Lonesome" Dave Peverett, guitarist Rod Price, and bassist Tony Stevens, Earl is the only member to feature in every lineup of the band.

== Career ==
Earl was inspired to be a musician after seeing Jerry Lee Lewis in concert in London at age 12 or 13.Before founding Foghat, Earl was a member of Savoy Brown from 1968 to 1970 and unsuccessfully auditioned for the Jimi Hendrix Experience.

Earl also played on Chris Jagger's second, self-titled, album released in 1973, and appears on one track on Mungo Jerry's 1971 album Electronically Tested.

Earl continues to tour with Foghat, playing around 70 dates a year, specializing in city-fests, biker conventions, the "stay where you play" casino circuit and classic rock cruises.

Earl lives with his wife Linda on the North Shore, Long Island, west of Port Jefferson, New York.

His brother, Colin Earl, played electric piano for Mungo Jerry and has done some studio recording with Foghat, most recently on Foghat's album Last Train Home.

== In popular culture ==
Carl Brutananadilewski, a character in the TV series Aqua Teen Hunger Force, expressed in a commercial that he is a fan of Roger Earl, saying "That's my drummer. The guy from Foghat," later adding "I don't know his name, but he's really good."
