= List of Molly Hatchet members =

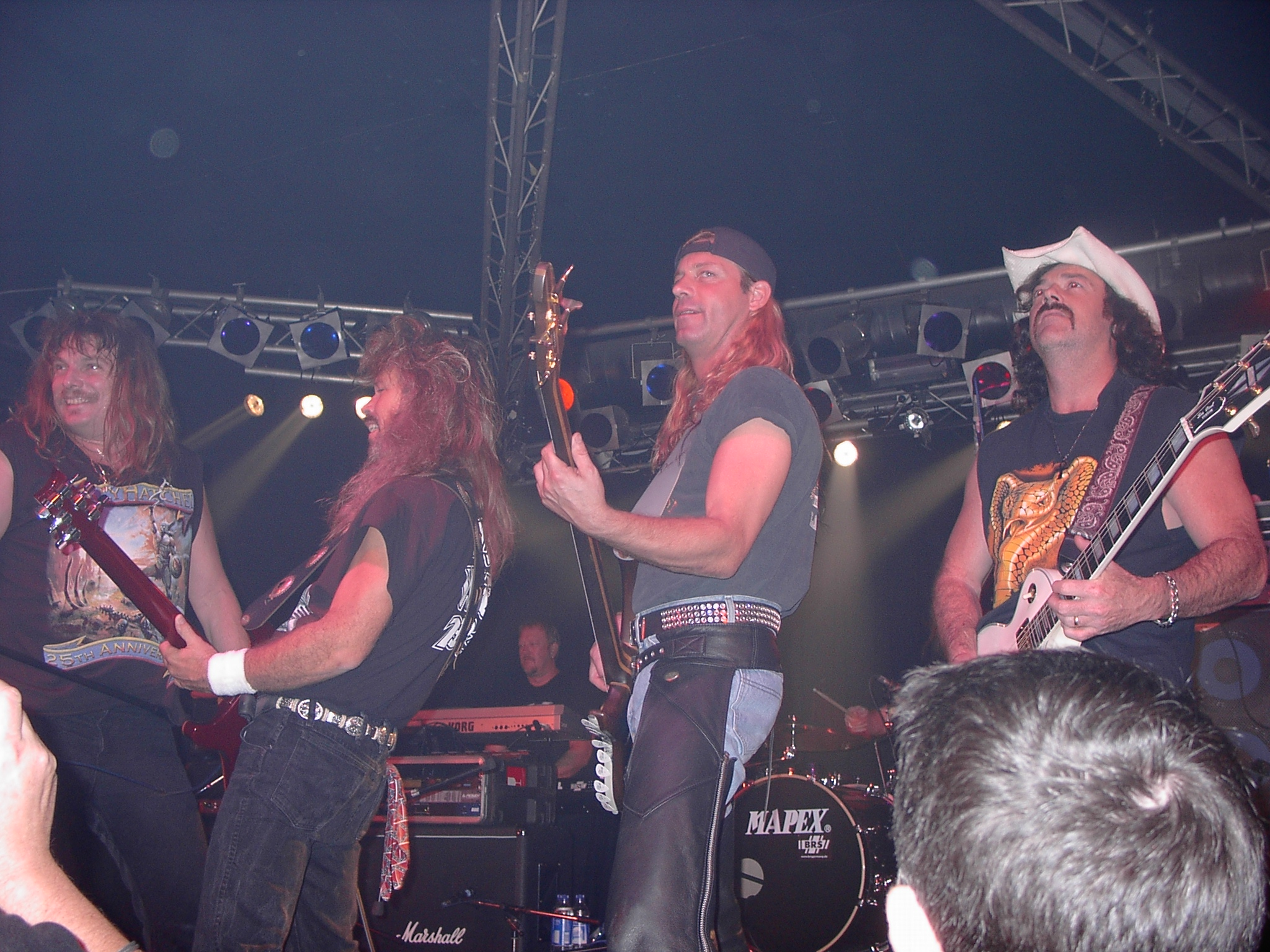
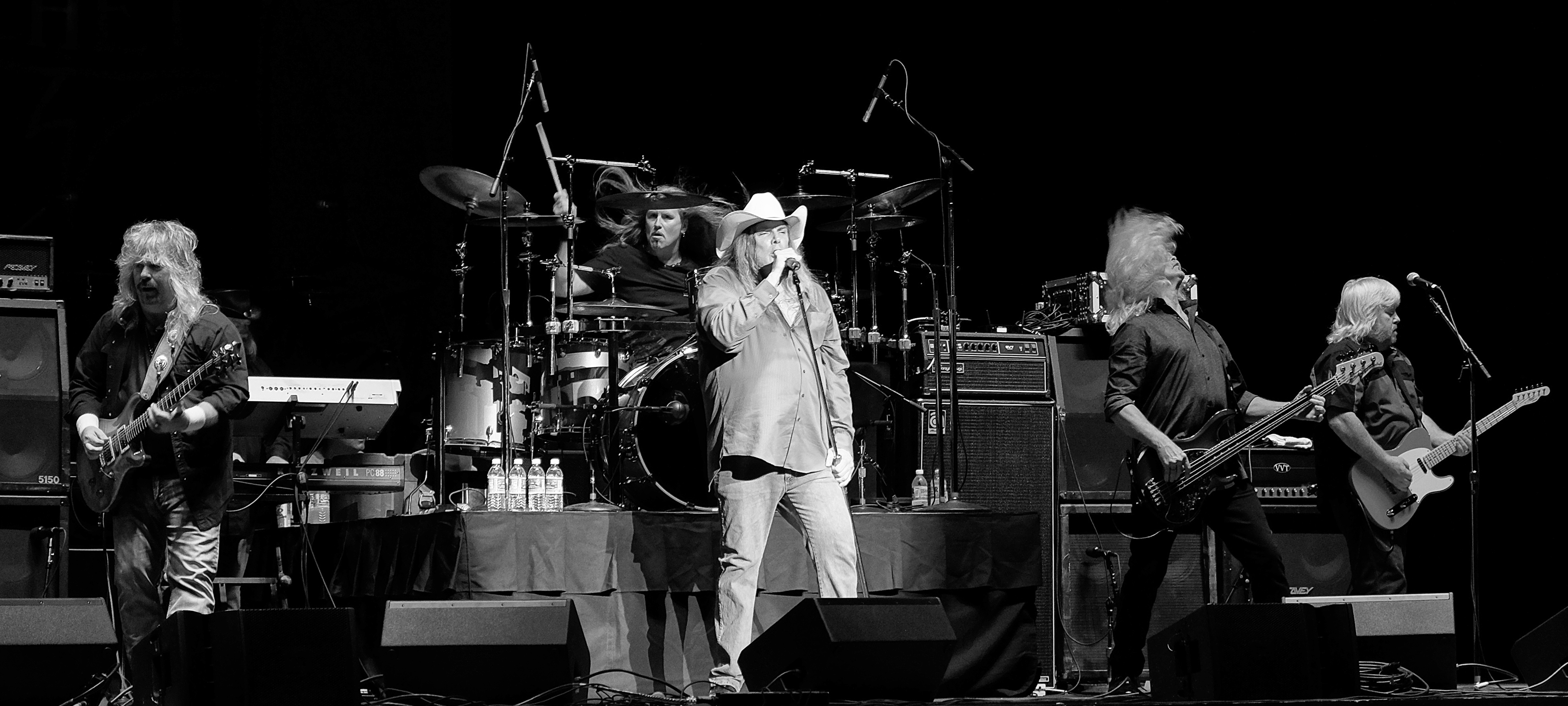
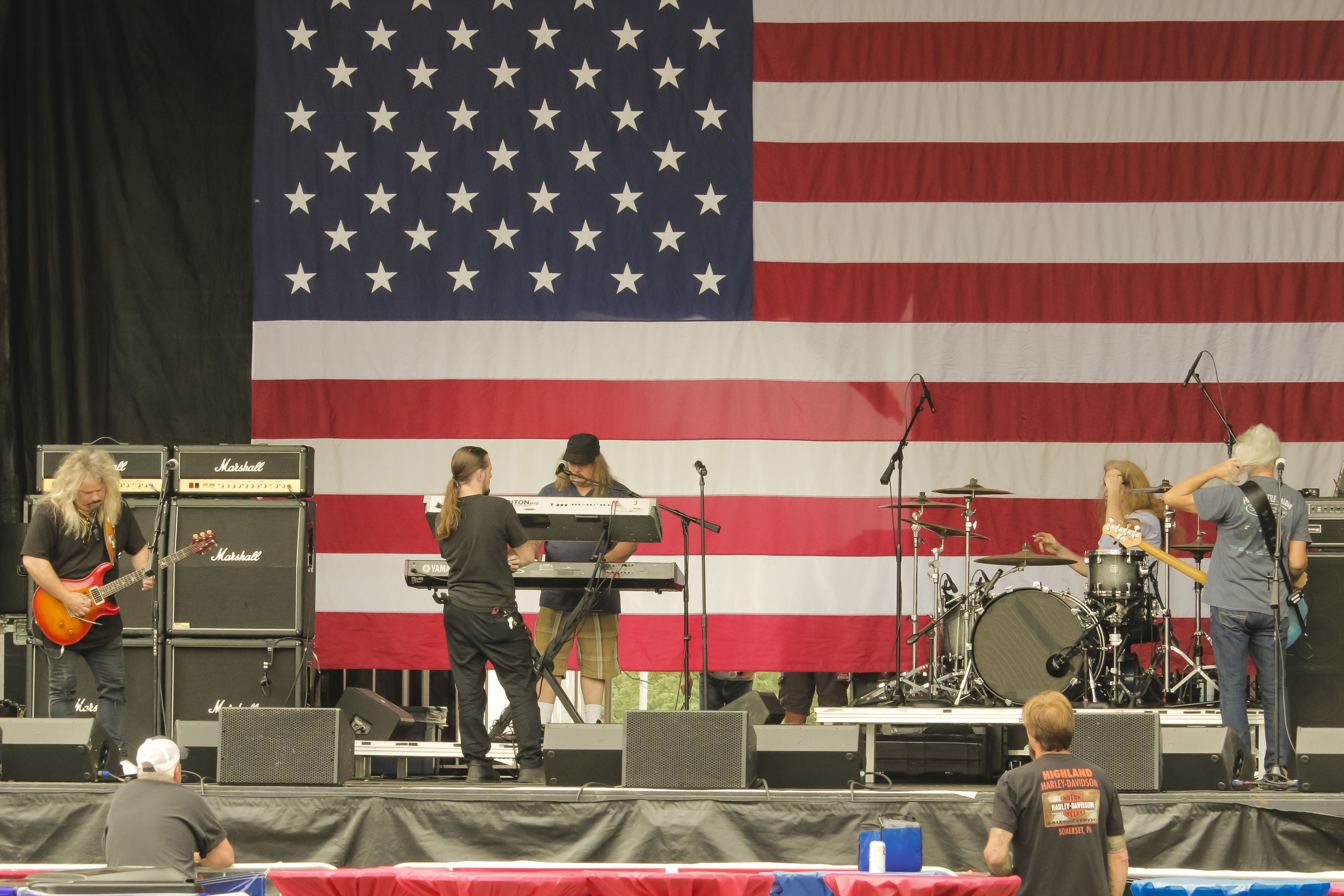
Three lineups of Molly Hatchet in 2003, 2014 and 2017.

Molly Hatchet is an American Southern rock band from Jacksonville, Florida. Originally formed in 1971 by guitarist Dave Hlubek, the group's early years were characterized by regular personnel changes and sporadic performances, with no stable lineup in place. By 1976, the band Molly Hatchet had been officially reformed with a lineup of Hlubek, Steve Holland and Duane Roland on guitars, Danny Joe Brown on vocals, Banner Thomas on bass and Bruce Crump on drums. As from 2020, all original members have died. The current lineup of Molly Hatchet includes three veteran musicians: guitarist Bobby Ingram (since 1987 and owner of the moniker Molly Hatchet), keyboardist John Galvin (who originally joined in 1983) and bassist Tim Lindsey (since 2003, but in the early 1970s with Hlubek in Mind Garden and in the first proto-Hatchet lineup). Young members Parker Lee (vocals since 2023) and Garrett Ramsden (drummer since 2024) complete the ranks.

== History ==
=== 1971–1995 ===
Molly Hatchet was originally founded by guitarist Dave Hlubek in 1971. During its early years, the band performed with various monikers and musicians in the Jacksonville area, not settling on an official lineup. Early members that surrounded Hlubek included between others guitarist Steve Holland, vocalist Bobby Maddox, guitarist Donald Hall, keyboardist Melvin Powell, bassist Tim Lindsey and drummer Fred Bianco. Hlubek also performed vocals during certain periods of the band's formation. By the spring of 1976, the group had settled on a lineup including Hlubek and Holland, bassist Banner Thomas (who joined in 1973), drummer Bruce Crump (who joined in early 1976), third guitarist Duane Roland and vocalist Danny Joe Brown (both of whom joined in 1976). Brown joined from Rum Creek, which featured future Danny Joe Brown Band and Molly Hatchet guitarist Bobby Ingram.

After the release of Molly Hatchet and Flirtin' with Disaster, Brown left Molly Hatchet in 1980 due to problems with diabetes, with Jimmy Farrar taking his place. Beatin' the Odds and Take No Prisoners followed, after which Thomas also left in November 1981 following an argument with Hlubek. He was replaced by Ralph "Riff" West. The following year, Crump moved to Los Angeles, California and was replaced by Barry "B.B." Borden. In May, Brown returned to replace Farrar and the group released No Guts... No Glory in 1983. By 1984, Crump had returned and keyboardist John Galvin – a former member of the Danny Joe Brown Band who contributed keyboard parts to No Guts... No Glory as a guest performer – had joined the band full-time, after Holland grew tired of touring and left the band.

The new two-guitarist lineup released The Deed Is Done in 1984, followed by Double Trouble Live in 1985, before Hlubek left the band at the beginning of 1987 in order to address his ongoing problem with drug addiction. He was replaced by Bobby Ingram, another alumnus of the Danny Joe Brown Band. After releasing and touring in promotion of Lightning Strikes Twice, Molly Hatchet played its last show in July 1990 before the group disbanded. At the time Duane Roland left as last in 1990, he was the owner of the Molly Hatchet name. The agreement in the band had always been that the last man standing got the brand.

=== 1995–2017 ===
Brown and Ingram obtained the name from Roland and management and subsequently rebuilt the group later in the year, touring for another five years with various personnel. In April 1995, Danny Joe Brown was forced to leave Molly Hatchet again due to ongoing health problems. He was replaced by Phil McCormack, who had earlier substituted for Brown during a tour in 1992. The group's new lineup – which also included guitarist Bryan Bassett, bassist Andy McKinney, drummer Mac Crawford and former keyboardist John Galvin – returned to the studio and released Devil's Canyon in 1996. This was followed in 1998 by Silent Reign of Heroes, which also featured contributions from keyboardist Tim Donovan, who had filled in for Galvin during several recent touring cycles. Sean Shannon replaced Crawford in 1999. With the live addition of guitarist Mike Owings in the tour that followed, that was the last line-up of Molly Hatchet to feature three guitars.

After the release of Kingdom of XII in 2000, guitarist Bryan Bassett was replaced by Russ Maxwell. The band recorded the double live album Locked and Loaded before the end of the year, although it was not released until 2003. Further lineup changes followed during the band's touring the following year, as Shannon was replaced in September 2001 by Dale Rock, who then made way for Shawn Beamer the next month. McKinney also left in February 2002 and was replaced by Jerry Scott, shortly before Ingram took a short break from touring after suffering a heart attack, and the band continued with only Maxwell on guitar. Scott was then replaced by Tim Lindsey (a veteran of the scene, with long time friend Dave Hlubek in Mind Garden and in the first unofficial Hatchet lineup, with Rossington Band, with Lynyrd Skynyrd live) . Maxwell left the next month, with Jake Rutter taking his place.

In January 2005 founding member Dave Hlubek returned to Molly Hatchet for the first time in 18 years.The guitarist's touring appearances were limited due to his ongoing health issues. During the 2000s and 2010s, many former members of the band died – vocalist Danny Joe Brown on March 10, 2005, due to kidney failure and pneumonia caused by his diabetes, guitarist Duane Roland on June 19, 2006, due to natural causes, bassist Riff West on November 19, 2014, due to health complications caused by a car accident several months earlier, drummer Bruce Crump on March 16, 2015, after a lengthy battle with throat cancer, and bassist Banner Thomas on April 10, 2017, due to a heart attack following a bout of pneumonia.

=== Recent activity (2017-onwards) ===
On September 2, 2017, guitarist Dave Hlubek died of a heart attack. The group continued to perform with just one guitarist, as Ingram stated that he "could never" replace Hlubek. On October 29, 2018, former vocalist Jimmy Farrar died due to complications from congestive heart failure, kidney failure and liver failure. Molly Hatchet continued to tour until Phil McCormack died on April 25, 2019. Jimmy Elkins took his place and was officially announced as the band's new vocalist in October 2019. Steve Holland, the last original member of the group, died on August 2, 2020.

Despite having no original members left, Molly Hatchet continues to perform extensively both in the US and Europe: their current lineup features half of the Lightning Strikes Twice–era lineup (veterans guitarist Bobby Ingram and keyboardist John Galvin) plus longtime bassist Tim Lindsey. Young vocalist Parker Lee replaced Jimmy Elkins earlier in 2023., while veteran drummer Shawn Beamer stopped touring in 2024, being gradually replaced by Garrett Ramsden.

== Members ==
=== Current ===
Image	Name	Years active	Instruments	Release contributions
	John Galvin	1984–1990; 1995–present	keyboards; synthesizers; piano; programming; backing vocals	all Molly Hatchet releases from No Guts... No Glory (1983) onwards (except retrospective live releases)
	Bobby Ingram	1987–present	lead, rhythm, acoustic, slide guitars; backing vocals	all Molly Hatchet releases from Lightning Strikes Twice (1989) onwards (except retrospective live releases)
	Tim Lindsey	2004—present	bass; backing vocals	all Molly Hatchet releases from Warriors of the Rainbow Bridge (2005) onwards (except Live at Rockpalast 1996)
	Parker Lee	2023–present	lead vocals	"Firing Line" (2023)
	Garrett Ramsden	2024–present	drums; percussion	none

=== Former members and recording personnel ===
Image	Name	Years active	Instruments	Release contributions
	Dave Hlubek	1971–1987; 2005–2017 (until his death)	lead, rhythm and slide guitars; backing and occasional lead vocals	all Molly Hatchet releases from Molly Hatchet (1978) to Double Trouble Live (1985); Live at the Agora Ballroom, Atlanta, Georgia April 20, 1979 (2000); Extended Versions (2002); all Molly Hatchet releases from Warriors of the Rainbow Bridge (2005) to Regrinding the Axes (2012)
	Steve Holland	1971–1984 (died 2020)	lead and rhythm guitars	all Molly Hatchet releases from Molly Hatchet (1978) to No Guts... No Glory (1983); Live at the Agora Ballroom, Atlanta, Georgia April 20, 1979 (2000); Extended Versions (2002)
	Banner Thomas	1974–1981; 1993–1994 (died 2017)	bass; backing vocals	all Molly Hatchet releases from Molly Hatchet (1978) to Take No Prisoners (1981); Live at the Agora Ballroom, Atlanta, Georgia April 20, 1979 (2000); Extended Versions (2002)
	Bruce Crump	1976–1982; 1984–1990 (died 2015)	drums; percussion; backing vocals	all Molly Hatchet releases from Molly Hatchet (1978) to Greatest Hits (1990) – two previously unreleased tracks, except No Guts... No Glory (1983); Live at the Agora Ballroom, Atlanta, Georgia April 20, 1979 (2000); Extended Versions (2002)
	Duane Roland	1976–1990 (died 2006)	lead, rhythm, acoustic, slide guitars; backing vocals	all Molly Hatchet releases from Molly Hatchet (1978) to Greatest Hits (1990) – two previously unreleased tracks; Live at the Agora Ballroom, Atlanta, Georgia April 20, 1979 (2000); Extended Versions (2002)
	Danny Joe Brown	1976–1980; 1982–1995 (one-off in 1998) (died 2005)	lead vocals; harmonica	Molly Hatchet (1978); Flirtin' with Disaster (1979); all Molly Hatchet releases from No Guts... No Glory (1983) to Greatest Hits (1990) – two previously unreleased tracks; Live at the Agora Ballroom, Atlanta, Georgia April 20, 1979 (2000)
	Jimmy Farrar	1980–1982; 1995 (died 2018)	lead vocals	Beatin' the Odds (1980); Take No Prisoners (1981); Extended Versions (2002)
	Ralph "Riff" West	1981–1990 (died 2014)	bass; backing vocals	all Molly Hatchet releases from No Guts... No Glory (1983) to Greatest Hits (1990) – two previously unreleased tracks
	Barry "B.B." Borden	1982–1984	drums	No Guts... No Glory (1983)
	Rob Sweat	1990–1991 (died 2025)	bass	none
	Kevin "Sav" Rian	1991	bass	none
	Phil McCormack	1992; 1995–2019 (until his death)	lead vocals; harmonica	all Molly Hatchet releases from Devil's Canyon (1996) to Live at Rockpalast 1996 (2013) (except retrospective live releases)
	Bryan Bassett	1994–2000	lead, rhythm and acoustic guitars; backing vocals	Devil's Canyon (1996); Silent Reign of Heroes (1998); Kingdom of XII (2000); Live at Rockpalast 1996 (2013)
	Mac Crawford	1993–1999	drums; percussion; backing vocals	Devil's Canyon (1996); Silent Reign of Heroes (1998); Live at Rockpalast 1996 (2013)
	Andy McKinney	1995–2000 (died 2025)	bass; backing vocals	Devil's Canyon (1996); Silent Reign of Heroes (1998); Kingdom of XII (2000); Live at Rockpalast 1996 (2013)
	Sean Shannon	1999–2001	drums	Kingdom Of XII (2000)
	Russ Maxwell	2000–2004 (session/touring 2000)	lead and rhythm guitars	Kingdom of XII (2000) (session/touring); Locked and Loaded (2003); 25th Anniversary: Best of Re-Recorded (2004)
	Shawn Beamer	2001–2024	drums; percussion	all Molly Hatchet releases from 25th Anniversary: Best of Re-Recorded (2004) to Firing Line (2023) (except Live at Rockpalast 1996)
	Jerry Scott	2002–2003	bass; backing vocals	Locked and Loaded (2003)
	J.J. Strickland	2003–2004	bass	25th Anniversary: Best of Re-Recorded (2004)
	Jake Rutter	2004	lead and rhythm guitars	Live in Hamburg (2005 DVD+CD)
	Jimmy Elkins	2019–2023	lead vocals	Battleground (2019)

=== Session and Touring musicians ===
Image	Name	Years active	Instruments	Details
	Jai Winding	1978–1984 (session)	keyboards	Winding performed keyboards on the band's first five studio albums, prior to the arrival of John Galvin.
	Ricky Medlocke	1983 (touring substitute)	vocals	Lynyrd Skynyrd and Blackfoot musician filled in exceptionally for Brown after his sudden departure together with Holland and Roland in 1983.
	Charlie Hargrett	1983 (touring substitute)	guitars	Also Blackfoot guitarist filled in for one and only performance after the sudden departure of Holland, Roland and Brown in 1983.
	Rik Blanz	1990–1993	lead and rhythm guitars	
	Rob Scavetto	1990–1992	keyboards	
	David Feagle	1990–1991	drums	
	Kenny Holton	1990–1991	drums	
	Erik Lundgren	1993–1994	lead and rhythm guitars	
	Mike Kach	1993–1994	keyboards	
	Andy Orth	1994–1995	keyboards	
	Buzzy Meekins	1995 (died 2015)	bass	
	Leslie Hawkins	1996 (touring)	backing vocals	Hawkins and McCoy appear on the record Live At Rockpalast 1996 as female backing vocalists
	Therisa McCoy	1996 (touring)	backing vocals	Hawkins and McCoy appear on the record Live At Rockpalast 1996 as female backing vocalists
	Tim Donovan	1997–2002 (session/touring)	keyboards; programming	Donovan regularly filled in for Galvin on tour, and guested on Silent Reign of Heroes and Kingdom of XII.
	Mike Owings	1999-2000 (session/touring)	lead and rhythm guitars	Owings was additional live member for the restored "three guitar attack" at the end of the Nineties.
	Dale Rock	2001 (touring substitute)	drums	Rock briefly took over from Sean Shannon on drums.
	Scott Woods	2002–2003 (touring)	keyboards; programming	Woods carried the torch from Donovan on keyboards duties until 2003
	Jeff Ravenscraft	2003–2004 (touring)	keyboards; programming	Ravenscraft took over from Woods as touring keyboardist in September 2003, remaining until early 2004.
	Gary Corbett	2004 (touring) (died 2021)	keyboards; programming	Corbett replaced Ravenscraft in 2004 and left around the same time as guitarist Jake Rutter in September.
	Richie "DelFalvo" Del Favero	2004–2005 (session/touring)	keyboards; piano	Del Favero took over from Corbett in September 2004 and guested on Warriors of the Rainbow Bridge.
	Jimbo Manion	2005 (touring substitute)	lead and rhythm guitars	Jimbo Manion was an additional guitarist in 2005, following the impossibility to tour of Dave Hlubek.
	David "Dino" Ramsey	2006 (touring substitute)	vocals	David "Dino" Ramsey briefly filled in for singer McCormack who was sick to perform live in 2006.
	Scott Craig	2011–2013 (touring substitute)	drums	Craig substituted for Shawn Beamer between 2011 and 2013 after the regular drummer suffered a heart attack.
	Tony Mikus	2022 (touring substitute)	vocals	Mikus, from Big Engine, filled in for Jimmy Elkins in 2022.
	Greg Talley	2024 (touring substitutes)	drums	Talley filled in for Beamer in 2024 US gigs.
	Morgan Evans	2024 (touring substitutes)	drums	Evans also filled in for Beamer in the 2024-2025 gigs.

== Lineups ==
Period	Members	Releases
Spring 1976 – May 1980	Danny Joe Brown – lead vocals, harmonica; Dave Hlubek – guitars, backing vocals; Duane Roland – guitars, backing vocals; Steve Holland – guitars; Banner Thomas – bass, backing vocals; Bruce Crump – drums, percussion, backing vocals	Molly Hatchet (1978); Flirtin' with Disaster (1979); Live at the Agora Ballroom (2000)
May 1980 – November 1981	Jimmy Farrar – lead vocals; Dave Hlubek – guitars, backing vocals; Duane Roland – guitars, backing vocals; Steve Holland – guitars; Banner Thomas – bass, backing vocals; Bruce Crump – drums, percussion, backing vocals	Beatin' the Odds (1980); Take No Prisoners (1981); Extended Versions (2002)
November 1981 – May 1982	Jimmy Farrar – lead vocals; Dave Hlubek – guitars, backing vocals; Duane Roland – guitars, backing vocals; Steve Holland – guitars; Riff West – bass, backing vocals; Bruce Crump – drums, percussion, backing vocals	none
May 1982 – 1984	Danny Joe Brown – lead vocals, harmonica; Dave Hlubek – guitars, backing vocals; Duane Roland – guitars, backing vocals; Steve Holland – guitars; Riff West – bass, backing vocals; B.B. Borden – drums	No Guts... No Glory
1984 – late 1987	Danny Joe Brown – lead vocals, harmonica; Dave Hlubek – guitars, backing vocals; Duane Roland – guitars, backing vocals; Riff West – bass, backing vocals; Bruce Crump – drums, percussion, backing vocals; John Galvin – keyboards, piano, backing vocals	The Deed Is Done (1984); Double Trouble Live (1985)
Late 1987 – July 1990	Danny Joe Brown – lead vocals, harmonica; Duane Roland – guitars, backing vocals; Bobby Ingram – guitars, backing vocals; Riff West – bass, backing vocals; Bruce Crump – drums, percussion, backing vocals; John Galvin – keyboards, piano, backing vocals	Lightning Strikes Twice (1989); Greatest Hits (1990) – two new tracks
Late 1990 – 1991	Danny Joe Brown – lead vocals, harmonica; Bobby Ingram – guitars, backing vocals; Rik Blanz – guitars; Eddie Rio – bass; David Feagle – drums; Rob Scavetto – keyboards	none
1991	Danny Joe Brown – lead vocals, harmonica; Bobby Ingram – guitars, backing vocals; Rik Blanz – guitars; Rob Sweat – bass; David Feagle – drums; Rob Scavetto – keyboards	none
1991–1993	Danny Joe Brown – lead vocals, harmonica; Bobby Ingram – guitars, backing vocals; Rik Blanz – guitars; Kevin Rian – bass; Kenny Holton – drums; Rob Scavetto – keyboards	none
1993–1994	Danny Joe Brown – lead vocals, harmonica; Bobby Ingram – guitars, backing vocals; Erik Lundgren – guitars; Banner Thomas – bass, backing vocals; Mac Crawford – drums, percussion, backing vocals; Mike Kach – keyboards	none
1994	Danny Joe Brown – lead vocals, harmonica; Bobby Ingram – guitars, backing vocals; Bryan Bassett – guitars, backing vocals; Banner Thomas – bass, backing vocals; Mac Crawford – drums, percussion, backing vocals; Andy Orth – keyboards	none
1994–1995	Danny Joe Brown – lead vocals, harmonica; Bobby Ingram – guitars, backing vocals; Bryan Bassett – guitars, backing vocals; Buzzy Meekins – bass; Mac Crawford – drums, percussion, backing vocals; Andy Orth – keyboards	none
1995	Danny Joe Brown – lead vocals, harmonica; Bobby Ingram – guitars, backing vocals; Bryan Bassett – guitars, backing vocals; Andy McKinney – bass, backing vocals; Mac Crawford – drums, percussion, backing vocals; John Galvin – keyboards, piano, backing vocals	none
April 1995 – early 1999	Phil McCormack – lead vocals, harmonica; Bobby Ingram – guitars, backing vocals; Bryan Bassett – guitars, backing vocals; Andy McKinney – bass, backing vocals; Mac Crawford – drums, percussion, backing vocals; John Galvin – keyboards, piano, backing vocals	Devil's Canyon (1996); Silent Reign of Heroes (1998); Live at Rockpalast 1996 (2013)
June 1999– late 2000	Phil McCormack – lead vocals, harmonica; Bobby Ingram – guitars, backing vocals; Bryan Bassett – guitars, backing vocals; Andy McKinney – bass, backing vocals; Sean Shannon – drums, percussion; John Galvin – keyboards, piano, backing vocals	Kingdom of XII (2000)
Late 2000 – October 2001	Phil McCormack – lead vocals, harmonica; Bobby Ingram – guitars, backing vocals; Russ Maxwell – guitars; Jerry Scott – bass, backing vocals; Shawn Beamer – drums, percussion (inactive September–October 2001); John Galvin – keyboards, piano, backing vocals	Locked and Loaded (2003)
October 2001 – May 2003	Phil McCormack – lead vocals, harmonica; Bobby Ingram – guitars, backing vocals; Russ Maxwell – guitars; Jerry Scott – bass, backing vocals; Shawn Beamer – drums, percussion; John Galvin – keyboards, piano, backing vocals	none
May 2003 – February 2004	Phil McCormack – lead vocals, harmonica; Bobby Ingram – guitars, backing vocals; Russ Maxwell – guitars; J.J. Strickland – bass, backing vocals; Shawn Beamer – drums, percussion; John Galvin – keyboards, piano, backing vocals	Best of Re-Recorded (2004)
February – March 2004	Phil McCormack – lead vocals, harmonica; Bobby Ingram – guitars, backing vocals; Russ Maxwell – guitars; Tim Lindsey – bass, backing vocals; Shawn Beamer – drums, percussion; John Galvin – keyboards, piano, backing vocals	none
March – September 2004	Phil McCormack – lead vocals, harmonica; Bobby Ingram – guitars, backing vocals; Jake Rutter – guitars; Tim Lindsey – bass, backing vocals; Shawn Beamer – drums, percussion; John Galvin – keyboards, piano, backing vocals	Live in Hamburg (2005)
September 2004 – January 2005	Phil McCormack – lead vocals, harmonica; Bobby Ingram – guitars, backing vocals; Tim Lindsey – bass, backing vocals; Shawn Beamer – drums, percussion; John Galvin – keyboards, piano, backing vocals	none
January 2005 – September 2017	Phil McCormack – lead vocals, harmonica; Bobby Ingram – guitars, backing vocals; Dave Hlubek – guitars, backing vocals; Tim Lindsey – bass, backing vocals; Shawn Beamer – drums, percussion; John Galvin – keyboards, piano, backing vocals	Warriors of the Rainbow Bridge (2005); Flirtin' with Disaster Live (2007); Southern Rock Masters (2008); Justice (2010); Regrinding the Axes (2012)
September 2017 – April 2019	Phil McCormack – lead vocals, harmonica; Bobby Ingram – guitars, backing vocals; Tim Lindsey – bass, backing vocals; Shawn Beamer – drums, percussion; John Galvin – keyboards, piano, backing vocals	none
April 2019 – April 2023	Jimmy Elkins – lead vocals; Bobby Ingram – guitars, backing vocals; Tim Lindsey – bass, backing vocals; Shawn Beamer – drums, percussion; John Galvin – keyboards, piano, backing vocals	Battleground (2019)
April 2023 – May 2024	Parker Lee – lead vocals; Bobby Ingram – guitars, backing vocals; Tim Lindsey – bass, backing vocals; Shawn Beamer – drums, percussion; John Galvin – keyboards, piano, backing vocals	"Firing Line" (2023)
