= Greatest Hits (Molly Hatchet album) =

Compilation album by Molly Hatchet
- Released: November 1990
- Genres: Southern rock, hard rock
- Length: 59:03, 71:30 (re-issue)
- Labels: Epic, Sony Music (re-issue)
- Producers: Tom Werman, Pat Armstrong, Andy De Ganahl, Terry Manning, Jeff Magid (re-issue)

Molly Hatchet chronology
Lightning Strikes Twice (1989)	Greatest Hits (1990)	Devil's Canyon (1996)

Professional ratings
Review scores
Source	Rating
AllMusic	4.5/5 stars
Collector's Guide to Heavy Metal	6/10

Greatest Hits is a compilation of songs by the American southern rock band Molly Hatchet. The collection was released in 1990. It was their last album released by Epic Records and features guitarist Bobby Ingram on the two newly recorded tracks after the departure of Dave Hlubek in 1987. The album also does not include anything from their latest album at the time Lightning Strikes Twice, which was released in 1989 on Capitol Records. In 2001 Sony Music re-issued the album in an expanded edition with three tracks that were not on the original 12-track collection, along with liner notes from Martin Popoff.

== Track listing (original issue) ==
1. "Shake the House Down" (Riff West, Duane Roland, Danny Joe Brown, Bruce Crump, Bobby Ingram, John Galvin) - 4:12 (previously unreleased)
2. "Ragtop Deluxe" (West, Roland, Brown, Crump, Ingram, Galvin) - 3:18 (previously unreleased)
3. "Whiskey Man" (Steve Holland, Dave Hlubek, Brown, Crump) - 3:38 (from the album Flirtin' with Disaster)
4. "Bounty Hunter" (Brown, Hlubek, Roland) - 2:57 (from the album Molly Hatchet)
5. "Gator Country" (Banner Thomas, Holland, Hlubek) - 6:17 (from the album Molly Hatchet)
6. "Flirtin' with Disaster" (Thomas, Brown, Hlubek) - 4:56 (from the album Flirtin' with Disaster)
7. "Bloody Reunion" (live) (Thomas, Jimmy Farrar, Hlubek, Roland) - 3:59 (from the live album Double Trouble Live)
8. "Boogie No More" (Hlubek, Roland, Brown, Thomas, Holland, Crump) - 6:05 (from the album Flirtin' with Disaster)
9. "Dreams I'll Never See" (Gregg Allman) - 7:06 (from the album Molly Hatchet)
10. "Beatin' the Odds" (live) (Thomas, Roland, Hlubek) - 4:16 (from the live album Double Trouble Live)
11. "Edge of Sundown" (live) (Kenny McVay, David Bush, Brown) - 4:16 (from the live album Double Trouble Live)
12. "Fall of the Peacemakers" (Hlubek) - 8:03 (from the album No Guts...No Glory)

== Track listing (expanded issue) ==
1. "Whiskey Man" - 3:40
2. "Bounty Hunter" - 3:00
3. "Gator Country" - 6:18
4. "Flirtin' with Disaster" - 4:59
5. "Bloody Reunion" (live) - 4:08
6. "Boogie No More" - 6:08
7. "Dreams I'll Never See" - 7:28
8. "Beatin' the Odds" (live) - 3:38
9. "Edge of Sundown" (live) - 4:31
10. "Fall of the Peacemakers" - 8:07
11. "It's All Over Now" (Bobby Womack, Shirley Jean Womack) - 3:42 (from the album Flirtin' with Disaster)
12. "The Creeper" (Brown, Crump, Holland) - 3:19 (from the album Molly Hatchet)
13. "Satisfied Man" (Thomas DeLuca, Tom Jans) - 4:59 (from the album The Deed Is Done)
14. "Ragtop Deluxe" - 3:19
15. "Shake the House Down" - 4:14

== Certifications ==
Region	Certification	Certified units/sales
United States (RIAA)	Gold	500,000^{^}
^{^} Shipments figures based on certification alone.
