= Double Trouble Live =

Live album by Molly Hatchet
- Released: November 1985
- Recorded: Jacksonville, Florida and Dallas, Texas
- Genres: Southern rock, hard rock
- Length: 79:14
- Label: Epic
- Producers: Pat Armstrong, Andy de Ganahl

Molly Hatchet chronology
The Deed Is Done (1984)	Double Trouble Live (1985)	Lightning Strikes Twice (1989)

Professional ratings
Review scores
Source	Rating
AllMusic	3/5 stars
Collector's Guide to Heavy Metal	7/10
Sounds	5/5 stars

Double Trouble Live is a double LP live album by American rock group Molly Hatchet, released in 1985. Two previously unreleased songs, "Walk on the Side of the Angels" and "Walk with You" were omitted in the CD edition to fit all the music on a single compact disc. The cover of "Freebird" and "Edge of Sundown" were songs usually performed by lead singer Danny Joe Brown and The Danny Joe Brown Band during his period of absence from Molly Hatchet.

== Track listing ==
Side one

1. "Whiskey Man" (Danny Joe Brown, Bruce Crump, Dave Hlubek, Steve Holland) - 3:47
2. "Bounty Hunter" (Brown, Hlubek, Duane Roland) - 3:00
3. "Gator Country" (Hlubek, Holland, Banner Thomas) - 7:16
4. "Flirtin' with Disaster" (Brown, Hlubek, Thomas) - 5:30

Side two

5. "Stone in Your Heart" (Roland Brooks, Thomas DeLuca, Harold Tipton) - 4:13
6. "Satisfied Man" (DeLuca, Tom Jans) - 4:43
7. "Bloody Reunion" (Jimmy Farrar, Hlubek, Roland, Thomas) - 4:04
8. "Boogie No More" (Brown, Crump, Hlubek, Holland, Roland, Thomas) - 7:36

Side three

1. "Freebird" (Allen Collins, Ronnie Van Zant) - 11:19 (Lynyrd Skynyrd cover)
2. "Walk on the Side of the Angels" (Marc Blatte, Larry Gottlieb) - 3:56
3. "Walk with You" (John Hall) - 4:26 (John Hall cover)

Side four

4. "Dreams I'll Never See" (Gregg Allman) - 7:02 (The Allman Brothers Band cover)
5. "Edge of Sundown" (Brown, David Bush, Kenny McVay) - 4:24 (The Danny Joe Brown Band cover)
6. "Fall of the Peacemakers" (Hlubek) - 7:11
7. "Beatin' the Odds" (Hlubek, Roland, Thomas) - 3:41

== Personnel ==
Molly Hatchet

- Danny Joe Brown - lead vocals, guitar, harmonica
- Dave Hlubek - guitar, slide guitar, backing vocals
- Duane Roland - guitar
- John Galvin - keyboards, backing vocals
- Riff West - bass, backing vocals
- Bruce Crump - drums

Additional musicians

- Dru Lombar - guitar on "Walk on the Side of the Angels"
- Keith Holmes - saxophone on "Walk with You"

Production

- Pat Armstrong - producer
- Andy de Ganahl - producer, live recording in Jacksonville, mixing assistant
- Johnny Rosen - live recording in Dallas and Jacksonville
- Greg McNeilly - assistant engineer in Jacksonville
- Ed Thacker - mixing at Parc Studios, Orlando, Florida
- George Marino - mastering at Sterling Sound, New York

== Charts ==
Chart (1985–86)	Peak position
UK Albums (Official Charts)	94
US Billboard 200	130
