= Regrinding the Axes =

Studio album by Molly Hatchet
- Released: June 12, 2012
- Studio: Visionsound, Orange Park, Florida
- Genre: Southern rock
- Length: 79:09
- Label: Mausoleum
- Producer: Bobby Ingram

Molly Hatchet chronology
Justice (2010)	Regrinding the Axes (2012)

Regrinding the Axes is the fourteenth studio album by American rock band Molly Hatchet, released on June 12, 2012, by Mausoleum Records. It has a similar track listing to their 2008 release Southern Rock Masters with a different order of the songs and some substitutions. "Free Bird" (Lynyrd Skynyrd), "Back in the USSR" (the Beatles), and "Yesterday" (the Beatles) have been inserted instead of "Desperado" (the Eagles). The three original live bonus tracks have been replaced with "Get in the Game" (from their 2005 album Warriors of the Rainbow Bridge), the instrumental part of "Layla" (Derek & the Dominos by Eric Clapton), and a live version of "Dreams I'll Never See" (Allman Brothers Band).

== Track listing ==
No.	Title	Writer(s)	Length
1.	"Bad to the Bone" (George Thorogood and the Destroyers cover)	George Thorogood	3:59
2.	"Mississippi Queen" (Mountain cover)	Leslie West, Corky Laing, Felix Pappalardi, David Rea	2:36
3.	"Free Bird" (Lynyrd Skynyrd cover)	Allen Collins, Ronnie Van Zant	10:43
4.	"Back in the U.S.S.R." (the Beatles cover)	John Lennon, Paul McCartney	2:41
5.	"Sharp Dressed Man" (ZZ Top cover)	Billy Gibbons, Dusty Hill, Frank Beard	4:43
6.	"The Boys Are Back in Town" (Thin Lizzy cover)	Phil Lynott	4:57
7.	"Tumbling Dice" (the Rolling Stones cover)	Mick Jagger, Keith Richards	3:06
8.	"Dreams I'll Never See" (the Allman Brothers Band cover)	Gregg Allman	7:49
9.	"Melissa" (the Allman Brothers Band cover)	Gregg Allman, Stephen Alaimo	4:41
10.	"Wild Horses" (the Rolling Stones cover)	Mick Jagger, Keith Richards	5:34
11.	"Tequila Sunrise" (Eagles cover)	Don Henley, Glenn Frey	2:58
12.	"Yesterday" (the Beatles cover)	John Lennon, Paul McCartney	2:12

Bonus live tracks
No.	Title	Writer(s)	Length
13.	"Get in the Game"	Bobby Ingram, Phil McCormack	5:01
14.	"Layla (Guitar Solo)" (Derek & the Dominos cover)	Eric Clapton, Jim Gordon	10:10
15.	"Dreams I'll Never See" (the Allman Brothers Band cover)	Gregg Allman	7:50

== Personnel ==
=== Band members ===
- Phil McCormack – lead and backing vocals
- Bobby Ingram – guitars, acoustic guitar, slide guitar, backing vocals, producer, mixing
- Dave Hlubek – guitars
- John Galvin – keyboards, backing vocals
- Tim Lindsey – bass, backing vocals
- Shawn Beamer – drums, percussion

=== Additional musicians ===
- Charlie Daniels – lead vocals on "Free Bird"

=== Production ===
- Paul Lapinski – engineer, mixing, mastering
- Scott Fravala, Daryl Pheeneger – engineers
