= Take No Prisoners (Molly Hatchet album) =

- Cover art by Boris Vallejo

Studio album by Molly Hatchet
- Released: November 1981
- Recorded: 1981
- Studio: Compass Point Studios, Nassau, Bahamas; Record Plant Studios, Los Angeles, California
- Genre: Southern rock, hard rock
- Length: 35:20
- Label: Epic
- Producer: Tom Werman

Molly Hatchet chronology
Beatin' the Odds (1980)	Take No Prisoners (1981)	No Guts...No Glory (1983)

Singles from Take No Prisoners
- 1. "Power Play" / "Bloody Reunion" Released: 1981

Professional ratings
Review scores
Source	Rating
AllMusic	2.5/5 stars
Collector's Guide to Heavy Metal	6/10
The Rolling Stone Album Guide	2/5 stars

Take No Prisoners is the fourth studio album by American southern rock band Molly Hatchet, released in 1981. This is the second and last studio album released with lead singer Jimmy Farrar; the last one with original bass player Banner Thomas; and the last to feature drummer Bruce Crump until The Deed Is Done. "Respect Me in the Morning" is a duet between Farrar and Joyce "Baby Jean" Kennedy of Mother's Finest. The album is also notable because actress Katey Sagal appears as a backup singer.

== Track listing ==
Side one
No.	Title	Writer(s)	Length
1.	"Bloody Reunion"	Jimmy Farrar, Dave Hlubek, Duane Roland, Banner Thomas	4:00
2.	"Respect Me in the Morning"	Farrar, Roland	3:22
3.	"Long Tall Sally" (Little Richard cover)	Robert Blackwell, Enotris Johnson, Richard Penniman	2:56
4.	"Loss of Control"	Bruce Crump, Roland, Thomas	3:31
5.	"All Mine"	Thomas	4:00

Side two
No.	Title	Writer(s)	Length
6.	"Lady Luck"	Hlubek	3:36
7.	"Power Play"	Steve Holland	3:50
8.	"Don't Mess Around"	Roland, Thomas	3:01
9.	"Don't Leave Me Lonely"	Crump, Holland	3:59
10.	"Dead Giveaway"	Hlubek	3:28

== Personnel ==
Molly Hatchet

- Jimmy Farrar - vocals
- Dave Hlubek - guitar, slide guitar
- Steve Holland - guitar
- Duane Roland - guitar, slide guitar
- Banner Thomas - bass
- Bruce Crump - drums

Additional musicians

- Jai Winding - keyboard
- Paulinho da Costa - congas
- Tom Werman - percussion
- Tower of Power horn section - horns on "Bloody Reunion" and "Lady Luck"
- Mindy Sterling, Laurie Bono, Katey Sagal - backing vocals
- Joyce 'Baby Jean' Kennedy - additional vocals on "Respect Me in the Morning"

Production

- Tom Werman - producer
- Gary Ladinsky - engineer, mixing
- Cary Pritkin - assistant engineer
- George Marino - mastering at Sterling Sound, New York

== Charts ==
Chart (1981)	Peak position
US Billboard 200	36
