= Southern Rock Masters =

Studio album by Molly Hatchet
- Released: April 15, 2008
- Recorded: Visionsound Studios, Orange Park, Florida
- Genre: Southern rock
- Length: 57:39
- Label: Deadline/Cleopatra
- Producer: Bobby Ingram

Molly Hatchet chronology
Warriors of the Rainbow Bridge (2005)	Southern Rock Masters (2008)	Justice (2010)

Professional ratings
Review scores
Source	Rating
AllMusic	1.5/5 stars

Southern Rock Masters is a cover album (twelfth studio album) by American southern rock band Molly Hatchet, was released on April 15, 2008 (see 2008 in music).

== Track listing ==
No.	Title	Writer(s)	Length
1.	"Sharp Dressed Man" (ZZ Top cover)	Billy Gibbons, Dusty Hill, Frank Beard	4:45
2.	"The Boys Are Back in Town" (Thin Lizzy cover)	Phil Lynott	4:48
3.	"Desperado" (Eagles cover)	Glenn Frey, Don Henley	3:51
4.	"Bad to the Bone" (George Thorogood and the Destroyers cover)	George Thorogood	4:01
5.	"Dreams I'll Never See" (The Allman Brothers Band cover)	Gregg Allman	7:51
6.	"Melissa" (The Allman Brothers Band cover)	Gregg Allman, Steve Alaimo	4:43
7.	"Mississippi Queen" (Mountain cover)	Leslie West, Corky Laing, Felix Pappalardi, David Rea	2:37
8.	"Tequila Sunrise" (Eagles cover)	Frey, Henley	3:00
9.	"Tumbling Dice" (The Rolling Stones cover)	Mick Jagger, Keith Richards	3:07
10.	"Wild Horses" (The Rolling Stones cover)	Jagger, Richards	5:36

Bonus live tracks
No.	Title	Writer(s)	Length
11.	"Whiskey Man"	Danny Joe Brown, Bruce Crump, Dave Hlubek, Steve Holland	3:44
12.	"Beatin' the Odds"	Banner Thomas, Hlubek, Duane Roland	3:42
13.	"Flirtin' with Disaster"	Brown, Hlubek, Thomas	5:54

iTunes bonus tracks
No.	Title	Writer(s)	Length
14.	"Free Bird (featuring Charlie Daniels)" (Lynyrd Skynyrd cover)	Allen Collins, Ronnie Van Zant	10:43
15.	"Flirtin' with Disaster"	Brown, Hlubek, Thomas	5:16

== Personnel ==
Molly Hatchet

- Phil McCormack – lead and backing vocals
- Bobby Ingram – guitars, acoustic guitar, slide guitar, backing vocals, producer, mixing
- Dave Hlubek – guitars
- John Galvin – keyboards, backing vocals
- Tim Lindsey – bass, backing vocals
- Shawn Beamer – drums, percussion

Additional musicians

- Charlie Daniels – lead vocals on "Free Bird"

Production

- Paul Lapinski – engineer, mixing, mastering
- Scott Fravala, Daryl Pheeneger – engineers
