= Beatin' the Odds (Molly Hatchet album) =

- Cover art by Frank Frazetta

Studio album by Molly Hatchet
- Released: September 1980
- Studios: Bee Jay Recording Studios, Orlando, Florida; Record Plant Studios, Los Angeles, California
- Genres: Southern rock, hard rock
- Length: 32:35
- Label: Epic
- Producers: Tom Werman, Pat Armstrong

Molly Hatchet chronology
Flirtin' with Disaster (1979)	Beatin' the Odds (1980)	Take No Prisoners (1981)

Singles from Beatin' the Odds
- 1. "Beatin' the Odds" / "Few and Far Between" Released: 1980; 2. "The Rambler" / "Get Her Back" Released: 1980

Professional ratings
Review scores
Source	Rating
AllMusic	2/5 stars
Collector's Guide to Heavy Metal	7/10

Beatin' the Odds is the third studio album by American rock band Molly Hatchet, released in 1980 by Epic Records. The album is the first to feature singer Jimmy Farrar, who replaced original singer Danny Joe Brown. A remastered edition of the album was issued in 2008 by Rock Candy Records, with four live bonus tracks and extensive liner notes. The remastering was directed by British producer Jon Astley. The album was also reissued under the SPV/Steamhammer label in 2013 and only included the original tracks.

The cover art for the album was "Conan the Conqueror" by Frank Frazetta.

== Track listing ==
Side one
No.	Title	Writer(s)	Length
1.	"Beatin' the Odds"	Dave Hlubek, Duane Roland, Banner Thomas	3:18
2.	"Double Talker"	Hlubek, Roland	3:15
3.	"The Rambler"	Jimmy Farrar, Hlubek	4:50
4.	"Sailor"	Thomas	3:50

Side two
No.	Title	Writer(s)	Length
5.	"Dead and Gone"	Farrar, Thomas	4:22
6.	"Few and Far Between"	Bruce Crump, Steve Holland	3:40
7.	"Penthouse Pauper" (Creedence Clearwater Revival cover)	John Fogerty	3:18
8.	"Get Her Back"	Roland	3:03
9.	"Poison Pen"	Hlubek, Holland	3:06

=== 2008 re-issue bonus tracks ===
No.	Title	Length
10.	"Beatin' the Odds"	3:38
11.	"Few and Far Between"	3:41
12.	"Penthouse Pauper"	4:07
13.	"Dead and Gone"	4:34

- Tracks 10 - 13 recorded live at The Lakeland Civic Centre, Lakeland, Florida, on 31 December 1980

== Personnel ==
=== Molly Hatchet ===
- Jimmy Farrar - vocals
- Dave Hlubek - guitar, slide guitar
- Steve Holland - guitar
- Duane Roland - guitar, slide guitar
- Banner Thomas - bass
- Bruce Crump - drums

=== Additional personnel ===
- Jai Winding - keyboard

=== Production ===
- Tom Werman - producer
- Gary Ladinsky - engineer, mixing
- Bill Vermillion, Gary Pritikin - assistant engineers
- George Marino - mastering at Sterling Sound, New York
- Pat Armstrong - executive producer, director
- Frank Frazetta - cover painting

== Charts ==
Chart (1980)	Peak position
Canada Top Albums/CDs (RPM)	90
US Billboard 200	25

== Certifications ==
Region	Certification	Certified units/sales
United States (RIAA)	Platinum	1,000,000^{^}
^{^} Shipments figures based on certification alone.
