= Molly Hatchet (album) =

- Cover art by Frank Frazetta

Studio album by Molly Hatchet
- Released: September 1, 1978
- Studios: The Sound Pit, Atlanta, Georgia
- Genres: Southern rock; hard rock
- Length: 37:15
- Label: Epic
- Producers: Tom Werman; Pat Armstrong

Molly Hatchet chronology
Molly Hatchet (1978)	Flirtin' with Disaster (1979)

Singles from Molly Hatchet
- 1. "Dreams I'll Never See" / "The Creeper" Released: 1978

Professional ratings
Review scores
Source	Rating
AllMusic	4.5/5 stars
Collector's Guide to Heavy Metal	7/10

Molly Hatchet is the debut studio album by American rock band Molly Hatchet. It was released on September 1, 1978, by Epic Records. The cover is a painting by Frank Frazetta entitled Death Dealer. Starting off both the album itself and the recording career of the band, the first song famously begins with lead singer Danny Joe Brown growling "Hell yeah!"

"Dreams I'll Never See" is a cover of The Allman Brothers Band's song "Dreams" from their debut album, via Buddy Miles's reworking of the song from Them Changes (1970).

== Track listing ==
Side one
No.	Title	Writer(s)	Length
1.	"Bounty Hunter"	Danny Joe Brown, Dave Hlubek, Steve Holland	2:58
2.	"Gator Country"	Hlubek, Holland, Banner Thomas	6:17
3.	"Big Apple"	Brown, Hlubek	3:01
4.	"The Creeper"	Brown, Bruce Crump, Holland	3:18
5.	"The Price You Pay"	Cecil Berrier, Brown, Holland, Bob Huckaba	3:04

Side two
No.	Title	Writer(s)	Length
6.	"Dreams I'll Never See"	Gregg Allman	7:06
7.	"I'll Be Running"	Brown, Hlubek, Thomas	3:00
8.	"Cheatin' Woman"	Holland	3:36
9.	"Trust Your Old Friend"	Crump, Duane Roland	3:55

== Personnel ==
Molly Hatchet

- Danny Joe Brown - vocals, harmonica on "The Price You Pay" & "I'll Be Running"
- Dave Hlubek - guitar
- Steve Holland - guitar
- Duane Roland - guitar
- Banner Thomas - bass
- Bruce Crump - drums

Additional musicians

- Tom Werman - percussion
- Jai Winding - keyboards
- Tim Lindsey - additional bass

Production

- Tom Werman - producer, mixing at Record Plant, Los Angeles
- Anthony Reale - sound engineer, The Sound Pit, Atlanta
- Richard Schoff - sound engineer
- Mike Beriger - assistant engineer
- Frank Frazetta - cover painting

== Charts ==
Chart (1978)	Peak position
US Billboard 200	64

== Certifications ==
Region	Certification	Certified units/sales
United States (RIAA)	Platinum	1,000,000^{^}
^{^} Shipments figures based on certification alone.
