= Tatanka =

Tatanka may refer to:

- Tatanka, the word for American bison (male animals) in the Lakota language
- Tatanka Iyotake (1831–1890), better known as Sitting Bull, medicine man and leader of the Hunkpapa Sioux
- Tatanka Means, Native American actor and comedian
- Tatanka (wrestler) (born 1961), ring name of American professional wrestler Chris Chavis
- Tatanka (film), a 2011 drama film
- Tatanka, a traditional Polish drink made with Żubrówka and apple juice
- "Tatanka" a song from Devil's Canyon by Molly Hatchet
- Pedro Tatanka, the vocalist of Portuguese band The Black Mamba
