= The Deed Is Done =

Studio album by Molly Hatchet
- Released: November 1984
- Studios: Bee Jay Recording Studios, Orlando, Florida
- Genres: Hard rock; arena rock
- Length: 41:25
- Label: Epic
- Producer: Terry Manning

Molly Hatchet chronology
| No Guts...No Glory (1983) | The Deed Is Done (1984) | Double Trouble Live (1985) |

Singles from The Deed Is Done
- 1. "Satisfied Man" / "Straight Shooter" Released: 1984; 2. "Stone in Your Heart" / "Man on the Run" Released: 1984

Professional ratings
Review scores
| Source | Rating |
|---|---|
| AllMusic | 2/5 stars |
| Collector's Guide to Heavy Metal | 1/10 |

The Deed Is Done is the sixth studio album by American rock band Molly Hatchet. It was released in 1984 through Epic Records. This is the first Molly Hatchet album with only two guitarists, after Steve Holland had been replaced by ex-Danny Joe Brown Band keyboard player John Galvin and the return of drummer Bruce Crump. It was also the band's last album for 21 years to feature longtime guitarist Dave Hlubek. The sound of the album is quite different from the Southern rock of the band's earlier offerings, completing the transition towards more commercial and FM-friendly hard rock. The Deed Is Done is also Molly Hatchet's last studio album released on Epic Records, and their last one to date to enter the Billboard charts. It was reissued in 2013 under the German label SPV/SteamHammer.

== Track listing ==
Side one
| No. | Title | Writer(s) | Length |
|---|---|---|---|
| 1. | "Satisfied Man" | Thomas DeLuca, Tom Jans | 5:01 |
| 2. | "Backstabber" | Ronald Brooks, DeLuca, Jeff Ross | 4:17 |
| 3. | "She Does She Does" | Danny Joe Brown, Bruce Crump, John Galvin, Dave Hlubek, Duane Roland, Riff West | 6:14 |
| 4. | "Intro Piece" | Galvin | 1:16 |
| 5. | "Stone in Your Heart" | Brooks, DeLuca, Harold Tipton | 4:17 |

Side two
| No. | Title | Writer(s) | Length |
|---|---|---|---|
| 6. | "Man on the Run" | Jack Armstrong, DeLuca, Gary Harrison, Terry Manning, Roland | 4:14 |
| 7. | "Good Smoke and Whiskey" | Brown, Crump, DeLuca, Galvin, Hlubek, Roland, West | 3:37 |
| 8. | "Heartbreak Radio" | Frankie Miller, Troy Seals | 3:31 |
| 9. | "I Ain't Got You" | Calvin Carter | 2:32 |
| 10. | "Straight Shooter" | Brown, Crump, Galvin, Hlubek, Roland, West | 3:54 |
| 11. | "Song for the Children" | Hlubek | 2:33 |

== Personnel ==
Molly Hatchet

- Danny Joe Brown - vocals
- Dave Hlubek - guitar
- Duane Roland - guitar
- John Galvin - keyboards
- Riff West - bass
- Bruce Crump - drums

Additional musicians

- Jimi Jamison, Tom DeLuca, Steve Bassett, Terry Manning - background vocals
- Jim Horn - saxophone

Production

- Terry Manning - producer, engineer, mixing
- Andy de Ganahl, Dana Cornock - assistant engineers
- Bob Ludwig - mastering at Masterdisk, New York
- Ezra Tucker - cover art

== Charts ==
| Chart (1984) | Peak position |
|---|---|
| US Billboard 200 | 120 |
