= Lightning Strikes Twice =

Lightning Strikes Twice may refer to:

- Lightning Strikes Twice (album), 1989 album by Molly Hatchet
- Lightning Strikes Twice (play), a 1944 Australian stage play by Rex Rienits
- Lightning Strikes Twice (1934 film), 1934 American film directed by Ben Holmes
- Lightning Strikes Twice (1951 film), a 1951 film drama
