= Silent Reign of Heroes =

- Cover art by Paul R. Gregory

Studio album by Molly Hatchet
- Released: June 16, 1998
- Studios: Karo Studios, Brackel, Germany
- Genres: Southern rock, Southern metal
- Length: 51:46
- Labels: SPV/CBH (Europe), CMC (US)
- Producers: Bobby Ingram, Rainer Hänsel (Executive)

Molly Hatchet chronology
Devil's Canyon (1996)	Silent Reign of Heroes (1998)	Kingdom of XII (2000)

Professional ratings
Review scores
Source	Rating
AllMusic	2/5 stars
Collector's Guide to Heavy Metal	7/10

Silent Reign of Heroes is the ninth studio album by American southern rock band Molly Hatchet, released on June 16, 1998.

== Track listing ==
1. "Mississippi Moon Dog" (Bobby Ingram, Phil McCormack, Andy McKinney) – 3:47
2. "World of Trouble" (Ingram, McCormack) – 5:34
3. "Silent Reign of Heroes" (Ingram, McCormack) – 8:36
4. "Miss Saturday Night" (Mac Crawford, Ingram, McCormack) – 4:06
5. "Blue Thunder" (Bryan Bassett, Ingram, McCormack) – 4:03
6. "Just Remember (You're the Only One)" (John Galvin, Ingram, McCormack) – 4:35
7. "Junk Yard Dawg" (Ingram, McCormack) – 3:35
8. "Dead and Gone (Redneck Song)" (Ingram, McCormack) – 3:16
9. "Saddle Tramp" (Ingram, McCormack) – 7:18
10. "Fall of the Peacemakers" (Dave Hlubek) – 6:56

== Personnel ==
Molly Hatchet

- Phil McCormack – lead vocals, harmonica
- Bobby Ingram – guitars, acoustic guitar, slide guitar, backing vocals, producer
- Bryan Bassett – guitars, acoustic guitar, backing vocals
- John Galvin – keyboards, programming
- Andy McKinney – bass, backing vocals
- Mac Crawford – drums, percussion, backing vocals

Additional musicians

- Tim Donovan – additional keyboards, digital sampling
- Rolf Köhler, Victoria Miles, Linda Fields, Pam MacBeth – backing vocals

Production

- Kalle Trapp – engineer
- Charlie Bauerfeind – mixing
- Rainer Hänsel – executive producer, mixing

== Charts ==
Chart (1998)	Peak position
German Albums (Offizielle Top 100)	76
