= Get Her Back (disambiguation) =

"Get Her Back" is a 2014 song by Robin Thicke.

Get Her Back may also refer to:

- "Get Her Back", a 1980 song by Molly Hatchet from Beatin' the Odds
- "Get Her Back", a song from the soundtrack of the 2009 film Solomon Kane
- Get Her Back!, a 2011 novella by David Sherman
