= Flirtin' with Disaster (song) =

Single by Molly Hatchet

from the album Flirtin' with Disaster
- Released: 1979
- Recorded: 1979
- Genre: Southern rock; hard rock
- Length: 3:48 (Single Version); 4:56 (Album version)
- Label: Epic
- Songwriters: Danny Joe Brown, Dave Hlubek, Banner Thomas
- Producer: Tom Werman

Molly Hatchet singles chronology
| "It's All Over Now" (1979) | "Flirtin' with Disaster" (1979) | "Beatin' the Odds" (1980) |

"Flirtin' with Disaster" is a song by American Southern rock band Molly Hatchet, released in 1979 by Epic Records. Written by three members of the band, it is their most popular song and remained on the US Billboard Hot 100 for 10 weeks, peaking at number 42 in March 1980. It was released on the band's second studio album, Flirtin' with Disaster and is the only single released from the album.

The song has appeared in the films Suspect Zero, The Dukes of Hazzard, Straw Dogs, and Artie Lange's Beer League, and the video games NASCAR 98, NASCAR 25, and Rock Band. It has also appeared in My Name Is Earl, Supernatural, and King of the Hill. The song is also alluded to in the title of a season-two episode of Danny Phantom.

A re-recorded version appears on the band's 2011 compilation Greatest Hits II.

== Track listing ==
7" single

Side A
| No. | Title | Writer(s) | Length |
|---|---|---|---|
| 1. | "Flirtin' with Disaster" | Danny Joe Brown, Dave Hlubek, Banner Thomas | 3:48 |

Side B
| No. | Title | Writer(s) | Length |
|---|---|---|---|
| 1. | "Gunsmoke" | Duane Roland, Bruce Crump | 3:10 |

American promo single

Side A
| No. | Title | Writer(s) | Length |
|---|---|---|---|
| 1. | "Flirtin' with Disaster" | Brown, Hlubek, Thomas | 3:48 |

Side B
| No. | Title | Writer(s) | Length |
|---|---|---|---|
| 1. | "Flirtin' with Disaster" | Brown, Hlubek, Thomas | 4:56 |

Australian promo single

Side A
| No. | Title | Writer(s) | Length |
|---|---|---|---|
| 1. | "Flirtin' with Disaster" | Brown, Hlubek, Thomas | 4:56 |

Side B
| No. | Title | Writer(s) | Length |
|---|---|---|---|
| 1. | "Let the Good Times Roll" | Brown, Hlubek, Thomas | 2:56 |

== Personnel ==
- Danny Joe Brown – vocals
- Dave Hlubek – guitar
- Steve Holland – guitar
- Duane Roland – guitar
- Banner Thomas – bass
- Bruce Crump – drums
- Jai Winding – organ
