= Southern Rock Allstars =

American musical performance group

The Southern Rock Allstars are a band that got its name from the history/lineage of its former members all of whom were connected with Southern rock. Its current lineup consists of former members of The Rossington Band and sidemen of Lynyrd Skynyrd, Marshall Tucker and Jimmy Farrar.

== History ==
Based in Muscle Shoals, Alabama the group at one time featured Jakson Spires, formerly the original drummer with Blackfoot, and Dave Hlubek, former guitarist and chief songwriter for Southern rock group Molly Hatchet. Spires died at 53 of a brain aneurysm in Florida in 2005 and Hlubek the same year rejoined Molly Hatchet as the only original member of that group. Hlubek was replaced by Duane Roland formerly of Molly Hatchet in 2003. Jimmy Farrar also formerly of Molly Hatchet joined in 2002, and still plays with the band. Jay Johnson, formerly the guitarist and a vocalist for the Rossington Band and Blackfoot, was also in the Allstars from 1999 to 2005, and continues to join them on stage on selected dates. A later member of the band was drummer Mark McConnell, who died in 2012.
