= No Guts...No Glory (Molly Hatchet album) =

Studio album by Molly Hatchet
- Released: March 1983
- Recorded: 1982
- Studio: Bee Jay Recording Studios, Orlando, Florida; Record Plant Studios, Los Angeles, California
- Genre: Southern rock, hard rock
- Length: 41:22
- Label: Epic
- Producer: Tom Werman, Dave Hlubek, Duane Roland

Molly Hatchet chronology
Take No Prisoners (1981)	No Guts...No Glory (1983)	The Deed Is Done (1984)

Singles from No Guts...No Glory
- 1. "Kinda Like Love" / "Sweet Dixie" Released: 1983

No Guts...No Glory is the fifth studio album by American southern rock band Molly Hatchet, released in 1983. Original vocalist Danny Joe Brown returned for this recording, with a new rhythm section composed of bassist Riff West (ex-White Witch) and drummer Barry Borden (ex-Mother's Finest). It is Molly Hatchet's only album not to feature an epic, fantasy themed cover. The cover photo for the album was reportedly shot at Six Gun Territory, a now defunct theme park in Silver Springs, Florida.

The album contains the popular song, "Fall of the Peacemakers", which includes overt references to John Lennon. During the tour to support the album, guitarist Steve Holland left the band to be replaced by keyboard player John Galvin.

"What's It Gonna Take", written by Gary O'Connor, was also recorded by the band Fast Forward and appears on their 1984 album Living in Fiction.

== Reception ==
Professional ratings
Review scores
Source	Rating
AllMusic	3.5/5 stars
Collector's Guide to Heavy Metal	6/10

Mark Mehler of Record summarized the album as "mainly a routine blend of hard-core southern rock ("Sweet Dixie", "Ain't Even Close") and mainstream pop/rock ("What Does it Matter?", "Kinda Like Love"). ... The use of keyboards provides a nice change of pace, but there is really very little here we haven't heard many times before, done a lot better." However, he made special mention of "Fall of the Peacemakers", describing it as "an eight-minute-plus song that purports to lament the murders of John F. Kennedy and John Lennon, but actually is an excuse for an extra six minutes of macho boogie riffing. ... a stale, southern-style rewrite of "Abraham, Martin & John."

In a retrospective review, AllMusic's Michael B. Smith praised Molly Hatchet for the "return to the powerful sound that was so prevalent on its debut effort" and compared it to "the best Lynyrd Skynyrd record" and to a "hard rock vein reminiscent of Mountain or early Grand Funk Railroad". He gave credit for the increased power to the addition of Barry Borden into the lineup and the presence of Dru Lombar. Canadian journalist Martin Popoff noticed how the sound of No Guts...No Glory is "remarkably consistent" with the preceding album, although cleaner and "a little less metal". He praised the "dark epic ballad 'Fall of the Peacemakers'" and scorned "Kinda Like Love", the band's "first pop country rock song."

== Track listing ==
Side one
No.	Title	Writer(s)	Length
1.	"What Does It Matter?"	Danny Joe Brown, Duane Roland, Riff West	3:33
2.	"Ain't Even Close"	Brown, Roland, West	4:35
3.	"Sweet Dixie"	Dave Hlubek, Steve Holland	3:54
4.	"Fall of the Peacemakers"	Hlubek	8:03

Side two
No.	Title	Writer(s)	Length
5.	"What's It Gonna Take?"	Gary O'Connor	3:59
6.	"Kinda Like Love"	Bobby Allison, Mac Elsensohn	4:09
7.	"Under the Gun"	Hlubek, West	3:54
8.	"On the Prowl"	Barry Borden, Brown, Hlubek	4:07
9.	"Both Sides"	Hlubek	5:08

== Personnel ==
Molly Hatchet

- Danny Joe Brown - vocals
- Dave Hlubek - guitar, assistant producer
- Steve Holland - guitar
- Duane Roland - guitar, assistant producer
- Riff West - bass
- Barry "B.B." Borden - drums

Additional musicians

- Dru Lombar - additional guitar on tracks 8 and 9
- Scott Shelly - additional guitar on track 6
- Jai Winding - keyboards
- John Galvin - piano

Production

- Tom Werman - producer
- Gary Ladinsky - engineer, mixing
- Bill Vermillion, Bill Hutchison - assistant engineers
- George Marino - mastering at Sterling Sound, New York

== Charts ==
Chart (1983)	Peak position
US Billboard 200	59
