= Jimmy Farrar =

American songwriter

- Born: December 8, 1950; LaGrange, Georgia, U.S.
- Died: October 29, 2018 (aged 67) LaGrange, Georgia, U.S.
- Genres: Southern rock; blues rock; folk rock
- Occupations: Musician; songwriter
- Instrument: Vocals
- Years active: 1978–2015
- Labels: Epic; Capitol

James Edwin Farrar (December 8, 1950 – October 29, 2018) was a singer, songwriter and musician born in LaGrange, Georgia, and the original lead singer of the Raw Energy band. He was also known as the second lead singer of the American Southern Rock band Molly Hatchet from 1980 to 1982, and in more recent years, Gator Country.

== Life and career ==
=== Early years ===
James Edwin Farrar was born in LaGrange, Georgia on 8 December 1950. His parents were Edwin Herman Farrar and Vesta Eloise Foster. Jimmy Farrar started singing when he was a child, in his hometown of LaGrange, Georgia while listening to songs on the radio. Farrar remembered he had a maid who had a stack of 78 records that he listened to in his early childhood, as early as four years old. B.B. King, John Lee Hooker and other blues and Motown artists were his influences.

In his late teens, Farrar moved to Atlanta where he was in a rock band named Intrepid with his friend Frank Holiday. After that he toured for a couple of years with another band named Catt.

=== Molly Hatchet years 1980–82 ===
In 1978, Farrar went back home to LaGrange to work a regular job for two years, until joining the La Grange band Raw Energy as their lead singer. Raw Energy went on tour six nights a week, 52 songs per night. While in Daytona Beach, Florida in February 1980 the band met Rocky Membrettie, who was a former roadie for Molly Hatchet. Raw Energy put him to work with them as they continued touring, eventually ending up back in LaGrange, Georgia, the home base of the band. Rocky Membrettie suggested Raw Energy make a tape and take it to Macon, Georgia to Pat Armstrong who was handling Molly Hatchet.

When Jimmy Farrar's vocals were heard by Molly Hatchet's producer, he was eyed as a possible replacement for vocalist Danny Joe Brown who left Molly Hatchet in 1980 due to health concerns.

Molly Hatchet rented a club called the Warehouse. They set the entire concert stage up in there. They cranked up, Farrar sang three songs and they hired him on the spot, playing two shows there. Jimmy Farrar's first gig with Molly Hatchet was set to be at the Tangerine Bowl in Orlando, Florida opening for Bob Seger for an audience of 65,000 people, but Danny Joe Brown arrived at the last minute and the band did the show with Brown instead, which was Brown's final show at that time with Molly Hatchet. The next show, on 9 May 1980, in front of 20,000 high school seniors at King's Dominion Amusement Park in Virginia, was Farrar's first with Molly Hatchet.

Along with Jimmy Farrar came a new approach to the band's sound. The earlier albums feature more variation in guitar tone and style and exhibit a distinct southern cultural influence, which seemed to change with the addition of Farrar on vocals. By this time, acts such as Van Halen had made harder heavy metal-influenced rock popular in the 1980s, and may have led to a shift in the band's sound and style. Danny Joe Brown's stage persona, gruff voice and cowboy horse-whistling had matched well with the overtly southern-influenced sounds of his era. Farrar's new vocal style, mixed with a new harder-rocking sound has been seen as the reason for Molly Hatchet's rise in popularity in the early 1980s. The first year Farrar was on tour with Molly Hatchet the band did almost 300 shows. At the end of the tour Molly Hatchet averaged more than six shows a week.

With the success of the next album, the Beatin' the Odds release, the band ventured even farther away from the southern rock sound of their first albums. By 1981, Molly Hatchet had evolved to a straight-ahead rock style and a slicker production, exhibited on the Take No Prisoners release of the same year. The band remained a successful act on the touring circuit. Founding member and bass player Banner Thomas left in 1983 and was replaced by Riff West, while Farrar also left Molly Hatchet in late 1982 for personal reasons, his last show being on 9 May 1982 at Six Flags in Atlanta. He would later rejoin other members of Molly Hatchet in Southern Rock Allstars and Gator Country.

Brown rejoined the band in late 1982 after the departure of Farrar and B. B. Borden.

After leaving Molly Hatchet, Farrar played in a band called Predator for six years. Then he was the lead singer of the band Section 8. In 1999, Farrar joined the Dixie Jam Band at the Jammin for DJB benefit and spent several years as a member of the Southern Rock All-Stars.

=== Gator Country ===
Farrar then joined Gator Country alongside several other former Molly Hatchet members, Jimmy Farrar, Steve Holland, Bruce Crump, Riff West, along with Paul Chapman, a former member of the band U.F.O.

=== 2008 ===
In July 2008, the Gator Country band web site reported that lead singer Jimmy Farrar had suffered a mild stroke. According to the web site: "It is true that Jimmy, our beloved brother and front man, suffered a stroke a couple of weeks ago. He woke up, as he puts it, "Feelin' kind of funky" on his left side. As strokes go, it was a mild one and he is having very minimal effects as a result. The first morning in the hospital they had him up and walking the halls and he's been mobile ever since. The only complaint he has is a little weakness in his left arm. Some physical therapy is expected to help with that."

=== Later years and death ===
Jimmy Farrar lived in his hometown of LaGrange, Georgia, and continued with solo music projects, most recently with the LaGrange, Georgia based band Hanging Tough, along with Kenneth Roberts (rhythm and lead guitars), Frank Holiday (bass), Randy Harper (keyboards), Ronnie Chesser (drums), and Tony Loftis (lead guitar).

Farrar died on October 29, 2018, due to heart failure, at the age of 67.

== Discography ==
- "Oh Atlanta", single with Gator Country

=== Studio albums with Molly Hatchet ===
Year	Album	US	RIAA
1980	Beatin' the Odds	25	Platinum
1981	Take No Prisoners	36	—
"—" denotes the album failed to chart, not released, or not certified
