= Warriors of the Rainbow Bridge =

Studio album by Molly Hatchet
- Released: May 24, 2005
- Recorded: Rockfarm Studio Claus Kramer, Diemelsee, Germany
- Genre: Southern rock
- Length: 58:46
- Label: SPV
- Producer: Bobby Ingram

Molly Hatchet chronology
Kingdom of XII (2000)	Warriors of the Rainbow Bridge (2005)	Southern Rock Masters (2008)

Professional ratings
Review scores
Source	Rating
AllMusic	3.5/5 stars

Warriors of the Rainbow Bridge is the eleventh album by American Southern rock band Molly Hatchet, released on May 24, 2005, two months after former singer Danny Joe Brown died from complications of pneumonia. In January 2005, guitarist Bobby Ingram invited Dave Hlubek, one of the original three guitarists, to rejoin Molly Hatchet and in doing so became the only current member who was a part of the original band, and appears on this album.

== Track listing ==
All tracks are written by Bobby Ingram and Phil McCormack, except where noted.

No.	Title	Writer(s)	Length
1.	"Son of the South"		4:44
2.	"Moonlight Dancin' on the Bayou"		5:08
3.	"I'm Ready for You"		4:24
4.	"Roadhouse Boogie"		3:58
5.	"Time Keeps Slipping Away"	John Galvin, Ingram, McCormack	3:18
6.	"Get in the Game"		5:32
7.	"Flames Are Burning"		6:43
8.	"Hell Has No Fury"		4:32
9.	"Gone in Sixty Seconds"		3:37
10.	"Behind the Bedroom Door"	Galvin, Ingram, McCormack	6:10
11.	"No Stranger to the Darkness"	Shawn Beamer, Galvin, Ingram, Tim Lindsey, McCormack	4:22
12.	"Rainbow Bridge"		6:18
Total length:			58:46

== Personnel ==
Molly Hatchet

- Phil McCormack – lead vocals, harmonica
- Bobby Ingram – guitars, acoustic guitar, backing vocals, producer, editor
- Dave Hlubek – guitars, backing vocals
- John Galvin – keyboards, piano, programming
- Tim Lindsey – bass, backing vocals
- Shawn Beamer – drums, percussion

Additional musicians

- Rich DelFalvo – keyboards, piano

Production

- Nikolo Kotzev – engineer, mixing
- Rainer Hänsel – mixing

== Charts ==
Chart (2005)	Peak position
German Albums (Offizielle Top 100)	57
