= Flirtin' with Disaster =

- Cover art by Frank Frazetta

Studio album by Molly Hatchet
- Released: September 1979
- Studios: Bee Jay, Orlando, Florida; Record Plant, Los Angeles, California
- Genres: Southern rock, boogie rock
- Length: 38:17
- Label: Epic
- Producers: Tom Werman, Pat Armstrong

Molly Hatchet chronology
Molly Hatchet (1978)	Flirtin' with Disaster (1979)	Beatin' the Odds (1980)

Singles from Flirtin' with Disaster
- 1. "Jukin' City" / "Gunsmoke" Released: 1979; 2. "It's All Over Now" / "Good Rockin'" Released: 1979; 3. "Flirtin' with Disaster" / "Gunsmoke" Released: 1979

Flirtin' with Disaster is the second studio album by American rock band Molly Hatchet, released in 1979 by Epic Records. The album was re-issued in 2001 with four bonus tracks. It is their best-selling album.

The cover is a painting by Frank Frazetta titled "Dark Kingdom."

== Critical reception ==
Professional ratings
Review scores
Source	Rating
AllMusic	4/5 stars
Christgau's Record Guide	C+
Collector's Guide to Heavy Metal	7/10
The Rolling Stone Album Guide	2.5/5 stars

The Globe and Mail wrote that "Molly Hatchet is little more than just another in a too-long line of senseless and unimaginative southern boogie bands, rehashing party-boogie licks and singing the joys of cheap booze and even cheaper women."

The Rolling Stone Album Guide deemed the title track "an obvious Skynyrd rip ... [that] possesses a certain rough charm."

== Track listing ==
No.	Title	Writer(s)	Length
1.	"Whiskey Man"	Danny Joe Brown, Bruce Crump, Dave Hlubek, Steve Holland	3:38
2.	"It's All Over Now"	Bobby Womack, Shirley Jean Womack	3:40
3.	"One Man's Pleasure"	Brown, Hlubek, Duane Roland	3:24
4.	"Jukin' City"	Brown, Hlubek, Holland	3:46
5.	"Boogie No More"	Brown, Crump, Hlubek, Holland, Roland, Banner Thomas	6:08
6.	"Flirtin' with Disaster"	Brown, Hlubek, Thomas	5:00
7.	"Good Rockin'"	Brown, Crump, Hlubek, Holland, Roland, Thomas	3:17
8.	"Gunsmoke"	Crump, Roland	3:11
9.	"Long Time"	Brown, Hlubek, Holland	3:19
10.	"Let the Good Times Roll"	Brown, Hlubek, Holland	2:56
Total length:			38:17

2001 bonus tracks
No.	Title	Writer(s)	Length
11.	"Silver and Sorrow" (demo)	Brown, Crump, Hlubek, Holland, Roland, Thomas	3:36
12.	"'Flirtin' with Disaster" (live from Jacksonville, FL in 1980)		3:36
13.	"One Man's Pleasure" (live from Jacksonville, FL in 1980)		3:16
14.	"Cross Road Blues" (live from Jacksonville, FL in 1980)	Robert Johnson	4:13
Total length:			55:51

== Personnel ==
Molly Hatchet

- Danny Joe Brown – vocals
- Dave Hlubek – guitar
- Steve Holland – guitar
- Duane Roland – guitar
- Banner Thomas – bass guitar
- Bruce Crump – drums

Additional musicians

- Max Carl – background vocals on track 2
- Tom Werman – percussion
- Jai Winding – keyboard

Production

- Tom Werman – producer
- Gary Ladinsky – engineer, mixing
- Bill Vermillion, Cary Pritkin – assistant engineers
- George Marino – mastering at Sterling Sound, New York
- Pat Armstrong – executive producer, direction

== Charts ==
=== Weekly charts ===
Chart (1979)	Peak position
Canada Top Albums/CDs (RPM)	54
US Billboard 200	19

=== Year-end charts ===
Chart (1980)	Position
US Billboard 200	24

== Certifications ==
Region	Certification	Certified units/sales
Canada (Music Canada)	Gold	50,000^{^}
United States (RIAA)	2× Platinum	2,000,000^{^}
^{^} Shipments figures based on certification alone.
