= Danny Joe Brown and the Danny Joe Brown Band =

Studio album by The Danny Joe Brown Band
- Released: 1981
- Recorded: Compass Point Studios, Nassau, Bahamas
- Genre: Southern rock
- Length: 38:24
- Label: Epic
- Producer: Glyn Johns

Professional ratings
Review scores
Source	Rating
AllMusic	3/5 stars

Danny Joe Brown and the Danny Joe Brown Band is the only studio album by American Southern rock band The Danny Joe Brown Band, released in 1981. The track "Edge of Sundown" peaked at No. 12 on US Billboard Mainstream Rock chart, on July 4, 1981.

== Track listing ==
Side one
No.	Title	Writer(s)	Length
1.	"Sundance"	Danny Joe Brown, David Bush, Kenneth Allen McVay	4:19
2.	"Nobody Walks on Me"	John Eugene Galvin, Stephen Lawrence Wheeler	3:07
3.	"The Alamo"	Brown, Robert Wayne Ingram, Thomas Hilton Meekins	3:05
4.	"Two Days Home"	Brown, Galvin, McVay	3:14
5.	"Edge of Sundown"	Brown, Bush, McVay	6:32

Side two
No.	Title	Writer(s)	Length
6.	"Beggar Man"	David Feagle, Ingram	3:44
7.	"Run for Your Life"	Ingram	3:40
8.	"Hear My Song"	Meekins, Pat Ramsey	3:13
9.	"Gambler's Dream"	Brown, Bush, McVay	3:32
10.	"Hit the Road"	Brown, McVay	4:08

== Personnel ==
=== The Danny Joe Brown Band ===
- Danny Joe Brown - lead vocals
- Bobby Ingram - guitar, slide guitar, backing vocals
- Kenny McVay - guitar
- Steve Wheeler - guitar, slide guitar
- John Galvin - keyboards, backing vocals
- Buzzy Meekins - bass, backing vocals
- Jimmy Glenn - drums

=== Production ===
- Glyn Johns - producer, engineer
- Sean Fullan - assistant engineer
- George Marino - mastering at Sterling Sound, New York

== Charts ==
Year	Chart	Position
1981	Billboard 200	120
