= Lightning Strikes Twice (album) =

Studio album by Molly Hatchet
- Released: August 30, 1989
- Studios: Parc Studios, Orlando, Florida
- Genres: Southern rock, hard rock, glam metal
- Length: 43:13
- Label: Capitol
- Producers: Pat Armstrong, Andy DeGanahl, Duane Roland

Molly Hatchet chronology
Double Trouble Live (1985)	Lightning Strikes Twice (1989)	Greatest Hits (1990)

Professional ratings
Review scores
Source	Rating
AllMusic	2/5 stars
Collector's Guide to Heavy Metal	4/10

Lightning Strikes Twice is the seventh studio album by American southern rock band Molly Hatchet, released in 1989. This was the band's first album not released on Epic Records, and their first one with guitarist Bobby Ingram, replacing founding member Dave Hlubek. Although the album did not enter the Billboard charts, it included their last charting single to date "There Goes the Neighborhood". Lightning Strikes Twice would also be the band's last album before their temporary breakup in 1990 and the last one to feature vocalist Danny Joe Brown, guitarist Duane Roland, bassist Riff West and drummer Bruce Crump.

== Track listing ==
No.	Title	Writer(s)	Length
1.	"Take Miss Lucy Home"	Ronald Perry, Frank Wildhorn	3:12
2.	"There Goes the Neighborhood"	Tom Miller, Rocky Burnette	3:45
3.	"No Room on the Crew"	William Little, Ed Raetzloff, J.B. Smith	3:27
4.	"Find Somebody New"	Riff West, Danny Joe Brown, Bruce Crump, John Galvin, Bobby Ingram, Duane Roland	3:11
5.	"The Big Payback"	Mike Causey, Rob Walker	4:35
6.	"I Can't Be Watching You"	Galvin, Ingram, Brown, Roland, Crump, West	6:01
7.	"Goodbye to Love"	Galvin, Ingram, Roland, Crump, West, Brown	5:30
8.	"Hide Your Heart" (Bonnie Tyler cover)	Desmond Child, Paul Stanley, Holly Knight	4:38
9.	"What's the Story, Old Glory"	Steve Carlisle, Dave Ivory, Kurt Palomaki, Galvin, West, Roland, Crump, Ingram, Brown	3:21
10.	"Heart of My Soul"	Galvin, Ingram, West, Crump, Brown, Roland	5:33

== Personnel ==
Molly Hatchet

- Danny Joe Brown – vocals, harmonica
- Bobby Ingram – Acoustic, lead, rhythm guitars, backing vocals
- Duane Roland – lead, acoustic, slide and rhythm guitars, backing vocals, assistant producer
- John Galvin – keyboards, synthesizer, backing vocals
- Riff West – bass, backing vocals
- Bruce Crump – drums, backing vocals

Additional musicians

- Amy Martin, Carol Becker Rizzo, Randy Nichols, Sara Moore – backing vocals

Production

- Pat Armstrong – producer, mixing
- Andy DeGanahl – producer, engineer, mixing
- Bill Smith, Jeff Heisey, Mike Chadbourne, Scott Taylor, Wayne Cloughley – assistant engineers
- George Marino – mastering at Sterling Sound, New York
- Ezra Tucker – illustration

== Charts ==
=== Singles ===
Year	Single	Chart	Position
1989	"There Goes the Neighborhood"	Hot Mainstream Rock Tracks (USA)	26
