= Kingdom of XII =

Studio album by Molly Hatchet
- Released: 22 August 2000 (Europe); 5 June 2001 (US)
- Recorded: Karo Studios, Brackel, Germany
- Genre: Southern rock
- Length: 57:40
- Labels: SPV (Europe), CMC/Sanctuary (US)
- Producer: Bobby Ingram

Molly Hatchet chronology
Silent Reign of Heroes (1998)	Kingdom of XII (2000)	Warriors of the Rainbow Bridge (2005)

Professional ratings
Review scores
Source	Rating
AllMusic	3/5 stars

Kingdom of XII is the tenth studio album by American southern rock band Molly Hatchet, released in 2000 by the German label SPV. It was reissued in the United States in 2001 by CMC International, a division of Sanctuary Records Group.

== Track listing ==
1. "Heart of the USA" (Bobby Ingram, Phil McCormack) – 4:01
2. "Cornbread Mafia" (Ingram, McCormack) – 3:28
3. "One Last Ride" (Ingram, McCormack) – 7:47
4. "Why Won't You Take Me Home" (Ingram, McCormack, Andy McKinney) – 3:22
5. "Turn My Back on Yesterday" (Ingram, McCormack) – 5:04
6. "Gypsy Trail" (Ingram, McCormack, John Galvin) – 3:47
7. "White Lightning" (Ingram, McCormack, Galvin) – 3:51
8. "Tumbling Dice" (Mick Jagger, Keith Richards) – 3:13
9. "Angel in Dixie" (Ingram, McCormack) – 4:08
10. "Kickstart to Freedom" (Ingram, McCormack) – 4:37
11. "Dreams of Life" (Ingram, McCormack) – 7:12
12. "Edge of Sundown" (acoustic version) (Ingram, Galvin, Danny Joe Brown, Kenny McVay, David Bush) – 7:10

=== 2001 CD re-issue bonus track ===
11. "Bordertown" (Bryan Bassett) – 4:01

== Personnel ==
Molly Hatchet

- Phil McCormack – lead vocals, harmonica
- Bobby Ingram – guitars, acoustic guitar, slide guitar, backing vocals, producer
- Bryan Bassett – guitars
- John Galvin – keyboards, backing vocals
- Andy McKinney – bass, backing vocals
- Sean Shannon – drums, percussion

Additional musicians

- Russ Maxwell – guitars
- Tim Donovan – keyboards
- Charlie Daniels – fiddle
- Rolf Köhler – backing vocals

Production

- Nikolo Kotzev – engineer, mixing, mastering

== Charts ==
Chart (2000)	Peak position
German Albums (Offizielle Top 100)	80
