= Gator Country =

American band

- Origin: Davie, Florida, U.S.
- Genres: Southern rock, hard rock, blues rock
- Years active: 2005–2010
- Labels: Go West!, GWP
- Past members: Jimmy Farrar; Steve Holland; Riff West; Linni Disse; Paul Chapman; Duane Roland; Bruce Crump; JoAnn Hudson

Gator Country was an American Southern rock band formed in Davie, Florida, in 2005 by several ex-members of the Southern rock group Molly Hatchet. The band, founded by vocalist Jimmy Farrar, guitarist Duane Roland, drummer Bruce Crump, guitarist Steve Holland, and bassist Riff West took its name from the title of the hit song, "Gator Country".

In 2006, Gator Country, led by vocalist Jimmy Farrar, continued to perform popular songs such as "Beatin' The Odds", "Bounty Hunter" as well as "Oh Atlanta".

== Background ==
On June 19, 2006, founding guitarist Duane Roland died at his home in St. Augustine, Florida, at the age of 53. He had been playing with the band Gator Country as late as May 2006. His death was listed as being of "natural causes" according to a June 25, 2006, The Boston Globe obituary report.

Guitarist Paul Chapman (ex-Lone Star; ex-UFO) joined the band in July 2006.

A live album, entitled 'Gator Country Live', was released in 2008 on GWP Records.

In July 2008, the Gator Country band website reported that lead singer Jimmy Farrar had suffered a mild stroke. According to the web site: "It is true that Jimmy, our beloved brother and front man, suffered a stroke a couple of weeks ago. He woke up, as he puts it, "Feelin' kind of funky," on his left side. As strokes go, it was a mild one and he is having very minimal effects as a result. The first morning in the hospital they had him up and walking the halls and he's been mobile ever since. The only complaint he has is a little weakness in his left arm. Some physical therapy is expected to help with that."

Bass player Riff West died in late 2014. Former drummer Bruce Crump died on March 16, 2015, aged 57.

Farrar died on October 29, 2018, due to heart failure, at the age of 67. Paul Chapman died on June 9, 2020 and Steve Holland died on August 2, 2020.

Guitarist Linni Disse went on to perform with various bands in Richmond, Virginia, including Sweet Justice, Red Star Crush and Cracker Jackson, as well as playing in a Molly Hatchet tribute band called 'Dreams I'll Never See'.

== Members ==
- Jimmy Farrar, vocalist – died 2018
- Bruce Crump, drummer – died 2015
- Duane Roland, guitarist – died 2006
- Steve Holland, guitarist - died 2020
- Riff West, bassist – died 2014
- Linni Disse, guitarist - died 2025
- Paul Chapman, guitarist - died 2020
- JoAnn Hudson, keyboards

== Discography ==
- "Oh Atlanta", single (2008)
- "Gator Country Live", album (2008)
