= Paul R. Gregory =

British artist (born 1949)

- Born: Paul Raymond Gregory; 12 July 1949 (age 77); Derby, England, UK
- Known for: Album art
- Notable work: Justice; Devil's Canyon
- Style: Fantasy art
- Website: www.studio54.co.uk

Paul Raymond Gregory (born 12 July 1949) is an English artist, best known for his J. R. R. Tolkien-inspired fantasy paintings and rock album covers. He has also created book covers and is a co-founder of Bloodstock Open Air Heavy Metal Festival. Gregory has created a total of 30 album covers for well known rock musicians and solo artists, such as Molly Hatchet, Dio, Uriah Heep, Blind Guardian, Saxon and Nowadays.

== Career ==
During the 1970s, Gregory opened a gallery in his home village, where he exhibited several local and international artists' work. Around this time, he began producing a series of paintings based on J. R. R. Tolkien's epic tale The Lord of the Rings. His first canvas was completed in 1978 and measured 10 feet (3.0 m) x 6 feet (1.8 m). His Tolkien artwork, album artwork and other collected works are featured in a book he authored. As of 2015, art dealer Peter Nahum owns most of the Tolkien-inspired artwork.

Greogory's Tolkien-inspired fantasy art has been featured on 30 album covers. In 1984 Gregory painted the sleeve artwork for Saxon's album Crusader, the first of fifteen for the band. Other rock and heavy metal bands for whom he has designed sleeves include Dio, Uriah Heep, Blind Guardian, Molly Hatchet, Freedom Call, The Company of Snakes, Beholder and Battalion.

He has also produced cover art for books by fantasy novelist Cecilia Dart-Thornton.

In 2001, Gregory co-founded Amust4music, the company behind Bloodstock Open Air—an event which currently attracts crowds of around 15,000.

== Books ==
- "Beyond Time And Place: The Art of Paul Raymond Gregory".

== DVD documentary ==
- Paul Raymond Gregory's RingQuest, Narrated by Julian Sands; Narration written by Peter Nahum; Executive producer: Peter Nahum; Produced, directed and edited by Mathias Walin; Photography and sound by Martin Sundström.

== See also ==
- The Lady of the Sorrows
- Angry Machines
- Unleash the Beast
- Heavy Metal Thunder (Saxon album)
- Justice (Molly Hatchet album)
- Devil's Canyon (album)
