= Molly Hatchet =

American Southern rock band

- Molly Hatchet in 1982

Background information
- Origin: Jacksonville, Florida, U.S.
- Genres: Southern rock; hard rock; blues rock; boogie rock; jam rock
- Years active: 1971–present
- Labels: Epic; Capitol; SPV/Steamhammer
- Members: Bobby Ingram; John Galvin; Tim Lindsey; Parker Lee; Garrett Ramsden
- Past members: Dave Hlubek; Steve Holland; Banner Thomas; Bruce Crump; Danny Joe Brown; Duane Roland; Jimmy Farrar; Riff West; B. B. Borden; Rob Sweat; Kevin Rian; Phil McCormack; Mac Crawford; Andy McKinney; Bryan Bassett Mike Owings; Sean Shannon; Russ Maxwell; Jerry Scott; J. J. Strickland; Jake Rutter; Jimmy Elkins; Shawn Beamer
- Website: mollyhatchet.com

Molly Hatchet is an American rock band formed by guitarist Dave Hlubek in Jacksonville, Florida in 1971. They experienced popularity and commercial success during the late 1970s and early to mid-1980s amongst southern rock and hard rock fans. The band released six studio albums on Epic Records between 1978 and 1984, including the platinum-selling hit records Molly Hatchet (1978), Flirtin' with Disaster (1979) and Beatin' the Odds (1980). They also had charting singles on the US Billboard charts, including "Flirtin' with Disaster", "The Rambler", "Bloody Reunion" and "Satisfied Man". Molly Hatchet has released many more studio albums since their split with Epic Records in 1985, although none have been as successful as their early albums, nor have charted in the United States.

As of August 2, 2020, all of the band's original members are deceased. The Molly Hatchet trademark is owned by Bobby Ingram, their guitarist since 1987 (when he replaced founding member Dave Hlubek, who rejoined the band eighteen years later and stayed with them until his death in 2017). The other veterans in the lineup are keyboardist John Galvin, who has been a member since 1984 (with the exception of a break in the mid-1990s), and bassist Tim Lindsey, with vocalist Parker Lee and drummer Garrett Ramsden rounding out the current incarnation of the band.

== History ==
=== Classic era and commercial success (1971–1980) ===
Molly Hatchet was founded by guitarist Dave Hlubek in 1971. The band originated and was based in Jacksonville, Florida, and shared influences and inspiration with what is perhaps the most well-known act in the Southern rock genre, Lynyrd Skynyrd.

During the late 1960s, Hlubek (vocals, guitar), Sandy Heath (guitar), Skip Lake (drums), Tim Lindsey (bass) and Chris Caruso (keyboards) were in the Psychedelic music outfit Mind Garden. Hlubek and Lake formed a new band in 1971, along with bassist Tim Lindsey, lead singer/frontman Bobby Maddox and guitarist Steve Holland, who had replaced Caruso. Guitarist Donald Hall was also briefly a member in these early days, after Holland left temporarily in 1973. Lindsey left before Molly Hatchet's debut gigs, eventually being replaced by Banner Thomas, but would rejoin the lineup decades later and is a member to this day.

In an interview Dave Hlubek told the story of the band's name:

"A friend of ours went to University of Florida in Gainesville. Bobby Maddox was his name. This was long before Danny Joe. Bobby Maddox was a real Mick Jagger type. We were looking for a name for the band. We were wanting to work. There were around twelve rock clubs in the Jacksonville area in the 70s. You could make a hell of a living. By the time you made your way through the twelfth, it was time to start all over again. We were changing the name of the band every two weeks. They would just get used to the name of the group and we would finish the twelfth club and start over as "The Imbeciles" or something. People would not know who we were. This was the same band that packed the place a few weeks before. Finally, we said, 'We need to come up with a name for the group.' We took a John Deere Tractor hat and everybody came up with three names apiece and put them in the hat. We did it like the lottery. We said that whatever name was pulled out of the hat, by God, was going to be the name of the band and that's it. Well, the eighteenth name, the only one left, was Molly Hatchet! We said, ‘What the hell is that'? Everyone was asking, ‘Who's the girl in the band'? The people of Jacksonville took it upon themselves to start making bumper stickers. We just kept the name. Molly was an axe murderess. Her name was Abigail something. The history books called her Hatchet Molly. She was some passion killer.

Bassist Banner Thomas joined in 1973, invited by his friend Donald Hall. During this period, the band even toyed with changing the group's name to Bandit but soon went back to the Molly Hatchet moniker. Maddox was gone by this time and shortly afterwards, Hall was replaced by Duane Roland and Fred Bianco, a friend Thomas had met working in a music store, joined as drummer. Roland only lasted a month before he left and Kenny Niblick was the new guitarist until he and Bianco quit in mid-1975 as Steve Holland returned and Bruce Crump became the drummer. Roland (who had subbed for Hlubek for some shows) returned to take his position as third guitarist in the band later on the following year. And after Maddox had left, Hlubek was the band's vocalist prior to former Rum Creek singer Danny Joe Brown's entrance in the spring of 1976.

The first lineup of Molly Hatchet to record was in place by 1976. Guitarists Dave Hlubek and Steve Holland, bassist Banner Thomas and drummer Bruce Crump were joined in the spring of 1976 by Brown. And Duane Roland returned later during that same year to complete the group, leading to the so called "Three Guitar Army". In a 2008 interview in Modern Drummer magazine, Crump talked about the band's early days, signing with manager Pat Armstrong and Ronnie Van Zant's interest in producing Molly Hatchet:

"We started playing the Florida bar circuit until some of the guys from 38 Special recommended a guy they knew from Macon, Georgia who had managed a few bands. Pat Armstrong and his brother Jack ran a management/booking agency in Macon, so we went up and played for them. I guess they liked what they heard, because they encouraged us to start writing our own material. We did just that, and the next thing you know, we’re in the studio recording some demos. By now we’re into 1977, and Ronnie Van Zant from Skynyrd got wind of what we were doing and took us under his wing—even letting us cut some songs at the Skynyrd studio. As best as I can remember, Ronnie was given the green light to produce some bands and we were going to be one of them. Then the worst possible thing happened. We were coming back to Atlanta after playing a gig near Lynchburg, Tennessee. When we pulled into the hotel parking lot, Pat Armstrong, who had become our manager and had gone with us, went inside the hotel to check us in. All of a sudden, he walked onto the bus, white as a sheet, and said that the Skynyrd plane had crashed."

After meeting recording engineer Tony Reale in Atlanta, Armstrong was introduced to Epic Records producer and A&R man Tom Werman, who recommended them to Epic head Lenny Petze, who signed the band in December 1977. Werman, the producer on their first record, who was known for working with straight rock music acts such as Cheap Trick and Ted Nugent, combined boogie, blues and hard rock.

The band released their first album, Molly Hatchet, in September 1978, supported by "Dreams I'll Never See" (a cover of the Allman Brothers Band 1969 track "Dreams"), which got AOR (album-oriented rock) airplay.

The album was followed a year later by Flirtin' with Disaster, with its title song another AOR hit, as was its first track, "Whiskey Man", from the album. Molly Hatchet proceeded to tour behind both records and expanded their fan base, appearing at theaters, arenas and stadiums with the likes of AC/DC, Aerosmith, The Babys, The Charlie Daniels Band, Cheap Trick, Def Leppard, Journey, Judas Priest, Eddie Money, The Outlaws, REO Speedwagon, Rush, Santana, Scorpions, Bob Seger, Thin Lizzy, .38 Special, Pat Travers, UFO and The Who.

=== First changes and breakup (1980–1990) ===
Lead singer Danny Joe Brown left the band in May 1980 due to diabetes and conflicts with the others, only to return two years later. After Brown left Molly Hatchet, he formed the Danny Joe Brown Band.

Brown was then replaced in Molly Hatchet by vocalist Jimmy Farrar, a native of LaGrange, Georgia. The earlier albums seemed to some commentators to exhibit a distinct southern cultural influence; that sound changed with the addition of Farrar. Danny Joe Brown's stage persona, gruff voice and cowboy horse-whistling were replaced by Jimmy Farrar's new vocal style, mixed with a new, harder-rocking sound.

With the success of the next album, Beatin' the Odds released in September 1980, the band had started to venture away from the Southern rock sound of their first albums. Nonetheless, Molly Hatchet toured successfully in support of Beatin' the Odds, opening for bands such as Blue Öyster Cult, AC/DC and The Outlaws, as well as headlining their own tour that was supported by the Michael Schenker Group and the Johnny Van Zant Band.

By 1981, Molly Hatchet had evolved to a straight-ahead rock style and a slicker production, as exhibited on Take No Prisoners (November 1981). The band remained a successful act on the touring circuit.

Longtime bass player Banner Thomas abruptly quit the band after playing a show with the Rolling Stones at the Carrier Dome in Syracuse, New York on November 28, 1981 following a heated argument with the other band members and was replaced by Ralph "Riff" West (ex-White Witch).

During the following year, drummer B. B. Borden (also known as B. B. Queen as a member of the funk rock band Mother's Finest) replaced Crump, who had moved to Los Angeles. Farrar then left the group to make way for Brown's return. Brown rejoined the band in May 1982.

In March 1983 the line-up of Brown, Hlubek, Holland, Roland, West and Borden released the band's fifth album No Guts...No Glory. While touring for the album during the spring and summer of 1983, Hatchet was touring with fellow Jacksonville natives Blackfoot. Just before a gig at Memorial Hall in Kansas City, Kansas on June 11, 1983, though, Brown, Holland and Roland decided to leave and return home, leaving only Hlubek, West and Borden to play the show. After a quick rehearsal backstage, Blackfoot's Rickey Medlocke took Brown's place as front man and their other guitarist, Charlie Hargrett, played behind Hlubek's lead. Danny and the other members of Molly Hatchet rejoined the tour the next day, but Holland decided to leave the band once again in 1984 and was replaced by former Danny Joe Brown Band keyboardist John Galvin, who already guested in No Guts..No Glory the year before.

In November 1984, the album The Deed Is Done was released, produced by Terry Manning, which was more of a straightforward Pop rock offering, with Bruce Crump returning on drums.

November 1985 featured the unveiling of the band's double live album Double Trouble Live, after which the band was dropped by Epic. After mulling over possibly changing their sound to even more of a Pop rock style, they ended up retaining Brown and their Southern rock style.

Guitarist/founder Hlubek, who later admitted to suffering from drug troubles, left Molly Hatchet in January 1987. He was replaced by Bobby Ingram, who had contributed backup vocals to Double Trouble, had played as a guitarist in the Danny Joe Brown Band together with John Galvin and had also played in the Seventies with Brown in Rum Creek.

In the summer of 1988, Scott Zsymoski filled in on drums for Bruce Crump, who was home with his wife as she was giving birth to their baby.

Molly Hatchet's first studio album in five years, and only release on Capitol Records, Lightning Strikes Twice was released in 1989, and was their first one not to appear on the charts. One of its singles, "There Goes the Neighborhood", did, however, enter the top 30 on the Hot Mainstream Rock Tracks chart. The band went on a year-long tour to support the album, playing smaller venues such as clubs and theaters, as opposed to the stadiums and arenas that had expanded their popularity.

On July 8, 1990 Molly Hatchet, which had been dropped by Capitol after the commercial failure of Lighting Strikes Twice, announced at a show in Toledo, Ohio, that the concert would be their final one; after that night, the band would be disbanding. A greatest hits collection released by Epic, Greatest Hits, featuring two newly recorded songs, was released in the fall of 1990, with sales reaching gold status. At the time Duane Roland, left as last in 1990, was the owner of the Molly Hatchet name. The agreement in the band had always been that the last man standing got the brand.

=== Refoundation and rotating musicians (1990–2005) ===
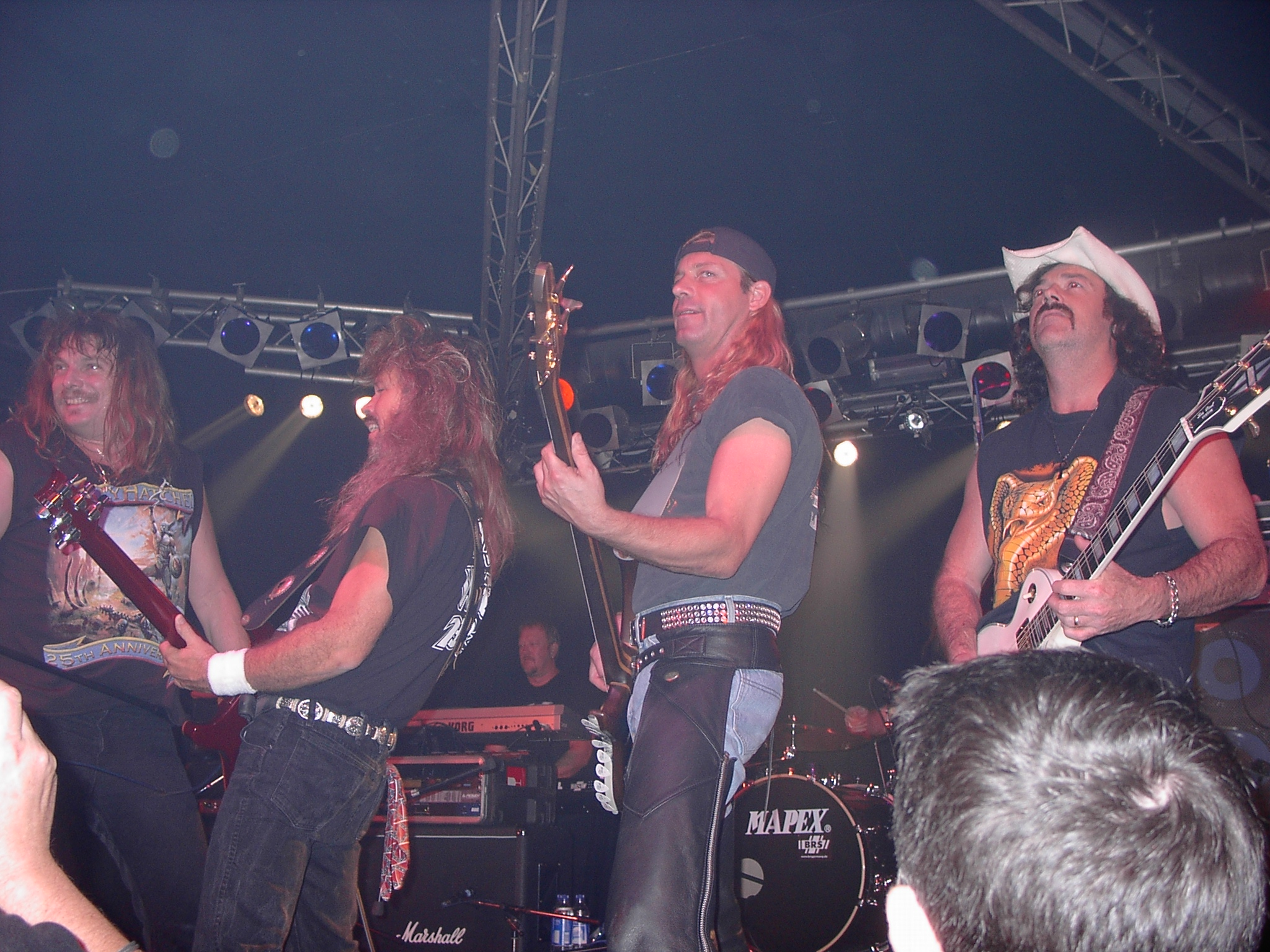
Molly Hatchet performing in 2003

In late 1990, after some failed attempts to involve former members, a revised version of the band led by Brown and Ingram - both temporarily licensed from guitarist Duane Roland and Armstrong Management to the use of the name Molly Hatchet - featured new players Rik Blanz (guitar), Rob Scavetto (keyboards), Eddie Rio (bass) and David Feagle (drums). But the lineup in the 1990s was more like a revolving door. Rio was replaced in 1991 by Rob Sweat and then Kevin Rian. Feagle was succeeded the same year by drummer Kenny Holton. Blanz left in mid-1991 and Phil McCormack stood in for Brown briefly in early 1992.

By 1993, the lineup was: Brown, Ingram, Erik Lundgren (guitar, from The Johnny Van Zant Band), Mac Crawford (drums) and a returning Banner Thomas (bass), with Mike Kach (keyboards), who was replaced in 1994 by Andy Orth. Bryan Bassett (ex-Wild Cherry) took over as second guitarist in 1994 and Buzzy Meekins (formerly of the Outlaws and Danny Joe Brown Band) was bassist after Banner left again in 1995.

During the first half of the 1990s, Molly Hatchet played selected shows and tours, but did not record again until 1995, when they began working on a new studio album with German producer Kalle Trapp.

In April 1995 after continuing health problems, Brown had to once again leave the band and Jimmy Farrar was brought back for a few weeks to front the group and help "legitimize" the current version. The crowd reaction to Farrar being back was not overly positive, though, so Ingram and Brown together made the decision to bring back Brown's 1992 stand-in, Phil McCormack, as the permanent singer. During the rest of the decade, the line-up did not feature any of the members who had performed in Molly Hatchet prior to 1983. Farrar later rejoined other original members of Molly Hatchet in Southern Rock Allstars and Gator Country.

McCormack fronted Molly Hatchet for their next album Devil's Canyon (June 1996). At this point, the band consisted of vocalist Phil McCormack, guitarists Bobby Ingram and Bryan Bassett, returning keyboardist John Galvin, bassist Andy McKinney and drummer Mac Crawford.

This line-up recorded also one second album Silent Reign of Heroes (June 1998). In that same period, keyboardist Tim Donovan began filling in for Galvin on the road and Sean Shannon became the group's new drummer in 1998 after Crawford left.

In 1999 the band traveled coast to coast with Charlie Daniels and the Volunteer Jam. Guitarist Mike Owings briefly filled in for Bassett in 1999 when he returned to help out his old band Foghat. He was back by the end of that year, but was then called away from Hatchet again in 2000 to become Foghat's permanent axe man.

Former Hatchet singer Danny Joe Brown, despite a long battle with diabetes and the effects of a stroke, was able to take the stage one last time at the Jammin' for DJB benefit concert organized by former Hatchet bassist Riff West on July 18, 1999, at Orlando, Florida's Club LaVela. With the help of his friends and former members Bruce Crump, Banner Thomas, Steve Holland and Dave Hlubek, he ended the show with "Flirtin' with Disaster".

In June 2000 Bobby Ingram became the sole owner of the trade and service mark "Molly Hatchet", acquired from management and from original guitarist Duane Roland. Also in 2000, Kingdom of XII was recorded by the stable line-up of McCormack, Ingram, Bassett, Galvin, McKinney and Shannon and released in Europe and they then toured Europe to promote the album. It was released in the United States in June 2001. But new changes were ahead: after the recording of Kingdom, guitarist Russ Maxwell came aboard after Bassett left the group to rejoin Foghat.

Drummer Dale Rock replaced Sean Shannon in 2001 before Shawn Beamer (from Southern Rock Rebellion) took over the drum chair permanently that fall. Bassist Jerry Scott (formerly with Brian Howe's band) joined in early 2002 after McKinney departed. That same year, Ingram took a short break from touring after suffering a heart attack and the band continued with only Maxwell on guitar. Also John Galvin, though he continued to appear on the band's albums, was again not touring with the band in the 2000s (except for a short European tour in December 2001). Tim Donovan (1997–2002), Scott Woods (2002), Jeff Ravenscraft (2003–2004), Gary Corbett (2004) and Richie Del Favero (2004–2005) played live keyboards until 2005, after which the group dispensed with having a touring keyboardist for a while. Bassist Jerry Scott was replaced by J.J. Strickland in May 2003 and then by Tim Lindsey, formerly of Lynyrd Skynyrd, the Rossington Band, Artimus Pyle Band and pre-Hatchet projects with longtime friend Dave Hlubek, coming full circle back to his roots to take over in June 2003. Locked and Loaded (a live recording from 2000) was released in 2003, 25th Anniversary: Best of Re-Recorded followed in 2004, and Live In Hamburg (with second guitarist Jake Rutter) in 2005.

=== Continued activity and deaths of former members (2005–2023) ===
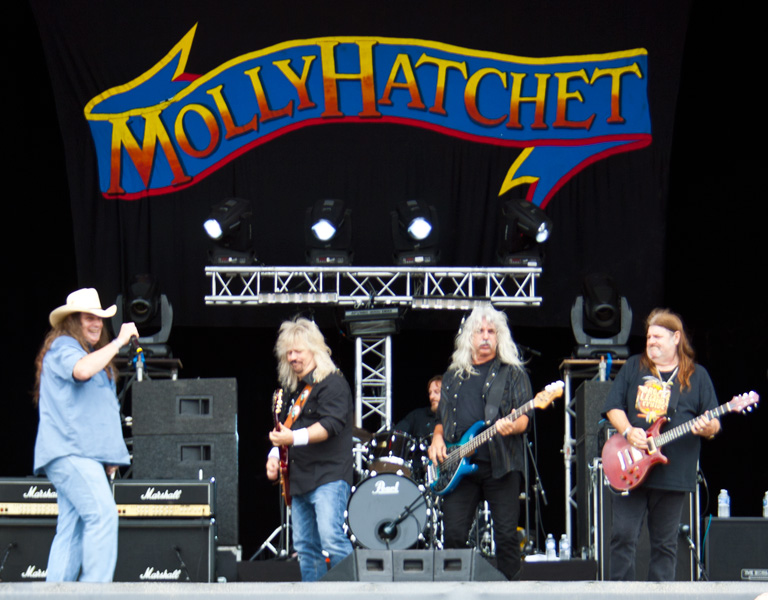
Molly Hatchet at Hellfest 2012

From that point Molly Hatchet kept on producing music around the core duo Ingram/Galvin plus rhythm section Lindsey/Beamer, with McCormack as frontman. But 2005 marked also the return of founding member Dave Hlubek after 18 years. Initially another guitarist, Jimbo Manion, played live alongside Ingram until Hlubek had satisfied his other commitments and was able to return full time later that year.

Danny Joe Brown died on March 10, 2005 at his home in Davie, Florida. He was 53. The cause was kidney failure. On June 19, 2006 guitarist Duane Roland died at his home in St. Augustine, Florida, at the age of 53. His death was listed as being of "natural causes" according to a June 25, 2006, obituary in The Boston Globe.

Singer David "Dino" Ramsey filled in for an ill McCormack during the spring of 2006.

With Hlubek back in the line-up, Molly Hatchet released studio albums Warriors Of The Rainbow Bridge (2005) and Justice (recorded in Germany in 2010 on SPV Records), plus one live and two cover albums. The band's Southern Rock Masters (April 2008) was an album of classic rock covers and was released again in a slightly realtered form as Regrinding the Axes (June 2012). Molly Hatchet toured extensively once again.

In 2008 keyboardist John Galvin returned to the live stage after Hlubek's recurring health issues prevented him from appearing at all of the band's gigs.

In 2011 drummer Shawn Beamer had a heart attack and a temporary drummer, Scott Craig, was brought in. In 2013 Beamer returned to the band.

In 2014 former bassist "Riff" West died from the complications of a car accident, while in 2015 it was original drummer Bruce Crump who died after a bout with throat cancer. On September 2, 2017, guitarist Dave Hlubek died of a heart attack. After Hlubek's passing, the group continued to perform with just one guitarist, as Ingram stated that he "could not" replace him. The typical guitar harmonies of the band are reproduced by Ingram and the keyboards of Galvin. In the same year also original bassist Banner Thomas died. On October 29, 2018, former singer of the Eighties Jimmy Farrar died due to complications from congestive heart failure, kidney failure and liver failure.

Molly Hatchet continued to tour extensively but had to replace frontman Phil McCormack due to persistent illness conditions. Singer Jimmy Elkins, from a Hatchet tribute band called Bounty Hunter, took his place for live gigs. McCormack died on April 25, 2019.

Jimmy Elkins was officially announced as the band's new vocalist in October 2019: he is featured on the Battleground live album. Tony Mikus (Big Engine) briefly stood in for Elkins in some live gigs of 2022.

Steve Holland, the last original member of the group, died on August 2, 2020.

=== Recent events (2023–present) ===
Despite having no original members left, Molly Hatchet continues to perform extensively both in the US and Europe, and record. The core members of the current incarnation of the band are half of the Lightning Strikes Twice lineup (veterans guitarist Bobby Ingram and keyboardist John Galvin), plus longtime serving bassist Tim Lindsey.

In early 2023, new singer Parker Lee suddenly replaced Jimmy Elkins (who suffered a bad bike accident) fronting the band in US and European tours. Ingram reported to the press that a new Molly Hatchet album was in the works and intended for a 2024 release. The band debuted with Lee on vocals "Firing Line", their first song in thirteen years, on November 15, 2023. Longtime drummer Shawn Beamer stopped touring in 2024, being gradually replaced by Garrett Ramsden. On August 28, 2026, Molly Hatchet launch a new lyric video, "Dixie Highway", and announce their new album Lost Horizon, the first studio effort since 2010, recorded at the legendary Abbey Road Studios in London and due to be released on November 27.

== Artistry ==
=== Musical style and classification ===
Molly Hatchet's sound is known for combining various elements of hard rock, Boogie rock, southern rock. The band's music also employs jam sessions.

=== Band name and artwork ===
Molly Hatchet allegedly took its name from a historical axe murderer, but which one is unclear; said to be a prostitute who mutilated and decapitated her clients, the band has also mentioned that Molly may be just a nickname and her actual name may have been Abigail, although the story overall may simply be apocryphal. One iconic aspect of Molly Hatchet's image is that many of the band's album covers feature art inspired by heroic fantasy, several of which were painted by artists such as Frank Frazetta, Boris Vallejo, and Paul R. Gregory.

== Members ==
Current members

- Bobby Ingram – lead, acoustic and slide guitars, backing vocals (1987–present)
- John Galvin – keyboards, synthesizers, piano, programming, backing vocals (1984–1990, 1995–present)
- Tim Lindsey – bass, backing vocals (2003–present)
- Parker Lee – lead vocals (2023–present)
- Garrett Ramsden – drums, percussion (2024–present)

=== Deaths of former members ===
- Original vocalist Danny Joe Brown died in Davie, Florida, on March 10, 2005, at the age of 53. His obituary attributed his death to kidney failure, a complication of the diabetes he had since age 19, along with Hepatitis C.
- Original guitarist Duane Roland died at his home in St. Augustine, Florida in 2006 of natural causes at the age of 53.
- Bass player Riff West died on November 19, 2014, at age 64, after a lengthy illness caused by severe injuries suffered in a car accident.
- Original drummer Bruce Crump died on March 16, 2015, at age 57, from complications after a 12-year battle with throat cancer.
- Bassist Thomas "Buzzy" Meekins died on May 14, 2015 from congestive heart failure at the age of 63.
- Original bassist Banner Thomas, age 62, died from complications of pneumonia and rheumatoid arthritis on April 10, 2017.
- Founder and original guitarist Dave Hlubek died of a heart attack on September 2, 2017, at the age of 66.
- Jimmy Farrar, who was frontman from 1980 to 1982, died of heart failure on October 29, 2018, at 67.
- Singer Phil McCormack died on April 26, 2019, at 58. McCormack had been sidelined in early 2019, after suffering from health troubles that affected his voice.
- Original guitarist Steve Holland, in the band from 1971 to 1984, died on August 2, 2020, of pneumonia as a complication of COVID-19 at age 66.
- Bassist Andy McKinney, who was in Molly Hatchet from 1995 to 2000, died on August 22, 2025, at the age of 56.
- Bassist Rob Sweat, who was briefly in Molly Hatchet in 1991, died on December 4, 2025, at the age of 56.

== Discography ==
=== Studio albums ===
| Year | Album | Peak chart positions | | Certification | |
| Year | Album | US | CAN | RIAA | CRIA |
|---|---|---|---|---|---|
| 1978 | Molly Hatchet | 64 | — | Platinum | — |
| 1979 | Flirtin' with Disaster | 19 | 54 | 2× Platinum | Gold |
| 1980 | Beatin' the Odds | 25 | 90 | Platinum | — |
| 1981 | Take No Prisoners | 36 | — | — | — |
| 1983 | No Guts...No Glory | 59 | — | — | — |
| 1984 | The Deed Is Done | 120 | — | — | — |
| 1989 | Lightning Strikes Twice | — | — | — | — |
| 1996 | Devil's Canyon | — | — | — | — |
| 1998 | Silent Reign of Heroes | — | — | — | — |
| 2000 | Kingdom of XII | — | — | — | — |
| 2005 | Warriors of the Rainbow Bridge | — | — | — | — |
| 2010 | Justice | — | — | — | — |
| 2026 | Lost Horizon | To be released | | — | — |
"—" denotes the album failed to chart, not released, or not certified

=== Live albums ===
| Year | Album | Peak chart positions | |
| Year | Album | US | UK |
|---|---|---|---|
| 1981 | Molly Hatchet Live E/P/A Series | — | — |
| 1985 | Double Trouble Live | 130 | 94 |
| 2000 | Live at the Agora Ballroom Atlanta Georgia 1979 | — | — |
| 2003 | Locked and Loaded | — | — |
| 2003 | Greatest Hits Live (reissue of Extended Versions from 2002) | — | — |
| 2005 | Live In Hamburg (CD+DVD) | — | — |
| 2007 | Flirtin' with Disaster Live (CD+DVD) | — | — |
| 2013 | Live At Rockpalast 1996 | — | — |
| 2019 | Battleground | — | — |
"—" denotes album that failed to chart

=== Compilations and covers albums ===
| Year | Album | Certification |
| Year | Album | RIAA |
|---|---|---|
| 1990 | Greatest Hits | Gold |
| 1995 | Cut to the Bone | — |
| 1996 | Revisited | — |
| 1998 | Super Hits | — |
| 2003 | The Essential Molly Hatchet | — |
| 2003 | 25th Anniversary: Best of Re-Recorded | — |
| 2008 | Southern Rock Masters (reissued as Jukebox Saloon in 2020 and 2023) | — |
| 2011 | Greatest Hits II: The South Has Risen Again | — |
| 2012 | Regrinding the Axes | — |
"—" denotes album that's not certified

=== Singles ===
| Year | Single | Peak chart positions | | Album |
| Year | Single | US | US Main | Album |
|---|---|---|---|---|
| 1980 | "Flirtin' with Disaster" | 42 | — | Flirtin' with Disaster |
| 1981 | "The Rambler" | 91 | — | Beatin' the Odds |
| 1982 | "Bloody Reunion" | — | 31 | Take No Prisoners |
| 1982 | "Power Play" | 96 | — | Take No Prisoners |
| 1982 | "Lady Luck" | — | 46 | Take No Prisoners |
| 1984 | "Satisfied Man" | 81 | 13 | The Deed Is Done |
| 1985 | "Stone in Your Heart" | — | 26 | The Deed Is Done |
| 1989 | "There Goes the Neighborhood" | — | 26 | Lightning Strikes Twice |
| 2023 | "Firing Line" | — | — | N/A |

=== Radio shows ===
- Molly Hatchet Innerview (1978)
- Molly Hatchet: Climax Blues Band BBC (1979) (Reading Festival)
- Molly Hatchet - 38 Special KBFH (1980)
- Molly Hatchet Innerview (1981)
- Molly Hatchet Best of the Biscuit KBFH (1981)
- Molly Hatchet KBFH (1982)
- Molly Hatchet in Concert 1 (1982)
- Molly Hatchet in Concert 2 (1983)
- Molly Hatchet Captured Live (1984)
- Molly Hatchet in Concert 3 (1984)
- Molly Hatchet: Marshall Tucker in Concert (1996)
