= Justice (Molly Hatchet album) =

- Cover art by Paul R. Gregory

Studio album by Molly Hatchet
- Released: June 1, 2010
- Studios: Rockfarm, Bad Arolsen, Germany
- Genres: Southern rock, hard rock
- Length: 65:41
- Label: SPV/Steamhammer
- Producer: Bobby Ingram

Molly Hatchet chronology
Southern Rock Masters (2008)	Justice (2010)	Greatest Hits II (2011)

Professional ratings
Review scores
Source	Rating
AllMusic	3.5/5 stars

Justice is the thirteenth studio album by American southern rock band Molly Hatchet, released in 2010 (see 2010 in music).

== Track listing ==
All tracks are written by Bobby Ingram and Phil McCormack, except where noted.

No.	Title	Writer(s)	Length
1.	"Been to Heaven, Been to Hell"		4:35
2.	"Safe in My Skin"	Ingram, Tim Lindsey, McCormack	4:33
3.	"Deep Water"		5:38
4.	"American Pride"		4:02
5.	"I'm Gonna Live 'til I Die"		8:30
6.	"Fly on Wings of Angels (Somer's Song)"		8:06
7.	"As Heaven Is Forever"		4:47
8.	"Tomorrows and Forevers"		5:23
9.	"Vengeance"	Shawn Beamer, Ingram, McCormack	6:23
10.	"In the Darkness of the Night"		5:05
11.	"Justice"		8:39

== Personnel ==
Molly Hatchet

- Phil McCormack – lead vocals
- Bobby Ingram – guitars, acoustic guitar, backing vocals, producer, mixing
- Dave Hlubek – guitars
- John Galvin – keyboards, organ, programming
- Tim Lindsey – bass, backing vocals
- Shawn Beamer – drums, percussion

Additional musicians

- Tina Lux, Michael Bormann, Anke Renner, Abigail Thompson – backing vocals

Production

- Tommy Newton – engineer, mixing, mastering
- John Bettis, Scott Fravala, Daryl Pheeneger, Claus Kramer – engineers

== Charts ==
Chart (2010)	Peak position
German Albums (Offizielle Top 100)	79
