= The Danny Joe Brown Band =

US musical group

- Origin: Jacksonville, Florida, U.S.
- Genre: Southern rock
- Years active: 1980–1982
- Label: Epic
- Past members: Danny Joe Brown; John Galvin; Jimmy Glenn; Bobby Ingram; Kenny McVay; Buzzy Meekin; Steve Wheeler; Ronnie Able; Shane Bressette; Jimmy Polston; Billy Poovey; Al Tuten

The Danny Joe Brown Band (DJBB) was founded by lead singer Danny Joe Brown in 1980. Danny Joe Brown had just left the southern rock band Molly Hatchet, which had followed in the footsteps of Lynyrd Skynyrd and Outlaws to achieve wide national success with two multi-platinum albums and international recognition with intensive world tours.

The first line-up of the band, besides Danny Joe Brown, consisted of Bobby Ingram (guitar/slide guitar/vocals), Kenny McVay (guitar), Steve Wheeler (guitar/slide guitar/vocals), John Galvin (keyboards/vocals), Buzzy Meekins (bass/vocals) and Jimmy Glenn (drums). Ingram was an old acquaintance of Brown, having played with him in some club bands before he joined Molly Hatchet in the year 1976.

The musical emphasis of the new band remained quite close to the original style that Molly Hatchet had originated, with no frills southern rock songs about southern/western flavored topics such as gambling and The Alamo. At the same time, his former band was starting to lean more towards a straight ahead hard rock approach.

The band signed with the major label Epic Records, the same label that Molly Hatchet was on, which released their only self-titled album in 1981. The album was recorded at Compass Point Studios, Nassau, Bahamas and produced by Glyn Johns. The album featured the almost cliché cut that started out a slower more serious chord progression that evolves into the three guitar lead jam, exactly as Lynyrd Skynyrd's famous song, "Free Bird" had done. The Danny Joe Brown Band's contribution to this format was the song "Edge of Sundown". In addition to "Edge of Sundown", Wheeler's song "Nobody Walks on Me" was also submitted to MTV and enjoyed rotation.

The Danny Joe Brown Band toured nationally to promote their album to noticeably smaller crowds than Danny Joe had experienced with Molly Hatchet, although they were billed as the opening act for Blackfoot on that band's Marauder tour in 1981. Danny Joe Brown had to find a replacement band after the entire group quit just prior to the Eastern Seaboard leg of the band's US solo album tour from February through May 1982. The new members were a three-guitar line-up featuring Jimmy Polston, Billy Poovey and Al Tuten, bassist Ronnie Able, and drummer Shane Bressette, all previously known as Revelation from Beaufort, South Carolina. At the completion of the album tour, Brown returned to Molly Hatchet, after giving this latest touring outfit his blessings to continue on under the name of Bounty Hunter — which continues on to this day. Shane Bressette died in the early 1980s, but the other members continue to tour as Bounty Hunter.

The Danny Joe Brown Band achieved limited success on their own, but multiple members of the original band went on to join Molly Hatchet. At a point in the 1990s, that decade's version of Molly Hatchet was being captained by a veteran of the Danny Joe Brown Band, Bobby Ingram, while the three original members of Molly Hatchet that had made the band famous, were forced to perform under the name Gator Country due to legal contracts.

== Discography ==
- Danny Joe Brown and the Danny Joe Brown Band (1981)
