= Devil's Canyon (album) =

- Cover art by Paul R. Gregory

Studio album by Molly Hatchet
- Released: 24 June 1996
- Studios: Karo Studios, Brackel, Germany
- Genre: Southern rock
- Length: 58:28
- Label: SPV/CBH
- Producers: Kalle Trapp, Bobby Ingram, Rainer Hänsel

Molly Hatchet chronology
| Lightning Strikes Twice (1989) | Devil's Canyon (1996) | Silent Reign of Heroes (1998) |

Professional ratings
Review scores
| Source | Rating |
|---|---|
| AllMusic | 2.5/5 stars |
| Collector's Guide to Heavy Metal | 8/10 |

Devil's Canyon is the eighth studio album by American southern rock band Molly Hatchet, released in 1996 (see 1996 in music). The album was recorded seven years after Lightning Strikes Twice, with only Danny Joe Brown of the original line-up. During the recording of the album, Brown was forced to retire because of his precarious health condition and was replaced by Phil McCormack, who completed the vocal tracks.

The album cover was painted by British artist Paul Raymond Gregory.

== Track listing ==
1. "Down from the Mountain" (John Galvin, Bobby Ingram, Phil McCormack) – 4:38
2. "Rolling Thunder" (Danny Joe Brown, Ingram, Banner Thomas) – 4:03
3. "Devil's Canyon" (Brown, Ingram) – 6:18
4. "Heartless Land" (Bryan Bassett) – 6:24
5. "Never Say Never" (Bassett, McCormack) – 3:46
6. "Tatanka" (Ingram, McCormack) – 5:01
7. "Come Hell or High Water" (Ingram, McCormack) – 3:40
8. "The Look in Your Eyes" (Galvin, Ingram, McCormack) – 6:08
9. "Eat Your Heart Out" (Mac Crawford) – 3:36
10. "The Journey" (Bassett, Crawford, Galvin, Ingram) – 7:20
11. "Dreams I'll Never See" (acoustic) (Gregg Allman) – 7:25

== Personnel ==
Molly Hatchet

- Danny Joe Brown – lead vocals (credited but doesn't appear on the album)
- Phil McCormack – lead vocals
- Bobby Ingram – guitars, slide guitar, backing vocals, producer
- Bryan Bassett – guitars, acoustic guitar, backing vocals
- John Galvin – keyboards, orchestral arrangements
- Andy McKinney – bass, backing vocals
- Mac Crawford – drums, percussion, backing vocals, knee slapping

Additional musicians

- Rolf Köhler – additional backing vocals
- Mickey Barker – additional percussion

Production

- Kalle Trapp – producer, engineer, mixing
- Rainer Hänsel – executive producer
