= Danny Joe Brown =

American rock singer

- Born: August 24, 1951; Jacksonville, Florida, USA
- Died: March 10, 2005 (aged 53) Davie, Florida, USA
- Genres: Southern rock; hard rock
- Occupations: Musician; songwriter
- Instruments: Vocals; harmonica; guitar
- Years active: 1974–1995; 1998
- Label: Epic

Danny Joe Brown (August 24, 1951 – March 10, 2005) was an American singer. He was the lead singer of the Southern rock group Molly Hatchet and was co-writer of the band's biggest hits from the late 1970s.

== Biography ==
Brown was born in Jacksonville, Florida, in 1951 and graduated from Terry Parker High School in 1969. Shortly after graduating, he enlisted in the U.S. Coast Guard and was stationed in New York City for two years. Once he left the Coast Guard, Brown's focus turned solely to music and he joined Molly Hatchet in 1974.

Although not a founding member, he is best known for writing and singing on such songs as "Flirtin' with Disaster" and "Whiskey Man." He was also the vocalist on "Dreams I'll Never See," a faster-tempoed cover of the Allman Brothers song. The band's sound was immediately recognizable by Brown's distinct voice: a deep, raspy, throaty growl.

== After Molly Hatchet ==
Brown left Molly Hatchet in 1980 because of chronic diabetes and pancreatic problems, but soon started his own band, The Danny Joe Brown Band, which released a single studio album in 1981. He rejoined Molly Hatchet in 1982 only to leave again after a massive stroke in 1995 while driving to his brother's house.

After a long battle with diabetes and the effects of the stroke, Brown was able to take the stage one last time at the Jammin' for DJB benefit concert in 1998 where with the help of his friends he sang "Flirtin' with Disaster."

== Death ==
Brown moved into his mother's home in Davie, Florida, after becoming ill.

On Thursday, March 10, 2005, after Brown had been hospitalized for four weeks, he returned to his home in Davie, Florida. Less than an hour later, with family and friends at his side, he died from complications of pneumonia. He was 53 years old.

His obituary attributed his death to kidney failure, a complication of the type 1(Juvenile) diabetes he had since age 19, along with Hepatitis C.

Brown is buried at Lauderdale Memorial Park in Fort Lauderdale, Florida.

== Discography ==
=== With Molly Hatchet ===
- Molly Hatchet (1978)
- Flirtin' with Disaster (1979)
- No Guts...No Glory (1983)
- The Deed Is Done (1984)
- Double Trouble Live (1985)
- Lightning Strikes Twice (1989)
- Devil’s Canyon (1996) (credited but doesn't appear on the album)

=== With The Danny Joe Brown Band ===
- Danny Joe Brown and the Danny Joe Brown Band (1981)
