= Duane Roland =

- Born: December 3, 1952; Jeffersonville, Indiana
- Died: June 19, 2006 (aged 53) St. Augustine, Florida
- Genres: Southern rock; hard rock
- Occupations: Musician; songwriter
- Instrument: Guitar
- Years active: 1974-2006

Duane Roland (December 3, 1952 – June 19, 2006) was an American guitarist for the Southern hard rock band Molly Hatchet. He was a member of the band from its founding in the mid-1970s until his departure in 1990. After leaving the band he played with the Southern Rock Allstars and Gator Country, which included many of the founding members of Molly Hatchet.

== Early years ==
Roland was born in Jeffersonville, Indiana but moved to Florida with his family at the age of 7. Duane originally played drums in his first band, in high school, before gravitating to the guitar. He came from a musical family—his mother was a pianist and his father an "occasional guitarist".

On his decision to become a serious musician he said:

I was at the "West Palm Beach Music Festival" and the line up was Johnny Winter, Vanilla Fudge, Janis Joplin, King Crimson and the Rolling Stones. It had rained and I was laying on a piece of plastic. King Crimson was late so Johnny Winter, Janis Joplin and The Vanilla Fudge got up and jammed and I came straight up off that plastic and said, "That's what I wanna do! I watched Johnny play and that was it for me."

== Molly Hatchet ==
Duane originally tried to put a band together with Banner Thomas, and Bruce Crump but it did not really work. He made his name in Florida as a guitarist with The Ball Brothers Band. When The Ball Brothers split, Duane filled in for Dave Hlubek with Molly Hatchet when Dave was unable to make a gig. He was in.

He recorded seven albums with the band and is credited with co-writing some of the band's biggest hits, including "Bloody Reunion" and "Boogie No More". During his stay, he was famous for his ability to nail his lead spots in just one take. He was actually the only member of the classic lineup to appear on all seven albums. The only song he did not perform on was "Cheatin' Woman". Duane appeared on the 1989 album Junkyard by the band of the same name.

At the time he left in 1990, he was the owner of the Molly Hatchet brand. The agreement in the band had always been that the last man standing got the name.

Duane was the only Hatchet original to not play in the Dixie Jam Band during "Jammin' for Danny Joe Brown". Riff West (the show's organizer) cited "legal difficulties" as the reason Duane did not perform. He did, however, lend his talents by adding his guitar tracks in the studio.

== After Molly Hatchet ==
Duane quit music for almost a decade and ran a company in the field of office machine repairs and later became a call centre supervisor with an Internet company.

In 2002, Duane's employer was bought out, and unemployment beckoned. He was also suffering problems with his hip, which he had replaced in late 2002. During his recuperation, the news broke that Jimmy Farrar had joined the SRA, and it was not long before Jimmy was trying to bring Duane out again. He was on leave from the Southern Rock Allstars to recuperate from a hip operation when in November 2004, Riff West confirmed that the rumours of a reunion of sorts were true. Riff, Bruce Crump, Steve Holland, Dave Hlubek, Roland and Jimmy Farrar were rehearsing. Dave Hlubek dropped out of the project in January 2005 so the new band were the remaining five and Bruce's bandmate from Daddy-Oh, guitarist Linne Disse. They named themselves after their classic song "Gator Country" and kicked off their career in style opening for Lynyrd Skynyrd on March 12, 2005, in Orlando, FLA. "Gator Country”, included many of the founding members of Molly Hatchet.

== Death ==
Roland died at his home in St. Augustine, Florida of natural causes on June 19, 2006, at the age of 53. Drummer Bruce Crump said Roland was the anchor of Molly Hatchet during the 1980s, a time when the band's lineup was constantly changing. "During all that time, Duane was the constant," said Crump. "I can't imagine playing Molly Hatchet music without Duane Roland. It just wouldn't be the same."
