= Dave Hlubek =

American guitarist (1951–2017)

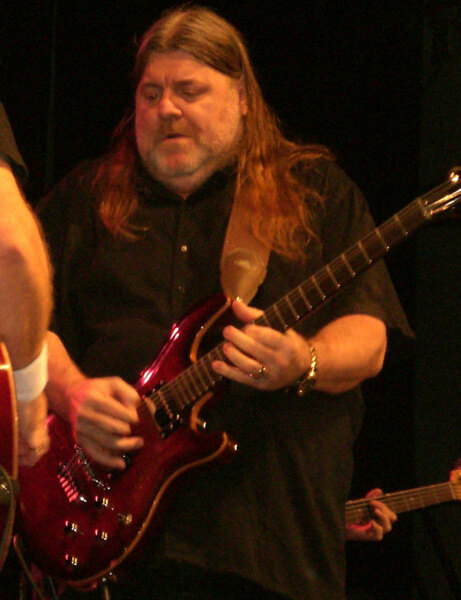
- Hlubek in 2008

Background information
- Born: David Lawrence Hlubek; August 28, 1951; Jacksonville, Florida, U.S.
- Died: September 2, 2017 (aged 66) Jacksonville, Florida
- Genres: Southern rock; hard rock
- Occupations: Musician; songwriter
- Instrument: Guitar
- Years active: 1971–2017

David Lawrence Hlubek (/ˈluːbɛk/ LOO-bek; August 28, 1951 – September 2, 2017) was an American guitarist who was the lead guitarist and founding member of the southern rock band Molly Hatchet.

== Early life and education ==
David Lawrence Hlubek was born in Jacksonville, Florida. At the age of 5, Hlubek moved with his family to the naval base in Oahu, Hawaii, where he attended Waikiki Elementary School. From there, Hlubek's father was transferred and the family moved to Sunnyvale, California, then to Mountain View, and finally settling in San Jose, before moving back to Jacksonville, Florida, in 1965. There he attended Forrest High School.

== Career ==
Hlubek founded the band Molly Hatchet in 1971 on the heels of his first band ('Mind Garden') with longtime friend/bassist Tim Lindsey. Front man/vocalist Danny Joe Brown joined in 1974, plus guitarist Duane Roland, guitarist Steve Holland, bassist Banner Thomas also joined in 1974, and drummer Bruce Crump joined in 1976. Hlubek was also the original vocalist when they started, as well as becoming the band's most prolific songwriter; writing or co-writing the majority of the group's songs, including their most famous, "Flirtin' with Disaster". When they finally signed their recording contract with Epic Records, they received help and advice from Lynyrd Skynyrd vocalist Ronnie Van Zant, who was originally supposed to produce their first album but was killed in a plane crash in 1977. While most people tagged Molly Hatchet as "Southern rock", Hlubek admits it was only because of their location. He considered Molly Hatchet, along with Blackfoot, to actually be heavy metal bands from the South. In fact, he also said that, although hard to talk about, it was the demise of Lynyrd Skynyrd, who were on top of the world at that time, that opened the door for Molly Hatchet.

In 1987, Hlubek was replaced by lead guitarist Bobby Ingram. Hlubek, by his own admission, being "unbearable" due to rock star excess and substance abuse, left the band. "I had a horrendous, horrendous cocaine problem". Hlubek then found himself at rock bottom and unemployed. His close friend Mazz moved him out of Jacksonville to Port St. Lucie, Florida, offering him moral support. Acting as Hlubek's personal manager, Mazz negotiated recording sessions and gigs and created bands featuring Hlubek. These included: Hlubek & Friends, Southern Jam Band, and the Southern Rock Legends (with the latter including former members of both Lynyrd Skynyrd and Blackfoot). After getting his life back together, Hlubek also worked with other bands including the Dixie Allstars, later renamed the Southern Rock Allstars which he co-founded with former Blackfoot drummer Jakson Spires. In 2003, he joined forces with former Lynyrd Skynyrd guitarist Mike Estes, Finnish bass player Pontus J. Back and Nashville drummer Kurt Pietro, in the band 'Skinny Molly'. In January 2005, Hlubek rejoined Molly Hatchet. Due to health issues, Hlubek had slowed down with touring and flying in general. He spent this down time working on his musical history with a ghost writer. The book, scheduled to be released in mid-November 2018 is drawn from over 28 interviews with Hlubek.

== Death ==
Hlubek died on September 2, 2017, five days after his 66th birthday, after suffering a heart attack. At the time of his death, he was the last original member of Molly Hatchet who was still a member of the band. Guitarist Steve Holland, the last living original member after Hlubek's death, left the band in 1984 and died in 2020.
