= Bruce Crump =

Molly Hatchet drummer

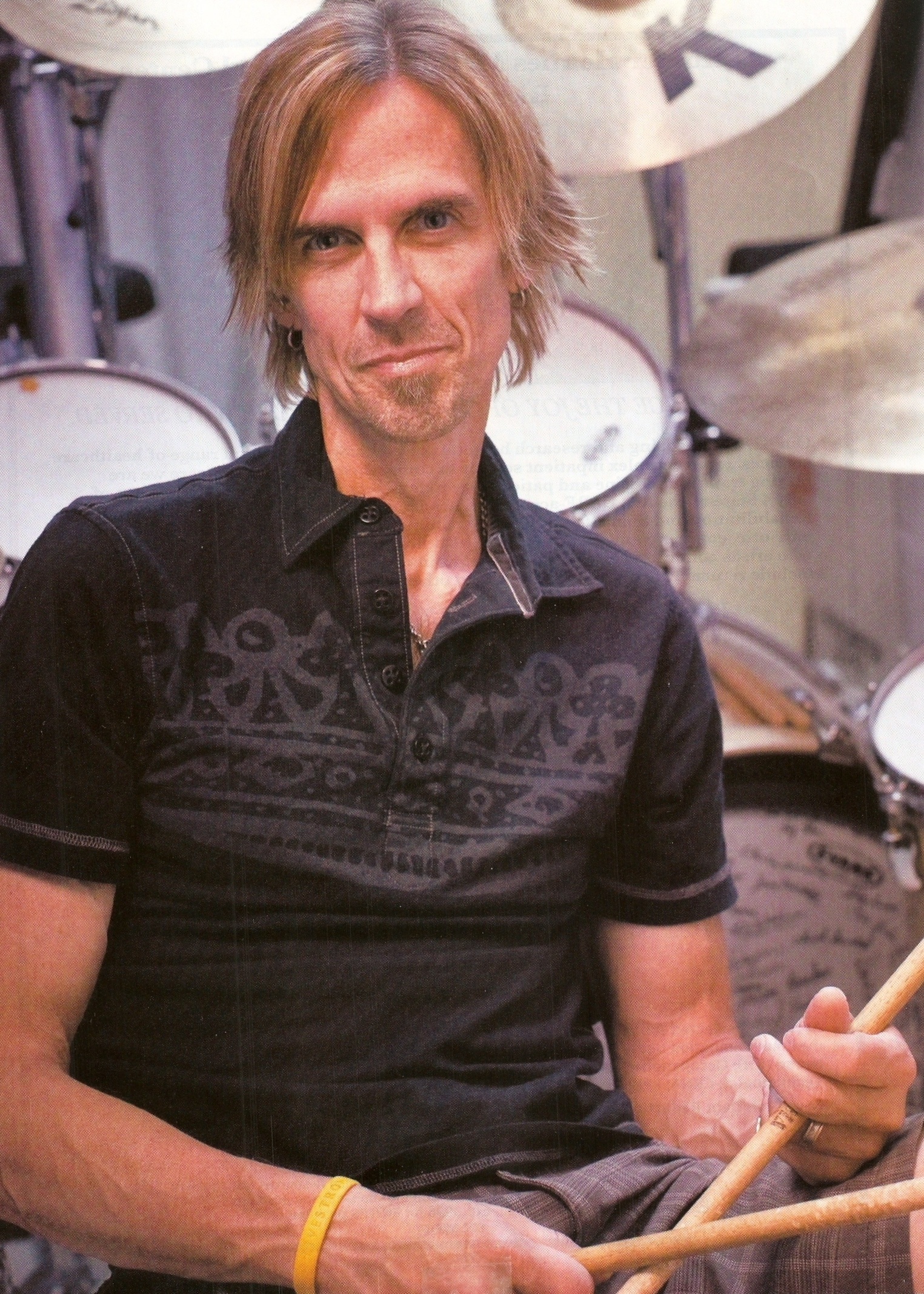
- Crump at the drums in 2008

Background information
- Born: July 17, 1957; Memphis, Tennessee, US
- Died: March 16, 2015 (aged 57)
- Genres: Southern rock; Christian rock; blues-rock; folk rock
- Occupation: Musician
- Instruments: Drums; percussion
- Years active: 1976–2015
- Labels: Epic; SPV; Capitol Records; Kivel Records
- Formerly of: Molly Hatchet; Streetheart; SMILEK; Gator Country; China Sky
- Website: Molly Hatchet official website, SMILEK official website

Bruce Hull Crump, Jr. (July 17, 1957 – March 16, 2015) was an American drummer. He is best known as a member of the rock band Molly Hatchet from 1976 to 1982 and from 1984 to 1991. He also played as a member of the Canadian band Streetheart in the early 1980s, appearing on their Live After Dark recording, and joined several of his former Molly Hatchet bandmates in the band Gator Country in the mid-2000s. At the time of his death, Crump was a member of the bands SMILEK, White Rhino and China Sky.

Crump was the great-grandson of the Memphis politician E.H. Crump.

== Personal life ==
Bruce was born in Memphis on July 17, 1957, to Donna (Morelock) Crump. He was predeceased by his father, Bruce Hull Crump Sr.

He grew up between Jacksonville and St. Augustine, Fl. He was married and had four children, three boys and one girl. He lived in Midlothian, Virginia. but called Richmond, Virginia "home".

When not involved in his band activities, he had a home business providing drum lessons, "Drum Lessons by Bruce". He was also a licensed real estate agent and briefly a website designer.

== Illness ==
In July 2002, he was diagnosed with throat cancer. He died on March 16, 2015, at age 57.
