= List of Savoy Brown members =

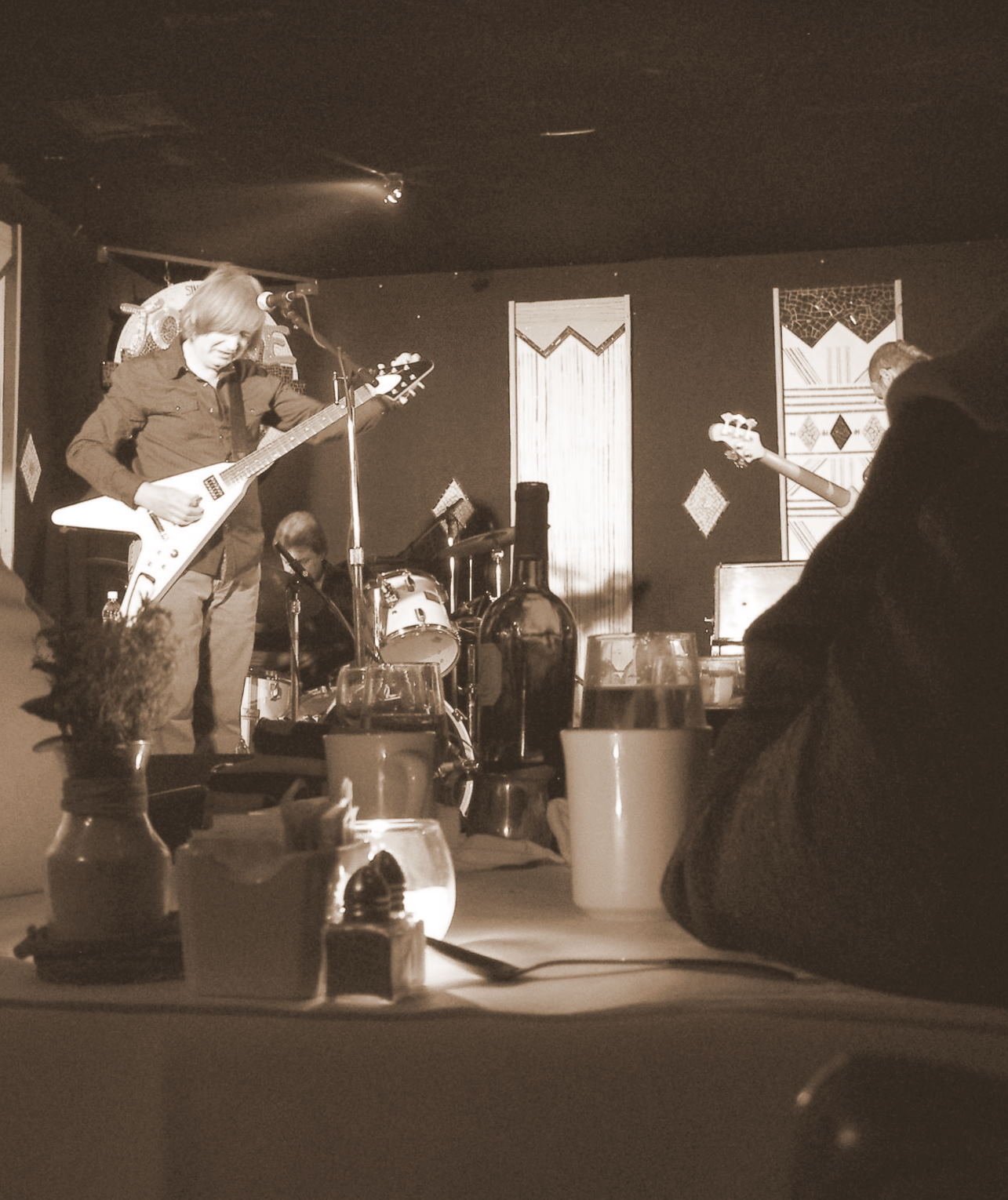
Savoy Brown performing live in 2007.

Savoy Brown were a British blues rock band from London. Formed on February 24, 1965, the group was centred around guitarist and vocalist Kim Simmonds, who was originally joined by lead vocalist Brice Portius, bassist Ray Chappell, keyboardist Trevor Jeavons, harmonica player John O'Leary and drummer Leo Mannings. The band's final line-up included Simmonds on guitar and lead vocals along with bassist Pat DeSalvo and drummer Garnet Grimm, both of whom joined in 2009.

== History ==
=== 1965–1970 ===
Kim Simmonds formed Savoy Brown in October 1965 with vocalist Brice Portius, bassist Ray Chappell, drummer Leo Mannings, keyboardist Trevor Jeavons and harmonica player John O'Leary. Shortly after the band's formation, Jeavons was replaced by Bob Hall. In 1966, the group released their first single, "I Tried". Early the next year, Martin Stone of the Action joined as a second guitarist, and a few months later O'Leary left after a dispute with manager Harry Simmonds. The remaining members recorded the group's debut album Shake Down, which was released in September 1967.

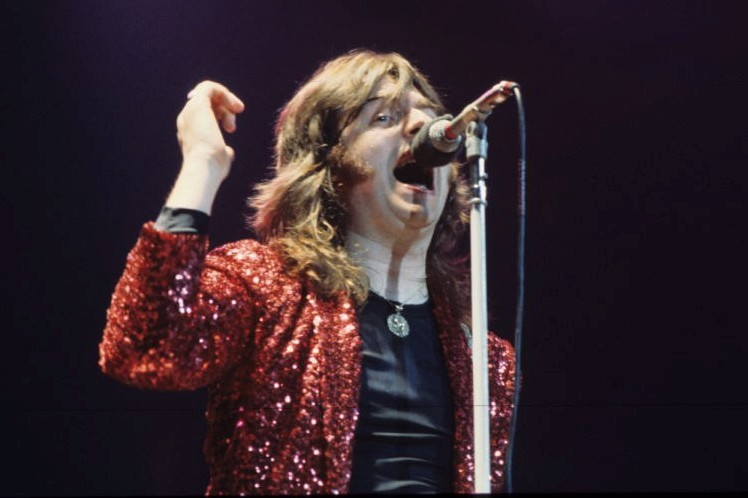
"Lonesome" Dave Peverett joined Savoy Brown in 1967 and took over lead vocals for 1970's Looking In.

Shortly after the release of Shake Down, the band went through a series of personnel changes in quick succession. First, Portius was replaced by Chris Youlden; shortly thereafter, Stone and Chappell also left, with the bassist replaced by Fleetwood Mac founding member Bob Brunning; finally, Mannings was replaced by Hughie Flint (formerly of John Mayall & the Bluesbreakers), while guitarist "Lonesome" Dave Peverett also joined in place of the departed Stone. After recording one single, "Taste and Try, Before You Buy", Brunning and Flint were both fired and replaced in the new year by Rivers Jobe (formerly of Anon) and Bill Bruford, respectively. Bruford lasted only three shows, however, before he was dismissed for "fiddling around with the rhythm".

Bruford was replaced by Roger Earl. The new lineup released "Walking by Myself" in March 1968, followed by the band's second album Getting to the Point a few months later. In November, Jobe was fired and briefly replaced by a returning Bob Brunning; however, he did not want to commit full-time, and was replaced the next month by Tony "Tone" Stevens. The new lineup recorded Blue Matter and A Step Further in 1969, the latter of which marked the final studio contribution of Bob Hall – Simmonds and Youlden shared piano duties on the next album, Raw Sienna. In May 1970, shortly after its release, Youlden left Savoy Brown and Peverett took over lead vocals. The remaining four-piece released Looking In, before Peverett, Stevens and Earl all quit in December 1970; forming Foghat the next month.

=== 1970–1976 ===
Simmonds had reformed Savoy Brown by the end of 1970 with new vocalist Pete Scott, former Blodwyn Pig bassist Andy Pyle and drummer Ron Berg, and former Chicken Shack keyboardist Paul Raymond. In May 1971, after an American tour, Scott was replaced by Dave Walker of the Idle Race, while Pyle and Berg made way for Andy Silvester and Dave Bidwell, respectively, both former bandmates of Raymond in Chicken Shack. The new lineup released Street Corner Talking and Hellbound Train, before Silvester left in June 1972 for "personal reasons" and Pyle returned.

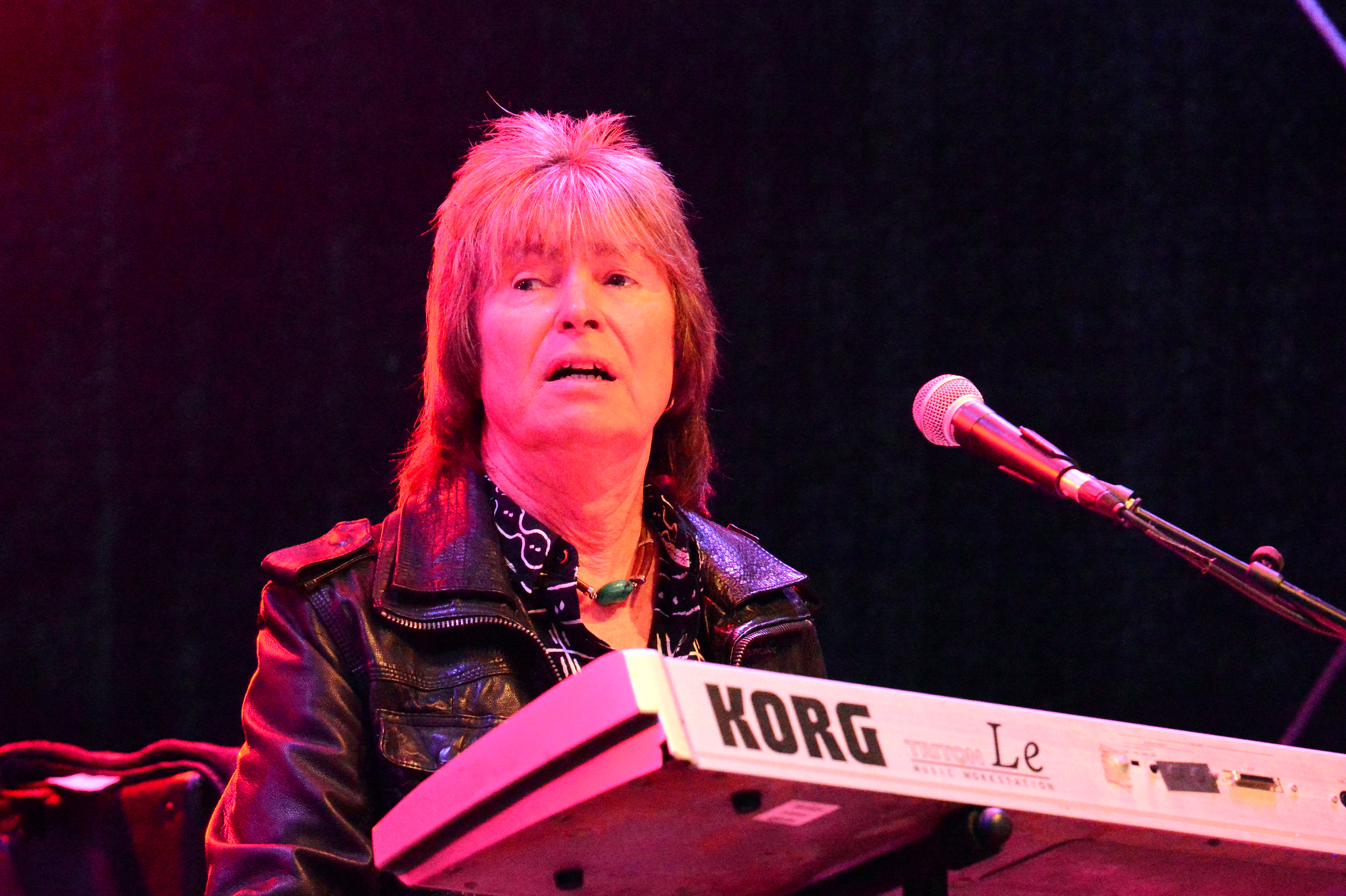
Keyboardist and rhythm guitarist Paul Raymond performed on six Savoy Brown studio albums during the 1970s.

After recording Lion's Share, Walker left Savoy Brown in September 1972 to join Fleetwood Mac. He was replaced by Jackie Lynton. Partway through the recording of their next album Jack the Toad, Bidwell was also replaced by the returning Ron Berg. This lineup completed the album's recording, and its subsequent promotional tour, before Simmonds decided to disband the group again. He rebuilt the group with Hemlock members Miller Anderson (lead vocals, rhythm guitar), Jim Leverton (bass, backing vocals) and Eric Dillon (drums), before former Chicken Shack frontman Stan Webb joined on guitar in January 1974 upon the breakup of his group. The new lineup released Boogie Brothers in April and toured until July, before splitting up and leaving Simmonds to rebuild the band yet again.

By late 1974, Simmonds had brought back keyboardist/guitarist Paul Raymond and drummer Dave Bidwell, as well as adding new lead vocalist Dave Tedstone. This lineup toured the UK and Germany in early 1975, before Tedstone was dismissed and not replaced – Simmonds took over on lead vocals for the first time in the band's history. Bidwell left for a second time during the recording of Wire Fire and was replaced for the rest of the sessions by Tom Farnell; the album was released in October and a tour followed until December, after which Rae was also replaced by Ian Ellis. Skin 'n' Bone followed in April 1976, after which Raymond left in July to join UFO. After Raymond's departure, with the band reduced to a trio, Simmonds decided to take a break and placed Savoy Brown on hiatus.

=== 1978–1992 ===
In early 1978, Savoy Brown returned with Kim Simmonds, Ian Ellis and Tom Farnell joined on tour by an unknown keyboardist; however, the new member was dismissed before the band recorded its next album Savage Return, which credited only the trio. Following the album's release and promotional tour, Simmons relocated to the United States in 1978; he toured during 1979 and 1980 with a lineup including drummer/vocalist Richie Carmichael and bassist Mike Gardner, who left suddenly to join Ted Nugent's band and was replaced with a bassist named Jim, then a bass player known only as "D.C." (Don Cook), before introducing a new lineup of vocalist Ralph Morman (formerly of the Joe Perry Project), guitarist Barry Paul, drummer Keith Boyce (both formerly of Heavy Metal Kids), and bassist John Humphrey in the summer of 1980. This incarnation issued Rock 'n' Roll Warrior and Greatest Hits Live in 1981, before breaking up at the end of the year.

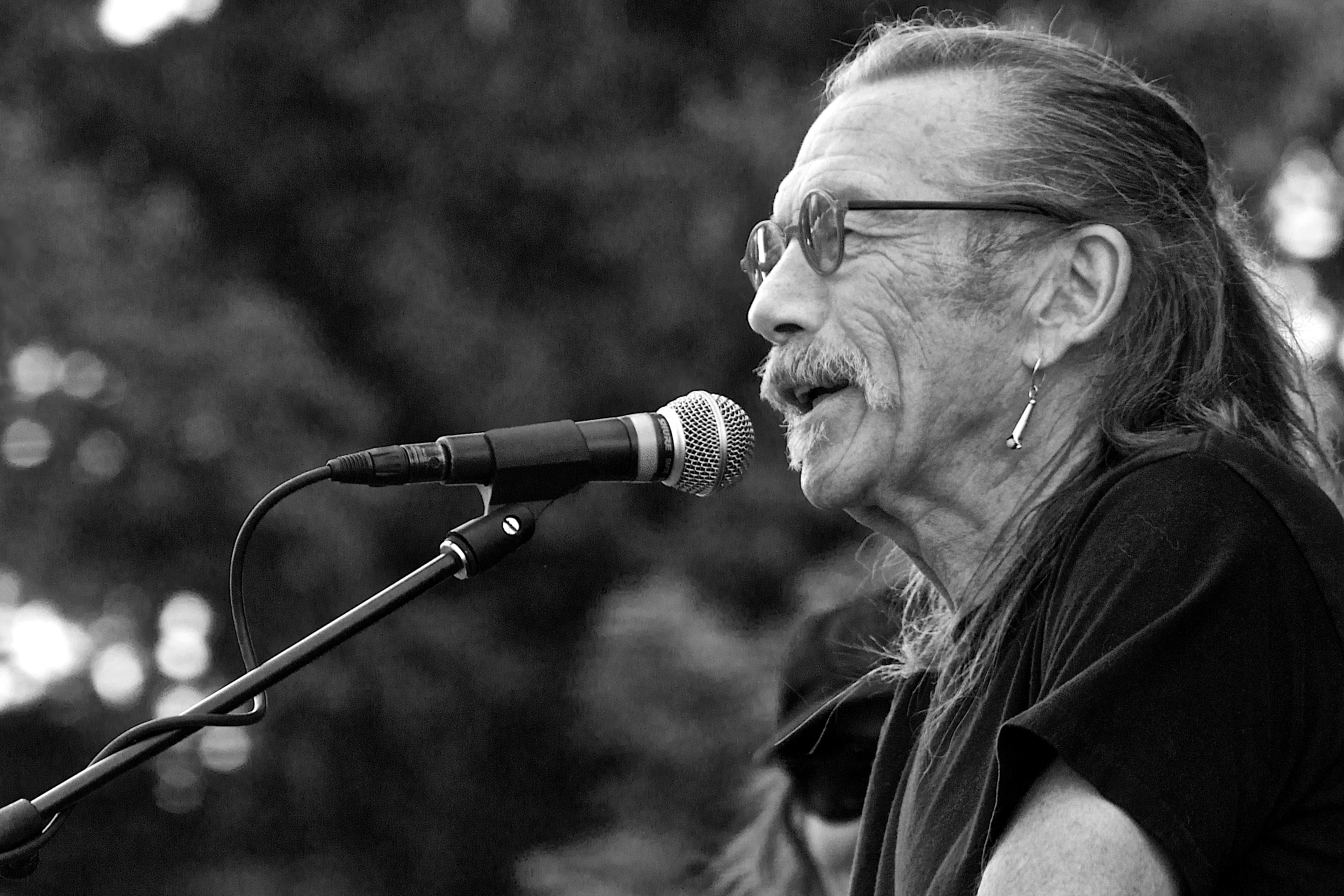
After a brief spell from 1971 to 1972, Dave Walker rejoined Savoy Brown in 1987 and remained for four years.

Savoy Brown was inactive for around two years, before returning in late 1983 with a lineup of Simmonds, vocalist/guitarist Andrew Gerome, bassist Stutz Bearcat and drummer Tommy Amato. The group continued touring during 1984, and was briefly renamed the Kim Simmonds Band. In 1985, Savoy Brown signed with Relix Records and introduced a new incarnation featuring vocalist/harmonica player Speedo Jones and bassist Chris Romanelli. Slow Train, a collection of acoustic recordings, was released in September 1986, shortly after which Simmonds introduced a new lineup with vocalist Jimmy Kunes, bassist Jim Dagnesi and drummer Al Macomber; early the next year, Kunes was replaced by a returning Dave Walker and Shmutza-Hideous joined on percussion (keyboards were handled by various guest performers).

Make Me Sweat was released in January 1988. Walker, Dagnesi and Macomber all remained for Kings of Boogie, issued in March 1989. For the album's tour, Simmonds and Walker were joined by bassist Lou Kaplan, drummer Pete Mendillo and keyboardist Rick Jewett, all members of roots rock band Mad Jack. Kaplan and Mendillo left in 1990 and were replaced by Loren Kraft and Steve Behrendt, respectively, while Jeff Adams joined on guitar. Walker left for a second time in September 1991. He was replaced by Pete McMahon and Phil McCormack. Around the same time, Andy Ramirez and Joe Pierleoni took over from Kraft and Behrendt.

=== 1992–2022 ===
Following the release of Let It Ride in 1992, Simmonds, McMahon, Ramirez and Pierleoni toured through to 1993. Jim Heyl and Dave Olson replaced Ramirez and Pierleoni for the 1994 album Bring It Home. During the second half of the 1990s, Savoy Brown was centred around Simmonds and bassist Nathaniel Peterson, both of whom shared lead vocal duties. The group went through a succession of drummers – first Al Cash, followed by T. Xiques and later Tom Compton. Following the album's release, Simmonds enlisted second guitarist David Malachowski (formerly of Shania Twain's band), bassist Gerry Sorrentino (formerly of Shemekia Copeland's band) and drummer Dennis Cotton (known for his work with Duke Robillard).

With Malachowski, Sorrentino and Cotton, Savoy Brown released studio album Strange Dreams in 2003 and live collection You Should Have Been There! in 2004. Malachowski left the band in 2005. Cotton followed later in the year and was replaced by Mario Staiano. This new trio issued Steel in 2007. In August 2009, Sorrentino was forced to leave the group due to illness, with Pat DeSalvo taking his place. Later in the year, Staiano was also replaced by Garnet Grimm, and Joe Whiting joined on lead vocals and saxophone. Voodoo Moon was released in 2011. Whiting left in late 2012. Simmonds returned to performing lead vocals, and since 2014 the group has released a slew of studio and live albums. Kim Simmonds died on 13 December 2022; the band disbanded shortly after his death.

== Members ==
=== Final lineup ===
Image	Name	Years active	Instruments	Release contributions
	Kim Simmonds	1965–2022 (until his death)	lead and rhythm guitars; harmonica; vocals (lead 1975–80, 1994–2009, 2012–2022); occasional keyboards and piano	all Savoy Brown releases
	Pat DeSalvo	2009–2022	bass guitar; backing vocals	all Savoy Brown releases from Voodoo Moon (2011) onwards
	Garnet Grimm	2009–2022	drums	all Savoy Brown releases from Voodoo Moon (2011) onwards

=== Former members ===
Image	Name	Years active	Instruments	Release contributions
	Leo Mannings	1965–1967	drums	"I Tried" (1966); Shake Down (1967)
	Ray Chappell	1965–1967 (died 2019)	bass guitar	"I Tried" (1966); Shake Down (1967)
	Brice Portius	1965–1967	lead vocals	"I Tried" (1966); Shake Down (1967)
	John O'Leary	1965–1967 (died 2024)	harmonica	"I Tried" (1966)
	Trevor Jeavons	1965	keyboards	none
	Bob Hall	1965–1970 (part-time: 1969–1970)	keyboards	all Savoy Brown releases from "I Tried" (1966) to A Step Further (1969)
	Martin Stone	1967 (died 2016)	rhythm and lead guitars	Shake Down (1967)
	Chris Youlden	1967–1970 (died 2025)	lead vocals; piano; rhythm guitar	all Savoy Brown releases from "Taste and Try, Before You Buy" (1967) to Raw Sienna (1970); Looking from the Outside: Live '69/'70 (2000)
	Bob Brunning	1967; 1968 (died 2011)	bass guitar	"Taste and Try, Before You Buy" (1967)
	Hughie Flint	1967	drums	"Taste and Try, Before You Buy" (1967)
	"Lonesome" Dave Peverett	1967–1970; 1992–1994 (died 2000)	rhythm guitar; backing vocals; lead vocals (1970)	all Savoy Brown releases from "Taste and Try, Before You Buy" (1967) to Looking In (1970); Just Live (1981); Bring It Home (1994) – one track; Looking from the Outside: Live '69/'70 (2000); Jack the Toad: Live '70/'72 (2000) – one track
	Rivers Jobe	1968 (died 1979)	bass guitar	"Walking by Myself" (1968); Getting to the Point (1968); Blue Matter (1969) – two tracks
	Bill Bruford	1968	drums	none
	Roger Earl	1968–1970	drums; percussion	all Savoy Brown releases from "Walking by Myself" (1968) to Looking In (1970); Just Live (1981); The Blues Keep Me Holding On (1999) – one track; Looking from the Outside: Live '69/'70 (2000); Jack the Toad: Live '70/'72 (2000) – one track
	Tony "Tone" Stevens	1968–1970	bass guitar; percussion (1968–1969)	all Savoy Brown releases from Blue Matter (1969) to Looking In (1970); Just Live (1981); Looking from the Outside: Live '69/'70 (2000); Jack the Toad: Live '70/'72 (2000) – one track
	Paul Raymond	1970–1973; 1974–1976 (died 2019)	keyboards; rhythm guitar; backing vocals	all Savoy Brown releases from Street Corner Talking (1971) to Skin 'n' Bone (1976), except Boogie Brothers (1974); Live in Central Park (1985); Live at the Record Plant (1998); Jack the Toad: Live '70/'72 (2000)
	Andy Pyle	1970–1971; 1972–1973	bass guitar	Lion's Share (1972); Jack the Toad (1973); Jack the Toad: Live '70/'72 (2000)
	Ron Berg	1970–1971; 1972–1973	drums	Jack the Toad (1973) – four tracks
	Pete Scott	1970–1971	lead vocals	none
	Dave Bidwell	1971–1972; 1974–1975 (died 1977)	drums; percussion	all Savoy Brown releases from Street Corner Talking (1971) to Wire Fire (1975), except Boogie Brothers (1974); Live in Central Park (1985); Jack the Toad: Live '70/'72 (2000)
	Dave Walker	1971–1972; 1987–1991	lead vocals	Street Corner Talking (1971); Hellbound Train (1972); Lion's Share (1972); Live in Central Park (1985); Make Me Sweat (1988); Kings of Boogie (1989); Live and Kickin' (1990); Jack the Toad: Live '70/'72 (2000) – two tracks
	Andy Silvester	1971–1972	bass guitar	Street Corner Talking (1971); Hellbound Train (1972); Live in Central Park (1985); Jack the Toad: Live '70/'72 (2000) – two tracks
	Jackie Lynton	1972–1973	lead vocals	Jack the Toad (1973); Jack the Toad: Live '70/'72 (2000)
	Miller Anderson	1973–1974	lead vocals; rhythm and lead guitar	Boogie Brothers (1974)
	Jim Leverton	1973–1974	bass guitar; backing vocals	Boogie Brothers (1974)
	Eric Dillon	1973–1974	drums	Boogie Brothers (1974)
	Stan Webb	1974	rhythm and lead guitar; backing and lead vocals	Boogie Brothers (1974)
	Andy Rae	1974–1975	bass guitar; backing vocals	Wire Fire (1975); Live at the Record Plant (1998)
	Tom Farnell	1975–1978	drums; percussion	Wire Fire (1975); Skin 'n' Bone (1976); Savage Return (1978); Live at the Record Plant (1998)
	Ian Ellis	1975–1978	bass guitar; backing vocals; lead vocals (died-2024) (1978)	Skin 'n' Bone (1976); Savage Return (1978)
	Richie Carmichael	1978–1980	drums; co-lead vocals	none
	Don "D.C." Cook	1978–1980	bass guitar	none
	Ralph Morman	1980–1981 (died 2014)	lead vocals	Rock 'n' Roll Warriors (1981); Greatest Hits Live (1981); The Bottom Line Encore Collection (1999)
	Barry Paul	1980–1981 (died 2019)	rhythm and lead guitars; backing vocals	Rock 'n' Roll Warriors (1981); Greatest Hits Live (1981); The Bottom Line Encore Collection (1999)
	John Humphrey	1980–1981	bass guitar; backing vocals	Rock 'n' Roll Warriors (1981); Greatest Hits Live (1981); The Bottom Line Encore Collection (1999)
	Keith Boyce	1980–1981	drums	Rock 'n' Roll Warriors (1981); Greatest Hits Live (1981); The Bottom Line Encore Collection (1999)
	Paul Goldwin	1982–1983	lead vocals	none
	Mark Boals	1982–1983	bass; backing vocals	none
	Matt Allen	1982–1983	drums; backing vocals	none
	Andy Gerome	1983–1984	lead vocals; rhythm and lead guitar	none
	Stutz Bearcat	1983–1984	bass guitar	none
	Tommy Amato	1983–1984	drums	none
	Speedo Jones	1985–1986	lead vocals; harmonica	Slow Train (1986)
	Chris Romanelli	1985–1986	bass guitar	Slow Train (1986)
	Jim Dagnesi	1986–1989	bass guitar	Make Me Sweat (1988); Kings of Boogie (1989)
	Al Macomber	1986–1989	drums; backing vocals	Make Me Sweat (1988); Kings of Boogie (1989)
	Shmutza-Hideous	1986–1988	percussion	Make Me Sweat (1988)
	Miffy Smith	1986–1988	keyboards	none
	Jimmy Kunes	1986–1987	lead vocals	none
	Rick Jewett	1989–1992	keyboards; backing vocals	Live and Kickin' (1990); Let It Ride (1992)
	Pete Mendillo	1989–1991 (died 2023)	drums	Live and Kickin' (1990)
	Lou Kaplan	1989–1990	bass guitar	Live and Kickin' (1990)
	Jeff Adams	1990–1991	rhythm guitar	none
	Loren Kraft	1990–1991	bass guitar	none
	Steve Behrendt	1990–1991	drums	none
	Pete McMahon	1991–1994	lead vocals; harmonica	Let It Ride (1992); Bring It Home (1994)
	Andy Ramirez	1991–1993	bass guitar; backing vocals	Let It Ride (1992)
	Joe Pierleoni	1991–1993	drums	Let It Ride (1992)
	Phil McCormack	1991–1992 (died 2019)	lead vocals	Let It Ride (1992) – two tracks only
	Jim Heyl	1993–1994	bass guitar	Bring It Home (1994)
	Dave Olson	1993–1994 (died 2016)	drums	Bring It Home (1994)
	Nathaniel Peterson	1994–1999	bass guitar; co-lead vocals	The Blues Keep Holding Me On (1999); Train to Nowhere (2010)
	Al Kash	1994–1997	drums	Train to Nowhere (2010)
	T. Xiques	1997–1998	drums	Train to Nowhere (2010) – three tracks
	Tom Compton	1998–1999	drums	The Blues Keep Holding Me On (1999)
	Gerry Sorrentino	1999–2009	bass guitar; backing vocals	Strange Dreams (2003); You Should Have Been There! (2004); Steel (2007)
	Dennis Cotton	1999–2005	drums; percussion	Strange Dreams (2003); You Should Have Been There! (2004); Steel (2007)
	David Malachowski	1999–2005 (died 2022)	rhythm guitar; backing vocals	Strange Dreams (2003); You Should Have Been There! (2004); Steel (2007) – two tracks
	Mario Staiano	2005–2009	drums; backing vocals	Steel (2007) – three tracks
	Joe Whiting	2009–2012	lead vocals; saxophone	Voodoo Moon (2011); Songs from the Road (2013)

== Lineups ==
Period	Members	Releases
February 24 – December 1965 (as the Savoy Brown Blues Band)	Brice Portius – lead vocals; Kim Simmonds – guitar, vocals; Ray Chappell – bass; Trevor Jeavons – keyboards; John O'Leary – harmonica; Leo Mannings – drums	none
December 1965 – February 1967 (as the Savoy Brown Blues Band)	Brice Portius – lead vocals; Kim Simmonds – guitar, vocals; Ray Chappell – bass; Bob Hall – piano; John O'Leary – harmonica; Leo Mannings – drums	"I Tried" (1966); "True Story" (1968)
February – June 1967 (as the Savoy Brown Blues Band)	Brice Portius – lead vocals; Kim Simmonds – lead guitar, vocals; Martin Stone – rhythm guitar; Ray Chappell – bass; Bob Hall – piano (part-time); John O'Leary – harmonica; Leo Mannings – drums	none
June – September 1967 (as the Savoy Brown Blues Band)	Brice Portius – lead vocals; Kim Simmonds – lead guitar, harmonica, vocals; Martin Stone – rhythm guitar; Ray Chappell – bass; Bob Hall – piano (part-time); Leo Mannings – drums	Shake Down (1967)
September – October 1967 (as the Savoy Brown Blues Band)	Chris Youlden – lead vocals, piano; Kim Simmonds – lead guitar, harmonica, vocals; Martin Stone – rhythm guitar; Ray Chappell – bass; Bob Hall – piano (part-time); Leo Mannings – drums	none
October 1967 (as the Savoy Brown Blues Band)	Chris Youlden – lead vocals, piano; Kim Simmonds – guitar, harmonica, vocals; Bob Brunning – bass; Bob Hall – piano (part-time); Leo Mannings – drums	none
October 1967 (as the Savoy Brown Blues Band)	Chris Youlden – lead vocals, piano; Kim Simmonds – guitar, harmonica, vocals; Bob Brunning – bass; Bob Hall – piano (part-time); Hughie Flint – drums	none
October – December 1967 (as the Savoy Brown Blues Band)	Chris Youlden – lead vocals, piano; Kim Simmonds – lead guitar, harmonica, vocals; Dave Peverett – rhythm guitar, vocals; Bob Brunning – bass; Bob Hall – piano (part-time); Hughie Flint – drums	"Taste and Try, Before You Buy" (1967)
January 1968 (as the Savoy Brown Blues Band)	Chris Youlden – lead vocals, piano; Kim Simmonds – lead guitar, harmonica, vocals; Dave Peverett – rhythm guitar, vocals; Rivers Jobe – bass; Bob Hall – piano (part-time); Bill Bruford – drums	none
January – November 1968	Chris Youlden – lead vocals, piano; Kim Simmonds – lead guitar, harmonica, vocals; Dave Peverett – rhythm guitar, vocals; Rivers Jobe – bass; Bob Hall – piano (part-time); Roger Earl – drums, percussion	"Walking by Myself" (1968); Getting to the Point (1968); Blue Matter (1969) – two tracks
November – December 1968	Chris Youlden – lead vocals, piano; Kim Simmonds – lead guitar, harmonica, vocals; Dave Peverett – rhythm guitar, vocals; Bob Brunning – bass; Bob Hall – piano (part-time); Roger Earl – drums, percussion	none
December 1968 – May 1970	Chris Youlden – lead vocals, piano; Kim Simmonds – lead guitar, harmonica, vocals; Dave Peverett – rhythm guitar, vocals; Tony Stevens – bass, percussion; Bob Hall – piano (part-time; touring only from late 1969); Roger Earl – drums, percussion	Blue Matter (1969) – remaining tracks; "Grits Ain't Groceries" (1969); A Step Further (1969); Raw Sienna (1970) – does not feature Hall; Looking from the Outside: Live '69/'70 (2000) – four tracks recorded at various shows in 1969
May – June 1970	Dave Peverett – lead vocals, rhythm guitar; Kim Simmonds – lead guitar, harmonica, vocals; Tony Stevens – bass, percussion; Bob Hall – piano (part-time; touring only); Roger Earl – drums, percussion	none
June – December 1970	Dave Peverett – lead vocals, rhythm guitar; Kim Simmonds – lead guitar, harmonica, vocals; Tony Stevens – bass, percussion; Roger Earl – drums, percussion	Looking In (1970); Looking from the Outside: Live '69/'70 (2000) – six tracks recorded at various shows in 1970; Jack the Toad: Live '70/'72 (2000) – one tracks recorded live in November 1970; Just Live (1982)
December 1970 – May 1971	Pete Scott – lead vocals; Kim Simmonds – lead guitar, harmonica, vocals; Andy Pyle – bass; Paul Raymond – keyboards, guitar, vocals; Ron Berg – drums	none
May 1971 – June 1972	Dave Walker – lead vocals; Kim Simmonds – lead guitar, harmonica, vocals; Andy Silvester – bass; Paul Raymond – keyboards, guitar, vocals; Dave Bidwell – drums, percussion	Street Corner Talking (1971); Hellbound Train (1972); Live in Central Park (1985); Jack the Toad: Live '70/'72 (2000) – two tracks recorded live in March 1972
June – September 1972	Dave Walker – lead vocals; Kim Simmonds – lead guitar, harmonica, vocals; Andy Pyle – bass; Paul Raymond – keyboards, guitar, vocals; Dave Bidwell – drums, percussion	Lion's Share (1972)
September – late 1972	Jackie Lynton – lead vocals; Kim Simmonds – lead guitar, harmonica, vocals; Andy Pyle – bass; Paul Raymond – keyboards, guitar, vocals; Dave Bidwell – drums, percussion	Jack the Toad (1973) – five tracks; Jack the Toad: Live '70/'72 (2000) – seven tracks recorded live in October 1972
Late 1972 – late 1973	Jackie Lynton – lead vocals; Kim Simmonds – lead guitar, harmonica, vocals; Andy Pyle – bass; Paul Raymond – keyboards, guitar, vocals; Ron Berg – drums	Jack the Toad (1973) – four tracks
Late 1973 – January 1974	Miller Anderson – lead vocals, rhythm guitar; Kim Simmonds – lead guitar, harmonica, vocals; Jim Leverton – bass, backing vocals; Eric Dillon – drums	none
January – summer 1974	Miller Anderson – lead vocals, rhythm guitar; Kim Simmonds – lead guitar, harmonica, vocals; Stan Webb – rhythm guitar; Jim Leverton – bass, backing vocals; Eric Dillon – drums	Boogie Brothers (1974)
Late 1974 – February 1975	Dave Tedstone – lead vocals; Kim Simmonds – lead guitar, harmonica, vocals; Andy Rae – bass, backing vocals; Paul Raymond – keyboards, guitar, vocals; Dave Bidwell – drums, percussion	none
February – summer 1975	Kim Simmonds – lead vocals, lead guitar; Andy Rae – bass, backing vocals; Paul Raymond – keyboards, guitar, vocals; Dave Bidwell – drums, percussion	Wire Fire (1975) – select tracks
Summer – December 1975	Kim Simmonds – lead vocals, lead guitar, harmonica; Andy Rae – bass, backing vocals; Paul Raymond – keyboards, guitar, vocals; Tom Farnell – drums, percussion	Wire Fire (1975) – select tracks; Live at the Record Plant (1998)
December 1975 – July 1976	Kim Simmonds – lead vocals, lead guitar, harmonica; Ian Ellis – bass, backing vocals; Paul Raymond – keyboards, guitar, vocals; Tom Farnell – drums, percussion	Skin 'n' Bone (1976)
Band on hiatus July 1976 – early 1978
Early – late 1978	Kim Simmonds – guitar; Ian Ellis – bass, lead vocals; Tom Farnell – drums, percussion	Savage Return (1978)
Early 1979 – summer 1980	Kim Simmonds – guitar, harmonica, vocals; Richie Carmichael – drums, vocals; "D.C." – bass	none
Summer 1980 – late 1981	Ralph Morman – lead vocals; Kim Simmonds – guitar, harmonica, vocals; Barry Paul – guitar, backing vocals; John Humphrey – bass, backing vocals; Keith Boyce – drums	Rock 'n' Roll Warriors (1981); Greatest Hits Live (1981); The Bottom Line Encore Collection (1999)
Band inactive late 1981 – late 1983
Late 1983 – late 1984 (as the Kim Simmonds Band during 1984)	Andrew Jerome – lead vocals, rhythm guitar; Kim Simmonds – lead guitar, harmonica, vocals; Stutz Bearcat – bass; Tommy Amato – drums	none
Band inactive late 1984 – late 1985
Late 1985 – October 1986	Speedo Jones – lead vocals, harmonica; Kim Simmonds – guitar, harmonica, vocals; Chris Romanelli – bass	Slow Train (1986)
October 1986 – January 1987	Jimmy Kunes – lead vocals; Kim Simmonds – guitar, harmonica, vocals; Jim Dagnesi – bass, backing vocals; Al Macomber – drums, backing vocals; Shmutza-Hideous – percussion	none
January 1987 – 1988	Dave Walker – lead vocals; Kim Simmonds – guitar, harmonica, vocals; Jim Dagnesi – bass, backing vocals; Al Macomber – drums, backing vocals; Shmutza-Hideous – percussion	Make Me Sweat (1988)
1988–1989	Dave Walker – lead vocals; Kim Simmonds – guitar, harmonica, vocals; Jim Dagnesi – bass, backing vocals; Al Macomber – drums, backing vocals	Kings of Boogie (1989)
1989–1990	Dave Walker – lead vocals; Kim Simmonds – guitar, harmonica, vocals; Lou Kaplan – bass; Rick Jewett – keyboards, backing vocals; Pete Mendillo – drums	Live and Kickin' (1990)
1990–1991	Dave Walker – lead vocals; Kim Simmonds – guitar, harmonica, vocals; Jeff Adams – guitar; Loren Kraft – bass; Rick Jewett – keyboards, backing vocals; Steve Behrendt – drums	none
1991–1992	Pete McMahon – vocals, harmonica; Phil McCormack – vocals; Kim Simmonds – guitar, harmonica, vocals; Andy Ramirez – bass, backing vocals; Rick Jewett – keyboards, backing vocals; Joe Pierleoni – drums	Let It Ride (1992) – two tracks
1992	Pete McMahon – lead vocals, harmonica; Kim Simmonds – guitar, harmonica, vocals; Andy Ramirez – bass, backing vocals; Rick Jewett – keyboards, backing vocals; Joe Pierleoni – drums	Let It Ride (1992) – remaining tracks
1992–1993	Pete McMahon – lead vocals, harmonica; Kim Simmonds – guitar, harmonica, vocals; Andy Ramirez – bass, backing vocals; Joe Pierleoni – drums	none
1993–1994	Pete McMahon – lead vocals, harmonica; Kim Simmonds – guitar, harmonica, vocals; Jim Heyl – bass; David Olson – drums	Bring It Home (1994)
1994 – late 1997	Kim Simmonds – guitar, harmonica, vocals; Nathaniel Peterson – bass, vocals; Al Cash – drums	Train to Nowhere (2010) – nine tracks
Late 1997 – late 1998	Kim Simmonds – guitar, harmonica, vocals; Nathaniel Peterson – bass, vocals; T. Xiques – drums	Train to Nowhere (2010) – three tracks
Late 1998 – late 1999	Kim Simmonds – guitar, harmonica, vocals; Nathaniel Peterson – bass, vocals; Tom Compton – drums	The Blues Keep Holding Me On (1999)
Late 1999 – 2005	Kim Simmonds – lead vocals, guitar, harmonica; David Malachowski – guitar, backing vocals; Gerry Sorrentino – bass; Dennis Cotton – drums, percussion	Strange Dreams (2003); You Should Have Been There! (2004); Steel (2007) – two tracks
2005	Kim Simmonds – lead vocals, guitar, harmonica; Gerry Sorrentino – bass, backing vocals; Dennis Cotton – drums, percussion	Steel (2007) – seven tracks
Late 2005 – August 2009	Kim Simmonds – lead vocals, guitar, harmonica; Gerry Sorrentino – bass, backing vocals; Mario Staiano – drums, backing vocals	Steel (2007) – remaining three tracks
August – November 2009	Kim Simmonds – lead vocals, guitar, harmonica; Pat DeSalvo – bass, backing vocals; Mario Staiano – drums, backing vocals	none
November 2009 – Late 2012	Joe Whiting – lead vocals, saxophone; Kim Simmonds – guitar, harmonica, vocals; Pat DeSalvo – bass, backing vocals; Garnett Grimm – drums	Voodoo Moon (2011); Songs from the Road (2013)
Late 2012 – December 2022	Kim Simmonds – lead vocals, guitar, harmonica; Pat DeSalvo – bass, backing vocals; Garnett Grimm – drums	Goin' to the Delta (2014); The Devil to Pay (2015); Still Live After 50 Years, Vol. 1 (2017); Witchy Feelin' (2017); City Night (2019); Still Live After 50 Years, Vol. 2 (2019); Ain't Done Yet (2020); Blues All Around (2023)
