= Great White (album) =

Studio album by Great White
- Released: February 17, 1984
- Studio: Total Access Recording (Redondo Beach, California)
- Genre: Heavy metal
- Length: 38:22
- Label: EMI America
- Producer: Michael Wagener

Great White chronology
Out of the Night (1983)	Great White (1984)	Shot in the Dark (1986)

Singles from Great White
- 1. "Out of the Night" Released: March 31, 1984; 2. "Stick It" Released: 1984; 3. "Substitute / No Better Than Hell" Released: 1984

Stick It album cover

Professional ratings
Review scores
Source	Rating
AllMusic	3/5 stars
Collector's Guide to Heavy Metal	7/10
Kerrang!	(favorable)

Great White is the debut full-length album by the American rock band Great White. Three tracks are taken from the band's previous EP, albeit in re-recorded versions. The musical style of this album is very different from the following highly successful releases of Great White, as they display here a more hard-driving metal sound as opposed to their later, blues-infused rock sound. EMI America judged the album a disaster and Great White was dropped. This led to a rethink by the band, and they became less heavy, introducing a tamer hard rock sound for later albums.

The CD reissue of 1999, done under the name Stick It by the French label Axe Killer, features five bonus tracks.

== Track listing ==
Side one

1. "Out of the Night" (Mark Kendall, Jack Russell, Gary Holland, Lorne Black) – 2:56
2. "Stick It" (Kendall, Russell, Holland, Black, Alan Niven) – 3:56
3. "Substitute" (Pete Townshend) – 4:20
4. "Bad Boys" (Kendall, Russell, Holland, Black, Niven) – 4:18
5. "On Your Knees" (Kendall, Russell, Holland, Black, Don Dokken) – 3:50

Side two

6. "Streetkiller" (Kendall, Russell, Holland, Black) – 3:57
7. "No Better Than Hell" (Kendall, Russell, Holland, Black, Michael Wagener) – 4:06
8. "Hold On" (Kendall, Russell, Holland, Black) – 4:13
9. "Nightmares" (Kendall, Russell, Holland, Black, Niven) – 3:18
10. "Dead End" (Kendall, Russell, Holland, Black) – 3:33

=== Stick It 1999 CD reissue bonus tracks ===
11. "Down at the Doctor" (Mickey Jupp) – 3:40 (Dr. Feelgood cover)
12. "Train to Nowhere" (Kim Simmonds, Chris Youlden) – 4:27 (Savoy Brown cover)
13. "The Hunter" (Carl Wells, Donald "Duck" Dunn, Steve Cropper, Al Jackson, Jr., Booker T. Jones) – 4:12 (Albert King cover)
14. "Red House" (Jimi Hendrix) – 8:46 (Jimi Hendrix cover)
15. "Rock 'n' Roll" (Jimmy Page, Robert Plant, John Paul Jones, John Bonham) – 3:44 (Led Zeppelin cover)

== Personnel ==
=== Great White ===
- Jack Russell – lead and backing vocals
- Mark Kendall – guitar, backing vocals
- Lorne Black – bass, backing vocals
- Gary Holland – drums, backing vocals

=== Additional musicians ===
- Alan Niven – backing vocals, management
- Gary Gersh, Mark Wesley, Phylis Koch, Tom The Razzman – backing vocals
- Michael Lardie – backing vocals, assistant engineer

=== Production ===
- Michael Wagener – producer, engineer, mixing
- Wyn Davis – assistant engineer
- Greg Fulginti – mastering

== Charts ==
Chart (1984)	Peak position
US Billboard 200	144
