= Shake 'Em On Down =

1937 song by Bukka White

"Shake 'Em on Down"

Single by Bukka White
- A-side: "Pinebluff, Arkansas"
- Released: 1937
- Recorded: Chicago, September 2, 1937
- Genre: Blues
- Length: 2:59
- Label: Vocalion
- Songwriter: Booker T. Washington White a.k.a. Bukka White
- Producer: Lester Melrose

"Shake 'Em On Down" is a Delta blues song by American musician Bukka White. He recorded it in Chicago in September 1937, two months before being incarcerated at the infamous Parchman Farm in his native Mississippi.

It was his first recording for producer Lester Melrose and remains his best-known song. Several artists, in both blues and other genres, have adapted the song, often with variations on the lyrics and music. The English rock group Led Zeppelin adapted some of the lyrics for two of their songs.

== Background ==
After several attempts at recording for Victor Records and Okeh Records in the early 1930s, Bukka White came to the attention of Vocalion Records' producer Lester Melrose. Melrose arranged for White to record a single in Chicago in September 1937 and he recorded two songs – "Shake 'Em On Down" and "Pinebluff, Arkansas". Back home in Aberdeen, Mississippi, in October, he was arrested and charged with murder over shooting a man in the thigh. He was tried on 8 November, convicted of murder and sentenced to life imprisonment, to be served in the Mississippi State Penitentiary, commonly known as Parchman Farm.

== Original song ==
"Shake 'Em On Down" was recorded September 2, 1937, by White on vocal and guitar with an unidentified second guitarist. The song is a moderate-tempo twelve-bar blues notated in 4/4 time in the key of E. Music writer Mark Humphrey has described the rhythm as "shuffling" and its lyrics as "risqué":

Get your nightcap mama, and your gown
Baby 'fore day we gonna shake 'em on down
Hey done stopped hollerin', oh, must I shake 'em on down
I done stopped hollerin' now, must I shake 'em on down

The phrase "shake 'em on down" may have originated in White's claim that he extorted money from hobos when he was freighthopping trains in the early 1930s.

The song became a best seller, and blues historian Ted Gioia notes that his single "earned White the status of a celebrity within Parchman". Prior to his arrival at the Farm, the inmates and even guards contributed to the purchase of a guitar. White was largely exempt from the hardest work details and, in the evenings, spent a lot of time practicing. He often performed, sometimes with a small combo, including for the governor at the time, Hugh L. White – "When White performed for the governor of Mississippi, on the latter's visit to Parchman, he was surprised that the politician already knew about him", according to Gioia. Bukka White recalled Governor White asking him:

"Are you Booker T. Washington White? You don't know how many people down here trying to get you turned loose. But your sergeant and captain say, 'Don't turn him loose, he do too much good here.'" So I got to keep it up for two years.

Largely on the strength of "Shake 'Em On Down", when White was released from prison, he was able to resume his recording career with Melrose and Vocalion, despite the shift in public taste that had taken place in the previous two-and-a-half years.

== Renditions by other artists ==
Following Bukka White's success, "Shake 'Em On Down" was recorded by several bluesmen. Some used White's title or a variation, such as "Ride 'Em On Down", "Break 'Em On Down", or "Truck 'Em On Down". Big Bill Broonzy recorded a similar version in 1938, whose popularity surpassed the original.

The song entered the folk tradition and became popular in the northern Mississippi hills, played by musicians like Fred McDowell, Compton Jones, and Ranie Burnette. Unlike in White's original version, hills musicians typically use slide guitar.

In 1967, the Savoy Brown Blues Band recorded their own version of the song, featured on their debut album Shake Down. This version of the song also features slide guitar (in the verses only), and eventually goes into a psychedelic-style instrumental jam by guitarists Martin Stone and Kim Simmonds.

In 1970, Led Zeppelin recorded "Hats Off to (Roy) Harper" for their third album. Inspired by White's song, the liner notes credit the song to "Traditional, arranged by Charles Obscure" (a pseudonym of Jimmy Page) and uses some similar lyrics:

Listen mama, Put on your mornin' gown'
Put in your nightshirt Mama we gonna shake 'em down yeah, yeah?
Must I holler
Must I, must I, must I shake 'em on down?
Well I've been mistreated babe
I believe I'll shake 'em on down

Biographer Martin Popoff noted that Robert Plant's vocal was recorded using an instrument amplifier with a vibrato effect, with Page providing a "buzzing bottleneck acoustic slide just as aggressively as Robert sings". Led Zeppelin's song "Custard Pie" (from 1975's Physical Graffiti) also borrows from "Shake 'Em On Down":

Put on your night shirt and your morning gown
You know by night I'm gonna shake 'em down
Put on your night shirt mama, and your morning gown
Well, you know by night I'm gonna shake 'em down
