= Raw sienna =

Raw sienna may refer to:

- Raw sienna (color), a natural yellow-brown pigment
- Raw Sienna (album), a 1970 album by Savoy Brown
