= Shake Down (album) =

Studio album by Savoy Brown
- Released: September 1967
- Recorded: Mid-1967
- Studio: Decca Studios, West Hampstead, North West London
- Genre: Blues rock; psychedelic rock; British blues
- Length: 39:53
- Label: Decca
- Producer: Mike Vernon

Savoy Brown chronology
Shake Down (1967)	Getting to the Point (1968)

Singles from Shake Down
- 1. "Shake 'Em On Down" Released: October 1968 (US only)

Professional ratings
Review scores
Source	Rating
Allmusic	3/5 stars

Shake Down is the debut studio album by English blues rock band Savoy Brown. It was released in 1967 (on Decca SKL 4883) under the name of Savoy Brown Blues Band and is mainly an album of covers, featuring three songs penned by blues singer Willie Dixon. In addition to Dixon, the band covers John Lee Hooker and B.B. King. The album was not originally issued in the US, but was available as an import, until released on CD in 1990.

== Track listing ==
1. "I Ain't Superstitious" (Willie Dixon) – 3:25
2. "Let Me Love You Baby" (Dixon) – 3:00
3. "Black Night" (Jessie Mae Robinson) – 4:47
4. "High Rise" (Beverly Bridge, Sonny Thompson, Freddie King) – 2:44
5. "Rock Me Baby" (B.B. King, Joe Josea) – 2:56
6. "I Smell Trouble" (Deadric Malone) – 4:28
7. "Oh! Pretty Woman" (Albert King) – 2:28
8. "Little Girl" (Dixon) – 1:38 (credited incorrectly to Willie Dixon; written in 1954 by Chester Burnett as "I Have a Little Girl")
9. "The Doormouse Rides the Rails" (Martin Stone) – 3:32
10. "It's My Own Fault" (John Lee Hooker) – 4:55 (listed incorrectly on label as "It's All My Fault"; corrected on sleeve as "It's My Own Fault")
11. "Shake 'Em On Down" (Traditional, arranged by Bob Hall and Savoy Brown) – 6:00

== Personnel ==
Savoy Brown

- Brice Portius – vocals
- Kim Simmonds – lead and rhythm guitar
- Martin Stone – lead and rhythm guitar
- Ray Chappell – bass guitar
- Leo Mannings – drums, percussion
- Bob Hall – piano on "I Ain't Superstitious", "Little Girl" and "Shake 'Em On Down"

Technical

- Mike Vernon – producer
- Gus Dudgeon – recording engineer
- Guy Fletcher – mastering engineer
- Neil Slaven – liner notes
