= Looking In =

Studio album by Savoy Brown
- Released: October 1970 (US/Canada) / November 1970 (UK)
- Recorded: 1970
- Studios: Recorded Sound Studios, Bryanston Street, Marble Arch, London
- Genre: Blues rock
- Length: 39:06
- Labels: Decca Records (UK) / Parrot Records (US/Canada) (original LP); Deram (CD release)
- Producer: Kim Simmonds

Savoy Brown chronology
Raw Sienna (1970)	Looking In (1970)	Street Corner Talking (1971)

Singles from Looking In
- 1. "Poor Girl" Released: 6 November 1970 (UK) December 1970(US); 2. "Sitting An' Thinking" Released: March 1971 (US only)

Professional ratings
Review scores
Source	Rating
Allmusic	4/5 stars

Looking In is the sixth album by English blues rock band Savoy Brown. The album featured "Lonesome" Dave Peverett on vocals, after Chris Youlden left the band the previous spring. Leader/guitarist Kim Simmonds would be the only band member to continue with the band after this album, as all other band members left to form Foghat the following year.

It was released by Decca in 1970 (SKL 5066). For release in the United States and Canada, tapes were leased to Parrot Records (PAS 71042).

The album spent a week on the United Kingdom Official Charts and reached number 50. It did considerably better in the U.S. where it spent 19 weeks on the Billboard 200, peaking at number 39, their second-highest charting U.S. album.

== Track listing ==
Side one

1. "Gypsy" (Kim Simmonds) – 0:57
2. "Poor Girl" (Tony Stevens) – 4:04
3. "Money Can't Save Your Soul" (Dave Peverett, Simmonds) – 5:34
4. "Sunday Night" (Simmonds) – 5:23
5. "Looking In" (Peverett, Simmonds) – 5:17

Side two

1. "Take It Easy" (Peverett, Simmonds) – 5:47 (not 3:40 as printed on album)
2. "Sitting an' Thinking" (Simmonds) – 2:40
3. "Leavin' Again" (Peverett, Simmonds) – 8:29
4. "Romanoff" (Simmonds) – 1:01

== Personnel ==
Savoy Brown

- Kim Simmonds – lead guitar, piano
- Lonesome Dave – vocals, guitar
- Roger Earl – drums
- Tone Stevens – bass

Additional musicians

- Owen Finnegan – congas on some tracks

Technical

- Kim Simmonds – producer
- Savoy Brown – arrangements
- Paul Tregurtha – engineer
- Eric Holand – engineer
- Harry Fisher – mastering
- Anthony Hawkins – 1990 CD remastering
- David Anstey, Jim Baikie – artwork

== Charts ==
Chart (1970)	Peak position
Australian Albums (Kent Music Report)	25
Canada Top Albums/CDs (RPM)	58
UK Albums (Official Charts)	50
US Billboard 200	39
