= Hellbound Train =

Studio album by Savoy Brown
- Released: 18 February 1972
- Recorded: 1972
- Studios: Trident, London
- Genre: Blues
- Length: 33:38
- Labels: Decca (UK) / Parrot (US/Canada) (original LP); Deram (CD release)
- Producer: Neil Slaven

Savoy Brown chronology
| Street Corner Talking (1971) | Hellbound Train (1972) | Lion's Share (1972) |

Professional ratings
Review scores
| Source | Rating |
|---|---|
| AllMusic | 3/5 stars |
| Christgau's Record Guide | B− |

Hellbound Train is the eighth album by the English blues rock band Savoy Brown. It was recorded at Trident Studios, London, and was released by Parrot in 1972.

Hellbound Train was the group's most successful album in the US, peaking at number 34 on the Billboard 200.

== Background ==
Hellbound Train was recorded at Trident Studios, London, in 1972, and featured the same line-up that had recorded Street Corner Talking the previous year. The album was produced by Neil Slaven (credited as producing "for Gruggy Woof") and engineered by Roy Thomas Baker, who would later achieve broader fame as the producer for Queen, the Cars, Cheap Trick and Devo. The album was released in the United Kingdom on Decca Records on 18 February 1972, and in the United States and Canada on Parrot Records in March 1972. The original LP was issued in a gatefold sleeve featuring a comic strip illustrated by sleeve designer David Anstey.

== Music and style ==
The album showcases Savoy Brown's blues rock sound across seven tracks, with songwriting credits shared primarily between Simmonds and Silvester, and keyboardist Paul Raymond contributing one sole composition and one co-write.

The nine-minute title track "Hellbound Train," co-written by Simmonds and Silvester, is the album's centre-piece and was the song that received the most radio airplay. The track builds slowly, cycling through multiple blues and rock idioms and giving each band member space to contribute, before arriving at its abrupt ending—a deliberate production choice on the US LP pressing, where the track cuts off sharply as the needle reaches the run-off groove, creating a sense of dramatic finality. This ending was retained on the BGO CD reissue, which paired the album with Street Corner Talking on a single disc, but was replaced with a fade-out on the Deram US CD release.

"Troubled by these Days and Times," composed solely by Paul Raymond and featuring his piano playing, was among the stand-out tracks. Raymond would go on to join UFO after leaving Savoy Brown, while Dave Walker would briefly join Fleetwood Mac. The title track was later covered by Love and Rockets, who reworked it under the title "Bound for Hell."

== Critical reception ==
Hellbound Train was Savoy Brown's most commercially successful album, reaching number 34 on the Billboard 200 in the United States and number 40 on the RPM Top Albums chart in Canada.

Critical reception was mixed. AllMusic noted that while the album retained Savoy Brown's sleek, bluesy feel, the deep-rooted blues essence of Street Corner Talking did not rise as consistently throughout the record. The title track was identified as the clear stand-out, with Walker, Simmonds, and Raymond performing at their tightest, and Andy Silvester's bass playing described as the album's most complementary asset. Tracks such as "Lost and Lonely Child," "Doin' Fine," and "If I Could See an End" were considered more average blues efforts by comparison.

Robert Christgau awarded the album a B− in Christgau's Record Guide: Rock Albums of the Seventies (1981), writing that the album represented a competent but uneven entry in Savoy Brown's catalogue.

Despite the mixed critical response, the album's commercial performance in North America—driven by the band's relentless touring schedule—cemented it as the commercial high point of Savoy Brown's career.

== Track listing ==
1. "Doin' Fine" (Andy Silvester, Kim Simmonds) – 2:46
2. "Lost and Lonely Child" (Simmonds) – 6:00
3. "I'll Make Everything Alright" (Simmonds) – 3:18
4. "Troubled by these Days and Times" (Paul Raymond) – 5:43
5. "If I Could See an End" (Raymond, Simmonds) – 2:54
6. "It'll Make You Happy" (Simmonds) – 3:26
7. "Hellbound Train" (Silvester, Simmonds) – 9:07

On the US vinyl LP, the title track on Side 2 ends abruptly as the needle enters the runoff groove. On the Deram US CD, the song fades out. The abrupt ending was restored on the BGO CD release, pairing this album with Street Corner Talking on a single CD.

== Personnel ==
Savoy Brown

- Kim Simmonds – guitar, harmonica, vocals
- Paul Raymond – guitar, keyboards, vocals
- Andy Silvester – bass
- Dave Walker – vocals
- Dave Bidwell – drums

Additional

- Neil Slaven – producer (for Gruggy Woof)
- Roy Thomas Baker – engineer
- David Anstey – artwork (cover painting and b&w gatefold comic strip)

== Charts ==
| Chart (1972) | Peak position |
|---|---|
| Canada Top Albums/CDs (RPM) | 40 |
| US Billboard 200 | 34 |
