= Getting to the Point (album) =

Studio album by Savoy Brown
- Released: July 1968 (UK) / September 1968 (US/Canada)
- Recorded: March 1968
- Studio: Decca Studios, West Hampstead, North West London
- Genre: Blues rock
- Length: 51:01
- Label: Decca Records (UK) / Parrot Records (US/Canada) (original LP); Deram (CD release)
- Producer: Mike Vernon

Savoy Brown chronology
Shake Down (1967)	Getting to the Point (1968)	Blue Matter (1969)

Professional ratings
Review scores
Source	Rating
Allmusic	3/5 stars
Rolling Stone	(positive)

Getting to the Point is the second studio album by English blues rock band Savoy Brown. It marks the debut of a vastly different lineup, still led by Kim Simmonds but fronted by new vocalist Chris Youlden.

It was released by Decca in 1968 with catalog number SKL 4935 and finds the group taking on more of the songwriting load, as opposed to their debut, which consisted mostly of covers. One of the covers is "You Need Love" by Willie Dixon, which served as a blueprint for "Whole Lotta Love" by Led Zeppelin. Deram released the cd with three bonus tracks in 1990 with catalog number 820 922–2.

== Track listing ==
1. "Flood in Houston" (Kim Simmonds, Chris Youlden) – 4:00
2. "Stay with Me Baby" (Kim Simmonds, Chris Youlden, "Lonesome" Dave Peverett) – 2:35
3. "Honey Bee" (Muddy Waters) – 6:25
4. "The Incredible Gnome Meets Jaxman" (Simmonds) – 3:30
5. "Give Me a Penny" (Traditional; arranged by Simmonds and Youlden) – 4:20
6. "Mr. Downchild" (Simmonds, Youlden) – 5:25
7. "Getting to the Point" (Simmonds) – 4:20
8. "Big City Lights" (Bob Hall, Youlden) – 3:25
9. "You Need Love" (Willie Dixon) – 7:40

Bonus tracks on 1990 CD release

10. "Walking by Myself" (Jimmy Rogers) – 2:25 (originally A-side of Decca F 12797)
11. "Taste and Try, Before You Buy" (Youlden) – 2:21 (originally A-side of Decca F 12702)
12. "Someday People" (Simmonds) – 4:35 (originally B-side of Decca F 12702)

== Personnel ==
Savoy Brown

- Chris Youlden – vocals
- Bob Hall – piano
- Kim Simmonds – lead guitar
- Dave Peverett – rhythm guitar
- Rivers Jobe – bass guitar (except on tracks 11 and 12)
- Roger Earl – drums (except on tracks 11 and 12)
- Bob Brunning – bass guitar (on tracks 11 and 12)
- Hughie Flint – drums (on tracks 11 and 12)

Technical

- Mike Vernon – producer
- Roy Thomas Baker – recording engineer
- Harry Fisher – mastering engineer
- Neil Slaven – liner notes
