= Street Corner Talking =

Studio album by Savoy Brown
- Released: September 1971 (UK)
- Recorded: 1971
- Studios: Olympic, London
- Genre: Blues rock
- Length: 42:41
- Labels: Decca (UK) / Parrot (US/Canada) (original LP); Deram (CD release)
- Producer: Neil Slaven

Savoy Brown chronology
Looking In (1970)	Street Corner Talking (1971)	Hellbound Train (1972)

Singles from Street Corner Talking
- 1. "Tell Mama" Released: October 1971

Professional ratings
Review scores
Source	Rating
AllMusic	4/5 stars

Street Corner Talking is the seventh studio album by English blues rock band Savoy Brown. Released by Parrot Records in 1971 (PAS 71047), it was the first album released after the departure of guitarist Lonesome Dave, drummer Roger Earl, and bassist Tony Stevens, who all went on to form the more successful rock band Foghat. This left Kim Simmonds as the only remaining member. Simmonds recruited a new line-up of members, predominantly members of the previous line-up of the blues band Chicken Shack, which had undergone a seismic change in membership similar to that which had affected Savoy Brown, which, in turn, ushered in a new sound for the band.

== Track listing ==
Side one

1. "Tell Mama" (Paul Raymond, Kim Simmonds) – 5:15
2. "I Can't Get Next To You" (Barrett Strong, Norman Whitfield) – 6:35
3. "Let It Rock" (Raymond, Simmonds) – 3:07
4. "Time Does Tell" (Simmonds) – 5:29

Side two

1. "Street Corner Talking" (Simmonds) – 4:00
2. "All I Can Do" (Raymond, Simmonds) – 10:54
3. "Wang Dang Doodle" (Willie Dixon) – 7:15

Bonus track on 1991 CD reissue

"Tell Mama" (Raymond, Simmonds) – 3:07 (single version)

== Personnel ==
Savoy Brown

- Dave Walker – vocals
- Kim Simmonds – lead guitar
- Paul Raymond – keyboards; guitar (track 1); vocals (track 3)
- Andy Silvester – bass guitar
- Dave Bidwell – drums

Production

- Neil Slaven – producer
- George Chkiantz – engineer
- Rod Thear – assistant engineer
- Sam Feldman – mastering (side two of original issue)
- Anthony Hawkins – remastering (1991 CD)
- John Tracy – liner notes, coordination, compilation, research (CD)
- David Anstey – cover illustration

== Charts ==
Chart (1971)	Peak position
Canada Top Albums/CDs (RPM)	47
US Billboard 200	75
