= A Step Further =

Studio album (part live) by Savoy Brown
- Released: September 13, 1969 (US/Canada) / October 1969 (UK)
- Recorded: May 12, 1969 (side two)
- Venue: Cooks Ferry Inn, Edmonton, London (side two)
- Genre: Blues rock; psychedelic rock
- Length: 38:25
- Label: Decca Records (UK) / Parrot Records (US/Canada) (original LP); Deram (CD release)
- Producer: Mike Vernon

Savoy Brown chronology
Blue Matter (1969)	A Step Further (1969)	Raw Sienna (1970)

Singles from A Step Further
- 1. "I'm Tired" Released: October 1969 (US) 7 November 1969 (UK)

Professional ratings
Review scores
Source	Rating
Allmusic	4/5 stars

A Step Further is the fourth studio album by English blues rock band Savoy Brown. It was released by Decca in the United Kingdom and by Parrot in the United States in the fall of 1969. It is the last of the band's albums on which their long-time pianist Bob Hall played. The album track "Made Up My Mind" had first appeared as the B-side of the U.S. single release on Parrot Records 45-40039 (released June 1969), fronted by "Train to Nowhere", from their album Blue Matter. The track "Waiting in the Bamboo Grove" would later be released as the B-side of the U.K. single release on Decca F 13019 (released May 1970), of "A Hard Way To Go" from their album Raw Sienna.

Side two was recorded live at Cooks Ferry Inn, Edmonton, London, on Monday 12 May 1969.

== Track listing ==
Side one

1. "Made Up My Mind" (Chris Youlden) – 2:56
2. "Waiting in the Bamboo Grove" (Kim Simmonds) – 3:37
3. "Life's One Act Play" (Youlden) – 6:29
4. "I'm Tired" (Youlden) – 3:21
5. "Where Am I" (Youlden) – 1:51

Side two

1. "Savoy Brown Boogie" (Live) (Simmonds, Youlden) – 22:02. Includes "Feel So Good" (Chuck Willis), "Whole Lotta Shakin' Goin On" (Sunny David, Dave Williams), "Little Queenie" (Chuck Berry), "Purple Haze" (Jimi Hendrix), "Hernando's Hideaway" (Richard Adler, Jerry Ross).

== Personnel ==
Savoy Brown

- Chris Youlden – vocals
- Kim Simmonds – guitar
- Lonesome Dave – guitar
- Roger Earl – drums
- Tony Stevens – bass
- Bob Hall – piano

Technical

- Mike Vernon – producer, liner notes
- Dave Grinsted – engineer
- Colin Freeman, John Punter, Michael Mailes – assistant engineers
- Terry Noonan – musical arrangements on "Waiting in the Bamboo Grove", "Life's One Act Play" and "Where Am I"
- Terence Ibbott – photography

== Charts ==
Chart (1969)	Peak position
US Billboard 200	71
