= David Malachowski =

American guitarist (1955–2022)

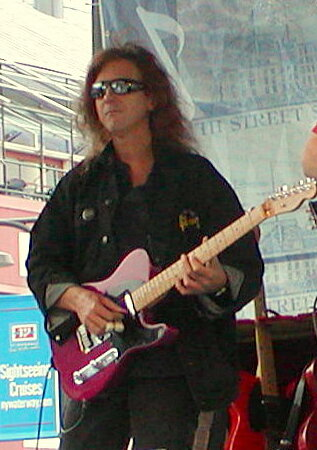
- Malachowski performing as part of Savoy Brown in 2002

Background information
- Also known as: Colonel David
- Born: David Frank Malachowski; January 16, 1955; Schenectady, New York, U.S.
- Died: September 29, 2022 (aged 67) New York City, U.S.
- Genres: Rock, blues, country, folk, musical theatre
- Occupations: Musician, songwriter, music director, producer, journalist
- Instrument: Guitar
- Years active: 1974–2022
- Website: davidmalachowski.com

David Frank Malachowski (January 16, 1955 – September 29, 2022) was an American guitarist, producer, composer, singer, musical director and journalist who resided in Manhattan, New York. He had been a member of Reckless (1978–1981), The Greg Austin Band (1985–1988), Commander Cody & His Lost Planet Airmen (1996–1999), Savoy Brown (2000–2005), Mechanical Bull (2007–2009), and sideman for Janie Fricke (1988), Shania Twain (1995–2007), Garth Hudson (2003), Phoebe Legere (2006), Genya Ravan (2012), Anthony Rapp (2010) and Daphne Rubin-Vega (2014–2022) as well as being involved in musical theatre, writing for newspapers and magazines, producing and writing songs.

== Career ==
Malachowski attended Berklee College of Music for one year. Leaving college, he started his career in 1974 in Boston replacing Walter Egan in the band Dangerfish. In 1977, he co-founded rock band Reckless, touring the east coast and recording one LP on Slippery Records. Malachowski then moved to Lexington, Kentucky, to join the Greg Austin Band recording one album, Somewhere In Kentucky in 1987. Governor Martha Layne Collins commissioned Malachowski a Kentucky Colonel in 1996. He left in 1988 to play on the Saddle the Wind Tour with CBS artist Janie Fricke, his first national tour and played Fan Fair (CMA Fest) also in 1988. In April 1995, after answering an adveryisement in Metroland in Albany, Malachowski became bandleader / guitarist for Shania Twain for two years of television performances, promotional shows and Fan Fair (CMA Fest). In 1997 he joined Commander Cody & His Lost Planet Airmen touring the states, in 1999 became a member of Savoy Brown, touring and recording Strange Dreams (Blind Pig Records) and You Should Have Been There (Panache) as well as appearing on leader Kim Simmonds' solo CD, Blues Like Midnight. In 2005, he performed with the British Blues Allstars at the San Francisco Blues Festival; members included Long John Baldry, Rod Price, Kim Simmonds and Bob Hall. Malachowski left Savoy Brown at the end of 2005, and performed with Ernie Williams, Peter Karp, Jill Stevenson, Mechanical Bull and Phoebe Legere.

In 2007, Malachowski was asked to play the Lake George Blues Blast, and assembled a band featuring, organist Pete Levin and harp player Dennis Gruenling along with drummer Harvey Sorgen, guitarist Albert Cummings and singer Jill Stevenson. The following year Malachowski, Levin and Gruenling reunited bringing in bassist Graham Maby, drummer Gary Burke, singer Machan Taylor, violinist Lorenza Ponce and pianist Daniel A Weiss. Revolving members include Tony Levin, Jerry Marotta, Mike Vicseglia, Marshall Crenshaw, Jerry Velez, Stacey Wilde, Greg Haymes and Ira Coleman.

In 2009, Malachowski released The Secret Life Of Colonel David, in which he produced sang, played guitar, bass, piano, drums and composed four of the five songs. In 2012, his song "I'm Goin' Down To Newberg" was used in the film, Fairhaven. In 2010, he performed in Anthony Rapp's musical Without You at NYMF, then began concert tours with Rapp and Adam Pascal internationally. Without You was mounted again in 2012 in Boston, Edinburgh, London and Toronto. A cast recording was done in September 2012 at Angel Recording Studios in London. Adam Pascal and Anthony Rapp continue to tour.

As of 2018, Malachowski was a member of Pavlov's Dog, performing lead guitar on their album Prodigal Dreamer and performing with the band on their European tour, which opened with two dates at the Wildey Theater in Edwardsville, Illinois, on October 26–27, 2018.

Malachowski died on September 29, 2022.

== Recording credits ==
- 1980 Reckless - Reckless (Slippery Records); guitar, vocals
- 1987 Somewhere In Kentucky - Greg Austin Band; guitar, vocals, composer
- 1994 Mountain Snow and Mistle Two - Bridget Ball & Christopher Shaw; guitar
- 1998 Living On Ritalin - Greg Kroll; guitar, vocals, composer
- 2000 Blues Like Midnight - Kim Simmonds (Blue Wave Records), guitar
- 2002 Flying High Professor - Louie & the Crowmatix (Woodstock Records); guitar
- 2003 Strange Dreams - Savoy Brown (Blind Pig); guitar, vocals
- 2005 You Should Have Been There - Savoy Brown (Panache); guitar, vocals
- 2006 Center - Karen Ellick; producer, guitar, bass, vocals
- 2007 Midnight Legere - Pheobe Legere (Bennett Records); guitar
- 2007 Shadows and Cracks - Peter Karp (Blind Pig Records;) guitar, producer
- 2007 A Million Yesterdays - Mechanical Bull (WMW Records); guitar, vocals
- 2008 We Are One - Michael Falzarono (Woodstock Records); guitar
- 2009 Too Much Of A Good Thing - Savoy Brown (Blue Wave Records); guitar, vocals
- 2010 The Secret Life of Colonel David - David Malachowski (DFM Records); guitar, bass, piano, drums, vocals, producer
- 2010 Moni P - Moni P; producer, guitar, vocals
- 2012 Cheesecake Girl - Genya Ravan (Collectables); guitar, composer
- 2012 Without You - Cast Recording (PC Classics Records); guitar
- 2014 - Daphne Rubin-Vega
- 2018 Prodigal Dreamer - Pavlov's Dog (Rockville Music); guitar

== Bibliography and other sources ==
- Hager, Barbara (1998). On Her Way-the Life and Music of Shania Twain. Berkley Trade. p. 208. ISBN 0425164519.
- Brown, Jim (2004). Shania Twain Up and Away. Fox Music Books. p. 260.
- Williams, Dallas (1997). Shania Twain On My Way. ECW Press. p. 232. ISBN 155022297X.
- Gray, Scott (1998). The Shania Twain Story. Ballantine Books. p. 224. ISBN 0345429362.
- Eggar, Robin (2005). Shania Twain the Biography. Gallery. p. 384. ISBN 074349735X.
- Malachowski, David. "RUNAWAY TWAIN". Albany Times Union.
- Malachowski, David. "Twain's First Tour comes to Pepsi". The Daily Gazette.
- "Commander Cody Utopian Artists". Archived from the original on January 6, 2009.
