= Dave Walker =

English rock singer (born 1945)

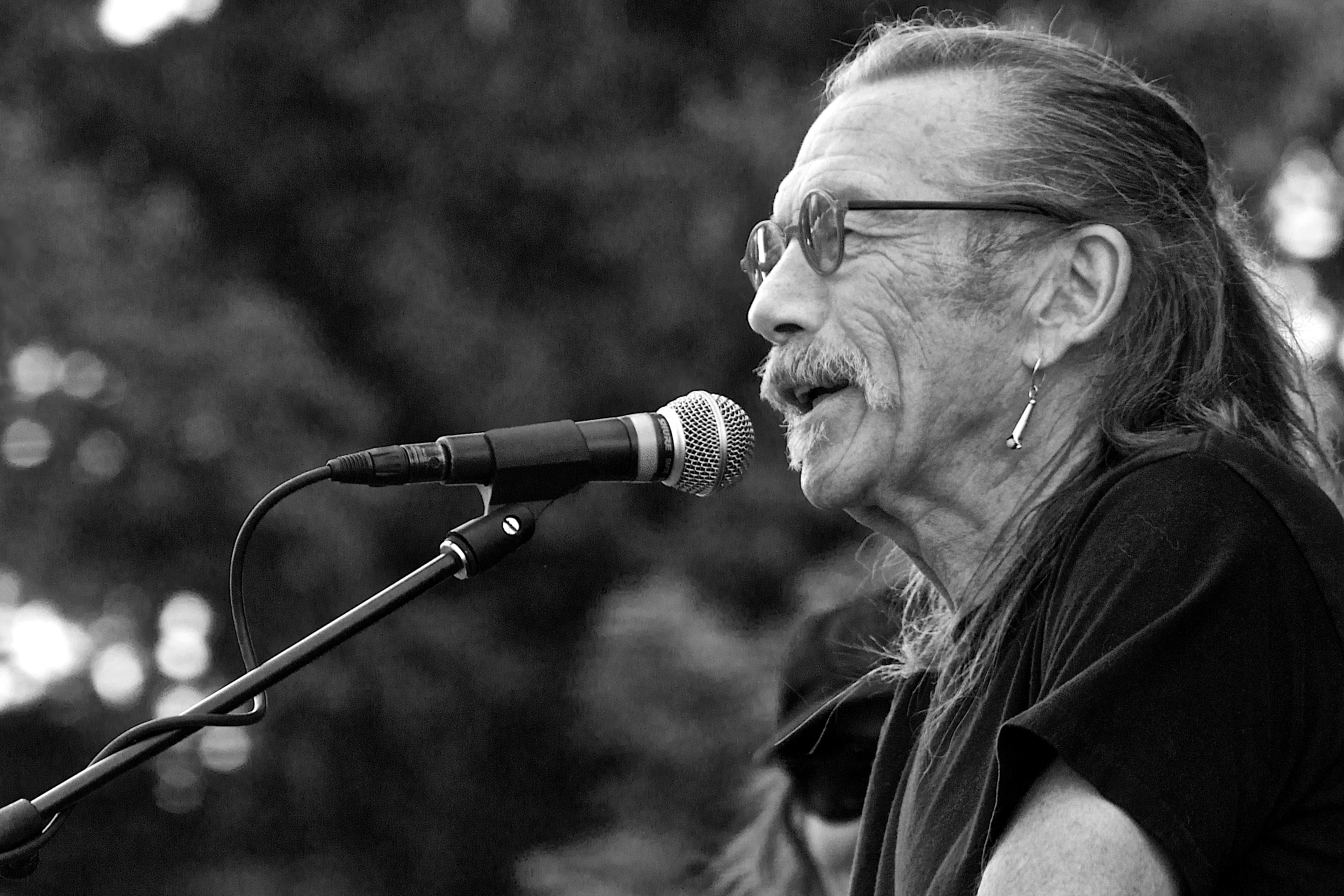
- Walker performing in 2014

Background information
- Born: David Walker; 25 January 1945 (age 81); Walsall, Staffordshire, England
- Genres: R&B; pop; rock; blues; heavy metal
- Instruments: Vocals; guitar; harmonica; tambourine
- Years active: 1960–1979; 1986–present
- Formerly of: The Idle Race; Savoy Brown; Fleetwood Mac; Black Sabbath

David Walker (born 25 January 1945) is an English singer and guitarist who has been front-man for a number of bands, most notably The Idle Race and Savoy Brown; he also sang briefly with Fleetwood Mac and Black Sabbath.

== History ==
=== Early life ===
Walker was raised by his strict grandmother in a household where rock and roll was not allowed to be watched on television. His first experience with public singing came at a very young age at a Methodist church, where Dave volunteered to sing "Away in a Manger". As teenagers, Dave and his brother Mick formed a "backyard skiffle" group which played at weddings and youth gatherings.

== Career ==
=== The Redcaps (1960–1965) ===
Dave Walker started his career in 1960 with a Brumbeat R & B band called The Redcaps. The band was formed by Dave on rhythm guitar, his twin brother Mick Walker (born Michael Walker, 25 January 1945, in Walsall - died 25 February 2016) on bass guitar, Ronnie Brown on lead vocals, Ronnie's brother Roy Brown on lead guitar, Mac Broadhurst on saxophone, and Jimmy Richards on drums. Following an on-stage argument between Dave Walker and Ronnie Brown in 1962, Ronnie departed the band, leaving Dave to take on the role of lead vocalist; and following a tour of France in 1964 both Roy Brown and Jimmy Richards departed the band, and were replaced by Mick Blythe and Alan Morley (who later joined Chicken Shack) respectively.

They recorded three singles for Decca Records, who were trying to cash in on the success of The Beatles, as The Redcaps had opened for The Beatles in concert on four occasions. Their first single, in 1963, was a cover of the pulsating Isley Brothers's "Shout" backed by "Little Things You Do" an original, Beatles influenced tune written by Dave Walker and Roy Brown. However, Lulu had beaten The Redcaps to the British charts with her version of "Shout". Their next single, in 1964, was a cover of Chuck Berry's "Talking About You" backed by "Come on Girl". It has been rumoured that guitarist Jimmy Page, later of Led Zeppelin, played on "Talking About You", in his early pre-Yardbirds London session days, but Walker has since said Page does not play on this track. The story behind the rumour being that Page was available, if needed, but Redcaps guitarist Roy Brown handled the lead parts himself. The track was recorded in a different studio from where Page was working, on the day of the recording. Their final single, "Funny Things" an original tune penned by Blythe backed by "Mighty Fine Girl", was also released in 1964; but after all three singles flopped, The Redcaps disbanded in 1965.

Mick Walker died on 25 February 2016, aged 71.

=== Beckett (1965–1969) ===
Between 1965 and 1969 Walker played in Beckett, a band which included Pete Oliver, Don McGinty and Colin Timmons. Beckett played three days a week at the Rum Runner nightclub in Birmingham (which at the time was managed by Mick Walker), but they never recorded, and disbanded in late 1969.

=== The Idle Race (1970–1971) ===
In early 1970, Jeff Lynne left his original band, The Idle Race, to join The Move with former Idle Race guitarist Roy Wood; just prior to its evolution into the Electric Light Orchestra. Idle Race had built a substantial cult following in the Birmingham area, and wanted to continue after Lynne's exit. This resulted in the remaining members of the band (rhythm guitarist Dave Pritchard, drummer Roger Spencer, and bassist Greg Masters) recruiting Walker as lead vocalist and Mike Hopkins as lead guitarist.

In 1970 this new line-up recorded two singles for Liberty Records; a cover of Mungo Jerry's skiffle hit "In the Summertime", (which reached number one in Argentina) backed by an Idle Race original "Told You Twice". Their second single was a cover of Hotlegs' "Neanderthal Man" backed by another Idle Race original number "Victim of Circumstance".

Also in 1970, Idle Race recorded an album Time Is for Regal Zonophone, however Walker was incorrectly credited as "Richie Walker". Walker wrote two tracks ("I Will See You", "And The Rain") and co-wrote two others ("Alcatraz", "We Want It All") on this album. The album was a commercial failure and in 1971 all members of the incumbent line-up with the exception of Masters (Walker, Hopkins, Pritchard, and Spencer) departed the band. Masters' initially put together another line-up of The Idle Race, but he too soon departed, and the remaining members' soon reformed as the Steve Gibbons Band.

=== Savoy Brown (1971–1972) ===
In 1971, guitarist Kim Simmonds, leader of blues-rock band Savoy Brown, lost the rest of his band - guitarist Dave Peverett, bassist Tony Stevens, and drummer Roger Earl - after they decided to depart Savoy Brown in order to form Foghat with former Black Cat Bones guitarist Rod Price. To replace the departing members, Simmonds hired Walker on vocals, along with three recently departed members' of Stan Webb's Chicken Shack - keyboardist/guitarist Paul Raymond (later of UFO and Michael Schenker Group), bassist Andy Silvester, and drummer Dave Bidwell.

They recorded the Street Corner Talking album in 1971 on Parrot/Deram Records, which included one of Savoy Brown's biggest hits "Tell Mama", written by Raymond, and they headlined a tour over Rod Stewart and The Grease Band in early 1971, as persistent touring was beginning to pay off for the Savoys. The next album, Hellbound Train (Parrot/Deram), was their biggest-selling album to date, reaching the top 40 in the US while the title cut became a concert favourite. Ex-Blodwyn Pig/Juicy Lucy bassist Andy Pyle replaced Silvester by the next album Lion's Share (Parrot/Deram) for which Walker wrote "Denim Demon". Lion's Share was released in late 1972; after Savoy Brown had previewed tracks on their extensive tours earlier that year.

In addition to the studio albums, two "official" live Savoy Brown albums from this era, also include Walker:- a 1972 New York City concert, Live in Central Park (Relix Records) 1985 (LP) and 1989 (CD); and Jack the Toad Live '70/'72 (Mooncrest Records) 2000 taken from Kim Simmonds' personal collection of live Savoy Brown recordings. Simmonds recordings are all from the same venue: Edmonton Gardens in Edmonton, Alberta, Canada but on different dates, and only two tracks include Walker.

Before the late 1972 tour began, Walker decided to leave Savoy Brown in order to join Fleetwood Mac.

=== Fleetwood Mac (1972–1973) ===
In August 1972 Danny Kirwan was fired from Fleetwood Mac and was replaced by Walker on vocals and Bob Weston on guitar. They joined Fleetwood Mac at a time when the band were struggling to record the Penguin album (1973, Reprise Records). Walker only appears on two tracks, his self-penned "The Derelict" and a cover of Jr. Walker & the All Stars' Motown classic "(I'm a) Road Runner".

The subsequent tour seemed to go well, and Penguin was the highest charting Fleetwood Mac album in the US at the time, clawing its way into the Top 50. However, during the recording of their next album, Mystery to Me, it was mutually agreed by the other five members of the band at that time (Mick Fleetwood, Christine McVie, John McVie, Bob Welch, and Weston) that Walker's vocal style and attitude "did not fit in" with Fleetwood Mac and he was asked to leave in mid-1973, ultimately not featuring on Mystery to Me.

=== Hungry Fighter (1974) ===
In 1974 Walker formed the band Hungry Fighter with his former Savoy Brown colleagues bassist Andy Silvester and keyboardist/guitarist Paul Raymond, his predecessor in Fleetwood Mac Danny Kirwan, and former Warhorse drummer Mac Poole. Hungry Fighter only managed to play one live gig, at the University of Surrey in Guildford, England (which was not recorded), before the consequences of a road accident sustained by their crew following the gig (which included the destruction of the band's equipment and serious injuries sustained by one member of the road crew), combined with Kirwan's deteriorating mental health, caused the band to fold.

Mac Poole died on 21 May 2015.

=== Raven (1975–1976) ===
Walker then moved to San Francisco and joined Raven; a band which in its short life had a revolving door of personnel but was fronted throughout by the late ex-Quicksilver Messenger Service guitarist John Cipollina. During Walker's tenure with Raven he performed at some live shows and worked on some of the early recording sessions for what would eventually become Raven's eponymous album (postponed in 1976 but eventually released in 1980 as John Cipollina's Raven); however Walker does not feature on the final release. During Walker's tenure in Raven, the band's line-up consisted of himself, Cipollina, future Greg Kihn Band guitarist Greg Douglass, bassist Skip Olsen, and drummer David Weber.

=== Mistress (1976–1977) ===
Later in 1976, Walker, Douglass, and Olsen decided to leave Raven and join keyboardist Chris Kovacs and drummer Chris Paulsen in Mistress; a fledgling band which had been around since 1972. Olsen departed later that year and was replaced by Dave Brown; with Kovacs also departing and the band adding Charlie Williams on guitar at the same time. With this line-up the band recorded some demos in the hope of gaining a recording contract, but this did not come to fruition during Walker's tenure in the band. In 1977 Walker returned to England to join Black Sabbath and Douglass departed to join the Steve Miller Band; leaving Williams to switch to lead vocalist, and guitarists' Danny Chauncey and Kenny Hopkins to join the band. Eventually the band were able to release an album, which featured a song co-written by Walker and Paulsen, entitled "High on the Ride", amongst its track-listing; but it is unknown whether any of Walker's vocals are featured on this track. The album also included a minor hit, with the ballad "Mistrusted Love" scraping into the US top 50 singles chart. Legal difficulties also caused the eponymous album recorded by Mistress (again without Walker) in 1977 to be shelved, but it was released in 1979 by RSO Records, nearly two years after Mistress broke up.

=== Black Sabbath (1977–1978) ===
Tony Iommi remembered Walker from their days in Birmingham, and contacted Walker in San Francisco, asking him to join Black Sabbath, as singer Ozzy Osbourne had just left the band.

On the flight from San Francisco to London in November 1977, and for the next three weeks, Walker wrote lyrics to the new music which the remaining members of Black Sabbath (guitarist Tony Iommi, bassist Terry 'Geezer' Butler and drummer Bill Ward) wrote for their next album. No vocals were recorded with Walker, but the new line-up appeared on the BBC West Midlands TV programme Look Hear on 6 January 1978, performing their hit "War Pigs" plus an early version of what would eventually become "Junior's Eyes".

Shortly after this appearance, Osbourne decided to rejoin Black Sabbath, so Dave Walker was out before recording with the band. None of Walker's lyrics were used for Black Sabbath's resulting Never Say Die! album, because Osbourne would not sing any material written during his time out of the band. Geezer Butler thus resumed his traditional job as Black Sabbath's primary lyricist, and completely new lyrics for the album were written, including what became "Junior's Eyes". After the 1978 tour to promote the album, Osbourne was asked to leave, and was replaced by Ronnie James Dio.

=== Dave Walker Band #1 (1979) ===
After returning to the US, Walker briefly assembled his own band, consisting of himself, Michael Boyd and Steph Burnbaum on guitars, Jim Pugh on keyboards, Jim Wade on drums, and Mike Williams on bass. This venture was short-lived, and following the band's dissolution Walker temporarily retired from music.

=== Savoy Brown again (1986–1991) ===
After being out of the music business for eight years, in 1986 Kim Simmonds persuaded Walker to rejoin his revamped Savoy Brown, which included Al Macomber on drums and Jim Dagnesi on bass.

In 1987 Walker moved to Gallup, New Mexico where he lived until 1998 and Savoy Brown recorded the Make Me Sweat album, released in early 1988 on GNP Crescendo Records, followed in April 1989 by the Kings of Boogie album (also on GNP Crescendo).

Macomber was replaced by Pete Mendillo on drums, Lou Kaplan replaced Dagnesi on bass and Rick Jewett augmented the line-up on keyboards for the tour to promote Kings of Boogie, and in November 1990 a live album from this tour was released called Live And Kickin' (GNP Crescendo). These well received albums were produced by Neil Norman who sought out Walker's infectious comedic style. However, by September 1991, Walker had had enough of gruelling tours, so he left Savoy Brown again.

=== Donovan's Brain (1999–2003) ===
By the late 1990s Walker had relocated to Bozeman, Montana, where in 1999 he met up with an old friend from his San Francisco days, Ron Sanchez, who had (and still has) a psychedelic garage band called Donovan's Brain, who have an "open door" approach to personnel, jamming and making music. Consequently, between 1999 and 2003 Walker was a member of Donovan's Brain; and during this time he worked on a Donovan's Brain session for their Tiny Crustacean Light Show album (originally on Get Hip Records but now on Career Records), in which he did much of the backing vocals and some lead vocals; a role he also performed on their next album, 2003's The Great Leap Forward. He also sang on what is now considered to be a rare Donovan's Brain track, "22 Lost Marbles" (which appeared on A Pot By Any Other Name, a free CD with issue 30 (Spring 2001) of the independent music magazine Ptolemaic Terrascope), and a Brain cover of a song "The Single #2", originally by the band Man. This cover appeared on a various-artists Man tribute CD Man, We're Glad We Know You: A Tribute to the Man Band (originally a private pressing, but now on Career Records). Several tracks including Walker; that were left over from the TCLS sessions, were released in January 2003 on the Donovan's Brain album, The Great Leap Forward (Career Records).

=== Dave Walker Band #2 (2007–present) ===
In 2007 Dave Walker recorded and released a solo album under his own name. The album, entitled Walking Underwater, featured guitarist Jimmy Lewis; and the working relationship between the two musicians led to Dave Walker reforming a band under his name, featuring musicians solely from his home city of Montana, which has been touring since January 2008. The line-up of the band consists of Walker, Lewis, Chris Cundy (piano, keyboards, Hammond organ), Eddie Tsuru (bass), and Mike Gillan (drums). The band has made appearances at Rockin' The Rivers Music Festival and Magic City Blues Festival.

=== Other contributions ===
Walker had a band called The Pleasure Chorizos in his later New Mexico days in the early 1990s but ultimately the band did nothing of note. Walker played tambourine on a track by The Nomads (who were working in the same studio as Donovan's Brain on 24 May 1999) called "Top Alcohol", which was the B-side to their "The King of Night Train" single (White Jazz Records). He also recorded backing vocals for one track on a 2003 album by Angie Pepper. In 2004, Walker also contributed vocals to a cover of "I'm Tired", on founder member of Savoy Brown John O'Leary's album Sins. This album was re-released as Two for the Show in 2010 on the Acrobat label. In 2005 Walker recorded Mostly Sonny – A Tribute to Sonny Boy Williamson on The Mooreland Street Records label. Musicians included members of Peter Green's Splinter Group, The Kinks, Downliners Sect (Don Craine and Keith Grant) and former Yardbird Ray Majors on lead guitar. In addition to which former Savoy Brown member John O'Leary is featured on harmonica.

In Spring 2020, during COVID lockdown, Walker recorded the Black Sabbath song "The Wizard" under the band name Silver Sabbath (Dave Walker- vocals, Jerry Marotta-drums, Michael Visceglia-bass, Dennis Gruenling- electric harmonica, David Malachowski-guitar), filmed/recorded remotely from New York City, Woodstock, New Jersey, and Montana, edited by Jarek Zabcynski.
