= Gary Holland =

American drummer (born 1958)

- Born: Gary Hallinan; September 14, 1958 (age 67); Syracuse, New York, United States
- Origin: Los Angeles, California, United States
- Genres: Hard rock; heavy metal; glam metal
- Occupation: Musician
- Instrument: Drums

Gary Holland (born Gary Hallinan; September 14, 1958) is an American hard rock and heavy metal drummer who worked in the 1980s with bands originating from California. He is perhaps best known for being the original drummer in Great White and for his brief stint in Dokken. He later played as a session musician and soundtrack contributor.

== Career ==
Holland was born in Syracuse, New York. After high school, he moved to Los Angeles, where he co-founded a rock trio called Suite 19, playing clubs in Hollywood and the surrounding areas. By 1980, Holland was a member of an early version of Dokken, headlining one tour of Europe. After leaving Dokken in 1981, he was briefly a member of Sister, which later became W.A.S.P.

A chance encounter with Dante Fox guitarist, Mark Kendall, at The Troubadour in West Hollywood led to an audition. Holland officially joined Kendall, vocalist Jack Russell, and bassist Don Costa in Dante Fox in November 1981. After replacing Costa with Lorne Black in 1982, Dante Fox changed their name to Great White. Holland appeared on Great White's EP Out of the Night and on the albums Great White and Recovery: Live!, as well as in the music videos for the songs "Stick It" and "Substitute".

Holland was a founding member of Britton and provided drums and backing vocals on the group's 1988 release, Rock Hard. He toured Europe as the drummer for Blue Cheer in 1993, and provided backing vocals on Ozzy Osbourne's albums Ozzmosis and Prince of Darkness. Holland worked also on Twisted Sister's Come Out and Play, on Autograph's That's the Stuff and on Don Dokken's Up from the Ashes. He also collaborated with Mike Inez of Alice in Chains and Gilby Clarke of Guns N' Roses.

He supported tours for Whitesnake (UK), Motörhead (US) and Judas Priest (North America).

Holland appeared in and/or contributed songs to soundtracks of the following: Joe Piscopo HBO Comedy Special starring Joe Piscopo and Eddie Murphy; Can't Buy Me Love starring Patrick Dempsey; Rock and Roll Mom starring Dyan Cannon, Heather Locklear and Fran Drescher; Harold & Kumar Escape from Guantanamo Bay; Maid to Order starring Ally Sheedy.

== Equipment ==
In 2001, Holland used Mapex Drums, Aquarian heads, RIMS drum mounts and Paiste cymbals with Pro-Mark 2S hickory nylon tip drumsticks and DW 9000 bass drum pedals. For his vocals, a Crown CM-311A headset vocal mic.
