= Run to Me (Smokie song) =

1980 song by Smokie

Single by Smokie
- B-side: "Look What You're Doin'"
- Released: 19 September 1980
- Length: 4:12
- Label: RAK
- Songwriter(s): Chris Norman, Pete Spencer
- Producer(s): Smokie

Smokie singles chronology
"Take Good Care of My Baby" (1980)	"Run to Me" (1980)	"Little Town Flirt" (1981)

"Run to Me" is a song by the British rock band Smokie. It was released as a single in 1980 and was also included on the new Smokie greatest-hits albums issued in the same year (Smokie's Greatest Hits Volume 2 in continental Europe and Australia and The Very Best of Smokie — 14 Hit Singles in the UK).

== Background and writing ==
The song was written by Chris Norman and Smokie drummer Pete Spencer and produced by Smokie.

== Commercial performance ==
The Smokie version reached no. 29 in Germany.

== Savoy Brown version ==
"Run to Me"

Single by Savoy Brown

from the album Greatest Hits Live in Concert
- B-side: "Georgie"
- Released: 1981
- Length: 3:48
- Label: Towne House (US); Repertoire (Europe)
- Songwriter(s): Chris Norman, Pete Spencer
- Producer(s): Richie Wise

English blues rock band Savoy Brown released their cover as a single in 1981. It was featured as the sole studio track on that year's Greatest Hits Live in Concert album. It also appeared on German editions of the band's Rock 'N' Roll Warriors album, released the same year.

It became Savoy's highest-charting single in the United States, peaking at number 68 on the Billboard Hot 100 on the week of October 31, 1981.

== Charts ==
=== Smokie version ===
Chart (1980)	Peak position
Austria (Ö3 Austria Top 40)	13
Germany	29

=== Savoy Brown version ===
Chart (1981)	Peak position
US Billboard Hot 100	68
