= Rivers Jobe =

British musician

Rivers Jobe (1950 – 1979), born Rivers Maitland Alexander Job, was a British bass player known for being a member of Anon, one of the two bands which merged to form the progressive rock band Genesis; and for playing on the Savoy Brown album, Getting to the Point (1968), as well as on the tracks "Vicksburg Blues", "Train to Nowhere", and "Tolling Bells" on the following Blue Matter album. Jobe was replaced in Savoy Brown by Tone Stevens (who would later leave Savoy Brown with fellow members Lonesome Dave Peverett and Roger Earl to form Foghat) in November 1968, and performed as a session musician and busker until his death.

He died in 1979 in London, at the age of 29, as the result of being hit by a train (ruled death by misadventure by local authorities).
