= Anon (band) =

English rock band (1965–1966)

- Origin: Surrey, England
- Genres: Rock
- Years active: 1965–1966
- Spinoffs: Genesis
- Past members: Rivers Jobe; Richard Macphail; Anthony Phillips; Rob Tyrrell; Mike Rutherford; Mike Colman

Anon were an English rock band made up of pupils from Charterhouse School in Surrey. Members of the group would eventually merge with another Charterhouse group, called Garden Wall, to form the progressive rock band Genesis. The band formed in May 1965 and split up in December 1966. It originally consisted of Rivers Jobe (bass), Richard Macphail (vocals), Anthony Phillips (lead guitar), and Rob Tyrrell (drums). They were later joined by future Genesis guitarist/bassist Mike Rutherford on rhythm guitar. During a short period of time, Rutherford was forced to leave the band by his house master at Charterhouse and was replaced by Mike Colman.

== History ==
The band was formed when Anthony Phillips met up with Rivers Jobe (born Rivers Job). While friends at prep school, Phillips and Jobe were in a band called The Spiders. The Spiders had been a Beatles type band, and when Phillips entered Charterhouse in April 1965, he hooked up with his old friend and formed Anon with Rob Tyrrell and Richard Macphail within a week. The band's name was short for "anonymous".

Just after Anon had formed, young guitarist Mike Rutherford, who had been at Charterhouse since November 1964, heard that there was a chance he would be let into the band as a rhythm guitarist. He met up with and befriended Phillips and Macphail, passed an audition and was subsequently given a place in the band.

Anon was dedicated to covering songs by the Beatles, the Rolling Stones, and rhythm and blues music from that era, like John Mayall. The only recording the band ever made was the only original song that the band had during this period, a demo of a song called "Pennsylvania Flickhouse" written by Anthony Phillips.

The members of Anon and Garden Wall were seen as the rebels of the school, as Charterhouse offered an extensive range of activities for pupils, but the members of the bands chose to play music. All music except for classical music was frowned upon by the teachers in the school. The members of Anon used to have their hair longer than everyone else and go down to the local pubs as a sign of rebellion. As a result, the band suffered pressure from their parents and teachers. This led to Macphail departing the band because of his parents' attitude to him being in a rock band (leaving Rutherford to take over as singer), and Rutherford leaving the group because his house master confiscated his guitar. Rutherford was replaced by a returning Macphail and guitarist Mike Colman, with Colman departing shortly thereafter and Rutherford returning to the fold.

The band continued to go on with the five-piece lineup until July 1966, when Rivers Jobe and Richard Macphail were scheduled to leave Charterhouse. Macphail decided that his band would do a concert with Garden Wall both as top acts and with a third band opening, so Anon set about getting together a concert that was staged within the school. The event marked the end of the five-piece lineup, with Jobe and Macphail quitting the band. Jobe went on to join Savoy Brown, while Macphail went on to become a sound engineer for Genesis until 1973.

The band, now only Phillips, Rutherford (who took on Macphail's duties whilst Jobe went unreplaced), and Tyrrell, carried on. Eventually Tyrrell left, leading the band to break up in December 1966. Tyrrell would later become the drummer of the band Sour Milk Sea. Phillips and Rutherford then went on to join with all three members of Garden Wall (vocalist Peter Gabriel, keyboardist Tony Banks, and drummer Chris Stewart) in 1967, to form Genesis (with Rutherford buying his first bass), in January 1967.

== Personnel ==
=== Members ===
- Rivers Jobe – bass (May 1965 – July 1966; died 1979)
- Richard Macphail – lead vocals (May 1965 – Spring 1966, Spring 1966 – July 1966; died 2024)
- Anthony Phillips – lead guitar (May 1965 – December 1966), rhythm guitar (May 1965)
- Rob Tyrrell – drums (May 1965 – December 1966)
- Mike Rutherford – rhythm guitar (May 1965 – Spring 1966, Spring 1966 – December 1966), lead vocals (Spring 1966, July 1966 – December 1966), bass (July 1966 – December 1966)
- Mike Colman – rhythm guitar (Spring 1966; died 2010)

=== Lineups ===
May 1965	May 1965 – Spring 1966	Spring 1966	Spring 1966
Rivers Jobe – bass; Richard Macphail – lead vocals; Anthony Phillips – lead guitar, rhythm guitar; Rob Tyrrell – drums	Rivers Jobe – bass; Richard Macphail – lead vocals; Anthony Phillips – lead guitar; Rob Tyrrell – drums; Mike Rutherford – rhythm guitar	Rivers Jobe – bass; Anthony Phillips – lead guitar; Rob Tyrrell – drums; Mike Rutherford – lead vocals, rhythm guitar	Rivers Jobe – bass; Anthony Phillips – lead guitar; Rob Tyrrell – drums; Mike Colman – rhythm guitar; Richard Macphail – lead vocals
Spring 1966 – July 1966	July 1966 – December 1966
Rivers Jobe – bass; Anthony Phillips – lead guitar; Rob Tyrrell – drums; Richard Macphail – lead vocals; Mike Rutherford – rhythm guitar	Anthony Phillips – lead guitar; Rob Tyrrell – drums; Mike Rutherford – lead vocals, bass, rhythm guitar
