= Blue Matter (Savoy Brown album) =

Studio album (part live) by Savoy Brown
- Released: May 1969 (UK)
- Recorded: March 19, 1968–January 1969; December 6, 1968 (tracks 7–9)
- Venue: City of Leicester College of Education, Scraptoft, Leicestershire (tracks 7–9)
- Genre: Blues rock
- Length: 49:27
- Label: Decca Records (UK) / Parrot Records (US/Canada) (original LP); Deram (CD release)
- Producer: Mike Vernon

Savoy Brown chronology
Getting to the Point (1968)	Blue Matter (1969)	A Step Further (1969)

Professional ratings
Review scores
Source	Rating
AllMusic	4.5/5 stars

Blue Matter is the third studio album by English blues rock band Savoy Brown. Teaming up once again with producer Mike Vernon, it finds them experimenting even more within the blues framework. Several tracks feature piano (played by Bob Hall, guitarist Kim Simmonds, and vocalist Chris Youlden, who plays guitar here) as well as trombone.

This album featured a mix of live and studio recordings. The live tracks were recorded on December 6, 1968, at the now defunct City of Leicester College of Education, because the band was scheduled to tour the US and needed additional tracks to complete the album in time for the tour. The booking at the college represented their only chance to record the extra tracks in a live venue, before embarking on the tour. An offer to perform the concert free of charge was accepted by Chris Green, the college Social Secretary, who had made the original booking, and the concert was duly recorded, a number of the live tracks being added to the album. Because Chris Youlden was suffering from tonsillitis, Dave Peverett stood in as lead vocalist on the live tracks.

The album track "Vicksburg Blues" had first appeared as the B-side of Decca single F 12797 (released June 1968), fronted by "Walking by Myself".

Both Zigzag magazine and Rolling Stone magazine considered "Train to Nowhere" as the quintessential Savoy Brown song.

== Track listing ==
1. "Train to Nowhere" (Kim Simmonds, Chris Youlden) – 4:12
2. "Tolling Bells" (Simmonds, Youlden) – 6:33
3. "She's Got a Ring in His Nose and a Ring on Her Hand" (Youlden) – 3:07
4. "Vicksburg Blues" (Bob Hall, Youlden) – 4:00
5. "Don't Turn Me from Your Door" (John Lee Hooker) – 5:04
6. "Grits Ain't Groceries (All Around the World)" (Titus Turner) – 2:42 (CD bonus track)
7. "May Be Wrong" (live) (Dave Peverett) – 7:50
8. "Louisiana Blues" (live) (McKinley Morganfield) – 9:06
9. "It Hurts Me Too" (live) (Mel London) – 6:53

== Personnel ==
Savoy Brown

- Chris Youlden – lead vocals, guitar, piano
- Kim Simmonds – lead guitar, harmonica, piano
- "Lonesome" Dave Peverett – rhythm guitar, plus lead vocal on live tracks 7, 8, 9
- Tone Stevens – bass (except on tracks 1, 2 and 4)
- Rivers Jobe – bass (on tracks 1, 2 and 4)
- Roger Earl – drums, percussion
- Bob Hall – piano

Additional musicians

- Terry Flannery, Keith Martin, Brian Perrin, Derek Wadsworth – tenor trombones on "Train to Nowhere"
- Alan Moore – Bb/F trombone on "Train to Nowhere"
- Mike Vernon – percussion on "Train to Nowhere"

== Production ==
- Track one arranged by Terry Noonan, Savoy Brown & Mike Vernon
- Produced by Mike Vernon
- Recorded & Engineered by Roy Thomas Baker
- Assistant Recording Engineers: Colin Freeman, Michael Mailes, John Punter, Mike Vernon
- David Anstey – cover design
- David Wedgbury – photography

== Charts ==
Chart (1969)	Peak position
US Billboard 200	182
