= Raw Sienna (album) =

Studio album by Savoy Brown
- Released: April 25, 1970 (US/Canada) / May 4, 1970 (UK)
- Recorded: 1969
- Studios: Recorded Sound Studios, Bryanston Street, Marble Arch, London
- Genre: Blues rock
- Length: 36:53
- Labels: Decca Records (UK) / Parrot Records (US/Canada) (original LP); Deram (CD release)
- Producers: Kim Simmonds, Chris Youlden

Savoy Brown chronology
A Step Further (1969)	Raw Sienna (1970)	Looking In (1970)

Singles from Raw Sienna
- 1. "A Hard Way to Go" Released: March 1970 (US) 7 May 1970 (UK)

Professional ratings
Review scores
Source	Rating
Allmusic	4.5/5 stars

Raw Sienna is the fifth studio album by British blues rock band Savoy Brown. It was recorded and released by Decca in the United Kingdom in 1970 in both mono and stereo (LK/SKL 5043). For release in United States and Canada, masters were leased to Parrot Records (London Records)—PAS 71036.

AllMusic noted that

Unfortunately, leader Kim Simmonds lost his greatest asset when vocalist Chris Youlden quit for an ill-fated solo career after this recording. Youlden had one of the most distinctive voices in British blues.

== Track listing ==
Side one

1. "A Hard Way to Go" (Chris Youlden) – 2:17
2. "That Same Feelin'" (Kim Simmonds) – 3:36
3. "Master Hare" (Simmonds) – 4:45
4. "Needle and Spoon" (Youlden) – 3:18
5. "A Little More Wine" (Youlden) – 4:51

Side two

1. "I'm Crying" (Youlden) – 4:17
2. "Stay While the Night Is Young" (Youlden) – 3:07
3. "Is That So" (Simmonds) – 7:40
4. "When I Was a Young Boy" (Youlden) – 3:02

== Personnel ==
Savoy Brown

- Chris Youlden – vocals; piano on tracks 4, 6, 9
- Kim Simmonds – lead guitar; piano on tracks 2, 3
- "Lonesome" Dave Peverett – rhythm guitar, acoustic guitar; bottleneck guitar on track 5
- Tone Stevens – bass
- Roger Earl – drums, percussion

Technical

- Kim Simmonds, Chris Youlden – producers, arrangements
- Terry Noonan – brass and string arrangements
- Paul Tregurtha – engineer
- Malcolm Addey – mixing engineer
- Ignatz – artwork

== Charts ==
Chart (1970)	Peak position
Canada Top Albums/CDs (RPM)	75
US Billboard 200	121
