= Savoy Brown =

Welsh/English blues rock band (1965–2022)

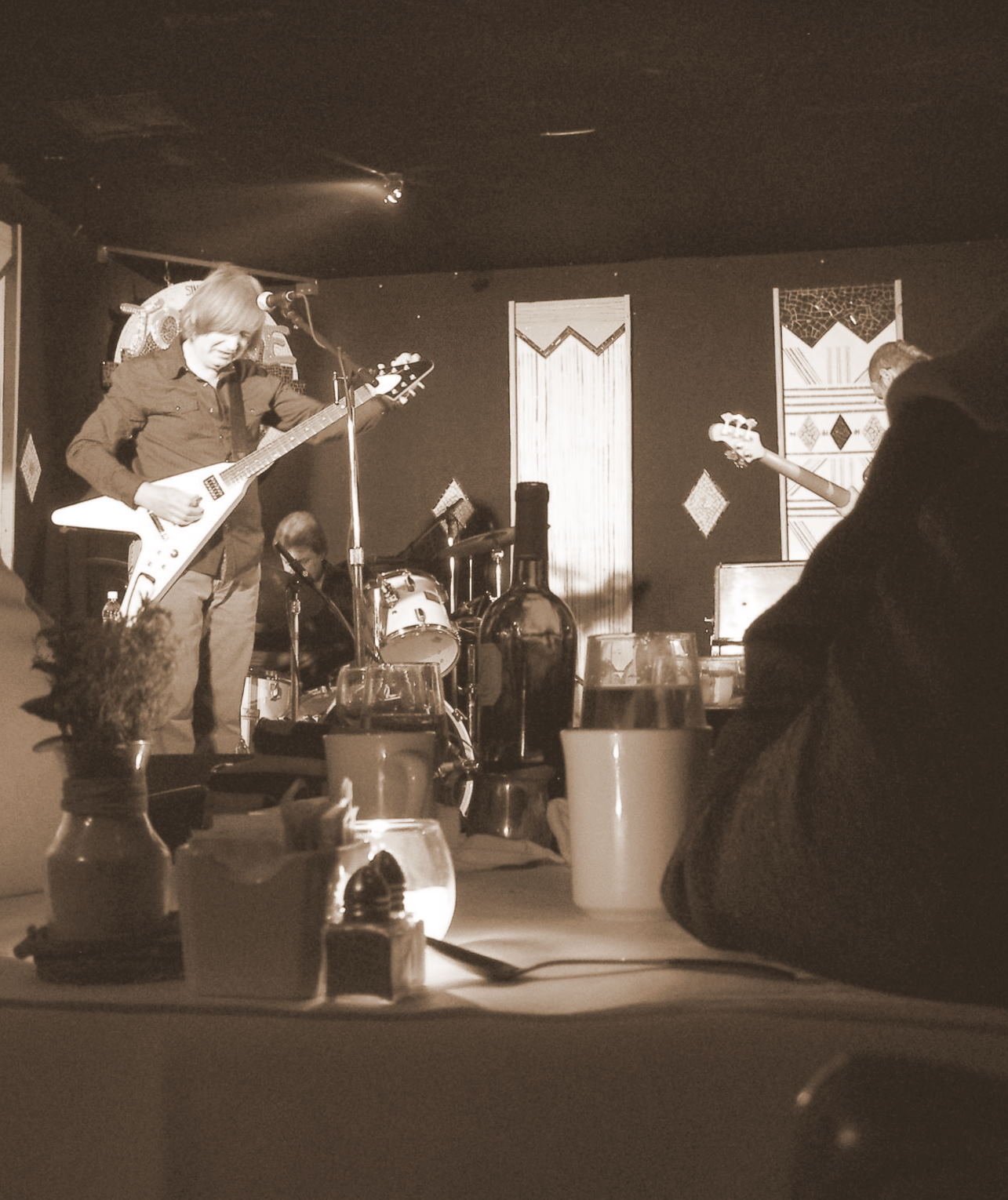
- Savoy Brown at the Towne Crier Café in Pawling, NY; 6 April 2007

Background information
- Also known as: Savoy Brown Blues Band
- Origin: London, England
- Genre: Blues rock
- Years active: 1965–2022
- Labels: Decca, Deram, Parrot, Blind Pig, GNP Crescendo
- Spinoffs: Foghat
- Past members: See list of Savoy Brown members
- Website: savoybrown.com

Savoy Brown (originally Savoy Brown Blues Band) were an English blues rock band formed in Battersea, southwest London, in 1965. Part of the late 1960s blues rock movement, Savoy Brown primarily achieved success in the United States, where they promoted their albums with non-stop touring. Founder, guitarist and primary songwriter Kim Simmonds was the sole constant member of the band from its formation in 1965 until his death in 2022. They were one of the bands that UK Decca (US London/Parrot) stuck with through the lean times until they started selling records; it took four or five albums until they started to sell in the US. In the late 1960s and 1970s, the band managed to break into the Billboard Hot 100.

== Formation ==
The band was formed by guitarist Kim Simmonds and harmonica player John O'Leary, following a chance meeting at Transat Imports record shop in Lisle Street, Soho, in 1965. In naming themselves, the group put together two words that conveyed an interesting balance of opposite sentiments and approaches. The word "Savoy" came from an American blues label, Savoy Records, as the members of the band thought the word "Savoy" sounded elegant. They added "Brown" because they thought it was an extremely plain word. Overall, the group called itself the Savoy Brown Blues Band to tell listeners that they played Chicago Blues-sounding music.

The original lineup included singer Brice Portius, keyboardist Trevor Jeavons, bassist Ray Chappell, drummer Leo Manning and harmonica player John O'Leary (O'Leary appeared on record with the band on its initial recordings for Mike Vernon's Purdah label). Portius was one of the first black blues musicians to be a part of a British rock band. Jeavons was replaced by Bob Hall shortly after the band's formation and the arrival of Martin Stone on guitars. Not long after Stone's arrival, O'Leary left the band as a consequence of a dispute with Kim's brother and manager, Harry Simmonds. This lineup, sans O'Leary, appeared on the band's 1967 debut album, Shake Down, a collection of blues covers.

== Personnel changes & forming Foghat ==
Further lineup changes ensued, with founding members Portius, Chappell and Manning departing along with recently recruited guitarist Stone over a short period of time. Chris Youlden and "Lonesome" Dave Peverett would become the band's new vocalist and second guitarist respectively. Initially Bob Brunning and Hughie Flint (from John Mayall's Clapton-version Bluesbreakers) filled the bassist and drummer positions on the single "Taste and Try (Before You Buy)," but they were subsequently replaced respectively by Rivers Jobe (from the Anon, who also contributed members to Genesis) and Bill Bruford. Within a fortnight of Bruford's arrival in the band, he had been replaced by Roger Earl (Bruford went on to huge success later as Yes's drummer).

Now officially known as Savoy Brown, this lineup recorded two albums in 1968, Getting to the Point, and Blue Matter, which demonstrated Youlden's rise as a songwriter alongside Simmonds. It was this lineup that released the single "Train to Nowhere" in 1969. A Step Further was released later that year and introduced bassist Tony Stevens replacing Jobe. They developed a loyal core following in the United States, due to songs such as "I'm Tired," a driving, melodic song from the album.

Following the release of Raw Sienna (released in the spring of 1970) Youlden departed the band in May 1970 over musical differences. Raw Sienna marked the first time the band had recorded successive albums without any changes in personnel. The band then recorded their next album, 1970's Looking In, as a four-piece, and following this album Peverett, Stevens and Earl left in December of 1970, eventually to form Foghat with guitarist Rod Price.

== Chicken Shack ==
This left Simmonds as the only remaining member. Simmonds reformed Savoy Brown in December 1970 with new vocalist Pete Scott, former Blodwyn Pig bassist Andy Pyle, drummer Ron Berg and former Chicken Shack keyboardist Paul Raymond.

In May 1971, after an American tour, Scott was replaced by Dave Walker of the Idle Race, while Pyle and Berg made way for Andy Silvester and Dave Bidwell respectively, both former bandmates of Raymond in Chicken Shack. But despite their next album, Street Corner Talking (September 1971), getting significant airplay, superstardom perpetually evaded them. Then, their next album, Hellbound Train (in early 1972), was a Top 40 album for them in the US. Silvester then left in June 1972 for "personal reasons" and Pyle returned.

After recording Lion's Share, Walker left Savoy Brown in September 1972 to join Fleetwood Mac. He was replaced by Jackie Lynton. Partway through the recording of their next album Jack the Toad, Bidwell was also replaced by the returning Ron Berg. This lineup completed the album's recording, and its subsequent promotional tour, before Simmonds decided to dispense with this grouping.

== Boogie Brothers ==
Simmonds rebuilt the group with Hemlock members Miller Anderson (lead vocals, rhythm guitar), Jim Leverton (bass, backing vocals) and Eric Dillon (drums). Then in January 1974, the British music magazine, NME reported that Stan Webb was joining Savoy Brown, following the break-up of Chicken Shack.

"More even than John Mayall, this band was the great mean—that is, the mean—of the purist (as opposed to heavy) wing of what we in America once called British blues."

— Christgau's Record Guide: Rock Albums of the Seventies (1981)

The new lineup released Boogie Brothers in April and toured until July, before splitting up and leaving Simmonds to rebuild the band yet again.

== 1974-1980 ==
By late 1974, Simmonds had brought back keyboardist/guitarist Paul Raymond and drummer Dave Bidwell, as well as adding new lead vocalist Dave Tedstone and bassist Andy Rae. This lineup toured the UK and Germany in early 1975, before Tedstone was dismissed and not replaced – Simmonds took over on lead vocals for the first time in the band's history. Bidwell left for a second time during the recording of Wire Fire and was replaced for the rest of the sessions by Tommy Farnell; the album was released in October and a tour followed until December, after which Rae was also replaced by Ian Ellis.

Skin 'n' Bone followed in April 1976, after which Raymond left in July to join UFO.

After Raymond's departure, with the band reduced to a trio, Simmonds decided to take a break and placed Savoy Brown on hiatus.

In early 1978, Savoy Brown returned with Kim Simmonds, Ian Ellis and Tommy Farnell joined on tour by an unknown keyboardist; however, the new member was dismissed before the band recorded its next album Savage Return, which credited only the trio. Following the album's release and promotional tour, Simmonds relocated to the United States in 1978, settling in the Ohio area with his second wife; he toured during 1979 and 1980 with a lineup including drummer/vocalist Richie Carmichael and bassist Mike Gardner, who left suddenly to join Ted Nugent's band and was replaced with a bassist named Jim, then a bass player known only as "D.C." (Don Cook). At this point, he gradually severed ties with his manager/brother Harry, who ended up in jail after a drug charge.

== Rock 'N' Roll Warriors ==
In 1980 Simmonds re-organised the band with singer Ralph Morman, formerly of the Joe Perry Project, drummer Keith Boyce and guitarist Barry Paul of Heavy Metal Kids fame, and bassist John Humphrey. This lineup toured with Judas Priest in the spring of 1981 and recorded the 1981 Rock 'N' Roll Warriors album, which gave Savoy Brown more success than the group had seen since the mid-1970s. The single "Run to Me", a cover of a song originally recorded by Smokie, became Savoy's highest-charting single in the United States, peaking at number 68 on the Billboard Hot 100 on the week of 31 October 1981.

That year also found the band recording a live album at the Rainbow Music Hall in Denver on 27 June 1981. Greatest Hits – Live in Concert was released at the end of the year, featuring "Run to Me" as the sole studio track, as the single had appeared previously only on the German version of Rock 'N' Roll Warriors. Despite the success of this lineup, Simmonds was once again on his own by the Spring of 1982.

== The 80s ==
Savoy Brown was inactive for almost two years, before returning in late 1983 with a lineup of Simmonds, vocalist/guitarist Andrew Gerome, bassist Stutz Bearcat and drummer Tommy Amato. The group continued touring during 1984, and was briefly renamed the Kim Simmonds Band.

Simmonds also toured with Brian Auger, Gregg Errico (from Sly and the Family Stone and Santana) and Tim Bogert (from Vanilla Fudge) in the mid-1980s in a band they called Maestro. No album resulted from this collaboration and tour, but after Simmonds' sudden exit from this tour, he was sued by his current manager Ira Blacker and relocated to upstate New York.

In 1985 Savoy Brown signed with Relix Records and introduced a new incarnation featuring vocalist/harmonica player Speedo Jones and bassist Chris Romanelli. Slow Train, a collection of acoustic recordings, was released in September 1986, shortly after which Simmonds introduced yet another lineup with vocalist Jimmy Kunes, bassist Jim Dagnesi and drummer Al Macomber; and early the next year, Kunes was replaced by a returning Dave Walker and Shmutza-Hideous joined on percussion (keyboards were handled by various guest performers, including Les Baker, Robert Martin and Bobby Sexton between 1986 and 1989 and both Steve Klong and Paul Aronson guested on percussion in 1988-1989).

Make Me Sweat was released in January 1988. Walker, Dagnesi and Macomber all remained for Kings of Boogie, issued in March 1989. For the album's tour, Simmonds and Walker were joined by bassist Lou Kaplan, drummer Pete Mendillo and keyboardist Rick Jewett, all members of roots rock band Mad Jack.

== The 90s & beyond ==
Kaplan and Mendillo left in 1990 and were replaced by Loren Kraft and Steve Behrendt, respectively, while Jeff Adams joined on guitar. Walker left for a second time in September 1991. He was replaced by Pete McMahon and Phil McCormack. Around the same time, Andy Ramirez and Joe Pierleoni took over from Kraft and Behrendt.

Following the release of Let It Ride in 1992, Simmonds, McMahon, Ramirez and Pierleoni toured through to 1993. Jim Heyl and Dave Olson replaced Ramirez and Pierleoni for the 1994 album Bring It Home.

During the second half of the 1990s, Savoy Brown was centered around Simmonds and bassist Nathaniel Peterson, both of whom shared lead vocal duties. The group went through a succession of drummers – first Al Cash, followed by T. Xiques and later Tom Compton. Following the album's release, Simmonds enlisted second guitarist David Malachowski (formerly of Shania Twain's band), bassist Gerry Sorrentino (formerly of Shemekia Copeland's band) and drummer Dennis Cotton (known for his work with Duke Robillard).

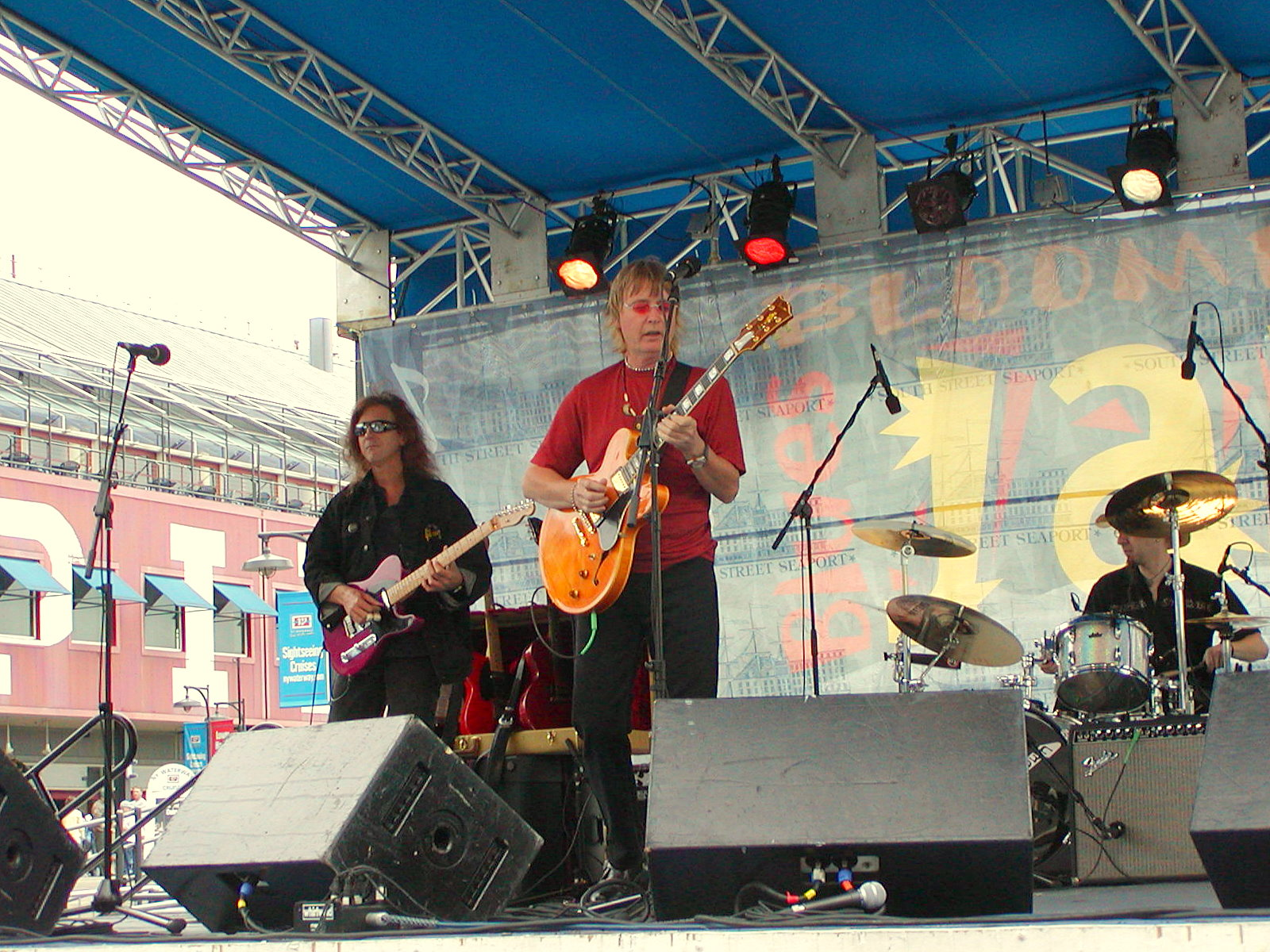
Savoy Brown performing in 2002

With Malachowski, Sorrentino and Cotton, Savoy Brown signed to Blind Pig Records and released the studio album Strange Dreams in 2003 and the live collection You Should Have Been There! in 2004. Malachowski left the band in 2005. Cotton followed later in the year and was replaced by Mario Staiano. This new trio issued Steel in 2007. In August 2009, Sorrentino was forced to leave the group due to illness, with Pat DeSalvo taking his place. Later in the year, Staiano was also replaced by Garnet Grimm, and Joe Whiting joined on lead vocals and saxophone. Voodoo Moon was released in 2011. Whiting left in late 2012.

Simmonds eventually returned to performing lead vocals, and after 2014 the group went on to release a slew of studio and live albums. In 2015, billed as Kim Simmonds and Savoy Brown, their album, The Devil to Pay, reached number four on the US Billboard Top Blues Albums chart.

Kim Simmonds died on 13 December 2022 and the band disbanded shortly after his death.

During the band's active years, they toured the world and recorded regularly, with only Simmonds having been in the band since its beginning. Original member and harmonica player John O'Leary is still active on the British blues circuit with his band Sugarkane. After leaving Savoy Brown for the first time in the 1970s singer Dave Walker joined Fleetwood Mac for one album, and in early 1978 became the temporary lead singer for Black Sabbath. Bassists have included: Andy Pyle, who played with Mick Abrahams from Jethro Tull in Blodwyn Pig, then later with The Kinks; John Humphrey, who would go on to work with many major artists, including Carole King; Gary Moore; and Andy Silvester, who played with Wha-Koo after Chicken Shack. Savoy Brown also provided an outlet for keyboardist and guitarist Paul Raymond, who later went on to join UFO. Drummer Keith Boyce reformed Heavy Metal Kids and is currently active with that group. Singer Ralph Morman disappeared from the scene in the mid-1980s until emerging in 2011 with plans for a solo project. Guitarist Barry Paul became a successful studio owner in Los Angeles. Singer Jimmy Kunes, who fronted the band during the mid-1980s, is currently the singer for the reformed supergroup Cactus.

== Pop culture ==
Savoy Brown contributed the song "A Man Alone" to the soundtrack of the movie Kickboxer 2.

In 2008, "Train to Nowhere" was used, and figured as a clue, in the TV series CSI: NY, in Season 4, Episode 10 – "The Thing About Heroes".

== Discography ==
=== Albums ===
- Shake Down (1967) not issued in the US until CD release in 1990.
- Getting to the Point (1968)
- Blue Matter (1969) –US No. 182
- A Step Further (1969) –US No. 71
- Raw Sienna (1970) –US No. 121; CAN No. 75
- Looking In (1970) –US No. 39, UK No. 50; AUS No. 25, CAN No. 58
- Street Corner Talking (1971) –US No. 75; CAN No. 47
- Hellbound Train (1972) –US No. 34; CAN No. 40
- Lion's Share (1972) –US No. 151
- Jack the Toad (1973) –US No. 84
- Boogie Brothers (1974) –US No. 101; CAN No. 95
- Wire Fire (1975) –US No. 153
- Skin 'n' Bone (1976) –US No. 206
- Savage Return (1978) –US No. 208
- Rock 'n' Roll Warriors (1981) Town House 7002 –US No. 185
- Greatest Hits Live in Concert (1981) Town House 7003 [2-LP]
- Just Live [recorded 1970] (1981) Line Records 5122
- Live in Central Park [recorded 1972] (1985) Relix 2014
- Slow Train (An Album of Acoustic Music) (1986) Relix 2023
- Make Me Sweat (1988) GNP Crescendo 2193
- Kings of Boogie (1989) GNP Crescendo 2196
- Live and Kickin' (1990) GNP Crescendo 2202
- Let It Ride (1992) Roadhouse Music 44001
- Bring It Home (1994) Viceroy Music 8018; billed as 'Savoy Brown/Kim Simmonds'
- Archive Alive! Live at the Record Plant 1975 (1998) Archive Recordings 80014
- The Bottom Line Encore Collection [live, recorded 1981] (1999) The Bottom Line Record Company 47404
- The Blues Keep Me Holding On (1999) Mystic Music/WEA 54323
- Looking from the Outside: Live '69/'70 (2000) Mooncrest 051
- Jack the Toad: Live '70/'72 (2000) Mooncrest 052
- Hellbound Train: Live 1969-1972 (2003) Castle 81309 [2-CD] reissue of both Mooncrest titles
- Strange Dreams (2003) Blind Pig 5082
- You Should Have Been There! [live, recorded February 2003] (2004) Panache
- Steel (2007) Panache
- Too Much of a Good Thing: The Savoy Brown Collection 1992-2007 (2009) Panache
- Voodoo Moon (2011) Ruf 1173
- Songs from the Road (2013) Ruf 1187
- Goin' to the Delta (2014) Ruf 1196; billed as 'Kim Simmonds and Savoy Brown'
- The Devil to Pay (2015) Ruf 1220; billed as 'Kim Simmonds and Savoy Brown'
- Still Live After 50 Years, Volume 1 (2015) Panache; billed as 'Kim Simmonds and Savoy Brown'
- Still Live After 50 Years, Volume 2 (2017) Panache; billed as 'Kim Simmonds and Savoy Brown'
- Witchy Feelin' (2017) Ruf 1251
- City Night (2019) Quarto Valley 0114
- Ain't Done Yet (2020) Quarto Valley 0129
- Taking the Blues Back Home: Savoy Brown Live in America [recorded 1997-1998] (2020) Indigo IGOCD-001 [3-CD]
- Blues All Around (2023) Quarto Valley 0165

=== Selected singles ===
- "Shake 'Em on Down (Part 1)" / "Shake 'Em on Down (Part 2)" (1968) Parrot 40034
- "Grits Ain't Groceries (All Around the World)" / "She's Got a Ring In His Nose and a Ring on Her Hand" (1969) Parrot 40037
- "Train to Nowhere" / "Made Up My Mind" (1969) Parrot 40039
- "I'm Tired" (1969) Parrot 40042 –US No. 74; CAN No. 51
- "A Hard Way to Go" (1970) Parrot 40046
- "Poor Girl" (1970) Parrot 40057
- "Sitting An' Thinking" (1971) Parrot 40060
- "Tell Mama" (1971) Parrot 40066 –US No. 83
- "Run to Me" (1981) Town House 1055 –US No. 68
