= Andy Silvester =

British musician (born 1947)

- Born: Andrew Frederick Silvester; 16 June 1947 (age 79)
- Genres: Rock, blues
- Instrument: Bass guitar
- Years active: 1965–present

Andrew Frederick Silvester (born 16 June 1947, Kidderminster, Worcestershire, England) is a British bassist and multi-instrumentalist. Silvester has played in various bands during his career, most notably as co-founder of both Chicken Shack and Big Town Playboys as well as a tenure in the British blues band Savoy Brown and Los Angeles based soft rock ensemble, Big Wha-Koo. He has also performed with Martha Veléz, the Steve Gibbons Band, ex-Fleetwood Mac guitarist Danny Kirwan, Savoy Brown vocalist Chris Youlden and The Honeydrippers.
