= Bob Hall (musician) =

English blues pianist (born 1942)

- Born: Robert Hall; 13 June 1942 (age 84); West Byfleet, Surrey, England
- Genre: Blues
- Occupation: Pianist

Robert Leonard Hall (born 13 June 1942) is an English boogie-woogie pianist. A long-time collaborator of Alexis Korner, he also performed regularly with bottleneck bluesman Dave Kelly and his sister, Jo Ann Kelly.

== Early life and education ==
Hall grew up in Bermondsey, London and graduated with a Bachelor of Science degree from Durham University in 1963.

== Career ==
Founder member of several British blues bands including The Groundhogs, Tramp, The Sunflower Blues Band and The De Luxe Blues Band, Hall has worked and recorded with artists such as Peter Green, Danny Kirwan and Mick Fleetwood, of Fleetwood Mac, and is also a long serving member of Savoy Brown, and guests with The Blues Band, featuring Paul Jones, Dave Kelly and Tom McGuinness.

Hall was also a founder-member, with Ian Stewart, of the Boogie Woogie Big Band which later became Rocket 88, and which included Hal Singer, Don Weller and Dick Morrissey among many leading jazzmen, together with Charlie Watts, Alexis Korner, and Jack Bruce.

As a sideman, he has accompanied such blues names as John Lee Hooker, Howlin' Wolf, Little Walter, Jimmy Witherspoon, Chuck Berry, Homesick James, Lightnin' Slim, Lowell Fulson, Charlie Musselwhite, Snooky Pryor, J. B. Hutto, Lazy Lester, Dave Peabody, Baby Boy Warren, Eddie "Guitar" Burns, Eddie Taylor, Big John Wrencher, Mickey Baker, and Eddy Clearwater.
