= Chris Youlden =

English singer (1943–2025)

- Born: Christopher Thomas Youlden; 1 January 1943; Dagenham, Essex, England
- Died: 4 April 2025 (aged 82)
- Genres: Blues rock
- Occupation(s): Musician, singer-songwriter
- Instrument(s): Vocals, piano, guitar
- Labels: London
- Formerly of: Savoy Brown

Christopher Thomas Youlden (1 January 1943 – 4 April 2025) was an English blues rock singer. He worked with the British blues band Savoy Brown from 1967 until 1970. He later released several solo albums.

His albums with Savoy Brown are Getting to the Point (1968), Blue Matter (1969), A Step Further (1969), and Raw Sienna (1970). Youlden was not only the vocalist and played piano, but wrote many of their songs, including six out of nine songs on Raw Sienna. He died of bronchial pneumonia on 4 April 2025, at the age of 82.

== Discography ==
- Nowhere Road (1973) – London Spectrum Generic CD 3694 01 Remaster 2003 (Canada)
- City Child (1974) – London Spectrum Generic CD 3693 03 Remaster 2003 (Canada)
- Legend (1979) – London
- Second Sight (1991) – Ruf Records, Line Records
- Matico / Chris Youlden & The Big Picture (2006) – Midnight Records/Littlehorn CD
- Closing Time / Chris Youlden &The Slammers (2018) —The Last Music Company
