= Kim Simmonds =

British musician (1947–2022)

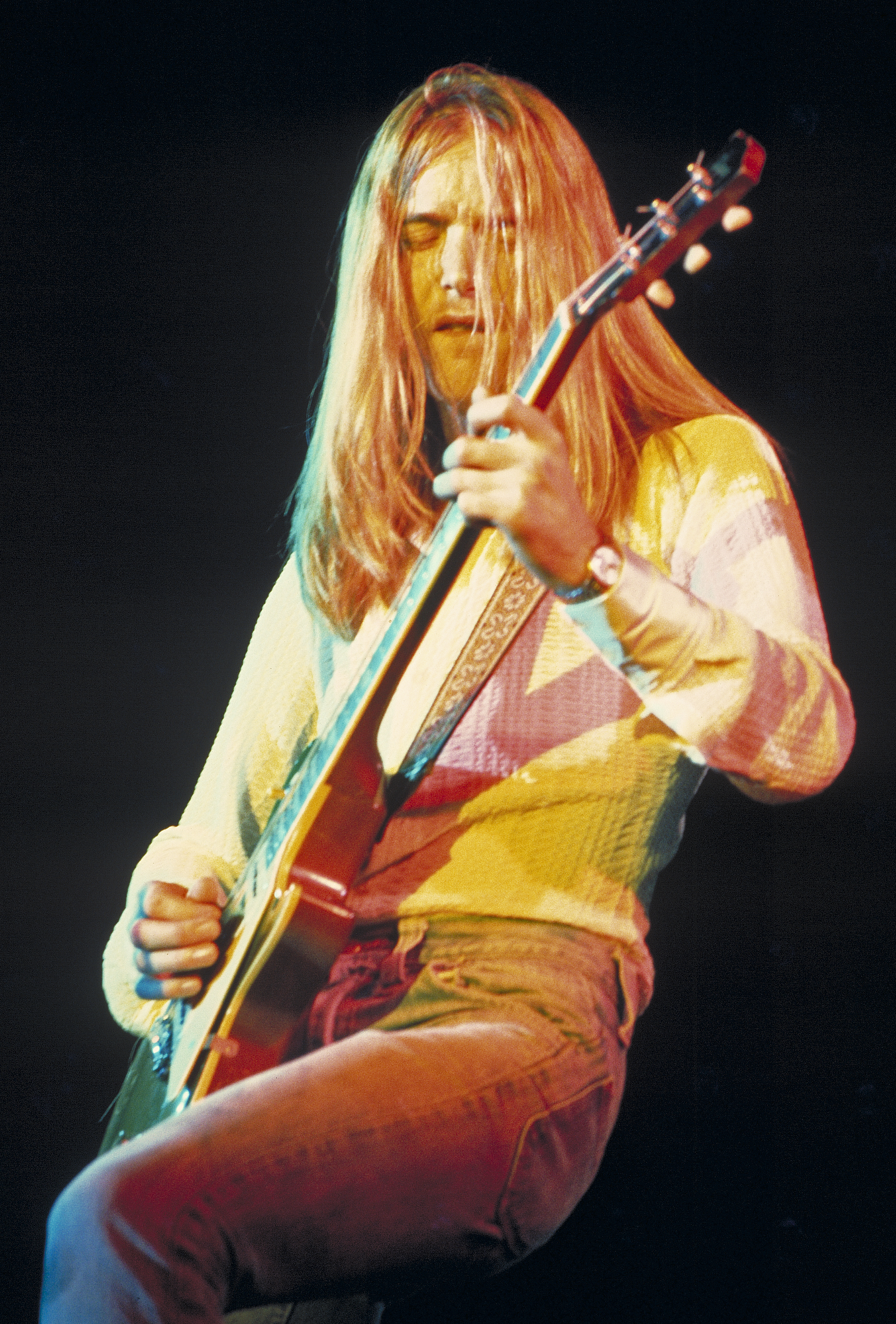
- Simmonds in 1975

Background information
- Birth name: Kim Maiden Simmonds
- Born: 5 December 1947; Newbridge, Caerphilly, Wales
- Died: 13 December 2022 (aged 75); Syracuse, New York, United States
- Genres: Blues rock; blues; hard rock
- Occupation: Musician
- Instruments: Guitar; vocals; harmonica
- Years active: 1965–2022
- Formerly of: Savoy Brown
- Website: savoybrown.com

Kim Maiden Simmonds (5 December 1947 – 13 December 2022) was a Welsh musician. He was the founder, guitarist, primary songwriter and sole constant member of the blues rock band Savoy Brown, which he formed in 1965. Simmonds had led Savoy Brown since its inception, appearing on every Savoy Brown release.

== Career ==
When still a young teenager, Simmonds learned to play from listening to his brother's blues records. Considered one of the architects of British blues, he started the Savoy Brown Blues Band in October 1965, who began playing gigs at the Nags Head in 1966 in London. Early gigs included performing with Cream at Klooks Kleek and accompanying John Lee Hooker.

Live performances led to Savoy Brown signing with Decca. But it was 1969 before its classic line-up gelled around Simmonds, rhythm guitarist Lonesome Dave Peverett, bassist Tony Stevens, drummer Roger Earl, and the monocle- and bowler-wearing vocalist Chris Youlden. That year's Blue Matter and A Step Further albums conjured up at least three classics heard on The Best of Savoy Brown (20th Century Masters/The Millennium Collection): "Train To Nowhere", the live show-stopper "Louisiana Blues" (a Muddy Waters number), and "I'm Tired".

Since its first US visit, Savoy Brown has criss-crossed the country, and "I'm Tired" became the group's first hit single across the ocean. The band would find a greater following in America than in its native England throughout its career.

1970's Raw Sienna followed, featuring "A Hard Way To Go" and "Stay While The Night Is Still Young". When Youlden then departed for a solo career, Lonesome Dave took over the lead vocals. Looking In, also in 1970, featured not only "Poor Girl" and "Money Can't Save Your Soul" but one of the era's memorable LP covers, a troglodyte-like savage staring into an eye socket of a monstrous skull. Later, Peverett, bassist Tony Stevens and drummer Roger Earl left to form the successful but decidedly rock band Foghat. Simmonds soldiered on, recruiting from blues band Chicken Shack keyboardist Paul Raymond, bassist Andy Silvester and drummer Dave Bidwell, and from the Birmingham club circuit the vocalist Dave Walker.

The new line-up was a hit. On stage in America, the group was supported by Rod Stewart and the Faces. On the album Street Corner Talking (1971) and Hellbound Train (1972) launched favourites "Tell Mama", "Street Corner Talking", a cover of the Temptations' Motown standard "I Can't Get Next To You" and the nine-minute epic "Hellbound Train" (decades later Love and Rockets adapted it as "Bound For Hell"). Walker then quit to join Fleetwood Mac, pre-Buckingham/Nicks.

In 1997, Simmonds released his first solo acoustic album, entitled Solitaire. He toured worldwide with various configurations of Savoy Brown. The 2004 live set You Should Have Been There, recorded in early 2003 in Vancouver with Simmonds handling lead vocals – and also as a solo acoustic act. In 2011 he celebrated 45 years of touring with the Savoy Brown album Voodoo Moon.

In 2017, his album with Savoy Brown, Witchy Feeling, reached number one on the Billboard blues charts.

As a soloist and leader of Savoy Brown, Simmonds released over 47 albums through 2016. He was also a painter; the cover of his 2008 solo release, Out of the Blue, featured his original art. In 2008, Simmonds appeared in the documentary film American Music: Off the Record directed by Benjamin Meade, alongside Jackson Browne, Noam Chomsky, Douglas Rushkoff, Les Paul, Johnny and Edgar Winter and countless other musicians and musical acts.

== Health and death ==
On 15 August 2022, Simmonds announced via the Savoy Brown website that he had been receiving chemotherapy for stage four colon cancer. Due to the side effects of his treatment, all scheduled Savoy Brown performances were cancelled. Simmonds died of the disease on 13 December 2022 in Syracuse, New York, at age 75. The news was announced via the Savoy Brown fanpage on 15 December.

== Discography ==
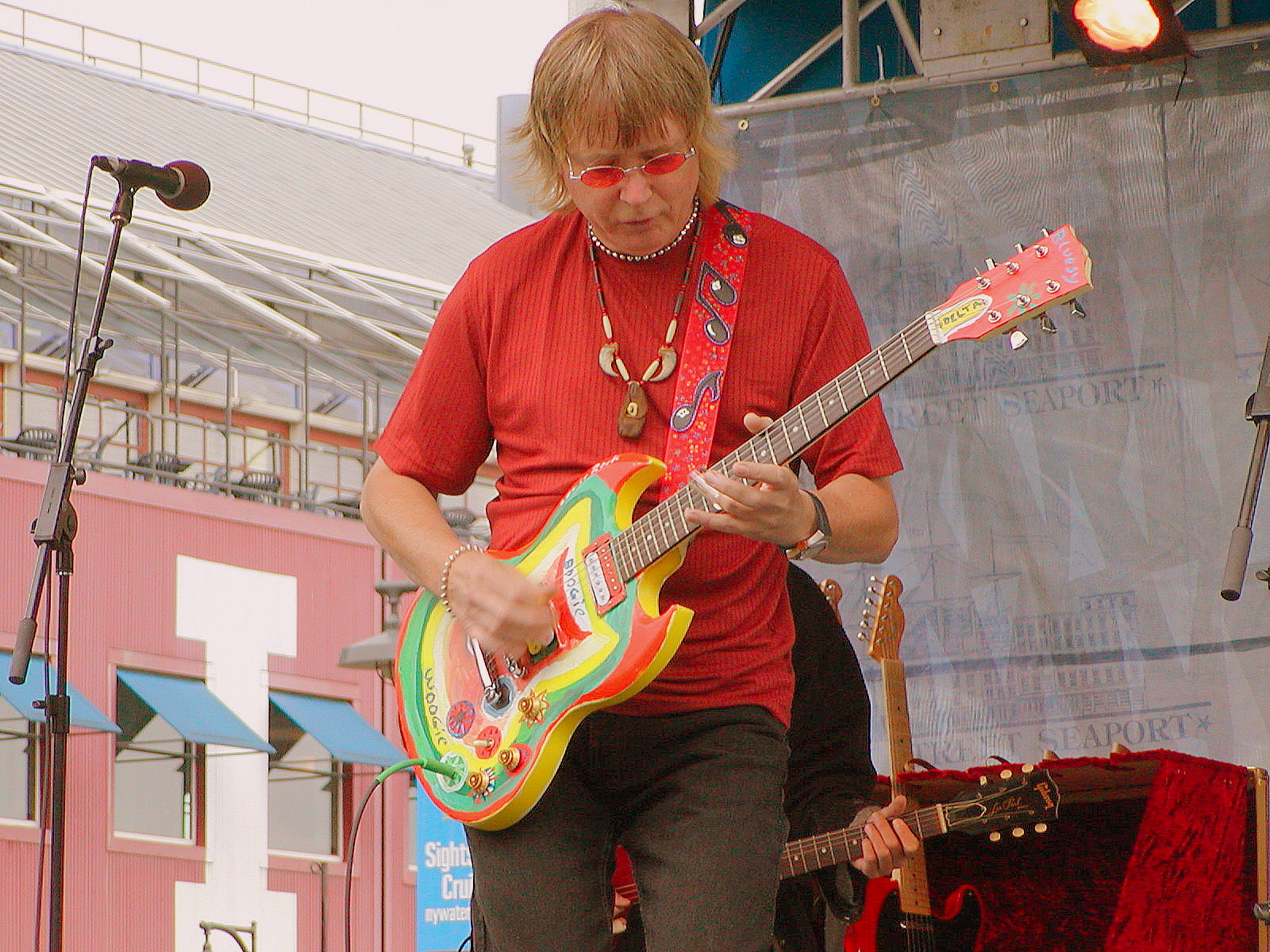
Simmonds performing with Savoy Brown, 2002

=== Solo ===
- Solitaire (1997)
- Blues Like Midnight (2001)
- Struck by Lightning (2004)
- Out of the Blue (2008)
- Jazzin' on the Blues (2015)
