= "Welcome to the LBJ Ranch!" =

Comedy album

- Frank Frazetta artwork shows Earle Doud (left) and Alen Robin playing chess with political figures

Studio album by Earle Doud and Alen Robin
- Released: November 1965
- Recorded: August 25, 1965
- Studios: Fine Recording Studios, New York City
- Genres: Comedy, political satire
- Length: 33:34
- Labels: Capitol Records; W-2423 (monaural); SW-2423 (stereo)
- Producers: Robin–Doud of Sherwood, Inc.

"Welcome to the LBJ Ranch!" is a political satire comedy album by Earle Doud and Alen Robin, released in November 1965 on Capitol Records. The vinyl album uses out-of-context recordings of political figures apparently responding to interview questions fabricated by the comedians. Television comedy writers Earle Doud and Alen Robin conduct some of the "interviews"; other interviewers are news announcers John Cameron Swayze and Westbrook Van Voorhis, with WPIX anchorman John St. Leger, all of whom were recorded speaking questions written by Doud and Robin. Audio tape was edited to bring together the comedy questions and the recordings of political people, with laugh track sound effects added by Bob Prescott.

Produced by Robin and Doud, the album was Doud's followup to the massively popular The First Family comedy album of 1962, featuring Vaughn Meader voicing impressions of John F. Kennedy. The First Family had gained Doud a Grammy Award, but LBJ Ranch was nominated and did not win. Two years later, Doud and Robin made another, similar album titled Lyndon Johnson's Lonely Hearts Club Band, published by Atco Records.

== Production ==
In 1964 when they started the project, Earle Doud and Alen Robin were both veterans of television comedy writing. Doud had written funny lines for Jack Paar, Jackie Gleason, Jonathan Winters, Ernie Kovacs and Johnny Carson, while Robin was a long-time writer on The Tonight Show who had also supplied comedy hooks for Cliff Arquette, Fred Allen and Steve Allen. Doud and Robin were frustrated with the anonymous work of comedy writing, and they were looking for a way to earn greater fame. Doud had already come near stardom when he helped impersonator Vaughn Meader become famous overnight with the 1962 comedy album The First Family, which poked gentle fun at the Kennedy family. Robin said he was searching for a way to make more money; he found it difficult to consort with TV stars in the way they expected of him.

Robin and Doud gathered many recorded interviews of political figures, their collection eventually amounting to 36 miles (58 km) of magnetic tape. They had originally intended to introduce the album earlier but were prevented by the daunting task of editing the recordings. Broadcast announcer Chester Santon later speculated that Robin and Doud first attempted to compile recordings of the Lyndon B. Johnson family alone, but cast their net wider when they did not find enough funny material. Robin and Doud finally settled on an album containing American political figures, which meant they would have to set aside recordings of German rocketry pioneer Wernher von Braun, and Prince Philip of the United Kingdom.

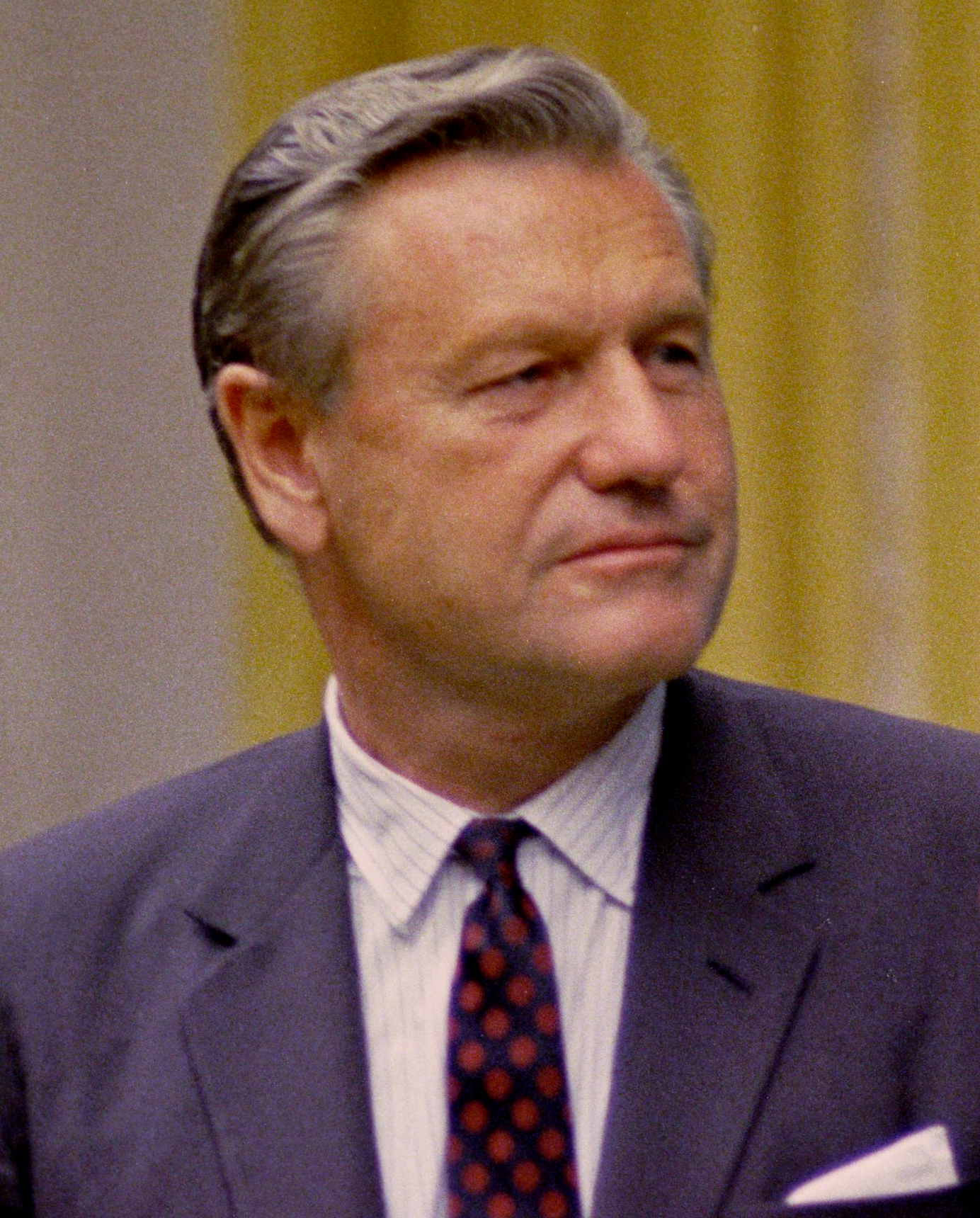
Nelson Rockefeller was "interviewed" on the album

Robin met with Doud nearly every evening for 13 months in Doud's New York City house in the East 60s of the Upper East Side neighborhood, to ferret out the best potential comedy material. They were watched by Doud's pet kinkajou (a small rainforest mammal) which was sometimes intoxicated on alcohol supplied by Doud. They looked for recordings that would fit with the idea of a press conference or interview. Doud said, "We tried to stay away from the tapes of speeches because we wanted the tone which comes only in interviews." They had funny possibilities with words spoken by ex-President Harry S. Truman, but the recording quality was poor, so they decided not to use it. More humorous moments were captured in recordings of Ambassador Adlai Stevenson II, but he died in July 1965, so Doud felt it would be in bad taste to include him. With Truman and Stevenson removed, Doud and Robin's intended balance of five Republicans and five Democrats was reduced to five and three.

By August 1965 the two producers had a script written, and they held a recording session for the announcer voices on August 25, 1965, in New York City. Graphic artist Frank Frazetta prepared eight caricatures of the eight political figures heard on the album. He superimposed the images onto Peter Levy's photograph of Doud and Robin playing chess, such that eight of the chess pieces had caricature heads. The lower right chessboard square contains Frazetta's name.

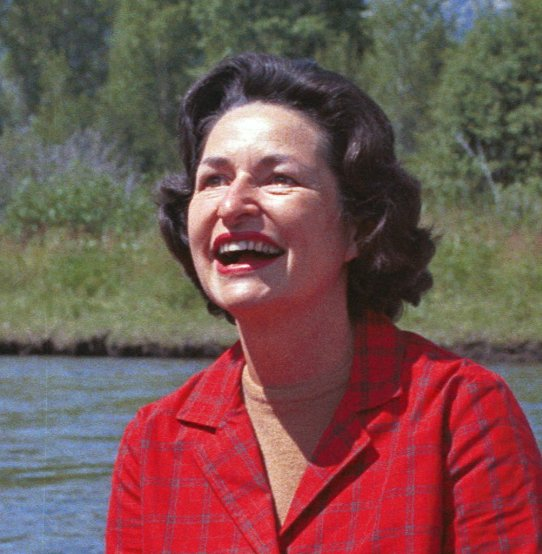
Lady Bird Johnson's greeting was used for the album title.

Doud said that all of the answers heard on the album were taken whole from source material rather than cut up and reassembled word-by-word. The title of the album is a recorded snippet of Lady Bird Johnson conducting a tour of President Lyndon B. Johnson's Texas home which is now a national historic park. Doud and Robin used her voice to answer a comedic question about what the native Americans might have said to Christopher Columbus. Another contrast used for laughs by the writers was wealthy Governor Nelson Rockefeller being asked what he gave his wife for their anniversary, with the recorded reply, "The State of Connecticut and the State of New York...both states and the people in those two states."

== Reception ==
When it came out in November 1965, excerpts from the 33 1/3 rpm, 12-inch microgroove LP were played on US radio stations in many metropolitan areas, which stimulated sales. The album sold so well that Capitol executive Brown Meggs said in November 1965 that they were planning on selling 4 million units through the end of the year, while Cash Box magazine reported they had already sold 5 million. On Christmas Day 1965, Billboard magazine listed "Welcome to the LBJ Ranch!" at number 3 of the top selling LPs in the US, following Whipped Cream & Other Delights by Herb Alpert at number 1, and The Sound of Music film soundtrack album. This was the fifth week LBJ Ranch had been on the chart. The album stayed on the chart for 25 weeks in total.

Cash Box described how some of the larger major metropolitan radio stations were hesitant to broadcast excerpts because of the fear that the material was violating the rights of the politicians. Capitol Records had already given the album to their 40-person legal team who had cleared it as fair use because it was a parody. Radio stations playing the comedy tracks included WMCA in New York, WLS and WCFL in Chicago, WJW in Cleveland, WWDC in Baltimore/Washington, D.C., KJR in Seattle, KLIF in Dallas, and three in Atlanta: WSB, WYZE and WQXI. Meggs said that the album ran into "stiff resistance" from Los Angeles radio stations.

Senator Everett Dirksen, parodied on the album, reportedly bought "stacks" of it to give as Christmas gifts. After the album peaked in December, newly elected New York Mayor John Lindsay hired Doud and Robin to write a funny speech for him to deliver at the annual Gridiron Club dinner in March.

"Welcome to the LBJ Ranch!" was nominated for a Grammy Award in the category of Best Comedy Album. For the 8th Annual Grammy Awards held in March 1966, Doud and Robin were up against albums by Godfrey Cambridge and the Smothers Brothers, and they were competing with Doud's former colleagues from the 1962 album The First Family: producers Bob Booker and George Foster with their new album You Don't Have to Be Jewish. In the end, Bill Cosby won the comedy award for Why Is There Air? The National Association of Recording Merchandisers (NARM) listed LBJ Ranch in a group of six nominated for the Best-Selling Comedy Album of 1965, and Cash Box later reported it certified Gold by the Recording Industry Association of America (RIAA).

== Track listing ==
All interview questions written by Earle Doud and Alen Robin.

Side one

1. Introduction (0:32)
2. First Interview – President Dwight D. Eisenhower (4:15)
3. Second Interview – Senator Robert Kennedy (4:12)
4. Third Interview – President Lyndon B. Johnson (3:58)
5. The Tour – Mrs. Lady Bird Johnson (5:30)

Side two

1. First Interview – Governor Nelson Rockefeller (2:30)
2. Second Interview – Vice President Richard M. Nixon (4:22)
3. Third Interview – Senator Everett Dirksen (5:05)
4. Fourth Interview – Senator Barry Goldwater (3:10)

== Personnel ==
- Interviewers – Earle Doud, Alen Robin, John Cameron Swayze, Westbrook Van Voorhis, and John St. Leger
- Sound effects – Robert "Bob" Prescott
- Photography – Peter Levy
- Artwork – Frank Frazetta
