= Queen of Egypt =

In ancient Egypt, men who married to princesses became king. Most of the time, they have to be one of royal members to get marriage to princesses.

Queen of Egypt may refer to:

- Great Royal Wife, the queen of ancient Egypt
  - List of ancient Egyptian royal consorts
- A female pharaoh, such as Hatshepsut or Cleopatra
- List of consorts of the Muhammad Ali dynasty, the queens of modern Egypt

== See also ==
- Egyptian Queen, a 1969 painting by Frank Frazetta
