= Frank Frazetta =

American illustrator and painter (1928–2010)

- Frazetta's self-portrait in 1962
- Born: Francesco Alfredo Frazzetta; February 9, 1928; Sheepshead Bay, New York, U.S.
- Died: May 10, 2010 (aged 82); Fort Myers, Florida, U.S.
- Education: Brooklyn Academy of Fine Arts
- Known for: Illustration, painting, sculpting
- Awards: Chesley Award (1988, 1995, 1997); Hugo Award (1966); Spectrum Grand Master of Fantastic Art Award (1995); Inkwell Awards Joe Sinnott Hall of Fame (2023)

Frank Frazetta (born Francesco Alfredo Frazzetta /frəˈzɛtə/; February 9, 1928 – May 10, 2010) was an American artist known for themes of fantasy and science fiction, noted for comic books, paperback book covers, paintings, posters, LP record album covers, and other media.

Frazetta was inducted into the comic book industry's Will Eisner Comic Book Hall of Fame, the Jack Kirby Hall of Fame, the Society of Illustrators Hall of Fame, the Science Fiction Hall of Fame, and was awarded a Life Achievement Award from the World Fantasy Convention.

== Early life ==
Born Frank Frazzetta in Sheepshead Bay, New York, located in Brooklyn, to an Italian-American family. Frazetta removed one "z" from his last name early in his career to make his name seem less "clumsy". The only boy in a family with three sisters, he spent much time with his grandmother, who began encouraging him in art when he was two years old. In 2010, a month before his death, he recalled that:

When I drew something, she would be the one to say it was wonderful and would give me a penny to keep going. Sometimes I had nothing left to draw on but toilet paper. As I got older, I started drawing some pretty wild things for my age. I remember the teachers were always mesmerized by what I was doing, so it was hard to learn anything from them. So I went to art school when I was a little kid, and even there the teachers were flipping out.

At age eight, Frazetta attended the Brooklyn Academy of Fine Arts, a small art school run by Italian instructor Michele Falanga. "[H]e didn't teach me anything, really," Frazetta said in 1994. "He'd come and see where I was working, and he might say, 'Very nice, very nice. But perhaps if you did this or that.' But that's about it. We never had any great conversations. He spoke very broken English. He kind of left you on your own. I learned more from my friends there."

Frazetta was a gifted baseball player, and at nineteen received the most valuable player award in his local Parade Grounds League. In 1948 the New York Giants offered him a professional contract, but he declined in favour of a career as an artist.

== Career ==
=== Early work ===
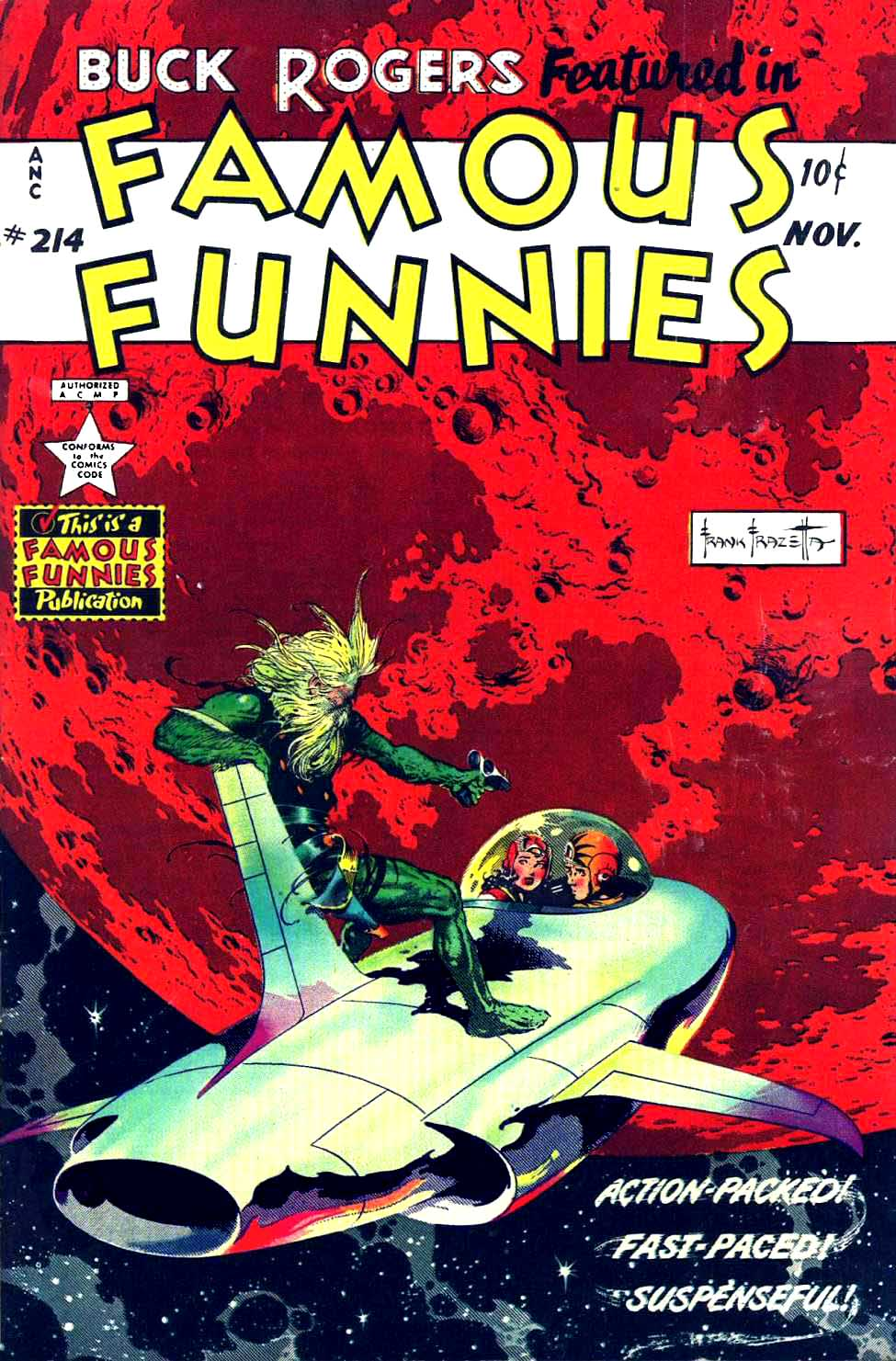
Buck Rogers cover for Famous Funnies number 214 (December 1953).

In 1944, at age 16, Frazetta, who had "always had this urge to be doing comic books", began working in comics artist Bernard Baily's studio doing pencil clean-ups. His first comic-book work was inking the eight-page story "Snowman", penciled by John Giunta, in the one-shot Tally-Ho Comics (Dec. 1944), published by Swappers Quarterly and Almanac/Baily Publishing Company. It was not standard practice in comic books during this period to provide complete credits, so a comprehensive listing of Frazetta's work is difficult to ascertain. His next confirmed comics works are two signed penciled-and-inked pieces in Prize Comics' Treasure Comics #7 (July 1946): the four-page "Know your America" is Frank Frazetta's first "solo" work, and the single page "Ahoy! Enemy Ship!", featuring his character Capt. Kidd Jr. In a 1991 interview in The Comics Journal, Frazetta credited Graham Ingels as the first one in the comic book industry to recognize his talent, and to give him jobs at Standard Comics in 1947.

For Dell's Famous Funnies, Frazetta did war and human interest stories for Heroic Comics, as well as one pagers extolling the virtues of prayer and the evils of drug abuse. In comics like Personal Love and Movie Love, he did romance and celebrity stories.

From 1952 to 1953 he drew the newspaper comic strip "Johnny Comet" for the McNaught Syndicate; despite a name change to "Ace McCoy" in the middle of its run the strip was canceled after a year. In 1954 Frazetta was hired as a member of Al Capp's studio; his primary job was to pencil the "L'il Abner" Sunday page, but he also drew a variety of advertising and editorial art featuring L'il Abner's characters. In interviews later in life Frazetta would say that he had worked for Capp for nine years, but his memory was faulty and he was mistaken. After Frazetta became popular painting paperback covers Capp would say that Frank had only worked for him for several months, but that was equally untrue: Frank Frazetta was part of Al Capp's studio from 1954 to 1961.

He married Massachusetts native Eleanor Kelly in New York City in November 1956. They had four children: Frank Jr., Billy, Holly, and Heidi.

In 1961, after nearly seven years with Al Capp, Frazetta quit in a dispute over money. While employed by Capp he was mostly able to work at home and was paid approximately $400 a month; on occasions when he was needed Frazetta would travel to Capp's Boston studio and be paid an additional $100 a day. In 1961 Frazetta was asked to come to Boston for a short-deadline job, but was told that he would only be paid an additional $50 a day. Frank refused and angrily resigned; he tried to return to comic books but was unsuccessful. He was given some inking work by his friend George Evans before deciding to pursue a career in illustration (though he briefly helped Harvey Kurtzman and Will Elder on three stories of the bawdy parody strip Little Annie Fanny in Playboy magazine).

=== Hollywood and book covers ===
Frazetta in his studio

In 1964, Frazetta's painting of Beatle Ringo Starr for a Mad magazine ad parody caught the eye of United Artists studios. He was approached to do the film poster for What's New Pussycat?, and earned the equivalent of his yearly salary in one afternoon. He did several other film posters.

Frazetta also produced paintings for mass market paperback editions of adventure books. His interpretation of Robert E. Howard's Conan the Barbarian visually redefined the genre of sword and sorcery, and had an enormous influence on succeeding generations of artists. His cover art only coincidentally matched the storylines inside the books, as Frazetta once explained: "I didn't read any of it... I drew him my way. It was really rugged. And it caught on. I didn't care about what people thought. People who bought the books never complained about it. They probably didn't read them."

Primarily, these were in oil, but he also worked in watercolor, ink, and pencil alone. Frazetta's work in comics during this time were cover paintings and a few comic stories in black-and-white for the Warren Publishing horror and war magazines Creepy, Eerie, Blazing Combat, and Vampirella.

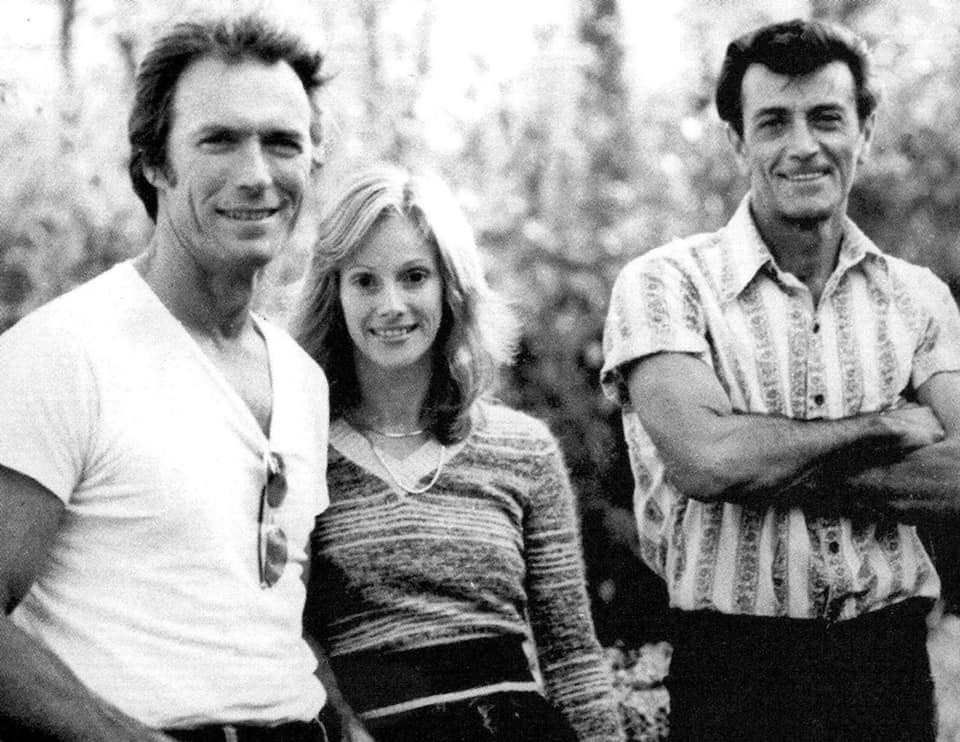
Clint Eastwood, Sondra Locke and Frazetta in 1977

An advertisement for Jōvan Musk, based on his work, was animated by Richard Williams in grease pencil and paint and shown in 1978. The realism of the animation and design replicated Frazetta's artwork. Frazetta and Ralph Bakshi were heavily involved in the production of the live-action sequences used for the film Fire and Ice's rotoscoped animation, from casting sessions to the final shoot. The film was Frazetta's only work in animation, following its release he returned to his roots in painting and pen-and-ink illustrations.

Frazetta's paintings have been used by a number of recording artists as cover art for their albums. The U.S. Army III Corps adopted "The Death Dealer" as its mascot.

In 2009 Kirk Hammett, the lead guitarist for Metallica, bought Frazetta's cover artwork for the paperback reissue of Robert E. Howard's "Conan the Conqueror" for $1 million.

=== Later life and career ===
In the early 1980s, Frazetta created a gallery, Frazetta's Fantasy Corner, on the upper floors of a former Masonic building at the corner of South Courtland and Washington streets in East Stroudsburg, Pennsylvania. The building also housed a Frazetta art museum that displayed both his own work and, in a separate gallery, that of other artists. From 1998 to 1999, Quantum Cat Entertainment published the magazine Frank Frazetta Fantasy Illustrated, with cover art and some illustrations by Frazetta. In his later life, Frazetta was plagued by a variety of health problems, including a thyroid condition that went untreated for many years. A series of strokes left his right arm almost completely paralyzed. He taught himself to paint and draw with his left hand. He was the subject of the 2003 feature film documentary Frank Frazetta: Painting With Fire.

By 2009, Frazetta was living on a 67-acre (0.27 km^{2}; 0.105 sq mi) estate in the Pocono Mountains in Northeastern Pennsylvania, with a small museum that is open to the public. On July 17, 2009, his wife and business partner, Eleanor "Ellie" Frazetta, died after a year-long battle with cancer. For a short period he employed Rob Pistella and Steve Ferzoco to handle his business affairs, but neither still works for the estate.

Shortly after Ellie Frazetta's death in December 2009, Frank Frazetta's eldest son Frank Jr. was arrested on charges of stealing $20 million in paintings from the family museum in a fight over the family fortune. According to the police report, Frazetta Jr, with the help of two men, broke through the museum door using a backhoe and took about 90 paintings. According to the affidavit, Frank Jr. told the responding trooper he had permission from the owner, Frank Frazetta Sr. The trooper called the owner, who said he had not given his son permission to either be in the museum or remove paintings from it.

At issue was whether Frank Jr. believed he had the authority to remove the paintings from the Frazetta museum. Frazetta Sr.'s youngest son Bill Frazetta testified that the paintings belonged to a corporation called Frazetta Properties LLC, of which he shared management duties with his sisters. "I am a manager of the LLC. The art was supposed to stay in the museum", Bill Frazetta said. Frank Jr. maintained that he was trying to prevent the paintings from being sold, per the wishes of his father, who he said had given him power of attorney over his estate. Frank Sr. said he did not understand his son's actions. The Frazetta family later issued a statement on April 23, 2010, that said, "all of the litigation surrounding his family and his art has been resolved. All of Frank's children will now be working together as a team to promote his ... collection of images....".

Frank Frazetta died of a stroke on May 10, 2010, in a hospital near his residence in Florida. Ellie and Frank had a long history of selling art and following his death all of the originals still in his possession were divided equally between his four children.

== Accolades ==
Frazetta received the Hugo Award for Best Professional Artist in 1966; he was inducted into the comic book industry's Will Eisner Comic Book Hall of Fame and was presented with the first Spectrum Grand Master Award, both in 1995, the Jack Kirby Hall of Fame in 1999. and The Society of Illustrators Hall of Fame in 1998. In 2001, he was awarded a Life Achievement Award from the World Fantasy Convention. And in 2014, Frazetta was inducted into the Science Fiction Hall of Fame, and in 2016 into the Album Cover Hall of Fame. In 2023, Frazetta was inducted into the Inkwell Awards Joe Sinnott Hall of Fame.

== Legacy ==
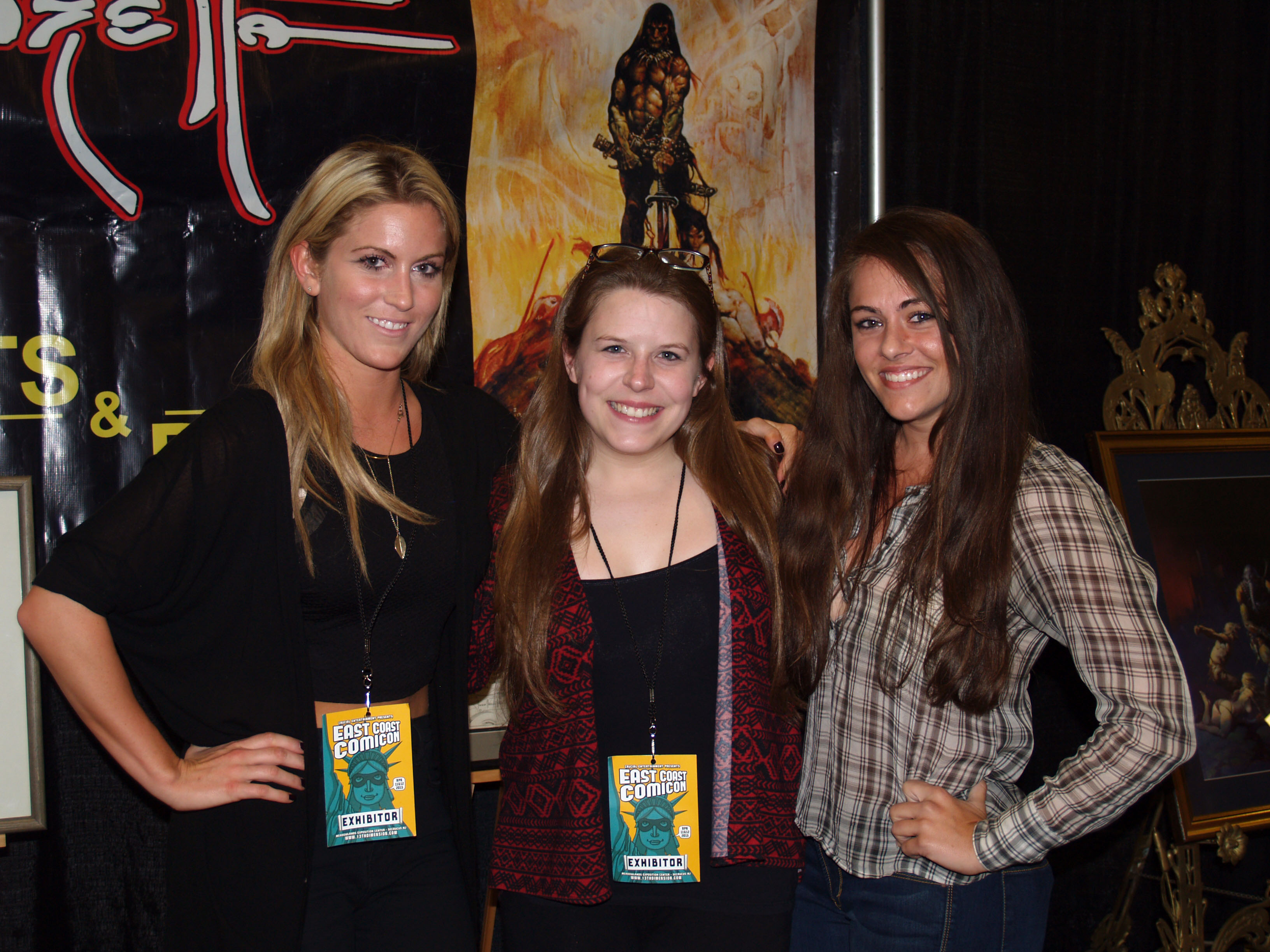
Frazetta's granddaughters (l–r) Brittney Frazetta, Daniele Frazetta and Sara Frazetta Taylor at the 2015 East Coast Comicon in Secaucus, New Jersey

Frazetta has influenced many artists within the genres of fantasy and science fiction. Filmmaker and creator of Star Wars, George Lucas mentions Frazetta's work in a 1979 article by Alan Arnold stating "I'm a fan of comic art. I collect it. ...There are quite a few [contemporary] illustrators in the science-fiction and science-fantasy modes I like very much. I like them because their designs and imaginations are so vivid. Illustrators like Frazetta, Druillet, and Moebius are quite sophisticated in their style". In 2018, Los Angeles' Lucas Museum of Narrative Art, which is scheduled to complete construction in 2026, announced it would display four Frazetta originals from Lucas' personal Frazetta collection.

Oscar-nominated filmmaker Guillermo del Toro said in a 2010 Los Angeles Times article that Frazetta was nothing less than "an Olympian artist that defined fantasy art for the 20th century." Del Toro went on to say "He gave the world a new pantheon of heroes,.... He somehow created a second narrative layer for every book he ever illustrated."

Fantasy artist and musician Joseph Vargo cites Frazetta as a primary influence, and his art calendars since 1998 mark Frazetta's birthday. Chris Perna, art director at Epic Games, stated in an interview in 2011 that Frazetta was one of his influences. Other artists influenced by Frazetta include comics artist such as Marc Silvestri and Shelby Robertson.

Photographer Mark Seliger credits Frazetta for the inspiration of his 2000 portrait photo of Jennifer Lopez.

The face and body paint of professional wrestler Kamala was copied by artist and wrestler Jerry Lawler from a character in a Frazetta painting.

In early 2012, filmmaker Robert Rodriguez announced plans to remake Bakshi and Frazetta's film Fire and Ice. Sony Pictures acquired the project in late 2014, with Rodriguez set to direct. In 2013, Robert Rodriguez displayed Frank Frazetta's original artworks, on loan from the collections of Holly, Heidi, and Bill Frazetta at the Wizard World Comic Con in Chicago. Robert Rodriguez continued his Frazetta artwork tour by showcasing them at the SXSW event in Austin, Texas, in both 2014 and 2015.

Reopened solely by Frank Jr in 2013, the Frazetta Art Museum in East Stroudsburg houses roughly 37 original oils, as well as other pencil, pen and ink, and watercolor works.

As of 2013, Holly Frazetta's collection was traveling throughout the U.S. with public showings at comics conventions. She also co-founded Frazetta Girls alongside daughter Sara Frazetta in 2014. The Frazetta Girls company operates as a web store for official Frank Frazetta merchandise, and has a large social media presence for daily postings of Frazetta's work. Since 2014, Frazetta Girls has also collaborated with modern influential brands such as Primitive Skateboarding, Kid Robot, HUF Worldwide, and Mezco Toyz. In March 2020, Holly Frazetta announced the reopening of the Frazetta Art Museum location in Boca Grande, Florida, by appointment only, featuring original Conan the Barbarian and Death Dealer works. In February 2022 in collaboration with Incendium Online's Opus Publishing arm, the Frazetta Girls announced "Frank Frazetta's Death Dealer" comic series would return, with Issue #1 released worldwide May 10, 2022, spawning the beginning of the FrazettaVerse.

Frazetta's painting Egyptian Queen sold for $5.4 million (£4.2m) on May 16, 2019, at a public auction of vintage comic books and comic art held by Heritage Auctions in Chicago, Illinois, which set a new world record for comic art. On June 27, 2023, Frazetta's Dark Kingdom (1976) was sold for 6 million U.S. dollars through Heritage Auctions, setting a new record for a Frazetta painting and for any fantasy art. On September 12 2025, Frazetta’s iconic Conan (Man Ape) was sold for $13.5 million at Heritage Auctions.

In June 2025, Jesse David Spurlock was sanctioned by the United States District Court for the Middle District of Florida in Frazetta Properties, LLC et al. v. Vanguard Productions, LLC and Jesse David Spurlock (Case No. 8:22-cv-581-WFJ-AEP). The court found that Spurlock had misrepresented a 2015 document as being signed by members of the Frazetta family to falsely suggest a license agreement existed. Forensic evidence confirmed the signatures were not authentic, a fact the defense later admitted. The court determined that Spurlock “fooled the Court (and the lawyers),” reinstated summary judgment in favor of the Frazetta plaintiffs, and ordered Spurlock to pay their attorney fees.

The case stems from a copyright dispute over the use of Frank Frazetta’s “Death Dealer” images in a coffee table art book. In 2022, Frazetta Properties sued Spurlock and Vanguard Productions for unauthorized publication and false claims of licensing authority.

== List of works ==
=== Selected paintings ===
Year and date painted

- Carson of Venus – 1963
- Tales from the Crypt – 1964
- Lost City – 1964
- Land of Terror – 1964
- Reassembled Man – 1964
- Wolfman – 1965
- Conan the Barbarian – 1966
- Conan the Adventurer – 1966
- King Kong – 1966
- Sea Monster – 1966
- Spider Man – 1966
- The Sorcerer – 1966
- Swords of Mars – 1966
- Winged Terror – 1966
- The Brain – 1967
- Bran Mak Morn – 1967
- Cat Girl – 1967
- Conan the Conqueror – 1967
- Conan the Usurper – 1967
- Night Winds – 1967
- Sea Witch – 1967
- Snow Giants – 1967
- Conan the Avenger – 1968
- Rogue Roman – 1968
- Swamp Ogre – 1968
- Egyptian Queen – 1969
- Mongol Tyrant – 1969
- Primitive Beauty / La of Opar – 1969
- Savage World / Young World – 1969
- Vampirella – 1969
- A Princess of Mars – 1970
- Downward to the Earth – 1970
- Eternal Champion – 1970
- The Godmakers – 1970
- Nightstalker – 1970
- Pony Tail – 1970
- The Return of Jongor – 1970
- Sun Goddess – 1970
- Tyrannosaurus Rex – 1970
- Woman with a Scythe – 1970
- Desperation – 1971
- John Carter and the Savage Apes of Mars – 1971
- At the Earth's Core – 1972
- Birdman – 1972
- Creatures of the Night – 1972
- The Silver Warrior – 1972
- Thuvia, Maid of Mars – 1972
- A Fighting Man of Mars – 1973
- Atlantis – 1973
- Black Emperor – 1973
- Black Panther – 1973
- Black Star – 1973
- Conan of Aquilonia – 1973
- The Death Dealer I – 1973
- Flash for Freedom – 1973
- Flying Reptiles – 1973
- Ghoul Queen – 1973
- Gollum – 1973
- The Mammoth – 1973
- Monster Out of Time – 1973
- The Moon Maid – 1973
- Serpent – 1973
- Tanar of Pellucidar – 1973
- Tarzan and the Ant Men – 1973
- Tree of Death – 1973
- Barbarian – 1974
- Flashman on the Charge – 1974
- Invaders – 1974
- Madame Derringer – 1974
- The Mucker – 1974
- Paradox – 1975
- Dark Kingdom – 1976
- Bloodstone – 1975
- Darkness at Times Edge – 1976
- The Eighth Wonder / King Kong and Snake – 1976
- Fire Demon – 1976
- Queen Kong – 1976
- Golden Girl – 1977
- Castle of Sin / Arthur Rex – 1978
- The Cave Demon – 1978
- Kane on the Golden Sea – 1978
- Sound – 1979
- Witherwing – 1979
- The Sacrifice – 1980
- Las Vegas – 1980
- Seven Romans – 1980
- Fire and Ice – 1982
- Geisha – 1983
- The Disagreement – 1986
- Victorious – 1986
- Predators – 1987
- The Death Dealer II – 1987
- The Death Dealer III – 1987
- The Death Dealer IV – 1987
- The Death Dealer V – 1989
- Cat Girl II – 1990
- The Countess and the Greenman – 1991
- Dawn Attack – 1991
- The Moons Rapture / Catwalk – 1994
- Beauty and the Beast – 1995
- Shi – 1995
- The Sorceress – 1995
- The Death Dealer VI – 1996
- From Dusk till Dawn – 1996

=== Album covers ===
Source unless otherwise noted:

- "Welcome to the LBJ Ranch!", 1965 comedy album by Earle Doud and Alen Robin
- Roy Orbison – The Fastest Guitar Alive soundtrack album (1967)
- Herman's Hermits – Both Sides of Herman's Hermits (1966) Front cover watercolor painting, back cover pen-and-ink drawing. Name is misspelled "Frizzeta" in liner notes.
- Dust – Hard Attack (1972)
- Waterhole No. 3 soundtrack album by Roger Miller (1973)
- Nazareth – Expect No Mercy (1977)
- Molly Hatchet – Molly Hatchet (1978)
- Molly Hatchet – Flirtin' with Disaster (1979)
- Molly Hatchet – Beatin' the Odds (1980)
- Yngwie Malmsteen – War to End All Wars (2001)
- Wolfmother – Wolfmother (2006)

=== Movie posters ===
Source unless otherwise noted:

- What's New Pussycat? (1965)
- The Secret of My Success (1965)
- After the Fox (1966)
- Hotel Paradiso (1966)
- The Busy Body (1967)
- The Fearless Vampire Killers (1967)
- Fitzwilly (1967)
- Mad Monster Party? (1967)
- The Night They Raided Minsky's (1968)
- Yours, Mine and Ours (1968)
- Mrs. Pollifax-Spy (1971)
- Luana (1973)
- Mixed Company (1974)
- The Gauntlet (1977)
- Fire and Ice (1983)

== Gallery ==
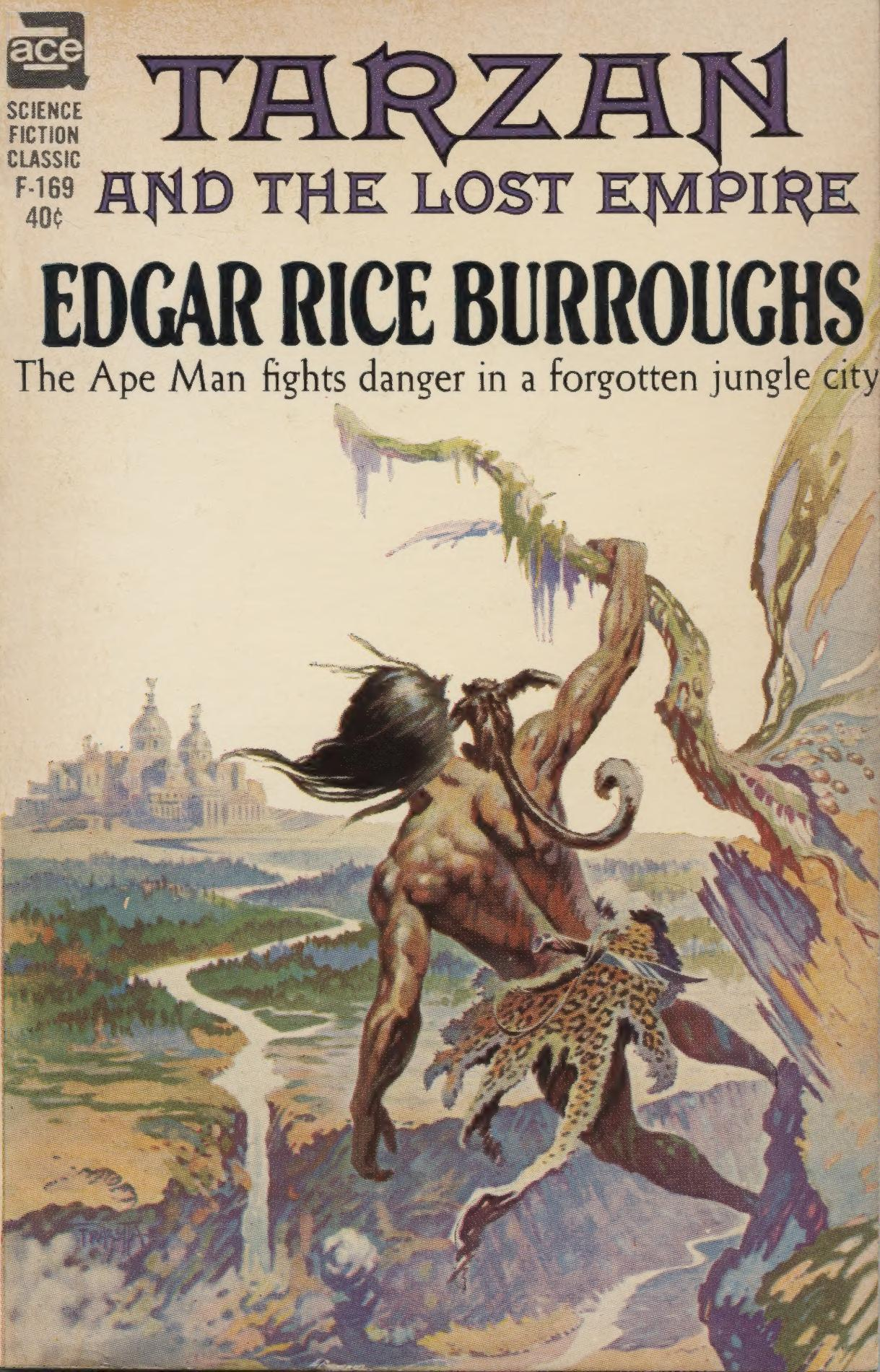
Tarzan and the Lost Empire (1962 cover)

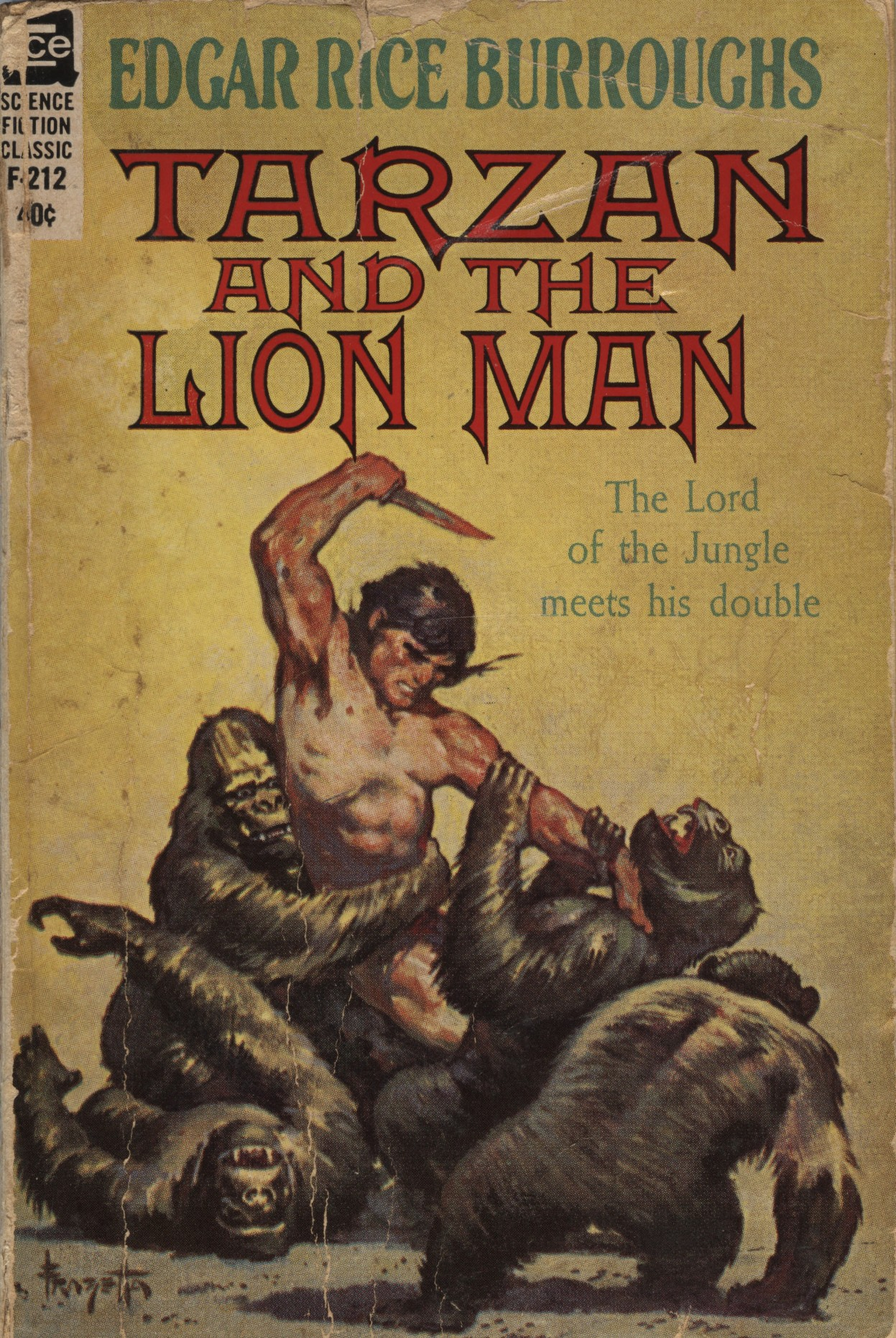
Tarzan and the Lion Man (1963 cover)

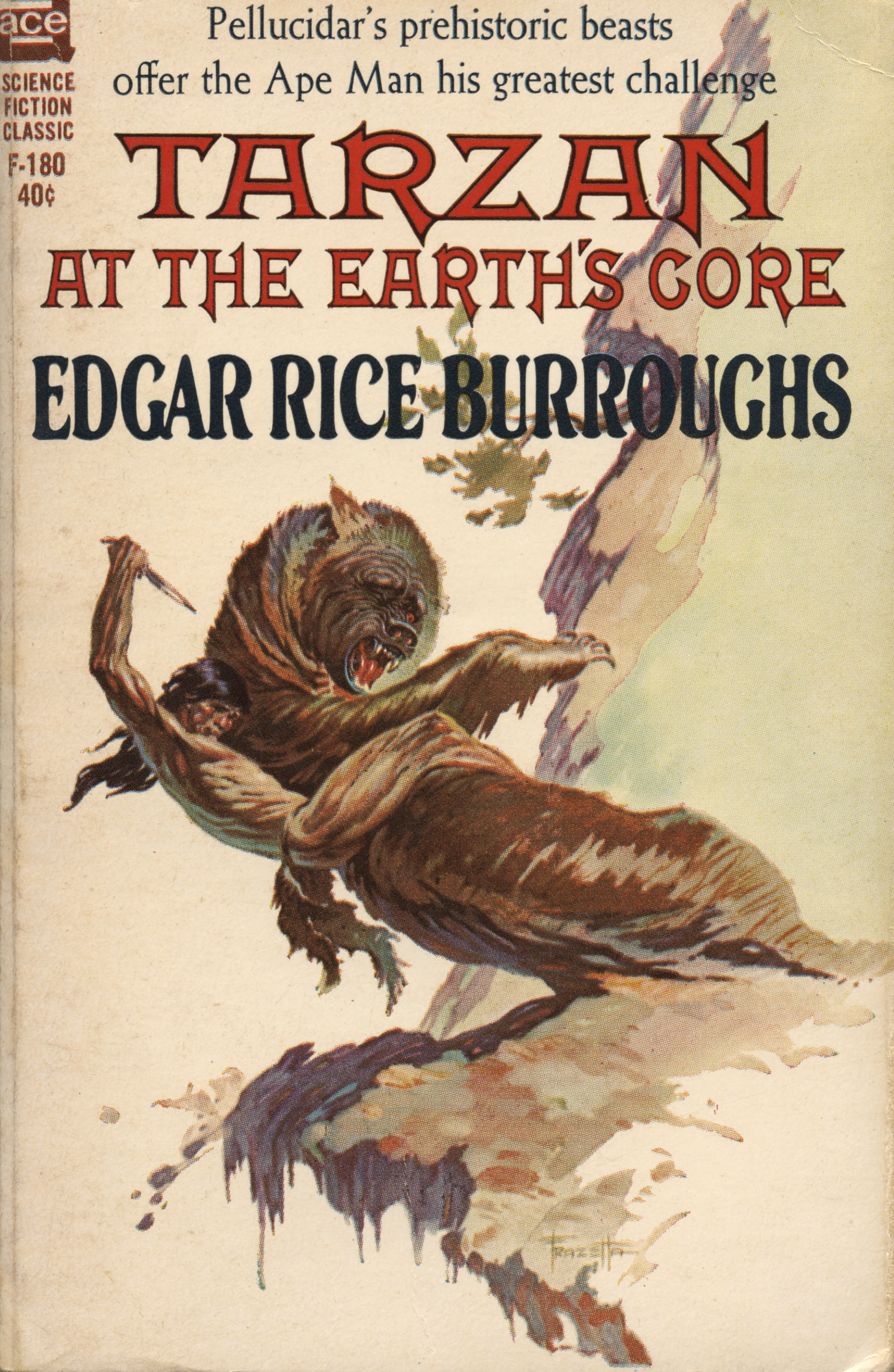
Tarzan at the Earth's Core (1963 cover)

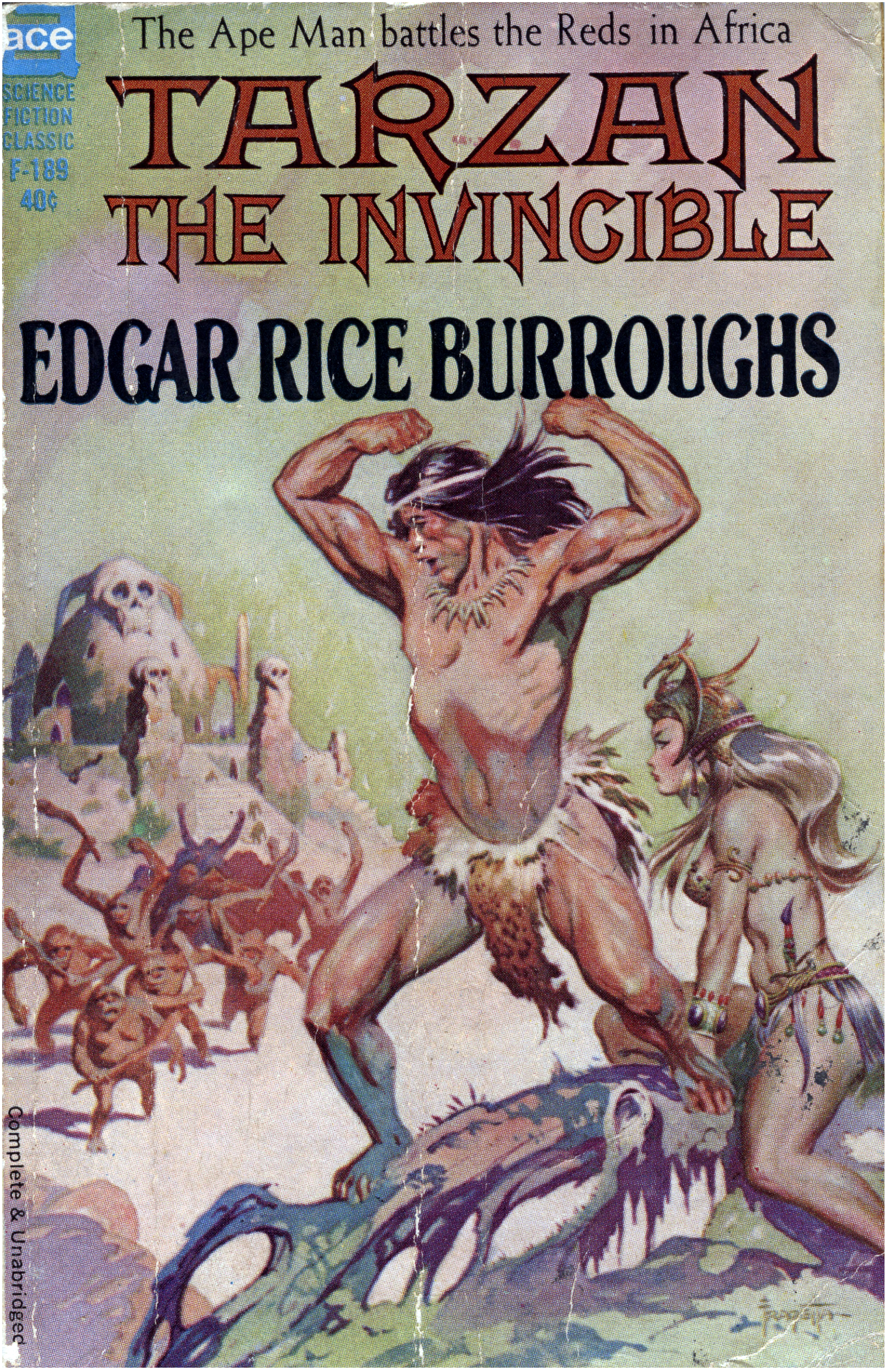
Tarzan the Invincible (1963 cover)

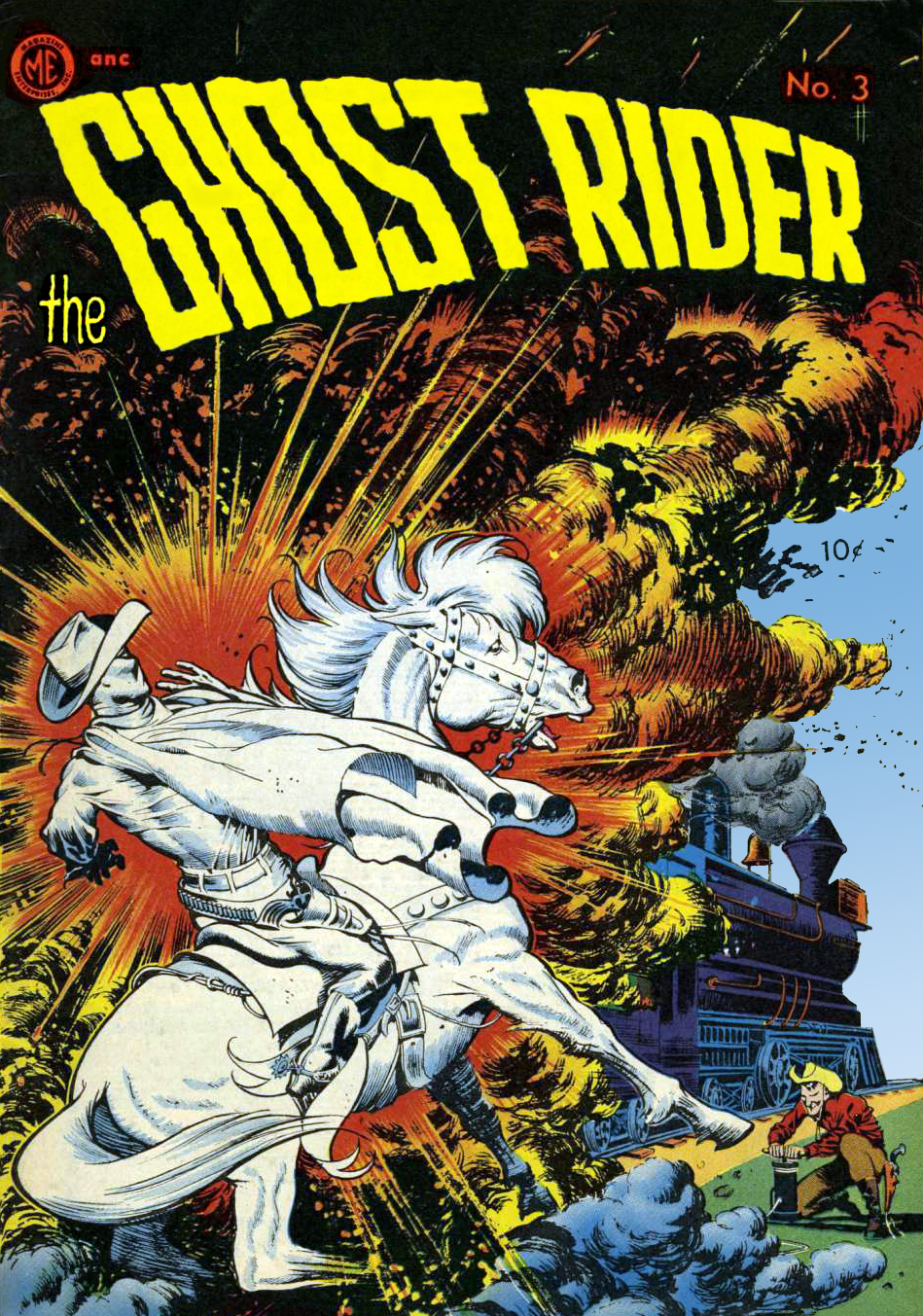
Ghost Rider #3 (1951)

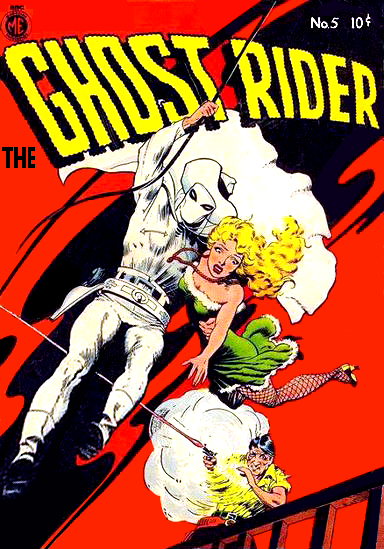
Ghost Rider #5 (1951)

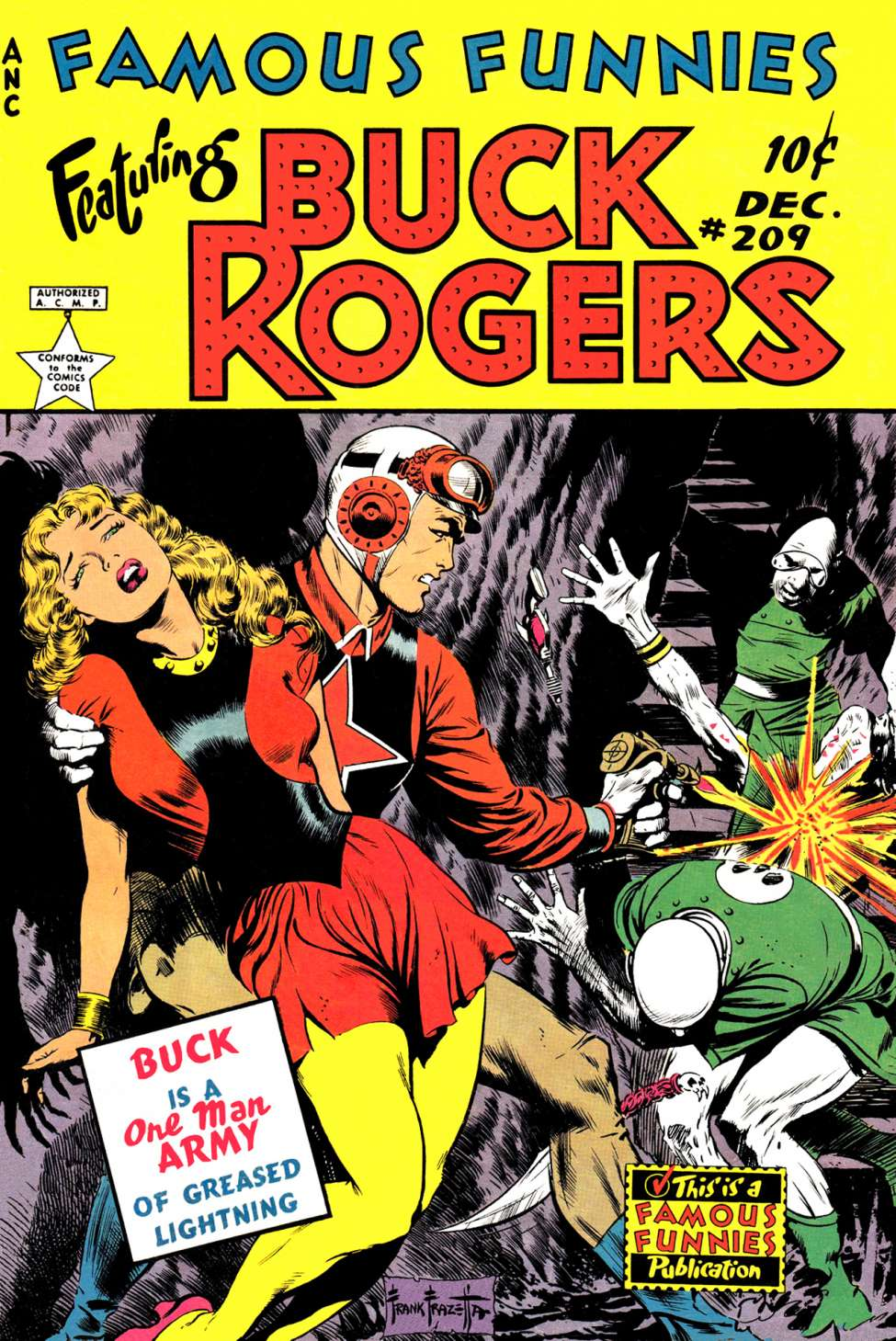
Buck Rogers in Famous Funnies #209 (1953)

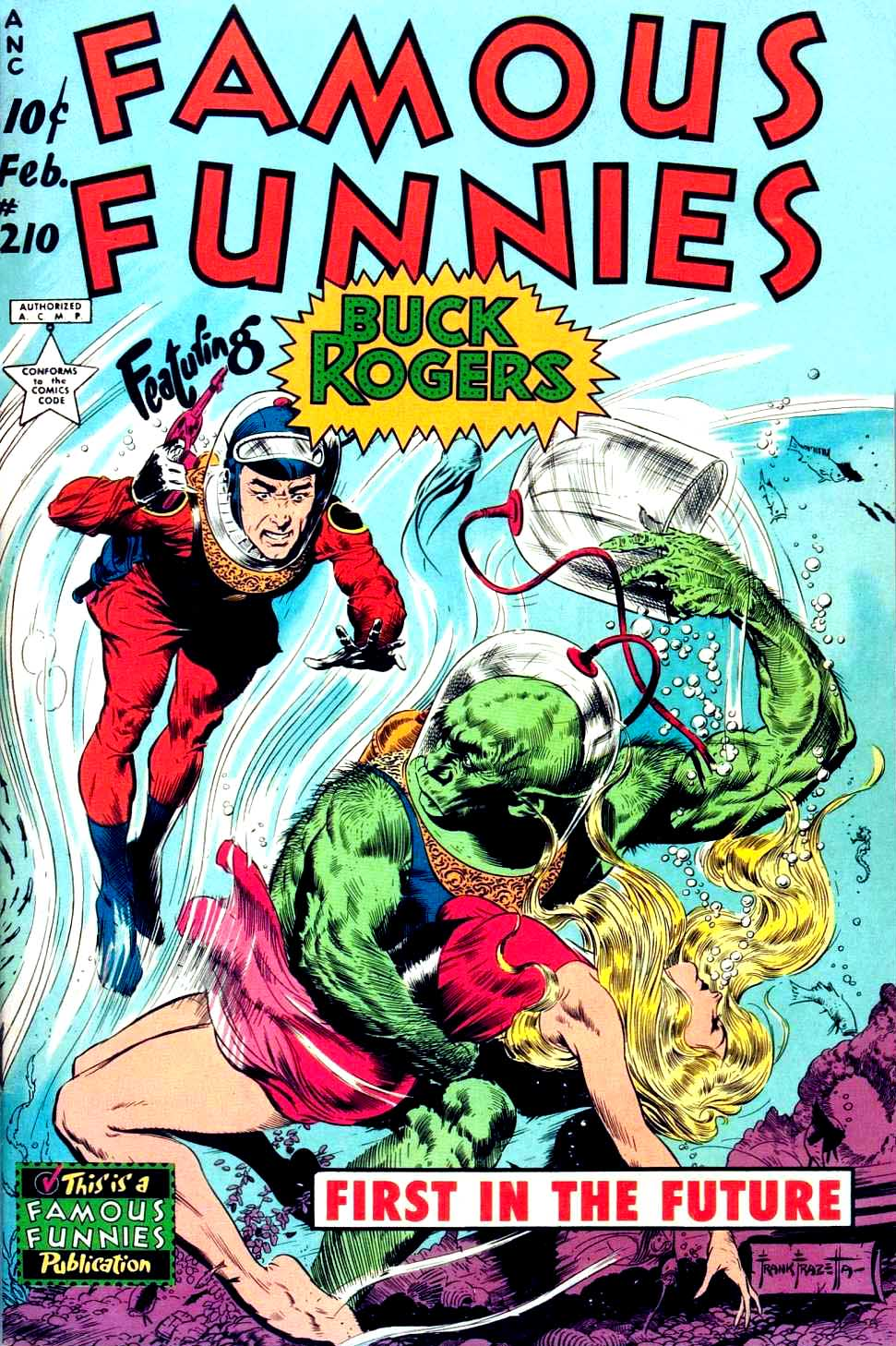
Buck Rogers in Famous Funnies #210 (1954)

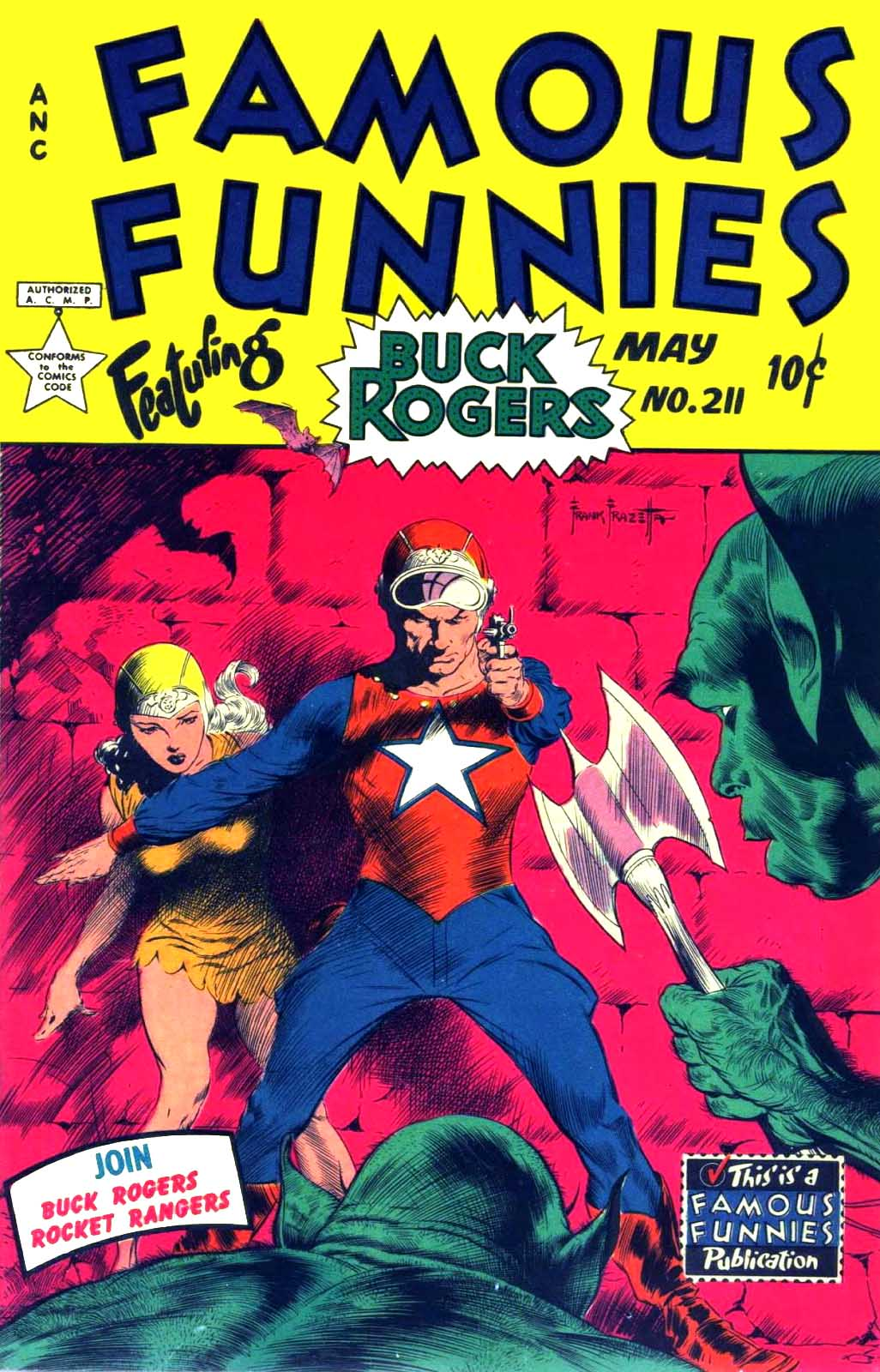
Buck Rogers in Famous Funnies #211 (1953)

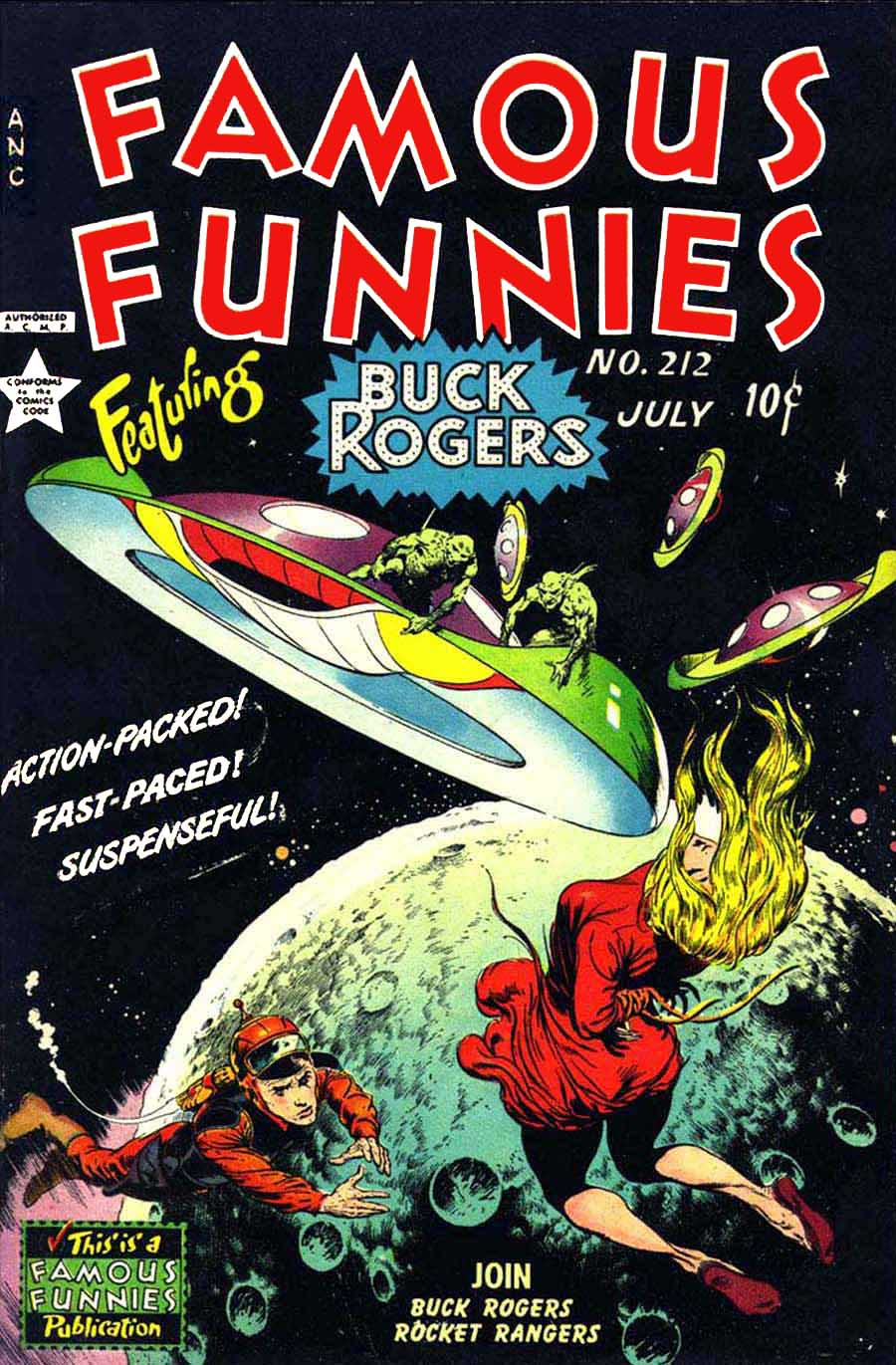
Buck Rogers in Famous Funnies #212 (1954)

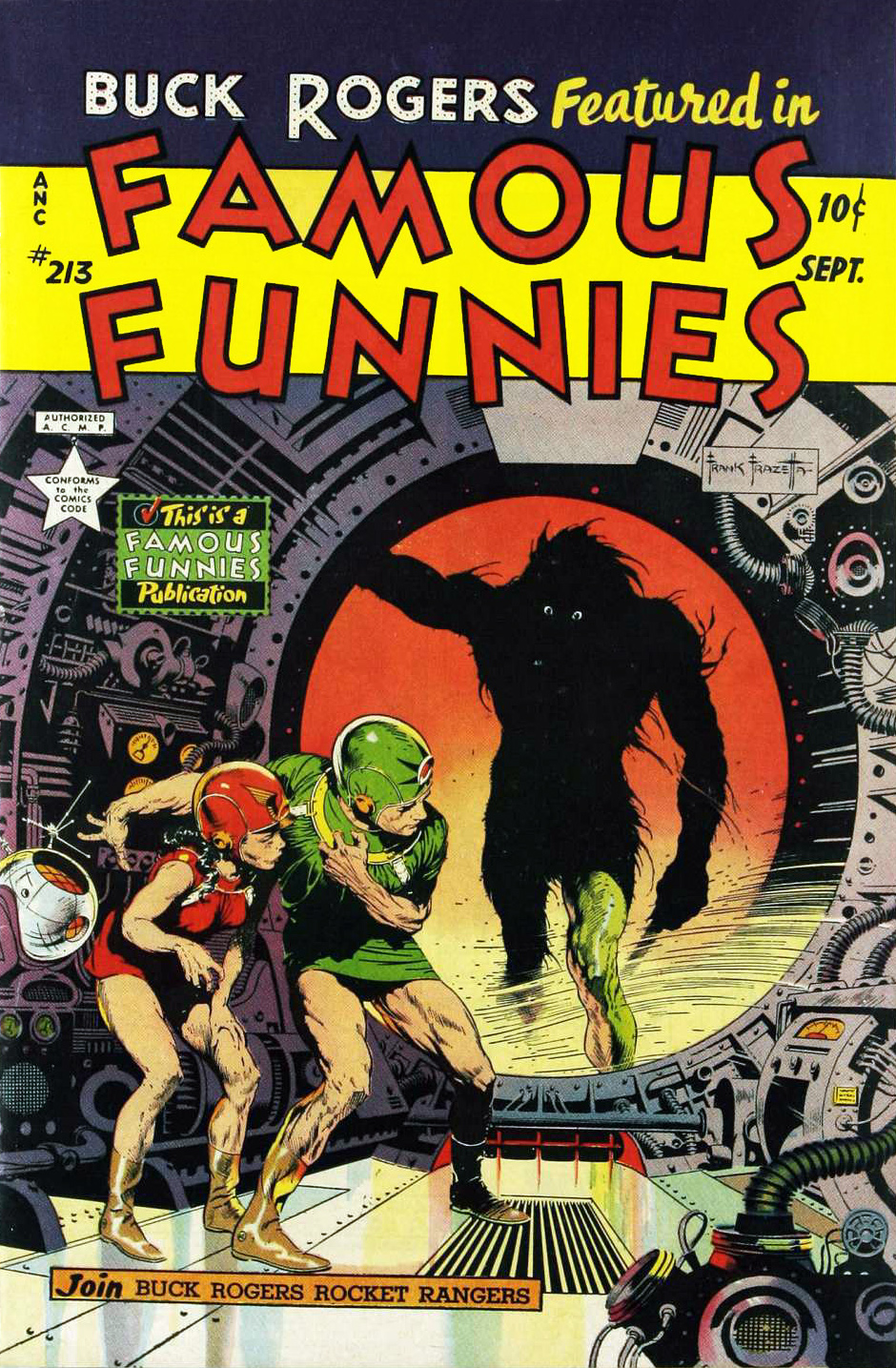
Buck Rogers in Famous Funnies #213 (1954)

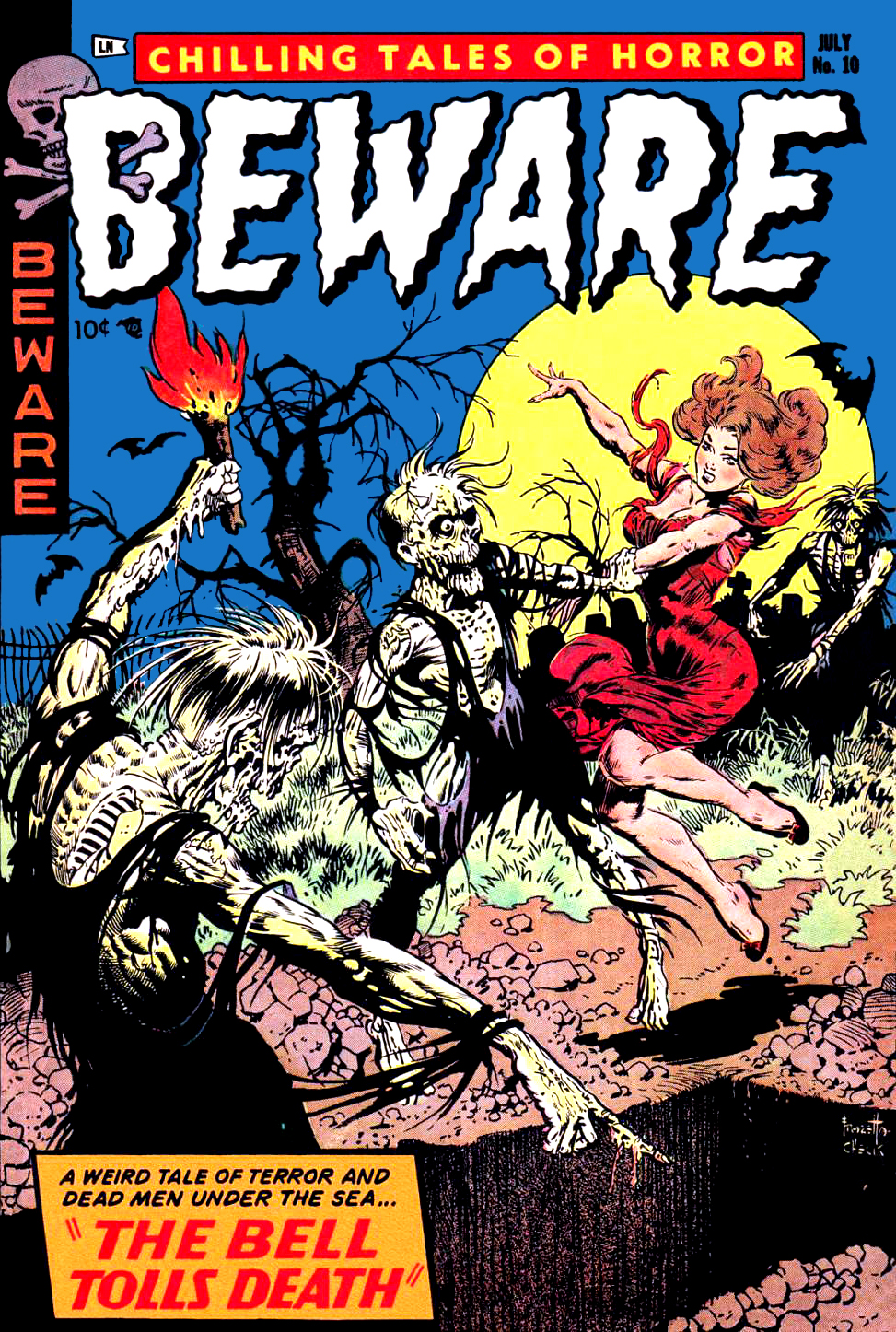
Beware #10 (1954)

== Sources ==
- Frazetta, Jr., Frank (2013). Herman, Daniel (ed.). Frank Frazetta: Art and Remembrances. New Castle, Pennsylvania: Hermes Press. ISBN 978-1-61345-055-0.
