= Annette Sanders =

American jazz musician

- Born: Annette Benbasset; March 25, 1938 (age 88); New York, NY, U.S.
- Occupations: Jazz vocalist; studio singer
- Years active: 1963–present
- Spouse: Morty Lewis (m. 1965; died 1990)
- Children: Michelle Lewis, Jonathan Lewis

Annette Sanders (born March 25, 1938) is an American jazz vocalist and studio singer. She is the mother of singer-songwriter Michelle Lewis.

== Early life and career ==
Born Annette Benbasset in the Bronx, New York City on March 25, 1938, Sanders was one of four children born to Turkish immigrants Celia Lomita and Joseph Benbasset, the latter a self-described "salesman [of] sporting goods" who would soon achieve great success as a clothing designer, earning a seat on the Board of Directors of the National Skirt and Sportswear Association. He was also active in the Central Sephardic Community of America, Inc., where he later served as treasurer.

After attending Hunter College, Sanders first attracted national attention in 1963 as one of the first performers booked at The Rat Fink Room, Jackie Kannon's fledgling comedy club. "Among the new talent Kannon brought in," observed columnist Louis Sobol, "was a winner named Annette Sanders who looks something like Barbra Streisand and sings very much like in her manner." Variety's review likewise highlights the Streisand influence, but adds:

[B]ut there are moments in which Miss Sanders comes through for some good all-around results. Miss Sanders has a fresh personality and her tunes are sometimes angled pixeishly. She doesn't go too far off the beaten path for her numbers, but they are given individual treatment. Ultimately, Miss Sanders will present herself more strongly, and she'll find acceptance on her own terms.

By the following spring, Sanders had appeared in such venues as the hungry I, Mister Kelly's, and the Blue Angel. In April, she shared the bill with Woody Allen at the soon-to-be-renamed Washington, D.C. music club, the Shadows. The following month, patrons at the Crescendo in West Hollywood saw Sanders and a young Bill Cosby open for Tommy Makem and the Clancy Brothers. In December, the Cincinnati Post's Dale Stevens reviewed her performance at Cincinnati's recently opened Playboy Club, commending Sanders' "fine voice control, which gives her an added dimension of dramatics on her ballads, which are her specialty [...] Her approach is one of thoughtful emotion spiced by a high-keyed awareness of the lyrics." On the other hand, Variety, assessing Sanders' performance the previous month at Houston's Tidelands nightclub, observes:

Young thrush can do anything, but probably will excel as a jazz stylist. While she has a way with a ballad, Miss Sanders scores heavily with excellent jazz arrangements by her pianist and arranger Ray Starling. There are no frills about femme. She just stands at mike, usually with eyes closed and lost in mood of tune, and sings. She enjoys singing, and patrons enjoy listening.

By this time, Sanders had been signed to Mercury Records by Bobby Scott, who also provided the tunes and arrangements on her first single, "If My Love Were There" and "Half a Crown.

After appearing twice on The Merv Griffin Show in the fall of 1965, and once on The Tonight Show the following January, Sanders was discovered by Benny Goodman, with whom she performed intermittently over the next five years. May 19, 1966 marked the beginning of the group's first extended engagement, at New York's Rainbow Grill. Reviewing that performance, Down Beat's Dan Morgenstern observed:

Miss Sanders, who has done well for herself in the world of television commercials, has a big, well-controlled voice, good intonation, and an unaffected, straightforward style. Her good conception of time was evident on Broadway, and she showed a pleasant way with a ballad on George Gershwin's Soon.

Meanwhile, Sanders cut another two sides for Mercury in December 1966: "Come To The Masquerade" and "Any Other Way," both from the Off Broadway musical, Man with a Load of Mischief.

Early successes notwithstanding, her marriage in 1965, plus the birth of two children not long thereafter, compelled Sanders to limit her commitments—not merely to Goodman, but to her music career as a whole, which, as a result, was confined almost entirely to studio work for the next two decades. Among the more memorable jingles Sanders performed during those years are "I Love New York", "I'm a Chiquita Banana," and "Turn me loose, Imprévu!" (for Coty Inc.'s Imprévu perfume). Some of the other companies, products and/or places whose praises Sanders sang include Sears, Pathmark, McDonald's, Coca-Cola, Jell-O, and Trump Plaza.

The Time is Right, Sanders' 1986 debut disc, featuring pianist-arranger Michael Abene, guitarist Joe Beck, and her husband, reedman Mort Lewis, was given a brief but emphatic—and empathetic—thumbs-up by the Herald-Sun's R.C. Smith, stressing the album title's autobiographical connotation:

Let's hope that the time is right for this fine singer, another graduate (with Marlene VerPlanck, among others) of the TV jingle camp who can really generate a lyric. The glorious Arthur Schwartz-Dorothy Fields song, Make the Man Love Me, rarely has been sung more simply and unaffectedly than here. Ms. Sanders has an intimate voice, blessedly free of mannerisms.

In 1985, Sanders, along with colleague Arlene Martell and others, formed Group Five, a jazz vocal quintet composed entirely of veteran studio performers. The other original members were Helen Miles, Lenny Roberts and Artie Schroeck, the latter two providing lyrics and musical arrangements, respectively. By 1991, Paul Evans had replaced Schroeck, and by no later than 1997, Miles and Roberts had been succeeded by Holli Ross and Kevin DeSimone. Although no Group Five album was ever released, one of the quintet's later incarnations—with Sanders, Martell, Miles, Evans and Jeff Lyons—was featured on Freddy Cole's 1996 release, It's Crazy, But I'm in Love, providing all background vocals.

== Personal life ==
A longtime resident of River Vale, New Jersey, Sanders was married to tenor saxophonist Morty Lewis from May 1965 until his death in March 1990. The following year, on December 13, at Temple Beth El in Closter, New Jersey, Sanders and pianist Michael Abene performed a Shabbat jazz service in her husband's memory, featuring a setting of Sim Shalom composed by Rabbi Fredric S. Pomerantz. In addition to Sanders, Lewis was survived by their two children, Jonathan and singer-songwriter Michelle Lewis.

== Discography ==
=== As leader ===
- The Time Is Right (Sovereign, 1986)
- On My Way to You (Cabaret Records, 1995)
- Everything I Love (Ripe & Ready, 1998)
- Let's Get Lost (Orchard, 2000)
- No Free Jam (Orchard, 2000)
- You Will Be My Music (Mama Jazz Foundation/Summit Records, 2007)

=== As sidewoman ===
- Various artists – All By Myself, Vol. I (1921–1926) (Monmouth/Evergreen, 1968)
- Various artists – All By Myself, Vol. II (1926–1930) (Monmouth/Evergreen, 1968)
- Various artists – All By Myself, Vol. III (1930–1933) (Monmouth/Evergreen, 1968)
- Rusty Dedrick – Many Facets, Many Friends (Monmouth/Evergreen, 1971)
- Jon Lucien – Rashida (RCA Victor, 1971)
- Harold Dumont – Harold Dumont Sings Duke Ellington (Cleemo, 1975)
- Various artists – Say It With Music (Monmouth/Evergreen, 1978)
- Various artists – The Wiz (OST) (Motown, 1978)
- Meco – Pop Goes The Movies (Arista, 1982)
- Leslie Pearl – Words and Music (RCA, 1982)
- Various artists – Christmas In The Stars: Star Wars Christmas Album (RSO, 1982)
- Arnie Lawrence – Arnie Lawrence and Treasure Island (Doctor Jazz, 1983)
- Michael Davis – Heroes (Voss, 1991)
- Benny Goodman – Yale Archives—Volume 6: Rainbow Grill '66 and '67 (MusicMasters, 1991; rec. 1966)
- The Glenn Miller Orchestra – In the (Christmas) Mood (LaserLight, 1991)
- Wynton Marsalis – Portraits by Ellington (Columbia, 1992)
- Gloria Estefan – Christmas Through Your Eyes (Epic, 1993)
- The Glenn Miller Orchestra – In the (Christmas) Mood II (LaserLight, 1993)
- Sal Salvador – The Way of the Wind (JazzMania, 1994)
- Various artists – Burning for Buddy: A Tribute to the Music of Buddy Rich (At1antic, 1994)
- Various artists – Bullets Over Broadway: Music From the Motion Picture (Sony Classical, 1994)
- Various artists – Mighty Aphrodite: Music From the Motion Picture (Sony Classical, 1995)
- Michael Jackson – HIStory: Past, Present and Future, Book I (Epic, 1995)
- Freddy Cole – It's Crazy, But I'm in Love (Hip Pocket, 1996)
- Benny Goodman – The King Of Swing – Volumes 6–10 (1996, MusicMasters; rec. 1966)
- Ray Starling, Joel Kaye – Alternate Routes (Tantara, 1996; rec. 1965)
- Michael Jackson – Blood on the Dance Floor: HIStory in the Mix (Epic, 1997)
- Steve Ross – I Won't Dance! ...Fred & Cole (Ligeti, 1997)
- The Glenn Miller Orchestra – In the Nutcracker Mood (LaserLight, 1997)
- Various artists – Burning for Buddy: A Tribute to the Music of Buddy Rich, Vol. 2 (At1antic, 1997)
- Various artists – Everyone Says I Love You (OST) (RCA Victor, 1997)
- Chuck Mangione – The Feeling's Back (Chesky, 1999)
- Joe McMahon Jr. – Secondhand Heart for Sale: The Songs of Joe McMahon Jr. (Sharla, 1999)
- Various artists – There's No Place Like Hollywood (OST) (Ducy Lee, 2003)
- Walt Levinsky – Walt Levinsky in Concert: As He Wanted to Be Remembered (Arbors, 2003)
- Various artists – Salute: The World War II Tribute Album (Curb, 2005)
- Mike Berkowitz and the Gene Krupa Orchestra – Thinking of Gene (Sea Breeze, 2007)
- Various artists – Jazz at Token Creek 2009 : Songs of Jimmy van Heusen (Token Creek Recordings, 2010)
- Various artists – Jazz at Token Creek 2004 : Harold Arlen & Vernon Duke (Token Creek Recordings, 2020; rec. 2004)

== Filmography ==
Film
Year	Title	Role	Notes
1994	Bullets Over Broadway	Vocalist (Three Deuces)	
1995	Mighty Aphrodite	Chorus	
1996	Everyone Says I Love You	Helen Miles Singer	

Television
Year	Title	Role	Notes
1965	The Clay Cole Show	Self	1 episode
1965	ABC's Nightlife	Self	1 episodes
1965	The Merv Griffin Show	Self	2 episodes
1966	The Tonight Show	Self	1 episode
1994	The Life and Adventures of Santa Claus	Chorus	
