= You Don't Have to Be Jewish =

Studio album by Various
- Released: 1964
- Recorded: 14 June 1964
- Genre: Comedy
- Producer: Bob Booker; George Foster

Professional ratings
Review scores
Source	Rating
Record Mirror	3/5 stars

You Don't Have to be Jewish is a 1965 comedy album written by Bob Booker and George Foster, the team behind the 1962 comedy album The First Family.

== Production ==
The album features Lou Jacobi, Betty Walker, Jack Gilford, Joe Silver, Jackie Kannon, Bob McFadden, Frank Gallop, and Arlene Golonka, in a variety of roles, mostly Jewish, performing a mixture of jokes and comedy sketches. The album was recorded with a live audience, as the cast performed a script, like a radio play.

== Reception ==
The album was highly successful, with syndicated columnist Walter Winchell calling the album "the No. 1 seller in Suburbia" and noting that as a popular gift "it has replaced the fountain pen at Bar Mitzvahs."

== Sequel ==
A sequel, When You're in Love, the Whole World is Jewish, largely reunited the original cast but replaced the unavailable Golonka with her roommate, Valerie Harper, who was not herself Jewish but frequently played Jewish characters.

== Name ==
"You Don't Have to be Jewish to love Levy's" was an advertising campaign for Levy's rye bread that began in 1961 and ran through the 1970s.

== Track listing ==
Side one
No.	Title	Performers	Length
1.	"A Call From Long Island"	Walker, Golonka	2:43
2.	"Home From the Office"	Jacobi, Walker	0:50
3.	"The Reading of the Will"	Gilford, Jacobi, Kannon, Golonka, Walker	3:22
4.	"The Diamond"	Golonka, Walker	1:20
5.	"Quickies: The Astronaut / The School / The Confession"	Gilford, Walker, McFadden, Golonka, Kannon, Jacobi	1:36
6.	"The Jury"	Gallop, Jacobi, Golonka, Walker	1:55
7.	"The Presidents"	Silver, McFadden, Gilford	1:28
8.	"The Cocktail Party"	Gallop, Jacobi	0:37
9.	"Final Discussion"	Jacobi, Walker	1:24
10.	"More Quickies: Cry for Help / Panic / Two Husbands"	Jacobi, Walker, Gallop, Kannon	1:21

Side two
No.	Title	Performers	Length
11.	"The Convicts"	McFadden, Kannon, Silver, Gilford	1:31
12.	"The Housewarming"	Golonka, Gilford, Walker	1:03
13.	"The Luncheon"	Golonka, Walker	1:47
14.	"Still More Quickies: The Storm / The Newspaper Reporter / The Home Remedy"	Gilford, Jacobi, Kannon, Gallop, Walker	1:41
15.	"Conversation in the Hotel Lobby"	Jacobi, Walker	1:13
16.	"The Agony and the Ecstacy"	Walker, Golonka	0:31
17.	"My Son, the Captain"	Kannon, Jacobi, Walker	0:58
18.	"Secret Agent, James Bondstein"	Gallop, Gilford, Jacobi, Silver, Walker, Kannon	5:46
19.	"Enough Already With The Quickies: Dinner / The Elevator / Classified Ad, Israeli Style"	Walker, Kannon, Golonka, Gilford	1:34
20.	"Goldstein"	Silver, Gilford, Gallop	1:47
