= Bob Booker (writer) =

American writer and producer (1931–2024)

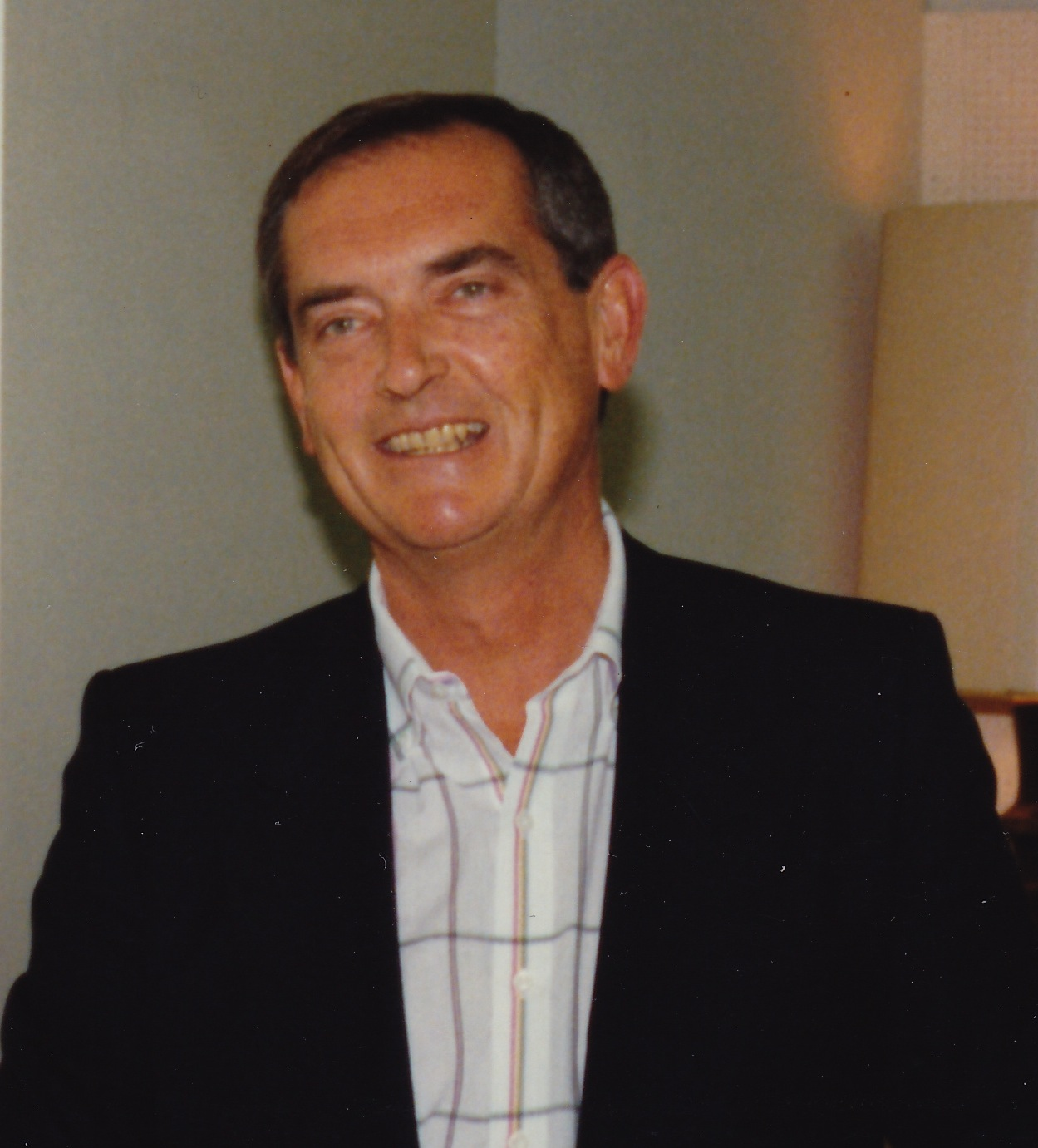
- Booker in 1986
- Born: August 1, 1931; Jacksonville, Florida, U.S
- Died: July 12, 2024 (aged 92); Tiburon, California, U.S.
- Occupations: Television producer; writer
- Years active: 1948–2024
- Known for: The First Family album
- Spouse: Barbara Noonan Booker
- Children: 2

Bob Booker (August 1, 1931 – July 12, 2024) was an American writer and producer of television shows and record albums. He is best known for producing the 1962 album The First Family with Earle Doud. The album is a parody of President John F. Kennedy and his family, and it both remained at #1 on the Billboard 200 for 12 weeks and won a Grammy for Best Album of the Year in 1963.

== Early career ==
Booker was born in Jacksonville, Florida, on August 1, 1931. He graduated from high school at age of 16. He was first employed as a local radio DJ. A new television station began operation and Booker was hired at the age of 18, where he worked as a TV host, news anchor, weatherman, camera operator, set builder, film editor, program producer and director. He was later drafted into the army during the Korean conflict and was stationed at Ft. Bliss in El Paso. Because of his background in radio and television, he was placed on staff for the commanding general, doing PR for the base. Discharged after two years, he moonlighted as a talent manager and became station manager of WIVY in Jacksonville.

In 1958, Booker was hired by Miami's WINZ AM radio for their afternoon drive slot. He ingratiated himself with all the top entertainers who frequented the popular winter vacation spot through one-on-one interviews. Celebrities like Jack Benny, Nat Cole, Martha Ray, Andy Williams, Ray Charles, Mort Sahl, Ava Gardner, Gloria DeHaven, Sinatra - many became lifelong friends. He also did on-air work at two local TV stations, and hosted weekend shows. In 1960, he left Miami and relocated to New York City.

== New York City ==
Booker discovered it was not easy to start a career in the Big Apple, as an MCA agent got him exactly one TV pilot hosting job in one year. He made friends with local writers, including Pat McCormick (who later wrote for Johnny Carson) and Earle Doud. He and Doud began some writing projects, which included a series of gag record greeting cards, an article for Playboy magazine and their ultimate brainchild: a comedy album spoofing the President of the United States.

Booker and Doud cast Vaughn Meader, who they saw via the Talent Scouts TV show, as JFK and Naomi Brossart, a model and actress, as Jackie. They cut a demo record and made their first pitch to Capitol Records. After hearing the demo, an executive and friend of Booker, said: "I wouldn't touch it with a 10-foot pole!" Dejected, the two considered other labels and ended up at ABC Records who referred them to ABC President Leonard Goldenson. He passed because of FCC concerns, but suggested a small record label, Cadence Records, owned by Archie Bleyer. Bleyer liked the concept and signed the two writers to a record deal.

Cadence wanted to release the record in November 1962, in time for the busy holiday season. Booker did not like the stock photos being offered for the album cover, so he borrowed a Speed Graphic camera and flew to Washington, D.C. to photograph the White House. He only had four negatives. His first shot of the North Portico had terrible backlighting. He then took a cab around the entire perimeter and attempted two more pictures, but those shots did not capture the essence of the building. Frustrated, he went back to the front fence where the lighting had improved, held the camera between the slats and without looking through the lens, pulled the trigger. The photograph would become iconic (nominated for Best Album Cover by the Grammys).

The night before the recording, Booker and Dowd went to the Paris Theater on East 58th to catch a movie. Earle carried a copy of their script in a briefcase. As they waited for the film to begin, two women took their seats two rows in front of them. One was Jackie Kennedy. The two men were flabbergasted. Dowd immediately opened the briefcase and wanted to show the First Lady their script. He was dying to meet her. Booker kept him at bay and told him it was a crazy idea and could jeopardize their project. Dowd finally relented and they left the theater.

On October 22, 1962, The First Family was recorded at Fine Studios in New York City, ironically at the same moment that President Kennedy announced the naval blockade of Soviet Union ships traveling to Cuba, prompting the Cuban Missile Crisis. Because social media did not exist, the audience was unaware of the speech. The recording commenced and was a success. Unfortunately, Cadence Records owner Archie Bleyer felt "Kennedy's going to war" and almost tossed the tapes in the trash. Bob and Earle felt the opposite and proceeded to finalize the production. Six days later, the crisis was averted and Blyer gave the green light.

Booker and Doud devised a simple plan to market their record: radio airplay. Booker also worked part-time for 1010 WINS AM and when the first albums were delivered to Cadence, the two immediately drove to Columbus Circle and sought out one of the most popular DJs in the city, Stan Z. Burns at WINS. Burns loved the record and The First Family was the only record he played for his entire three-hour shift. The WINS switchboard lit up with callers — listeners, news outlets and competing radio stations — everyone wanted the new record. Booker and Doud, who came armed with a handful of records, took cabs around the city, dropping off albums to numerous radio stations. Booker remembered it best: "Lightning had struck...we were in the right place at the right time." It would become the fastest selling comedy album in record history.

Arthur M. Schlesinger Jr., assistant to the President, nearly crashed his car when he first heard an album cut on the radio, thinking it was actually his boss: Reporter: What do you think the chances are for a Jewish president? Meader: Well, I think they're pretty good. Let me say, I don't see why a person of the Jewish faith can't be President of the United States. I know as a Catholic I could never vote for him, but other than that...

In December, Booker got a call from White House UPI correspondent, Merriman Smith. The reporter told him about an 'off the record' experience with the President during a recent Cabinet meeting. Booker recalled Smith said, "The President came in, ran down the items on his agenda and then said, 'But, before we begin -- and he opens up a record player, picks up a copy of your album and said 'I'd like for you to hear my album." He told Booker the cabinet sat and listened to the entire record, laughing as the president laughed. Everyone applauded when the album was done. Astonished, Bob remembers Smith added, "I know there's been some negativism from Pierre Salinger and Schlesinger and some of those guys but Jack doesn't listen to them. You've made a human being out of him...he loves it."

With the success of their album, Booker and Dowd felt it was time to settle an old score. They took a cab down to a lumberyard and purchased an eleven-foot wooden pole. Since it would not fit into a cab, the two carried it down the street, trudging up 6th Avenue to 58th, home of Capitol Records. They walked the pole up seven flights of stairs and then affixed their album with a yellow ribbon to its end. The duo entered a suite of offices and asked for a certain record executive, offering to give him an eleven-foot pole since he would not touch their album idea with a ten-footer a few months before.

Booker and Doud produced a second album, The First Family Volume Two, in the spring of 1963. After President Kennedy was assassinated that November, all unsold albums were pulled out of stores and destroyed. The producers did not want to appear to be profiting from the President's death.

== Later career ==
Booker continued to produce albums with George Foster, including the very successful 1965 album You Don't Have to Be Jewish and When You're in Love, the Whole World is Jewish. He produced 16 comedy albums from 1962 to 1977.

Booker wrote for The Garry Moore Show during the late 1960s and also contributed to The Ed Sullivan Show, as well as other variety programs. When Hollywood came calling, he relocated to Los Angeles and produced the motion picture The Phynx in 1970. He returned to television and produced numerous TV shows from the 1970s to the 1990s, including The NBC Follies and Fifty Years of Country Music. He partnered with Burt Reynolds, producing two network pilot specials: Cotton Club '75 and The Wayne Newton Special. In 1977, Paramount hired him to create television specials to promote their feature film releases: American Hot Wax, Foul Play and Grease. In 1987, Booker created the syndicated teen fantasy sitcom Out of This World starring Maureen Flannigan and Donna Pescow. He produced numerous "outtake" shows and established an extensive comedy videotape library for his shows Foul-Ups, Bleeps & Blunders with Don Rickles and Steve Lawrence, Comedy Break and The Hit Squad. He would continue to market the TV library globally for decades.

== Personal life and death ==
Booker donated many of his personal television scripts to the Writers Guild Foundation Archive. The original master tapes of his albums The First Family and The First Family Volume Two were donated to President John F. Kennedy's library in Boston at the request of Caroline Kennedy and are on display in the library, along with a Gold Album of the first album.

Booker lived in Northern California with his wife of 55 years, Barbara Noonan Booker, who partnered and co-produced programming with her husband on the four major networks and in syndication. During the final years of his life, Booker continued working on a variety of projects, following his grandfather's advice that one should "never retire"; he was working on a prospective project until days before his death from heart failure at his home in Tiburon, California on July 12, 2024, at age 92.

== Album work ==
A partial list of his album credits:

- You Don't Have to Be Jewish (1964)
- When You're in Love, the Whole World is Jewish (1965)
- Al Tijuana & His Jewish Brass (1966)
- The Yiddish are Coming! The Yiddish are Coming! (1967)
- The New First Family (1966) (No. 72 US)
- Scream On Someone You Love Today (1967)
- The New First Family 1968: A Futuristic Fairy Tale (1968)
- Beware of Greeks Bearing Gifts (1968) (No. 190 US)
- The Handwriting On the Wall (The Sounds Of Graffiti) (1968)
- Pat McCormick Tells It Like It Is (1968)
- The Jewish American Princess (1971) (No. 183 US)
- Out of the Closet (1977)

== Television work ==
A partial list of his television credits:

- The NBC Follies (1973)
- Cotton Club '75 (1974)
- Charo (1976)
- The Paul Lynde Halloween Special (1976)
- Fifty Years of Country Music (1978)
- Grease Day USA (1978)
- Waylon (1980)
- Christmas Gold (1982)
- The Best Little Special in Texas (1982)
- The Funniest Commercial Goofs (1983)
- Foul-Ups, Bleeps & Blunders (1983–84)
- The Love Boat Fall Preview Special (1984)
- Anything for a Laugh (1985)
- Comedy Break (1985)
- Rickles on the Loose (1986)
- The Hit Squad (1987)
- Out of This World (1987–91)
