= Egyptian Queen =

Painting by Frank Frazetta

- Artist: Frank Frazetta
- Year: 1969
- Medium: Oil on canvas
- Dimensions: 65 cm × 50.2 cm (25.5 in × 19.75 in)
- Location: Private collection

Egyptian Queen is a painting by Frank Frazetta, made in 1969 for the cover of the horror-comic magazine Eerie. It depicts a near-nude woman leaning against a column, accompanied by a leopard on the floor and a bare-chested man in the background. The painting is among Frazetta's most famous and has been popular as a poster. The woman's face on the original magazine cover is different from later reproductions after Frazetta chose to repaint it. The original painting was sold in 2019 for 5.4 million U.S. dollars, which set a new world record for comic art. It was surpassed in 2023 by another Frank Frazetta work (Dark Kingdom), which sold for 6 million U.S. dollars.

== Background ==
The American painter and illustrator Frank Frazetta (1928 – 2010) had a successful career in comic books and newspaper comic strips in the 1950s and early 1960s. From the mid-1960s he primarily created fantasy cover art for books and comic magazines. He was highly successful and influential within the field and many of his cover images became popular as posters. From 1964 to 1972, he created cover art for James Warren's horror-comic magazines Creepy and Eerie. Frazetta later described this work as a turning point in his career and his happiest time. He said Warren did not pay much, but Frazetta was allowed to do anything he wanted and his work received very positive response.

Egyptian Queen was made for the cover of Eerie #23 in 1969. Frazetta said he finished the painting in a day and a half, but was unsatisfied with the woman's face and kept repainting it for three additional days. Still unsatisfied, and feeling blinded by having looked at the image so much, he submitted the painting to the magazine. When it was returned to him a couple of months later he redid the face again and was finally satisfied. The face on the magazine cover is therefore different from the one on the extant painting and later reproductions.

== Subject and composition ==
The setting of Egyptian Queen is a palace interior. The upper left part of the image is illuminated and shows a near-nude woman who looks toward the viewer and leans against a thick stone column. Her eyes are painted with kohl and she wears a plumed headdress, a minimal and swirly shaped cover for her large breasts, and a long, blue and green cloth attached to her hips. Below the column is a short set of stairs covered by a carpet with a papyrus flower pattern. At the foot of the stairs is a crouching leopard, wearing a collar attached to a chain that hangs loose on the floor. In the background to the right, in a darker part of the picture, is a bare-chested and muscular man who wears a headcloth and carries a drawn scimitar. Egyptian Queen is painted in oil on stretched canvas. The image area is 25.5 in × 19.75 in (64.8 cm × 50.2 cm).

== Reception ==
Egyptian Queen is one of Frazetta's most famous, reproduced and influential works. It has been popular as a poster and other painters have created tributes to it. In his book about the history of horror comics, Richard J. Arndt says the painting deserves its high status and attributes its appeal to a "dynamic use of lighting and shadow (along with some nicely done near-nudity)".

J. David Spurlock writes in his book Fantastic Paintings of Frazetta (2020) that the revision of the woman's face changes the purpose of Egyptian Queen. The face on the magazine cover looks frightened and tells a story of how the wild cat is about to attack the queen, making the picture suitable for the cover of a horror magazine. According to Spurlock, Frazetta then repainted the face to look as beautiful as possible, which reveals an ambition to turn the painting into fine art. In a 2015 doctoral dissertation, Nicole McCleese writes that the woman staring toward the viewer does not look helpless or threatened. McCleese counts Egyptian Queen to the minority of Frazetta's depictions of women where this is the case, grouping it with Tiger Woman (a.k.a. Sun Goddess, 1970) and Sun Goddess (a.k.a. Savage Pellucidar, 1972), which also appear to show women in control of big cats. In 2020, Andrew Firestone of Screen Rant called Egyptian Queen a "tremendous example" of Frazetta's ethic. He wrote that the composition directs the viewer to gradually discover a narrative and interpreted the queen as the person in power in the scene, which for Firestone provides both a "brilliantly imagined and executed" sexual metaphor and a mystery regarding its meaning. In 2023, Egyptian Queen was licensed as the artwork for the initial printing of the card Courtesan Thaïs in the collectible card game Sorcery: Contested Realm.

== Provenance ==
Eerie #23 was published by Warren Publishing in September 1969 with Egyptian Queen on its cover. The magazine included a comic inspired by the painting, titled "Beyond Nefera's Tomb", with a script by Bill Parente and art by Ernie Colón. The comic is eight pages long and tells the story of a sorceress in ancient Egypt who tries to become immortal. Warren reused Egyptian Queen for the cover of Creepy #92 in 1977. The painting has appeared on the covers of paperback novels and music albums. It is the cover image of the art books The Fantastic Art of Frank Frazetta (1975) and Fantastic Paintings of Frazetta (2020).

The original painting belonged to Frazetta's family until it was sold through Heritage Auctions on May 16, 2019. The buyer paid 5.4 million U.S. dollars, which set a new world record for a Frazetta painting and for original comic-book art sold at a public auction. The previous record for a Frazetta painting was held by Death Dealer 6 (1990), which sold for 1.79 million U.S. dollars in May 2018. Egyptian Queen also set a new record for the highest price for any item sold at Heritage Auctions. In June 2023, Frazetta's Dark Kingdom (1976) was sold for 6 million U.S. dollars, beating Egyptian Queen's previous record for fantasy art.
