= Brooklyn Academy of Fine Arts =

Art school in Brooklyn, New York (1923–1945)

Coordinates: 40.69131°N 73.99131°W

Information
- Established: 1923
- Closed: 1945

The Brooklyn Academy of Fine Arts, originally known as the Leonardo da Vinci Art School, was a small, short-lived art academy located at 85 Court Street in the New York City borough of Brooklyn. The sole instructor at the academy was Michele Falanga. The school closed in 1945.

== History ==
Michele Falanga was born in Naples and studied in Rome. He emigrated to the United States in 1901.

In 1923, Falanga founded the Leonardo da Vinci Art School in the Brooklyn borough of New York City. It later became the Brooklyn Academy of Fine Arts and was based at 85 Court Street.

== See also ==
- Culture of New York City
- Education in New York City
- List of art schools
