= Jackie Kannon =

Canadian comedian

Kannon as shown on the cover of the comedic pamphlet Mother Kannon Advises on Manners, Morals, & Decorum

Jackie Kannon (July 25, 1926 – February 1, 1974) was a Canadian stand-up comedian, club entrepreneur, and publisher. With his printer Alexander Roman, he founded the publisher Kanrom, which published primarily humorous materials, including The New York Times best seller JFK Coloring Book. His night club The Rat Fink Room has been cited as "America's first comedy club".

== Early life ==
Kannon was raised in Windsor, Ontario. His father, a cantor at a local synagogue, died when Kannon was five. He and his six siblings worked to make ends meet, with Kannon working at a family-owned newsstand. His first entertainment gigs were as a singer for radio station CKLW when he was seventeen. He attended (but did not graduate from) Assumption College.

== Comedy ==
Kannon started in comedy in 1947 as the emcee at Club Top Hat in Detroit, where he worked for two years until his off-color material drew the attention of the Censorship Division of the local police, at which point the club fired him rather than draw further attention. He was later hired for a two week gig at Detroit's Gay Haven Club, which paid $450 for week. That gig turned into becoming a house comedian there, netting him $2000 per week by the time he left. He went on to have a local TV show on Detroit's WXYZ-TV. After that, he toured, getting booked in such places as the Coconut Grove (Los Angeles) and The Flamingo Casino (Las Vegas) and on the Borscht Belt before getting a room of his own.

== The Rat Fink Room ==
Kannon created the New York City comedy club The Rat Fink Room, which has been described as “the first dedicated stand-up comedy club on planet earth” in 1963. (Columnist Dorothy Kilgallen called his choice of a name "evidence that it's a sick world we live in".) The Room, which sat 120, opened in 1963 on the second floor of Morris Levy's Roundtable club on East 50th Street. While the club was successful for years, some financial weaknesses with both it and Levy caused it to have what was intended as a temporary closure in 1969. Kannon used that time to try an unsuccessful run in Las Vegas. He returned to that room later in the year, but it did not survive for long after that.

In 1971, Kannon ran a Rat Fink Room in the Deauville Hotel in Miami.

Kannon opened a new New York City Rat Fink Room in 1972, above the restaurant Sam's on the corner of Second Avenue and East 64th Street. The room sat 240, significantly more than the original.

== Publishing ==
Kannon got into publishing with lithographer Alex Roman in 1958; they named their publishing line Kanrom, a portmanteau of their names. By 1966 they had published 50 titles and were grossing $1.5 million per year. Their publishing was almost exclusively humorous in nature, with the sole exception being Once There Was a President, a children's biography of American President John F. Kennedy. Their first publication was a humorous planner, the Daily Dilly. Their biggest hit was JFK Coloring Book. This satirical adult coloring book illustrated by Mad magazine artist Mort Drucker spent 12 weeks on the New York Times bestseller list and moved about a half million copies before being taken out of print in the wake of the president's assassination. Other publishing efforts included a series of books meant to be hung in the bathroom with an attached chain, starting with Poems for the John. Mad magazine artist Sergio Aragonés drew two series of cartoon booklets for them: the Sam, the Ceiling Needs Painting featured couples in the midst of sex depicted solely by the soles of their feet, while the Fanny Hillman series depicted the Jewish head of houses of prostitution.

Kanrom parodied the format of the popular Peanuts book Happiness is a Warm Puppy three times, with Happiness is a Rat Fink (1963), Unhappiness is a Dirty Dog (also 1963), and Insecurity is Better Than No Security at All (1969). They parodied the Peanuts strip directly with the 1971 release of Oh, No! Charlie Green!.

There were reports in late 1966 that the publisher was breaking up due to conflicts between Kannon and Roman over the latter's wanting more credit as publisher.

== Works ==
Kannon performed on the comedy sketch album You Don't Have to Be Jewish and its follow-up, When You're in Love, the Whole World is Jewish.

He produced an album of comedy by people serving time in prison, Prose from the Cons.

== Personal life ==
Kannon and his wife Lynn (whom he married circa 1947) had four boys. He died on February 1, 1974, apparently of a heart attack.
