= Vaughn Meader =

American comedian, musician, and impressionist (1936–2004)

- Born: Abbott Vaughn Meader; March 20, 1936; Waterville, Maine, U.S.
- Died: October 29, 2004 (aged 68); Auburn, Maine, U.S.
- Education: Brookline High School
- Occupations: Comedian, impersonator, musician, actor
- Spouses: Vera Heller (m. 1955, divorced); Sheila Colbath (m. 1984)

Abbott Vaughn Meader (March 20, 1936 – October 29, 2004) was an American comedian, impersonator, musician, and film actor.

Meader began his career as a musician but later found fame in the early 1960s after the release of the 1962 comedy record The First Family, written and produced by Bob Booker and Earle Doud. The album spoofed President John F. Kennedy – who was played by Meader – and became the fastest selling "pre-Beatles" album in history and went on to win the Grammy Award for Album of the Year in 1963. At the peak of his popularity, he performed his Kennedy impersonation on television variety shows and in nightclubs around the country and was profiled in several magazines and newspapers.

Meader's career success came to an abrupt end after President Kennedy's assassination on November 22, 1963. Meader's TV and nightclub bookings were all canceled. Producer Bob Booker quickly pulled The First Family records from stores so as not to appear to be profiting from the deceased President. Meader attempted to take his career in a different direction by performing non-Kennedy-related comedy and released a new comedy album, Have Some Nuts!!!, in early 1964. However, sales for the album were low as public interest in Meader had waned. His career never rebounded as he was too closely associated with President Kennedy. Meader eventually returned to his native Maine where he resumed performing music and managed a pub.

Meader is one of the few Billboard-charting artists to have had a number 1 album but never have a single in the Hot 100.

== Early life ==
Meader was born in Waterville, Maine during one of the worst floods ever to hit New England: he often said he was born on "the night the West Bridge washed out". He was the only child of Charles Vaughn Meader, a millworker, and Mary Ellen Abbott. After his father broke his neck and drowned in a diving accident when Meader was only eighteen months old, his mother moved to Boston to work as a cocktail waitress, leaving Meader behind with relatives. A sometimes unruly and troubled child, Meader was sent to live with his mother in Boston at the age of five but she suffered from alcoholism, and placed him in a children's home.

After shuttling among several schools in Massachusetts and Maine, Meader eventually graduated from Brookline High School in 1953. He enlisted in the United States Army and was stationed in Mannheim, West Germany as a laboratory technician. He formed a country music band, the Rhine Rangers, with fellow soldiers, later adding impressions of popular singers to his repertoire. Meader married the German-born Vera Heller in 1955.

== Career ==
Meader began his career in entertainment as a singer and piano player. Upon his return from Germany, he began a comedy act in New York City, where he discovered his skill at impersonating Kennedy. With his New England accent naturally close to Kennedy's familiar, and often parodied, Harvard accent, he needed to adjust his voice only slightly to sound like the President. Meader also mastered the facial expressions that allowed him to bear a passable resemblance to Kennedy.

=== The First Family ===
On October 22, 1962, Meader joined writers Bob Booker and Earle Doud and a small cast of entertainers to record The First Family. The album poked fun at Kennedy's PT-109 history; the rocking chairs he used for his back pain; the Kennedy family's well-known athleticism, football games and family togetherness; children in the White House; and Jackie Kennedy's soft-spoken nature and her redecoration of the Executive Mansion. The First Family became the fastest-selling record in the history of the United States. It sold 1.2 million copies during the first two weeks of its release, and ultimately sold 7.5 million copies.

Kennedy himself was said to have given copies of the album as Christmas gifts, and once greeted a Democratic National Committee group by saying, "Vaughn Meader was busy tonight, so I came myself." At one press conference, Kennedy was asked if the album had produced "annoyment or enjoyment." He jokingly responded, "Annoyment," but continued with "I listened to Mr. Meader's record and, frankly, I thought it sounded more like Teddy than it did me. So, now he's annoyed." Kennedy told Benjamin Bradlee that "parts of it were amusing." Other sources, such as Thomas C. Reeves' A Question of Character: A Life of John F. Kennedy, state that President Kennedy was upset with the parodies, and that First Lady Jacqueline Kennedy was furious, even demanding that the President keep Meader off radio and television. It was the parodies of their children Caroline and John Jr. that Mrs. Kennedy was most upset about.

Still in his 20s, Meader was suddenly famous, rich, and in constant demand. He was profiled in Time and Life magazines, appeared on network television variety shows such as The Ed Sullivan Show, The Jack Paar Program, The Andy Williams Show and Hootenanny. Meader also made a couple of game show appearances, first as a mystery guest on What's My Line on December 30, 1962. The following week, Meader and Naomi Brossart (who played Jackie Kennedy on the "First Family" albums) appeared on To Tell The Truth in which the panel had to guess who the real Naomi Brossart was amongst the three lady contestants.

Though a series of tour dates in early 1963 were notably unsuccessful (Billboard reported that he "bombed" in Pittsburgh, and only 742 people showed up in Philadelphia), he still played to packed houses in Las Vegas. The First Family won the Grammy Award for Album of the Year in 1963. That March, Meader recorded a follow-up album, The First Family Volume Two, a combination of spoken comedy and songs performed by actors and comedians portraying members of the President's family and White House staff. The sequel was released in the spring of 1963, and while not as successful as the first volume, still sold hundreds of thousands of copies.

In July 1963, Meader left Cadence Records and Booker/Doud to sign with MGM Records. Meader planned to record general satire and abandon his JFK impersonations.

=== Assassination aftermath ===
In November 1963, Meader was busy recording a new comedy record, written by a different group of writers and not involving his Kennedy impersonation. On November 22, 1963, President Kennedy was assassinated in Dallas, Texas, effectively ending Meader's career. Copies of The First Family were pulled from stores and a JFK-related Christmas single by Meader ("St. Nick Visits The White House" b/w "T'was The Night Before Christmas 1963") that had been released by MGM's Verve Records shortly before the assassination was quickly withdrawn. Appearances that were already booked were cancelled, including one for the Grammy Awards ceremony. An episode of The Joey Bishop Show, which Meader filmed one week before the assassination and was set to air in February 1964, was pulled from the lineup. The episode never aired and was reportedly destroyed.

Meader reportedly first learned of President Kennedy's assassination after hailing a taxicab in Milwaukee. The driver, recognizing his celebrity passenger, asked "Did you hear about Kennedy in Dallas?" Meader thought the driver was telling a joke and responded "No, how does it go?" The driver then informed Meader of President Kennedy's death. Meader then heard the breaking news bulletins over the taxi's radio.

According to several sources, stand-up comedian Lenny Bruce went on with his November 22 nightclub show as scheduled. Just hours after Kennedy's death, Bruce walked onstage, stood silently for several moments, then said, "Boy, is Vaughn Meader fucked." The joke proved true; Meader discovered that he was so completely typecast as a Kennedy impersonator that few were willing to hire him for any of his other talents. When he called them out, he was indirectly blacklisted in retaliation.

His non-Kennedy album for Verve Records, Have Some Nuts!!!, came out to minimal attention in early 1964. A similar follow-up, If The Shoe Fits... was released in late 1964, and included sketches on almost everything except the Kennedys, but sales were meager at best. Meader's income evaporated, new-found friends and associates stopped calling, and by 1965 Meader was virtually broke. Sinking into depression, he became addicted to alcohol and drugs, and was forced to take whatever work he could find.

He reunited with Earle Doud in 1971 for an album called The Second Coming, a comedic look at what life would be like for Jesus if he had returned to Earth around the time of Jesus Christ Superstar, but airplay and sales were virtually nonexistent.

== Later years ==
Meader tried several times to revive his career, but achieved only moderate success, and even then mostly outside of show business. He appeared briefly in the 1975 movie Linda Lovelace for President, portrayed Walter Winchell in the 1975 film Lepke starring Tony Curtis, and had a very brief cameo on the 1981 Rich Little comedy album The First Family Rides Again, which both parodied Ronald Reagan and paid homage to the original First Family album. Both the Kennedy and Reagan First Family albums were produced by Earle Doud.

Eventually, Meader resumed a career in bluegrass and country music, becoming a popular local performer in his native Maine. During the mid-1970s, he performed in Louisville, Kentucky, mostly at a small tavern known as the Storefront Congregation, under the name "Abbott Meader and the Honky-Tonk Angels." Meader sang and played piano.

== Personal life and death ==
Meader was married four times. He married his fourth wife, Sheila Colbath, in 1984. They remained married until his death.

Sheila was a caller on the NPR radio show Car Talk in 1992, where she mentioned that her husband was running for president. She questioned the hosts about a particular car, which she and Vaughn were considering taking on the campaign trail. Her call has been replayed as part of episode #2234 on the Car Talk podcast.

On October 29, 2004, Meader died of chronic obstructive pulmonary disease at the age of 68.

== Legacy ==
Meader has been posthumously credited for having broken new ground in the area of political humor, particularly in impersonations of the President of the United States.

In July 2006, nearly two years after Meader's death, the independent documentary First Impersonator premiered at the Maine International Film Festival in Waterville, Maine, Meader's birth town. The film chronicled Meader's life and death, his rise to fame and equally famous fall from it, and his influence on today's political impersonators.

== Discography ==
=== Albums ===
Year	Label	Title	US	UK
1962	Cadence Records	The First Family	1	12
	Cadence Records	The First Family Volume Two	4	X
1964	Verve Records	If The Shoe Fits...	X	X
1966	Laurie Records	Take That! You No Good...	X	X
1981	The Boardwalk Entertainment	The First Family Rides Again	X	X

=== EPs ===
Year	Label	Title	A-side tracks	B-side tracks
1962	Cadence Records	The First Family	A1: The Experiment A2: After Dinner Conversations A3: Relatively Speaking A4: Motorcade	B1: But Vote!! B2: Economy Lunch B3: Press Conference
1971	Kama Sutra Records	The Second Coming (Jesus Returns To Earth)	A1: God Sends Jesus Back To Earth A2: Jesus Arrives In Harlem A3: Jesus Meets Agent Joey Judas	B1: Jesus Encounters Women's Liberation B2: Win A Week With Jesus Contest (Jesus Meets The Reverend) B3: Jesus Visits The Salvation Army (On Christmas Eve)

=== Singles ===
Year	Label	A-side	B-side
1963	MGM Records	"The Elephant Song"	"No Hiding Place"
1963	Verve Records	"St. Nick Visits The White House"	"Twas the Night Before Christmas 1963"

== Filmography ==
Year	Title	Role	Notes
1975	Lepke	Walter Winchell	
1975	Linda Lovelace for President	Rev. Sacrifice	(final film role)
