= The First Family (album) =

Studio album by Vaughn Meader
- Released: November 1962; Spring 1963 (Volume Two)
- Recorded: October 22, 1962; March 18, 1963 (Volume Two)
- Studios: Fine Recording Studio, New York City
- Genre: Comedy
- Label: Cadence Records
- Producer: Earle Doud

Professional ratings
Review scores
Source	Rating
Allmusic	4.5/5 stars
New Record Mirror	5/5 stars

The First Family is a 1962 comedy album featuring comedian and impressionist Vaughn Meader. The album, written and produced by Bob Booker and Earle Doud, was recorded on October 22, 1962, is a good-natured parody of then-President John F. Kennedy, both as Commander-in-Chief and as a member of the prominent Kennedy family. Issued by Cadence Records, The First Family became the largest and fastest selling record in the history of the record industry, selling at more than one million copies per week for the first six and one-half weeks in distribution and remained at #1 on the Billboard 200 for 12 weeks. By January 1963, sales reached more than seven million copies. Cadence president Archie Bleyer credited the album's success to heavy radio airplay. The album was first played by Stan Z. Burns on WINS radio, a friend of Booker, and it instantly became a hit all over New York City. By the time the sequel album, The First Family Volume Two, was released, The First Family had sold 7 1/2 million copies – unprecedented for any album at the time, especially a comedy album.

The First Family won the Grammy Award for Album of the Year in 1963, becoming the second and most recent comedy or spoken word album to win the award.

== Cast ==
The First Family starred stand-up comedian and impersonator Vaughn Meader as Kennedy and Naomi Brossart as the First Lady. Meader's skill at impersonating Kennedy was honed on the stand-up circuit – with his New England accent naturally close to Kennedy's familiar, and often parodied, Harvard accent; he needed to adjust his voice only slightly to sound like the President. Brossart was a theatre actress and model making her recording début.

The First Family was written and produced by Bob Booker, Earle Doud and George Foster; Booker and Doud were also in the cast and received front cover billing, as the album is officially titled Bob Booker and Earle Doud Present The First Family. The album also features the voice talent of Jim Lehner, Bradley Bolke, Chuck McCann, Bob McFadden, and Norma MacMillan. It was recorded in front of a live studio audience.

Meader later revealed, "A lot of people don't know this, but we recorded The First Family on the night of October 22, 1962, the same night as John F. Kennedy's Cuban Missile Crisis speech. The audience was in the studio and had no idea of the drama that was taking place. But the cast had heard the speech and our throats almost dropped to our toes, because if the audience had heard the Cuban Missile Speech, we would not have received the reaction we did." During the Cuban Missile Crisis, Cadence Records almost cancelled the distribution of the record, assuming America would be going to war.

== In popular culture ==
Although the album was growing by 1962, production of a record imitating the President met stiff opposition. James Hagerty, a top executive for ABC News, ABC-Paramount Records and President D. Eisenhower’s former press secretary, said the proposed album would be "degrading to the presidency" and proclaimed that "every Communist country in the world would love this record." After other rejections, Cadence Records agreed to distribute the album, and within a month the record was appearing on store shelves, and seeing brisk sales. Two weeks later it had sold more than one million copies, pushing past the debut album by Peter, Paul and Mary.

Within weeks, many Americans could recite favorite lines from the record, including "the rubber schwan [swan] is mine", and "move ahead...with great vigah [vigor]", the latter lampooning the President's own words. The album poked fun at Kennedy's PT-109 history; the rocking chairs he used for his painful back; the Kennedy clan's well-known athleticism, football games and family togetherness; children in the White House; and Jackie Kennedy's soft-spoken nature and her redecoration of the White House; and many other bits of knowledge that the public was eager to consume. Kennedy himself was said to have given copies of the albums as Christmas gifts, and once greeted a Democratic National Committee group by saying, "Vaughn Meader was busy tonight, so I came myself." According to UPI reporter Merriman Smith, during a Cabinet meeting Kennedy played the entire record for everyone. At one press conference, Kennedy was asked if the album had produced "annoyment or enjoyment." He jokingly responded, "I listened to Mr. Meader's record and, frankly, I thought it sounded more like Teddy than it did me. So, now he's annoyed."

The First Family album won the Grammy Award for Album of the Year in 1963. That March, most of the same cast recorded a sequel album, The First Family Volume Two, a combination of spoken-word comedy and songs. Release in the spring of 1963, Volume Two was also successful, peaking at #4 on the album chart in June 1963.

Immediately after Kennedy's assassination on November 22, 1963, producers Booker and Doud, along with Cadence president Archie Bleyer, pulled both albums from sales and had all unsold copies destroyed so as not to seemingly "cash in" on the President's death. Both albums remained out of print until they were re-issued on CD together in 1999.

== Government response ==
The album was initially brought to the attention of the Kennedy administration in late November 1962, when special assistant to the President Arthur M. Schlesinger Jr. heard the ending to the track "Press Conference" being played on the radio while driving to the White House. The seemingly antisemitic attitude of Kennedy upon being asked about the possibility of a Jewish president frightened Schlesinger, who himself was Jewish, until it was revealed on-air that the segment was part of The First Family. He would send a memo to Kennedy on November 26, 1962, asking what the administration could do about mimicking the President on air: he would later clarify that his concerns related to a viewer missing the on-air disclosure or even it being omitted entirely. On November 27, during a dinner with Newsweek reporter Ben Bradlee, Kennedy brought up the record and Schlesinger's concerns while admitting that he enjoyed parts of the record; shortly afterward, he would play "[his] record" during a press conference.

It was only when Meader would start recording advertisements for radio stations while doing his Kennedy impression that the administration would formally respond to mimicry of the President's voice. While officials contemplated using the FCC to issue telegrams (as per an idea by Schlesinger), White House Press Secretary Pierre Salinger would have Cadence Records issue them instead on December 12. While many stations pulled the advertisements, Boston radio station WWDC (now known as WQOF) went further and banned the album from ever being played on the station again: Salinger would issue a follow-up memo to WWDC on December 17 clarifying that the album could be played, and the ban policy was revoked.

As months passed, the administration's patience with the album's success and its many imitations would gradually erode. In February 1963, Salinger demanded that Mars Broadcasting Inc. of Stamford, Connecticut, pull a series of commercials advertising a Pittsburgh car dealership that were inspired by The First Family off the air. The tension culminated in April 1963, when Salinger threatened to prosecute Meader through the FCC after he appeared on a late-night radio program hosted by Steve Allen on April 3, imitating Kennedy while calling an elderly woman from Kansas to ask about her opinions on healthcare for the elderly. Meader would limit his impressions to explicit comedy performances until Kennedy's assassination in November.

== Similar albums ==
In 1962, two similar albums were also released:

- The Other Family spoofed the Nikita Khrushchev regime of the Soviet Union and featured Buck Henry, Joan Rivers, and George Segal.
- The President Strikes Back! was an imagined response of President Kennedy to The First Family, written by future Mel Brooks collaborator Ron Clark.

During Lyndon Johnson's administration, Doud and Alen Robin released a series of two comedy albums using actual recordings of Johnson and other political figures to create comedic simulated interviews: Welcome to the LBJ Ranch (1965) and Lyndon Johnson's Lonely Hearts Club Band (1967).

In 1966, The New First Family 1968: A Futuristic Fairy Tale was issued, co-produced by Bob Booker and George Foster, and starring impressionist and comic Will Jordan as the newly elected president Cary Grant in this political fantasy. Two other noted impressionists also appeared on the album – John Byner and David Frye. Frye's impression of Richard Nixon would later be featured on the Elektra Records albums I Am the President and Radio Free Nixon, among others. Will Jordan's most famous impression – that of TV host and newspaper columnist Ed Sullivan – was not used on The New First Family 1968. Instead, the Ed Sullivan impression heard on the album was done by Byner.

In 1981, a new album titled The First Family Rides Again was issued, co-produced by Doud and starring impressionist Rich Little as then-President Ronald Reagan.

== Track listing ==
=== The First Family ===
==== Act I ====
- "The Experiment"
- "After Dinner Conversations"
- "The Malayan Ambassador"
- "Relatively Speaking"
- "Astronauts"
- "Motorcade"
- "The Party"
- "The Tour"

==== Act II ====
- "But Vote!!"
- "Economy Lunch"
- "The Decision"
- "White House Visitor"
- "Press Conference"
- "The Dress"
- "Saturday Night, Sunday Morning"
- "Auld Lang Syne"
- "Bedtime Story"

=== The First Family Volume Two ===
==== Act I ====
- "The Announcement"
- "An Evening with JFK"
- "1958"
- "The Trial"
- "The Law"
- "The Crisis"
- "The Concert"
- "The First Daughter"
- "Biography"

==== Act II ====
- "The First Family March"
- "Taxes"
- "The Movie"
- "Caroline's First Date"
- "Stop the World"
- "The Brothers Three"
- "1996"
- "Equal Time"

== Chart positions ==
Chart (1962)	Peak position
The First Family: Billboard Top LPs—Monaural	1
The First Family Volume Two: Billboard Top LPs—Monaural	4

== See also ==
- Cultural depictions of John F. Kennedy
- Lists of fastest-selling albums
