= Oblivion, POV & Some Trivia =

Compilation album by Utopia
- Released: 9 April 1996
- Genre: Progressive rock Art rock
- Length: 96:29
- Label: Rhino
- Producer: Todd Rundgren, Gary Peterson

Utopia chronology
Passport Collection (1996)	Oblivion, POV & Some Trivia (1996)	City in My Head (1999)

Professional ratings
Review scores
Source	Rating
Allmusic	2.5/5 stars

Oblivion, POV & Some Trivia is a Rhino Records compilation album by Utopia. It includes all of the tracks from the original Utopia albums Oblivion and P.O.V., and the song "Man of Action," which was originally the b-side to the U.K. single "Mated" and a bonus track on the cassette and CD versions of P.O.V.. It also includes the non-regular-album tracks, "Fix Your Gaze" and "Monument" from the compilation album Trivia.

== Track listing ==
All songs written by Utopia (Roger Powell, Todd Rundgren, Kasim Sulton, and Willie Wilcox).

Disc 1: Oblivion
No.	Title	Lead vocals	Length
1.	"Itch in My Brain"	Todd Rundgren	4:30
2.	"Love with a Thinker"	Kasim Sulton	3:15
3.	"Bring Me My Longbow"	Rundgren	3:18
4.	"If I Didn't Try"	Rundgren	4:10
5.	"Too Much Water"	Sulton, Rundgren	4:47
6.	"Maybe I Could Change"	Sulton	4:08
7.	"Crybaby"	Rundgren	4:19
8.	"Welcome to My Revolution"	Rundgren	5:01
9.	"Winston Smith Takes It on the Jaw"	Sulton	3:17
10.	"I Will Wait"	Sulton	4:43
11.	"Fix Your Gaze" (from Trivia)	Rundgren	4:32

Disc 2: POV
No.	Title	Lead vocals	Length
1.	"Play This Game"	Rundgren	4:12
2.	"Style"	Sulton	4:14
3.	"Stand for Something"	Rundgren	3:50
4.	"Secret Society"	Rundgren	4:17
5.	"Zen Machine"	Powell	4:07
6.	"Mated"	Rundgren	3:56
7.	"Wildlife"	Willie Wilcox, Rundgren	3:36
8.	"Mimi Gets Mad"	Sulton	3:44
9.	"Mystified"	Rundgren	5:21
10.	"More Light"	Sulton	3:54
11.	"Man of Action" (B-side of "Mated")	Rundgren, Sulton	3:42
12.	"Monument" (from Trivia)	Sulton	5:39

== Personnel ==
- Roger Powell – keyboards, vocals
- Todd Rundgren – guitar, vocals
- Kasim Sulton – bass, vocals
- John "Willie" Wilcox – drums, vocals

=== Credits ===
- Brett Bayne – project assistant
- Murray Brenman – artwork
- Lynn Goldsmith – photography
- Bill Inglot – remastering
- Brett Milano – liner notes
- Ken Owen – project assistant
- Gary Peterson – reissue producer
- Coco Shinomiya – art direction
- John Wagman – design
