= Trivia (album) =

Compilation album by Utopia
- Released: June 6, 1986
- Recorded: 1982–1985
- Studio: Utopia Sound Studios (Lake Hill)
- Genres: New wave; power pop
- Length: 49:12
- Label: Passport Records
- Producers: Todd Rundgren; Utopia

Utopia chronology
POV (1985)	Trivia (1986)	Redux '92 (1993)

Professional ratings
Review scores
Source	Rating
Allmusic	3/5 stars

Trivia is a compilation album by the rock group Utopia, released on June 6, 1986. It consists of tracks from their albums Utopia, Oblivion and POV, as well as two new tracks, "Fix Your Gaze" and "Monument". This was their first release on compact disc.

== Track listing ==
All tracks are written by Todd Rundgren, Roger Powell, Kasim Sulton, and Willie Wilcox except where noted.

No.	Title	Writer(s)	Length
1.	"Fix Your Gaze"		4:31
2.	"Hammer in My Heart"		4:10
3.	"Feet Don't Fail Me Now"	Rundgren; Powell; Wilcox; Doug Howard	3:06
4.	"Bad Little Actress"		2:50
5.	"Princess of the Universe"		3:29
6.	"Too Much Water"		4:40
7.	"Crybaby"		4:20
8.	"If I Didn't Try"		4:10
9.	"Style"		4:11
10.	"Mated"		3:55
11.	"Play This Game"		4:11
12.	"Monument"		5:39
Total length:			49:12

== Personnel ==
=== Utopia ===
- Todd Rundgren – vocals, guitar
- Kasim Sulton – vocals, bass guitar
- Roger Powell – vocals, keyboards
- John "Willie" Wilcox – vocals, drums

=== Technical ===
- Produced by Todd Rundgren and Utopia
- Mastered by Greg Calbi at Sterling Sound (New York City, NY)
- Photography – Lynn Goldsmith
- Layout – Murray Brenman
- Management – Eric Gardner
