= Another Live =

Live album by Todd Rundgren's Utopia
- Released: October 1975
- Recorded: August 23 and 25, 1975
- Venues: Cape Cod Coliseum (South Yarmouth); Wollman Rink (New York)
- Genres: Art rock; progressive rock
- Length: 45:56
- Labels: Bearsville; Rhino
- Producer: Todd Rundgren

Todd Rundgren's Utopia chronology
Todd Rundgren's Utopia (1974)	Another Live (1975)	Ra (1977)

Alternative Cover
- UK Release Cover

Professional ratings
Review scores
Source	Rating
AllMusic	2.5/5 stars
Rolling Stone	(Not Rated)

Another Live is a live album by American rock band Utopia, released in October 1975 by Bearsville Records.

The record was the band's first fully live album, the first Utopia album to include future mainstays Roger Powell and Willie Wilcox, and the last to feature Ralph Schuckett and Moogy Klingman. The trio of backing singers Arnold McCuller, David Lasley and Phillip Ballou were also new to the group and toured the summer tour, being replaced that September with future star Luther Vandross and Anthony Hinton, who had toured the UK with Utopia later that year.

Side one contains three new songs that had not been previously issued, and which were either never recorded or not released as studio versions. (Live 1975 versions of Powell's "Mister Triscuits" and Rundgren's "The Wheel" can also be heard on the album Todd Rundgren's Utopia Live at Hammersmith Odeon '75). (Shout Music, 2012).

Side two is a mix of live cover versions of songs by band members and other artists. Jeff Lynne's "Do Ya" was a B-side to The Move's "California Man" single (1972) which had a double-track B-side also featuring the song "Ella James".

As well as referring to the fact the album was recorded live, the title is an obvious paraphrase of the phrase "Another Life", referencing the Eastern philosophical concept of reincarnation, as alluded to in the first track on Side One. The printed title of Powell's instrumental "Mister Triscuits" was reportedly the result of Powell's publisher mistranscribing its original full title, "The Emerald Tablet of Hermes Trismegistus".

With no singles released to push it higher, the album peaked at No. 66 on the Billboard 200 charts.

== Track listing ==
Side one
No.	Title	Writer(s)	Recording date and location	Length
1.	"Another Life"	Todd Rundgren; Ralph Schuckett	August 23, 1975 at Cape Cod Coliseum	7:37
2.	"The Wheel"	Rundgren	August 25, 1975 at Wollman Rink	7:04
3.	"The Seven Rays"	Rundgren; John Siegler	August 23, 1975 at Cape Cod Coliseum	8:52

Side two
No.	Title	Writer(s)	Recording date and location	Length
4.	"Intro/Mister Triscuits"	Roger Powell	August 25, 1975 at Wollman Rink	5:27
5.	"Something's Coming"	Leonard Bernstein; Stephen Sondheim	August 25, 1975 at Wollman Rink	2:51
6.	"Heavy Metal Kids"	Rundgren	August 25, 1975 at Wollman Rink	4:16
7.	"Do Ya"	Jeff Lynne	August 25, 1975 at Wollman Rink	4:12
8.	"Just One Victory"	Rundgren	August 25, 1975 at Wollman Rink	5:37

== Personnel ==
=== Utopia ===
- Todd Rundgren – guitar, lead vocals
- John Siegler – bass, backing vocals
- Roger Powell – Moog synthesizer, trumpet (1, 2), synthesizer solo (3), backing vocals
- Ralph Schuckett – keyboards, synthesizers, organ solo (1), Clavinet solo (4), accordion (2), backing vocals
- Mark "Moogy" Klingman – keyboards, synthesizers, harmonica (2), glockenspiel (2), Korg solo (4), backing vocals
- John Wilcox – drums, congas (2)

==== Additional musicians ====
- David Lasley – backing vocals
- Arnold McCuller – backing vocals
- Phillip Ballou – backing vocals

=== Technical ===
- Produced by Todd Rundgren
- Engineered by Aaron Baron and Larry Dahlstrom
- Assistant engineer – Paul Cohen
- Lighting designer and technical director – Mark Kruger
- Stage manager – Victor Doria
- Electrician – Barry Coher
- Equipment – Jeff Gilreath and Glenn Orsher
- Sound mixer – Mark Styles
- Tour design – Jay Jacobs

== Charts ==
Album - Billboard

Year	Chart	Position
1975	Pop Albums	66
