= Utopia (Utopia album) =

Studio album by Utopia
- Released: 1982
- Recorded: August 1982
- Studio: Utopia Sound Studios (Lake Hill)
- Genres: Power pop; new wave
- Length: 47:04
- Labels: Network; Epic
- Producers: Todd Rundgren; Utopia

Utopia chronology
Swing to the Right (1982)	Utopia (1982)	Oblivion (1984)

Singles from Utopia
- 1. "Feet Don't Fail Me Now" Released: December 1982; 2. "Hammer In My Heart" Released: May 1983; 3. "Hammer In My Heart (12"Dance Mix)" Released: May 1983

Professional ratings
Review scores
Source	Rating
AllMusic	3/5 stars
The Rolling Stone Album Guide	2.5/5 stars

Utopia is the second of two self-titled albums by the rock group Utopia (the other being Todd Rundgren's Utopia). It was released in 1982 (see 1982 in music). It was also their only album for Network Records.

During the composing phase of this album, Kasim Sulton had left to pursue a solo career, and Doug Howard from the band Touch was brought in on bass. Howard co-wrote two songs on the album, "Feet Don’t Fail Me Now" and "I’m Looking at You But I’m Talking to Myself". These songs are credited to "Utopia and Doug Howard" on the finished album. Howard stepped aside when Sulton decided to return, had no further involvement with the group, and was not featured in the album's cover photo.

Videos and singles were released for "Feet Don't Fail Me Now" and "Hammer in My Heart". Footage for "Hammer in My Heart" was recorded live on August 18, 1982, at MTV's official first-birthday celebration hosted by VeeJay Nina Blackwood. The song peaked at #31 on Billboard's Mainstream Rock chart. Both were featured on the VHS video release "The Utopia Sampler" nominated in 1983 for a Grammy for Best Short Form Video.

The original vinyl LP was released as a three-sided set of two 12" discs - the third side including five additional songs, repeated on both sides of the second disc. It was then released as a single LP with the five additional songs on the included two-sided EP, then as a single LP with an included five-song 45. The later CD releases simply include the five side three tracks on the same disc as the rest of the album. In Europe, the EP was pressed as a 7" with the five songs split between the two sides; elsewhere, the EP was pressed as a 12" with all five songs repeated on both sides of the EP.

== Track listing ==
All tracks are written by Todd Rundgren, Roger Powell, Kasim Sulton, and Willie Wilcox except where noted.

Side one
No.	Title	Writer(s)	Lead vocal(s)	Length
1.	"Libertine"	Rundgren; Powell; Wilcox	Sulton	2:47
2.	"Bad Little Actress"	Rundgren; Powell; Wilcox	Rundgren; Sulton	2:50
3.	"Feet Don’t Fail Me Now"	Rundgren; Powell; Wilcox; Doug Howard	Powell (verses); Group (choruses)	3:06
4.	"Neck On Up"		Wilcox	2:53
5.	"Say Yeah"		Rundgren; Sulton	3:04

Side two
No.	Title	Writer(s)	Lead vocal(s)	Length
6.	"Call It What You Will"		Sulton	3:48
7.	"I’m Looking at You But I’m Talking to Myself"	Rundgren; Powell; Wilcox; Howard	Rundgren	3:38
8.	"Hammer in My Heart"		Rundgren	4:10
9.	"Burn Three Times"		Powell	3:15
10.	"There Goes My Inspiration"		Rundgren; Sulton	3:24

Side three (Bonus LP)
No.	Title	Writer(s)	Lead vocal(s)	Length
11.	"Princess of the Universe"	Rundgren; Powell; Wilcox	Wilcox	3:29
12.	"Infrared and Ultraviolet"	Rundgren; Powell; Wilcox	Rundgren; Sulton	2:17
13.	"Forgotten But Not Gone"		Rundgren; Sulton	2:31
14.	"Private Heaven"		Sulton	3:12
15.	"Chapter and Verse"		Rundgren	3:40
Total length:				47:04

=== CD reissue ===
No.	Title	Writer(s)	Lead vocal(s)	Length
1.	"Libertine"	Rundgren; Powell; Wilcox	Sulton	2:47
2.	"Bad Little Actress"	Rundgren; Powell; Wilcox	Rundgren; Sulton	2:50
3.	"Feet Don’t Fail Me Now"	Rundgren; Powell; Wilcox; Howard	Powell (verses); Group (choruses)	3:06
4.	"Neck On Up"		Wilcox	2:53
5.	"Say Yeah"		Rundgren; Sulton	3:04
6.	"Call It What You Will"		Sulton	3:48
7.	"I’m Looking at You But I’m Talking to Myself"	Rundgren; Powell; Wilcox; Howard	Rundgren	3:38
8.	"Hammer in My Heart"		Rundgren	4:10
9.	"Burn Three Times"		Powell	3:15
10.	"There Goes My Inspiration"		Rundgren; Sulton	3:24
11.	"Princess of the Universe"	Rundgren; Powell; Wilcox	Wilcox	3:29
12.	"Infrared and Ultraviolet"	Rundgren; Powell; Wilcox	Rundgren; Sulton	2:17
13.	"Forgotten But Not Gone"		Rundgren; Sulton	2:31
14.	"Private Heaven"		Sulton	3:12
15.	"Chapter and Verse"		Rundgren	3:40
16.	"Hammer in My Heart (Dance Mix)" (Only available on 2000 CD reissue by Unidisc Music)		Rundgren	5:11
Total length:				52:15

== Personnel ==
=== Utopia ===
- Todd Rundgren – guitar, vocals
- Roger Powell – keyboards, vocals
- Kasim Sulton – bass, vocals
- John "Willie" Wilcox – drums, percussion, vocals
- Doug Howard – bass, vocals

=== Technical ===
- Produced by Todd Rundgren and Utopia
- Engineered by Todd Rundgren and Chris Andersen
- Mastered by Greg Calbi at Sterling Sound (New York City, NY)
- Album design – The Creative Directors, Inc.
- Art directors – Len Zabala and John Wagman
- Photography – Bill Hayward
- Stylist – Yonah Schurink
- Management – Eric Gardner
- Digital remastering (CD reissue) – Bill Inglot

== Charts ==
Chart (1983)	Peak position
US Top LPs & Tape (Billboard)	84
