= Deface the Music =

Studio album by Utopia
- Released: September 24, 1980
- Recorded: 1980
- Studio: Utopia Sound Studios (Lake Hill)
- Genres: Pop rock; power pop
- Length: 32:06
- Label: Bearsville
- Producers: Todd Rundgren; Utopia

Utopia chronology
Adventures in Utopia (1979)	Deface the Music (1980)	Swing to the Right (1982)

Singles from Deface The Music
- 1. "I Just Want To Touch You" Released: November 1980; 2. "Alone" Released: 1981 (Spain only)

Professional ratings
Review scores
Source	Rating
AllMusic	4/5 stars
Billboard	(positive)
Rolling Stone	3/5 stars

Deface the Music is the fifth studio album by American rock band Utopia, released on September 24, 1980 by Bearsville Records. The concept of the album was to pay homage to the Beatles and create songs which sounded very similar to the Fab Four's tunes throughout the various stages of their career. Their song "Take It Home", replete with guitar riff, is their homage to "Day Tripper". The first track, "I Just Want to Touch You", was recorded by Utopia for the Roadie soundtrack. It was rejected by the movie's producers for fear of legal action because it sounded so much like the Beatles. In addition to the cover art being a direct homage to With the Beatles, the original pressing was made to look like an early 1960s release, with custom inner sleeve advertising their previous three albums, even down to the way the vinyl was mastered with wide bands of silence between each song.

== Track listing ==
All tracks are written by Todd Rundgren, Roger Powell, Kasim Sulton, and Willie Wilcox.

Side one
No.	Title	Lead vocals	Length
1.	"I Just Want to Touch You"	Sulton	2:00
2.	"Crystal Ball"	Rundgren	2:00
3.	"Where Does the World Go to Hide"	Sulton	1:41
4.	"Silly Boy"	Powell	2:20
5.	"Alone"	Sulton	2:20
6.	"That's Not Right"	Rundgren; Sulton	2:37
7.	"Take It Home"	Rundgren	2:53

Side two
No.	Title	Lead vocals	Length
8.	"Hoi Poloi"	Sulton	2:33
9.	"Life Goes On"	Sulton; Wilcox	2:21
10.	"Feel Too Good"	Sulton	3:04
11.	"Always Late"	Wilcox	2:22
12.	"All Smiles"	Sulton	2:27
13.	"Everybody Else Is Wrong"	Rundgren	3:38
Total length:			32:06

== Personnel ==
=== Utopia ===
- Todd Rundgren – guitar, vocals
- Roger Powell – keyboards, harmonica, vocals
- Kasim Sulton – bass, vocals
- Willie Wilcox – drums, vocals

=== Technical ===
- Produced by Todd Rundgren and Utopia
- Engineered and mixed by Todd Rundgren
- Assistant engineer – Chris Andersen
- Album design and production – The Creative Directors, Inc.
- Art director – John Wagman
- Cover illustration – Jane Millett
- Photography – Kenneth Siegel
- Management – Eric Gardner

== Charts ==
Chart (1981)	Position
US Billboard Year-End	65

== See also ==
- The Rutles
