= POV (album) =

Studio album by Utopia
- Released: January 1985
- Recorded: 1984
- Studio: Utopia Sound Studios (Lake Hill)
- Genres: Rock; new wave
- Length: 41:11
- Label: Passport
- Producers: Todd Rundgren; Willie Wilcox

Utopia chronology
Oblivion (1984)	POV (1985)	Trivia (1986)

Singles from POV
- 1. "Mated" Released: June 1985

Professional ratings
Review scores
Source	Rating
Allmusic	2/5 stars

POV is the ninth and final studio album by the rock group Utopia, released in January 1985 by Passport Records. It peaked at No. 161 on the Billboard 200 charts. Except for a live 1992 reunion album (and compilations), this was the last album released by Utopia, and Rundgren's final studio work under the Utopia banner.

The ambiguous acronymic title is given four possible explanations on the back cover of the album, standing variously for "Price of Victory", "Pillar of Virtue", "Point of View" or "Persistence of Vision". The front cover photo depicts the band dressed in quasi-military costumes and looking at a star map, while in the background the giant "Pharaoh" mask (a stage prop from their 1977-1978 Ra tour) can be seen. The album layout also reflects Rundgren's interest in computers and information technology and incorporates elements adapted from the 'window' design used in the Apple Macintosh operating system of the mid-1980s. The music continues in the contemporary pop vein of the previous album, with elements of new wave music and electronic experimental music as well.

== Track listing ==
All tracks are written by Todd Rundgren, Roger Powell, Kasim Sulton, and Willie Wilcox.

Side one
No.	Title	Lead vocals	Length
1.	"Play This Game"	Rundgren	4:12
2.	"Style"	Sulton	4:14
3.	"Stand for Something"	Rundgren	3:50
4.	"Secret Society"	Rundgren	4:17
5.	"Zen Machine"	Powell	4:07

Side two
No.	Title	Lead vocals	Length
6.	"Mated"	Rundgren	3:56
7.	"Wildlife"	Wilcox; Rundgren	3:36
8.	"Mimi Gets Mad"	Sulton	3:44
9.	"Mystified"	Rundgren	5:21
10.	"More Light"	Sulton	3:54
Total length:			41:11

Bonus tracks
No.	Title	Lead vocals	Length
11.	"Man of Action" (B-side of single; bonus track on cassette and CD versions)	Rundgren; Sulton	3:42
12.	"Fix Your Gaze" (Originally from Trivia, 1986)	Rundgren	4:32
13.	"Monument" (Originally from Trivia, 1986)	Sulton	5:39
Total length:			55:04

== Personnel ==
=== Utopia ===
- Todd Rundgren – vocals, guitar, Fairlight CMI
- Kasim Sulton – vocals, bass guitar
- Roger Powell – vocals, keyboards, Fairlight CMI
- John "Willie" Wilcox – vocals, drums

=== Technical ===
- Produced by Todd Rundgren and Willie Wilcox
- Co-produced by Kasim Sulton and Roger Powell
- Mixed by Todd Rundgren
- Mastered by Greg Calbi at Sterling Sound (New York City, NY)
- Photography – Lynn Goldsmith
- Package concept – Utopia
- Layout – Murray Brenman
- Management – Eric Gardner
- Assistants – Chris Andersen and Mary Lou Arnold

==== 2011 Reissue ====
- Remastered by Ben Wiseman
- Project coordination – Mark Powell and Vicky Powell
- Liner notes – Mark Powell
- CD package design – Phil Smee
- Additional photography – Mark Weiss

== Charts ==
Album – Billboard

Year	Chart	Position
1985	Pop Albums	161
