= Disco Jets =

Album by Utopia

Studio album by Utopia
- Released: 2001
- Recorded: 1976
- Genre: Progressive rock, art rock, disco
- Length: 33:53
- Label: Esoteric
- Producer: Todd Rundgren

Utopia chronology
City in My Head (1999)	Disco Jets (2001)	Live at Hammersmith Odeon '75 (2012)

Disco Jets is a tongue-in-cheek project organized and recorded by Todd Rundgren and Utopia shortly after recording Rundgren's Faithful LP and including the same musicians as those sessions. It's an instrumental recording humorously parodying 1976's US Bicentennial celebrations, disco music, science fiction films and the CB radio fads. It was released in 2001, 25 years after its recording, as part of the Todd Archive Series Vol. 4 – "Todd Rundgren Demos and Lost Albums" (Rhino CRCL-7707/08) 2-CD set on Rhino Entertainment/Crown Japan. It was reissued in 2012 as a standalone CD import on Esoteric Recordings and in 2015 on Cherry Red. It was also released as a limited edition vinyl that was manufactured exclusively by Cherry Red for Record Store Day, only appearing in record shops from Saturday 16 April.

The album was the last Utopia project with bassist John Siegler, replaced shortly after by Kasim Sulton. Greg Prato commented on Allmusic that "the album seems to be a bridge of sorts between Utopia's earlier prog rock direction and their forthcoming more 'streamlined' direction."

== Track listing ==
All songs written by Todd Rundgren, Roger Powell, John Siegler and Willie Wilcox, except where noted.

1. "Disco Jets" – 3:33
2. "Cosmic Convoy" – 3:13
3. "Time Warp" (Rick Derringer) – 2:30
4. "V.H.F" – 3:47
5. "Star Trek" (Alexander Courage) – 4:07
6. "Pet Rock" – 3:23
7. "Space War" – 3:25
8. "Rising Sign" – 3:48
9. "Black Hole" – 3:19
10. "Spirit Of '76" – 2:48

== Personnel ==
- Todd Rundgren – guitar, vocals, production
- Roger Powell – trumpet, keyboards, production
- John Siegler – bass, cello, production
- John "Willie" Wilcox – drums, production
