= Todd Rundgren's Utopia (album) =

Studio album by Todd Rundgren's Utopia
- Released: October 4, 1974
- Venue: Fox Theatre (Atlanta) ("Utopia")
- Studio: Secret Sound (New York)
- Genres: Progressive rock; art rock
- Length: 59:18
- Label: Bearsville
- Producer: Todd Rundgren

Todd Rundgren's Utopia chronology
Todd Rundgren's Utopia (1974)	Another Live (1975)

Professional ratings
Review scores
Source	Rating
Allmusic	2/5 stars
Rolling Stone	(Not rated)
Tom Hull	C+

Todd Rundgren's Utopia is the debut album by American rock band Utopia, released on October 4, 1974 by Bearsville Records. The band was formed in 1973 by musician, songwriter, and producer Todd Rundgren who decided to expand his musical style by moving from pop-oriented rock towards progressive rock. He assembled a six-piece group that featured three keyboardists and toured as a live act. Most of the album was recorded in the studio except "Utopia", the opening track, which was recorded live in concert April 25, 1974.

The album peaked at number 34 on the Billboard 200 and critical reaction towards it was mixed.

== Background ==
Like Rundgren's solo albums A Wizard, a True Star (1973) and Initiation (1975), the album pushed the limits of vinyl. At almost an hour in length, the sound needed to be compressed in order to fit it onto one record, resulting in a decline in audio quality. The CD version avoids this issue. On the first reissue of the album, released in 1978, the title of "Utopia" was changed to "Utopia Theme" and publishing credits were changed from Earmark Music to Earmark Music and Screen Gems - Columbia Music. "Utopia" was recorded live in concert at the Fox Theatre in Atlanta, Georgia on April 25, 1974.

== Track listing ==
Note: "Utopia" is titled "Utopia Theme" on later editions.

Side one
No.	Title	Writer(s)	Length
1.	"Utopia" (recorded live at the Fox Theater, Atlanta, Georgia)	Todd Rundgren; David Mason	14:18
2.	"Freak Parade"	Rundgren; John Siegler; Mark "Moogy" Klingman	10:14
3.	"Freedom Fighters"	Rundgren	4:01

Side two
No.	Title	Writer(s)	Length
1.	"The Ikon"	Rundgren; Siegler; Klingman; Ralph Schuckett	30:22
Total length:			58:55

== Personnel ==
=== Utopia ===
- Todd Rundgren – guitar, vocals
- Mark "Moogy" Klingman – keyboards, organ
- Ralph Schuckett – keyboards
- M. Frog Labat – synthesizers
- John Siegler – bass, cello
- Kevin Ellman – drums, percussion

=== Technical ===
- Produced and engineered by Todd Rundgren
- Assistant engineer – David Le Sage
- Design and illustration – Maruo Miyauchi
- Arranged by Utopia
