= Swing to the Right =

Studio album by Utopia
- Released: March 1, 1982
- Recorded: 1981
- Studio: Utopia Sound Studios (Lake Hill)
- Genres: Pop rock; new wave; power pop
- Length: 38:55
- Label: Bearsville
- Producers: Todd Rundgren; Utopia

Utopia chronology
Deface the Music (1980)	Swing to the Right (1982)	Utopia (1982)

Singles from Swing To The Right
- 1. "One World" Released: April 1982; 2. "Lysistrata" Released: June 1982

Professional ratings
Review scores
Source	Rating
Allmusic	3.5/5 stars

Swing to the Right is the sixth studio album by American rock band Utopia, released on March 1, 1982 by Bearsville Records. It followed the Beatles parody-homage Deface the Music. Swing to the Right moves into hard-edged commentary on corporate raiders, warmongers, political villains, and despicable music industry moguls. There is little in the way of progressive rock on this album, which is limited to its title track.

Recorded in early 1981 and set for release that June, Bearsville was reluctant to release the album because of its political and religious themes. In protest Utopia took this material on the road for a full year begging audiences to petition Bearsville executives to release it, even going as far as giving out the phone number and address of Bearsville and instructing audiences to ask for Albert Grossman.

The album cover is a retouched and tinted reproduction of a well-known photograph taken at a public burning of Beatles records, which took place in August 1966 in the town of Waycross, Georgia, in response to John Lennon's controversial "more popular than Jesus" remark. The photograph, distributed by UPI and printed on front pages of newspapers including The Savannah Morning News, depicts the burning of the Beatles albums in Waycross in a large bonfire, while in the foreground a boy holds an LP which is about to be thrown into the fire. In the original image, the album the boy holds is a copy of the Beatles' Capitol Records debut LP Meet the Beatles!, but on the Utopia cover this has been photographically replaced with an image of the Swing to the Right cover (thereby creating the illusion of an endless regression of the same image). The August 1966 event was promoted by WAYX radio in Waycross and was one of dozens that took place across the country in August 1966 in response to Lennon's remarks.

== Background and recording ==
One song entitled "God and Me" was left off the album.

The track "One World" was originally intended for release on Deface the Music. A demo version from that album's sessions exists, and it was played live on that album's tour with slightly different lyrics.

== Track listing ==
All tracks are written by Todd Rundgren, Roger Powell, Kasim Sulton, and Willie Wilcox except where noted.

Side one
No.	Title	Lead vocals	Length
1.	"Swing to the Right"	Sulton	4:21
2.	"Lysistrata"	Rundgren	2:43
3.	"The Up"	Sulton	4:08
4.	"Junk Rock (Million Monkeys)"	Wilcox	3:13
5.	"Shinola"	Rundgren	5:21

Side two
No.	Title	Lead vocals	Length
6.	"For the Love of Money" (Kenneth Gamble, Leon Huff, Anthony Jackson)	Sulton; Rundgren	3:40
7.	"Last Dollar on Earth"	Powell	4:13
8.	"Fahrenheit 451"	Sulton; Rundgren	2:47
9.	"Only Human"	Rundgren	5:11
10.	"One World"	Rundgren	3:24

== Personnel ==
=== Utopia ===
- Todd Rundgren – guitar, vocals
- Roger Powell – keyboards, trumpet, vocals
- Kasim Sulton – bass, vocals
- Willie Wilcox – drums, vocals

=== Technical ===
- Produced by Todd Rundgren and Utopia
- Engineered by Todd Rundgren and Chris Andersen
- Mastered by Ted Jensen at Sterling Sound (New York City, NY)
- Album design and production – The Creative Directors, Inc.
- Cover – Walt Behnke
- Art direction – John Wagman
- Design – Lisa Amowitz
- Tinting – Geoffrey Thomas
- Photo credits – UPI, The Bettmann Archive
- Management – Eric Gardner

== Charts ==
Album – Billboard

Year	Chart	Position
1982	Pop Albums	102
