= Initiation (Todd Rundgren album) =

Studio album by Todd Rundgren
- Released: May 23, 1975
- Studios: Secret Sound (New York); Mediasound (New York); Bearsville (Woodstock)
- Genre: Progressive rock
- Length: 68:11
- Label: Bearsville
- Producer: Todd Rundgren

Todd Rundgren chronology
Todd (1974)	Initiation (1975)	Faithful (1976)

Singles from Initiation
- 1. "Real Man" Released: April 1975

Professional ratings
Review scores
Source	Rating
AllMusic	2/5 stars
Rolling Stone	(Not rated)

Initiation is the sixth studio album by American musician Todd Rundgren, released on May 23, 1975 by Bearsville Records. With this album, Rundgren fully embraced the synthesized progressive rock sound he had begun exploring in more depth in his work with his band Utopia. However, unlike Utopia, in which Rundgren had limited himself to playing guitar, much of the synthesizers on Initiation were played and programmed by Rundgren himself.

== Content ==
At over sixty-seven minutes, Initiation is one of the longest commercially-released albums contained to a single LP disc. Due to a plastic shortage, in order to keep the album on one vinyl LP, Rundgren had to limit and EQ the master so the bass response was rolled off to keep the grooves small enough to cut onto a single disc; he also had to speed up the first half of Side One ("Real Man" to "Eastern Intrigue") and speed up the entirety of Side Two to eliminate 2–3 minutes from each side (5). The album's original inner sleeve included a note which stated: "Technical note: Due to the amount of music on this disc (over one hour), two points must be emphasized. Firstly, if your needle is worn or damaged, it will ruin the disc immediately. Secondly, if the sound does seem not loud enough on your system, try re-recording the music onto tape. By the way, thanks for buying the album."

The titles and concept are taken directly from Alice A. Bailey's book A Treatise on Cosmic Fire.

== Critical reception ==
In The Illustrated New Musical Express Encyclopedia of Rock, Nick Logan and Bob Woffinden wrote, "Initiation (1975), despite the pretentious flirtations with half-baked versions of Zen Buddhism and Alice A. Bailey's "A Treatise On Cosmic Fire" that influenced his lyrics and Eastern mystic scores, contained a perceptible undercurrent of his former melodic invention while one could ascertain traces of self-parody and wry humorous debunking of what Rundgren appeared on the other hand to be holding up as valid. At a shade over one hour Initiation is also amongst the longest albums ever made, evidence of his engineering abilities, if not his sense of self-control".

== Influence ==
When asked if Rundgren had influenced his music, with perceived influences of Initiation on Queen Elizabeth and Rite², Julian Cope responded that he and Thighpaulsandra loved "A Treatise on Cosmic Fire", "but we both bemoaned the fact that it was recorded so long before ambient music had been defined that Todd treated it as an ever-evolving, almost prog-rock piece. We both loved huge elements of that piece but found that we never listened to it. So we tried to build that Todd-like transcendence into our own piece of music [with Queen Elizabeth]."

== Track listing ==
All tracks are written by Todd Rundgren.

Side one
No.	Title	Length
1.	"Real Man"	4:25
2.	"Born to Synthesize"	3:40
3.	"The Death of Rock and Roll"	3:48
4.	"Eastern Intrigue"	5:06
5.	"Initiation"	7:05
6.	"Fair Warning"	8:07

Side two
No.	Title	Length
7.	"A Treatise on Cosmic Fire": "Intro - Prana" – 4:27; "II. The Fire of Mind - or: Solar Fire" – 3:43; "III. The Fire of Spirit - or: Electric Fire" – 7:34; "I. The Internal Fire - or: Fire by Friction" – 19:36; 1. "Mûlâdhâra: The Dance of Kundalini"; 2. "Svâdhishthâna: Bam, Bham, Mam, Yam, Ram, Lam, Thank You, Mahm"; 3. "Manipûra: Seat of Fire"; 4. "Anâhata: The Halls of Air"; 5. "Vishudda: Sounds Beyond Ears"; 6. "Ajnâ: Sights Beyond Eyes"; 7. "Brahmarandhra: Nirvana Shakri"; "Outro - Prana"	35:20

== Personnel ==
=== Musicians ===
- Todd Rundgren – vocals, guitars (1, 3), lead guitar (5), piano (1, 6), electric piano (4), electric sitar (4, 6), Clavinet (5), synthesizers (1, 5, 6), RMI Keyboard Computer (1, 4–6), ARP String Ensemble (1, 4–6), percussion (1, 4), all instruments (7), arrangements
- Moogy Klingman – RMI Keyboard Computer (1), organ (6)
- Ralph Schuckett – Clavinet (1, 3)
- Roger Powell – synthesizer treatments (2), nose flute (4), synthesizer solo (5), synthesizer programming, creative assistance (7)
- Bob Rose – rhythm guitar (5)
- John Siegler – bass (1, 5)
- Rick Derringer – bass (3), guitar (6)
- John Miller – bass (4)
- Dan Hartman – bass (6)
- Kevin Ellman – drums (1, 3)
- John Wilcox – drums (3)
- Roy Markowitz – drums (4)
- Rick Marotta – drums (5)
- Bernard Purdie – drums (5)
- Chris Parker – drums (6)
- Barry Lazarowitz – drums (6)
- Lee Pastora – congas (4, 5), bongos (4)
- Barbara Burton – percussion (4)
- David Sanborn – saxophone solo (5)
- Edgar Winter – saxophone (6)

=== Technical ===
- Produced and mixed by Todd Rundgren
- Engineered by Todd Rundgren (1, 2, 7) and Jack Malken (3–6)
- Cover art – Todd Rundgren
- Lettering – Hal Fiedler

== Charts ==
Album

Chart (1975)	Position
Billboard Pop Albums	86

"Real Man"

Chart (1975)	Position
Billboard Hot 100	83
