= Redux '92: Live in Japan =

Live album by Utopia
- Released: May 18, 1993
- Recorded: May 10, 1992
- Venue: Kan-i Hoken Hall (Tokyo)
- Genre: Rock
- Length: 78:48
- Label: Rhino/WEA
- Producer: Todd Rundgren

Utopia chronology
Trivia (1986)	Redux '92: Live in Japan (1993)

Professional ratings
Review scores
Source	Rating
Allmusic	2.5/5 stars

Redux '92: Live in Japan is an album by the rock band Utopia recorded live on May 10, 1992 at Gotanda Kan-i Hoken Hall in Tokyo, Japan and released in 1993. It captures the band's reunion six years after it had disbanded in 1986. The album ostensibly consists of the "best of" as selected by the members Todd Rundgren, Roger Powell, Kasim Sulton, and John "Willie" Wilcox. A companion video of the same performance was released on DVD and VHS tape.

== Track listing ==
All tracks are written by Todd Rundgren, Roger Powell, Kasim Sulton, and Willie Wilcox, except where noted.

No.	Title	Writer(s)	Lead vocals	Length
1.	"Fix Your Gaze"		Rundgren	4:23
2.	"Zen Machine"		Powell	4:41
3.	"Trapped"	Rundgren	Sulton; Rundgren	3:09
4.	"Princess of the Universe"		Wilcox	3:28
5.	"Abandon City"	Powell; Rundgren	Powell	4:55
6.	"Hammer in My Heart"		Rundgren	4:29
7.	"Swing to the Right"		Sulton	4:57
8.	"The Ikon"	Rundgren; John Siegler; Ralph Schuckett; Mark "Moogy" Klingman		4:38
9.	"Hiroshima"	Powell; Rundgren	Rundgren; Sulton	7:24
10.	"Back on the Street"	Rundgren	Sulton; Rundgren	4:27
11.	"Only Human"		Rundgren	6:19
12.	"Love in Action"	Rundgren	Rundgren	3:41
13.	"Caravan"		Powell	7:56
14.	"Last of the New Wave Riders"		Rundgren; Sulton	5:27
15.	"One World"		Rundgren	3:27
16.	"Love Is the Answer"	Rundgren	Rundgren	5:20
Total length:				78:48

== Personnel ==
=== Utopia ===
- Todd Rundgren – guitar, vocals
- Roger Powell – keyboards, Kurzweil synthesizer, vocals
- Kasim Sulton – bass, vocals
- John "Willie" Wilcox – drums, vocals

=== Technical ===
- Produced and mixed by Todd Rundgren
- House sound engineer – Larry Toomey
- Mastered by Todd Rundgren and Ken Perry
- Tour producer – Masahiro Hidaka
- Tour managers – Mary Lou Arnold and Dai Ogawa
- Production manager – Joe Lamond
- Art direction – Geoff Gans
- Design – Monster X
- Caricatures – Prairie Prince
- Management – Eric Gardner
