= Feets, Don't Fail Me Now (disambiguation) =

Feets, Don't Fail Me Now is a 1979 album by Herbie Hancock.

It or similar phrases may also refer to:

- Feet Don't Fail Me Now 2004 video by Switchfoot
- Feet Don't Fail Me Now, a 1982 song by Utopia from their eponymous album
- Feats Don't Fail Me Now, a 1974 album by Little Feat
- My Feet Can't Fail Me Now, a 1984 album by Dirty Dozen Brass Band
- Feet, Don't Fail Me Now, a 2014 song by Needtobreathe from Rivers in the Wasteland
- Feet Don't Fail Me Now, a 2016 song by Foxes from All I Need
- Feet Don't Fail Me Now, a 2021 single by Joy Crookes
- "Feet Don't Fail Me", a 2017 song by Queens of the Stone Age from Villains
