= Oblivion (Utopia album) =

Studio album by Utopia
- Released: January 1984
- Recorded: 1983
- Studio: Utopia Sound Studios (Lake Hill)
- Genres: Rock; new wave
- Length: 41:28
- Label: Passport
- Producers: Todd Rundgren; Utopia

Utopia chronology
Utopia (1982)	Oblivion (1984)	POV (1985)

Singles from Oblivion
- 1. "Maybe I Could Change" Released: 1983; 2. "Crybaby" Released: May 1984; 3. "Love With A Thinker" Released: June 1984

Professional ratings
Review scores
Source	Rating
Allmusic	2.5/5 stars

Oblivion is the eighth studio album by American rock group Utopia, released in January 1984 by Passport Records.

The album represents a turning point for the band, stepping away from the stripped-down sound of their 1982 self-titled album in favor of a fuller, more mainstream contemporary pop sound. This direction was continued on POV, the band's final studio album, released the following year. This shift in sound is most noticeable due to an increased use of electronic drums and triggers by John "Willie" Wilcox. In addition, synthesizers and sequencers, common ingredients of Utopia's music dating back to their debut release, feature more heavily than usual across the album's runtime.

The album generated moderate sales, peaking at #74 on the Billboard 200 in March 1984. Three songs were released as singles: "Crybaby" b/w "Winston Smith Takes It on the Jaw", which peaked at #30 on Billboard's Mainstream Rock chart in February 1984, becoming their biggest hit on that chart; "Love With a Thinker" b/w "Welcome to My Revolution" (released only in the UK); and "Maybe I Could Change" b/w "Love With a Thinker" (released only in Australia). The latter two failed to chart.

== Track listing ==
All tracks are written by Todd Rundgren, Roger Powell, Kasim Sulton, and Willie Wilcox.

Side one
No.	Title	Lead vocals	Length
1.	"Itch in My Brain"	Rundgren	4:30
2.	"Love with a Thinker"	Sulton	3:15
3.	"Bring Me My Longbow"	Rundgren	3:18
4.	"If I Didn't Try"	Rundgren	4:10
5.	"Too Much Water"	Sulton; Rundgren	4:47

Side two
No.	Title	Lead vocals	Length
6.	"Maybe I Could Change"	Sulton	4:08
7.	"Crybaby"	Rundgren	4:19
8.	"Welcome to My Revolution"	Rundgren	5:01
9.	"Winston Smith Takes It on the Jaw"	Sulton	3:17
10.	"I Will Wait"	Sulton	4:43
Total length:			41:28

== Personnel ==
=== Utopia ===
- Todd Rundgren – vocals, guitar, saxophone
- Kasim Sulton – vocals, bass guitar
- Roger Powell – vocals, keyboards
- John "Willie" Wilcox – vocals, drums

=== Technical ===
- Produced and engineered by Todd Rundgren
- Mixed by Todd Rundgren at Utopia Sound Studios (Lake Hill, NY)
- Photography – Rob G. Hansen

==== 2011 Reissue ====
- Coordinator – Mark Powell and Vicky Powell
- Digital remastering – Ben Wiseman
- Package design – Phil Smee

== Charts ==
Chart (1984)	Peak position
US Billboard Pop Albums	74
