= Air Pocket (album) =

Studio album by Roger Powell
- Released: January 30, 1980
- Recorded: 1979
- Studio: Utopia Sound Studios Woodstock, NY
- Genre: Rock, Art Rock, Prog-Rock
- Label: Bearsville Records
- Producer: Roger Powell

Roger Powell chronology
Cosmic Furnace (1973)	Air Pocket (1980)	Connections to the World (1991)

Air Pocket is the second album by American keyboardist Roger Powell released on Bearsville Records in 1980. It includes 11 tracks all written, performed, and sung by the artist, and features Todd Rundgren on ebow guitar on one track. Other credits include John Holbrook, Cleve Pozar, and Mark Styles. Voted the #1 album of 1980 by a reader poll in Keyboard Magazine. Originally completed in 1976, Bearsville agreed to release "Air Pocket" after releasing a single first to see how much interest there would be. The single "Pipeline '78" B/W "March Of The Dragon Slayers" was released in May 1978 and sold respectfully.

== Track listing ==
All tracks are written by Roger Powell.

No.	Title	Length
1.	"Lunar Plexus"
2.	"Landmark"
3.	"Air Pocket"
4.	"Windows" (Also appears in different form on the Utopia album Oops! Wrong Planet)
5.	"Emergency Splashdown"
6.	"Morning Chorus"
7.	"March Of The Dragonslayers"
8.	"Prophecy"
9.	"Sands of Arrakis"
10.	"Dragons "N' Griffins/Mr Triscuits Theme" (A different version of "Mr Triscuits" appears on the Utopia album Another Live)
11.	"Pipeline '76" (Bonus track on CD reissue)

== Personnel ==
- John Holbrook – rhythm guitar, engineer
- Roger Powell – vocals, synthesizer, keyboards, producer
- Cleve Pozar – drums
- Todd Rundgren – guitar
- Mark Styles – keyboards
- Produced by Roger Powell

== Charts ==
Album - Billboard

Year	Chart	Position
1980	Pop Albums	203
