= Gary Tanin =

Gary Tanin (born Gary Stefan Tanin, 19 September 1952, in Milwaukee, Wisconsin) is a veteran Milwaukee musician, producer, and engineer with a career spanning decades and reflecting two central themes: music and technology.

== Biography ==
At age 16, Tanin had already laid the foundation for his calling when he landed a record deal with Odessa Records, recording his original material.

While attending the University of Wisconsin–Milwaukee during the early 70s, Tanin apprenticed as an audio engineer at ARCO Recording Studios where he studied the Art and Science of audio recording and production. In the mid 70s he released the critically acclaimed, self-produced concept album Otto & The Elevators. In the early 80s he foresaw the unique possibility of combining newly emerging computer technology with music. He produced dozens of artists during the 70s and 80s.

He has had numerous articles published in industry publications, including the CMC Source Book and AfterTouch. These special interests led to Tanin's work with garageband.com co-founder Jerry Harrison (of the rock band Talking Heads).

Harrison contributed to Sublime Nation, Tanin's 1995 solo CD released by MultiMusicaUSA. In addition to Sublime Nation, Gary has released several national critically acclaimed CDs of his own and produced local, national, and international artists. Tanin's Japanese/US release, XPensive Dogs, is an intercontinental fusion of east and west. A follow-up to XPensive Dogs, entitled DOG EAT DOG, was released in 2004. Japanese label Hard Disc International released XPensive Dogs, and Sublime Nation was released in Japan on the Mouse Records imprint. Tanin's entire catalog is being distributed in the US by RockIt Records (USA).

Gary Tanin has produced recordings for Sam Llanas, Daryl Stuermer, and Roger Powell while mastering releases for the likes of ex-Violent Femmes drummer Victor DeLorenzo and Daryl Stuermer (of Phil Collins and Genesis fame). Tanin has won the Wisconsin Area Music Industry (WAMI) Producer of the Year Awards for 2003, 2004, 2005 and 2010. He is a long-standing voting member of The Recording Academy (NARAS), past member of the Audio Engineering Society (AES), and a freelance writer & consultant. His company, Daystorm Music provides record production and mastering services for all audio formats.

Collaborating with Roger Powell (Utopia/Todd Rundgren) on his 2006 solo release "Fossil Poets" Tanin produced Powell's 2009 solo Piano outing "Blue Note Ridge" as well. In 2009 Daystorm Music released "Natural Selection" a definitive compendium citing Tanin's critically acclaimed catalog from the 1970s through 2004. In 2011 Gary Tanin produced Sam Llanas' second solo album "4 A.M. (The Way Home)" and has been managing Llanas' solo career since his departure from the BoDeans. In December 2012 Tanin released the solo album "Love Changes" forty years after the release of his first LP "Love Changes All". In 2013 Tanin added Music Director and Director to his titles with the play "A Day for Grace" by Doug Vincent and Sam Llanas. He produced the soundtrack for the Boulder StoryHealers DVD "A Day for Grace", produced Sam Llanas's live CD "4/5 Live", and in November 2013 released "Otto & The Elevators - 40th Anniversary Edition" on both vinyl LP and CD formats. In 2014 Gary collaborated again with Sam Llanas producing Llanas' fourth solo record entitled "The Whole Night Thru" released 18 November 2014.

== Select discography ==
- Medius – Your Love / Let Me Show You (Odessa, 1969, 45 rpm)
- Gary Tanin – Love Changes All (Vera Records, 1972, LP)
- Gary Tanin – Up Down Lovin / Elevator Operator (Vera Records, 1974, 45 rpm)
- Gary Tanin – Otto & The Elevators (Vera Records, 1975, 45 rpm)
- Gary Tanin – Lady Jane / Suicides No Fun Gimme That Gun (Vera Records, 1976, 45 rpm)
- Billy Wallace Coming Home (Wallace Records 1979, LP)
- Gary Tanin – Lonely Again / Ain't Another Tear (Vera Records, 1981, 45 rpm)
- Victor DeLorenzo – Pancake Day (ALMO/Geffen, 1996, CD)
- Gary Tanin – Sublime Nation (MultiiMusica USA/Mouse Records, 1995, CD)
- XPensive Dogs – XPensive Dogs (Hard Disc, Intl., 1996, CD)
- Absinthe (Sam Llanas) – A Good Day to Die (Llanas Music/MAD, 1998, CD)
- XPensive Dogs – Dog Eat Dog (RockIt Records, 2004, CD)
- Roger Powell – Fossil Poets (Inner Knot, 2006, CD)
- Roger Powell – Fossil Poets (Inner Knot, 2007, LP)
- Daryl Stuermer – Rewired (Unicorn Digital, 2006, CD)
- Daryl Stuermer – Go (InsideOut Music, 2007, CD)
- Roger Powell – Blue Note Ridge (Unicorn Digital, 2009, CD)
- Gary Tanin – Natural Selection (Daystorm, 2010, CD)
- Sam Llanas – 4 A.M. (The Way Home) (Inner Knot, 2011, CD)
- Gary Tanin – Love Changes (Daystorm, 2012, CD)
- Sam Llanas – 4/5 Live (Llanas Music, 2013, CD)
- Doug Vincent / Sam Llanas – A Day for Grace (Boulder StoryHealers, 2013, DVD)
- Gary Tanin – Otto & The Elevators - 40th Anniversary Edition (Daystorm, 2013, CD, LP)
- Sam Llanas – The Whole Night Thru (Llanas Music / OARFIN / E1, 2014, CD)
- Dick Eliot – I'll Remember April (Eli Arts, 2015, CD)
- The Young Revelators – All I See (Daystorm Music, 2016, CD)
- Jack Spann – Time, Time, Time, Time, Time (Big Boo Music, 2016, CD)
- Jack Spann – Beautiful Man From Mars (Big Boo Music / OARFIN, 2017, CD)
- Jack Spann – Beautiful Man From Mars (Big Boo Music / OARFIN, 2017, LP)
- David Fitzpatrick – Parachutes in Hurricanes (Daystorm Music, 2018, CD)
- Sam Llanas – Return of the Goya - Part 1 (Llanas Music / OARFIN, 2018, CD)
- Jack Spann – Propaganda Man (Big Boo Music, 2019, CD)
- Sam Llanas – Return of the Goya - Part 2 (Llanas Music / OARFIN, 2019, CD)
- Sam Llanas – Return of the Goya - Los Ochos Final (Llanas Music / OARFIN, 2019, CD)
