= Touch (1980s band) =

American rock band

Touch is an American rock band from New York City formed in 1978. The band consists of Mark Mangold (songwriter and keyboards), Glen Kithcart (drums), Craig Brooks (guitars), and Doug Howard. Mangold, Kithcart, and Brooks had previously been in the band American Tears and had released three albums under Columbia Records.

== History ==
=== 1974 - 1979: American Tears, Signing to Atco ===
In the early 1970s, Mark Mangold formed the keyboard-driven hard-rock band American Tears with bassist Gary Sonny and drummer Tommy Gunn before signing with Columbia Records. In 1974, American Tears released their debut album, Branded Bad which failed to chart on the Billboard 200 or produce any hit singles. In 1975, Gary Sonny was replaced by Greg Baze and the band released their second album Tear Gas which also failed to chart. In 1977, the band released their final album on Columbia, Powerhouse, which featured new members drummer Glen Kithcart, guitarist Craig Brooks, and bassist Kirk Powers. This album also did not chart and American Tears left Columbia.

In 1978, the band reassembled, changed their name to Touch, and added bassist Doug Howard to their lineup. They began making demos in an attempt to get another record deal, and recorded a demo of "When the Spirit Moves You" at the Power Station. This demo caught the attention of Deep Purple and Rainbow manager Bruce Payne, who helped them get a deal with Atco. Recording for their first album Touch then began with English producer Tim Friese-Greene. This would be released in 1980.

=== 1980: First Album ===
The first single from the album, "When The Spirit Moves You" reached No. 65 on the Billboard Hot 100 and No. 77 on Cashbox Top 100. The second single, "Don't You Know What Love Is," reached No. 69 on the Hot 100, No. 86 on Cashbox. "Don't You Know What Love Is" was played on AOR radio stations in the US during the early 1980s and did particularly well on a specialist Melody Maker chart in UK. In 1981-82, the band also recorded a second album that was produced by Todd Rundgren but it went unreleased.

Touch was the first band to play at the inaugural Monsters of Rock festival at Castle Donington racetrack in 1980. A live version of "Don't You Know What Love Is" also appeared on the compilation LP Monsters of Rock, documenting performances at the festival.

=== Post Break-up ===
Mark Mangold continued to write and record with and for other artists, with one of his earliest collaborators being a then-relatively unknown musician named Michael Bolton. This working relationship began when Mangold co-wrote and performed on Bolton's first solo hit, "Fool's Game", which was featured on the latter artist's self-titled 1983 solo album. The song "I Found Someone," another collaboration with Bolton, was initially recorded by Laura Branigan, though it ultimately became a top-10 hit for Cher.

Furthermore, Craig Brooks also joined Mangold in the studio for Michael Bolton's solo album. In addition to being a fellow co-writer on "Fool's Game," Brooks performed guitar and backing vocals for the album. The following year, he also contributed by singing on Roger Glover's solo album, Mask.

Doug Howard also continued to perform, record and write with acts and artists such as Todd Rundgren, Edgar Winter, Stun Leer, and Roy Buchanan as well as a member of Rundgren's Utopia

=== 2014: Reformation ===
In 2014, Mangold was asked to play Touch songs with a band assembled by the Firefest Festival, including Swedish singer Göran Edman as the lead vocals along with other Swedish musicians. This lineup performed live at the Firefest in Nottingham, England, in October 2014.

=== 2020 onwards ===
In 2020, Mangold announced that all four original members of the band had reunited and were once again working on a new Touch album for release in late 2020. In October 2020, Mangold posted a new Touch song on their YouTube. The album, Tomorrow Never Comes, was released on 6 March 2021.

In October 2023 it was announced that Touch (full original lineup) would perform at Firefest Festival (10 Years After) to be held in the UK at Manchester Academy on 11–13 October 2024. The band preceded headline act Robin McAuley on the Saturday night.

== Personnel ==
- Craig Brooks – guitars, vocals
- Mark Mangold – keyboards, vocals
- Doug Howard – bass guitar, vocals
- Glenn Kithcart – drums, percussion, vocals

== Discography ==
=== Studio albums ===
- Touch (1980)
- Touch II (1982)
- Tomorrow Never Comes (2021)

=== Compilation albums ===
- The Complete Works I & II (1998)
