= Something/Anything? =

Studio album by Todd Rundgren
- Released: February 15, 1972
- Recorded: Late 1971
- Studios: I.D. Sound (Los Angeles); Runt Recorders (Los Angeles); Record Plant (New York); Bearsville (Woodstock)
- Genres: Rock; power pop; R&B; psychedelia; avant-pop
- Length: 90:33
- Label: Bearsville
- Producer: Todd Rundgren

Todd Rundgren chronology
Runt. The Ballad of Todd Rundgren (1971)	Something/Anything? (1972)	A Wizard, a True Star (1973)

Singles from Something/Anything?
- 1. "I Saw the Light / Marlene" Released: March 1972; 2. "Couldn't I Just Tell You / Wolfman Jack" Released: July 1972; 3. "Hello It's Me / Cold Morning Light" Released: December 1972; 4. "Wolfman Jack / Breathless" Released: December 1974

Something/Anything? is the third studio album by American musician Todd Rundgren, released in February 1972 by Bearsville Records. It was Rundgren's first album released under his own name, following two records credited to the quasi-group project Runt, and was also his first double album. It was recorded in late 1971 in Los Angeles, New York City and Bearsville Studios, Woodstock. The album is divided into four sections focused on different stylistic themes; the first three parts were recorded in the studio with Rundgren playing all instruments and singing all vocals in addition to producing. The final quarter contained a number of tracks recorded live in the studio without any overdubs, save for a short snippet of archive recordings from the 1960s.

Over time, Rundgren developed proficiency on other instruments beyond guitar and keyboards, and this, coupled with a general dissatisfaction with studio musicians, led him to temporarily relocate to Los Angeles in an attempt to record an entire album single-handedly. After Rundgren created significantly more material than would fit on a standard LP, an earthquake struck Los Angeles. He decided to head back to New York for some live sessions, with the help of Moogy Klingman, to lighten the mood. These final sessions were held at Bearsville, where the remainder of the recording and mixing took place, resulting in enough material for a double album.

The album peaked at number 29 on the Billboard 200 and was certified gold three years after its release. A single taken from the album, "Hello It's Me", was a top-five hit in the US in late 1973, and it contained a further hit, "I Saw the Light". Something/Anything? later attracted critical acclaim as one of the most significant records of the 1970s. In 2003, the album was ranked number 173 on Rolling Stone magazine's list of the 500 greatest albums of all time, maintaining the rating in a 2012 revised list, and later ranked at number 396 in the 2020 edition. It was voted number 797 in the third edition of Colin Larkin's All Time Top 1000 Albums (2000). After Something/Anything, Rundgren moved away from the straightforward pop ballads present on this album to more experimental and progressive rock in later releases, beginning with A Wizard, A True Star.

== Background ==
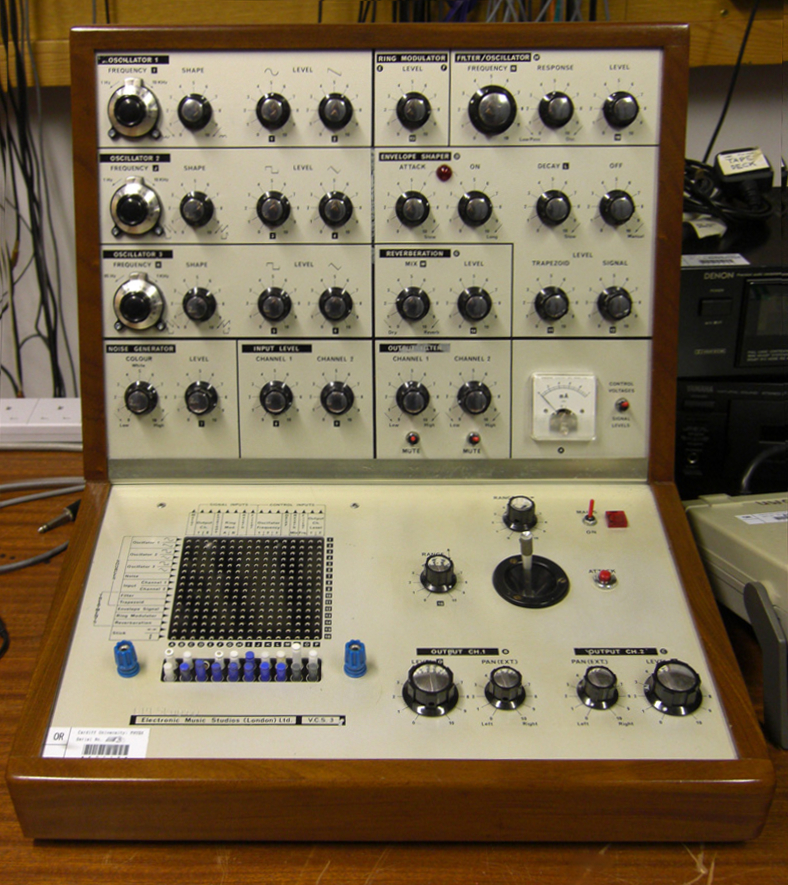
By doing some of the recording at home, Rundgren was able to do more lengthy studio experiments, such as using a Putney VCS3 synthesizer.

By the time Rundgren started recording the album, he had already achieved commercial success as a solo artist and producer, and this increased his self-confidence. He had also become dissatisfied with other musicians playing on his recordings, recalling, "I'd never played drums or bass before, though I would hector those that did." This led him to decide to record the entire album by himself using multi-tracking. He wrote the material for the album at a prolific rate. He attributed his productivity to Ritalin and cannabis, stating that the drugs "caused me to crank out songs at an incredible pace." He found some of the other songs quick to write, too, noting "they were all basically starting out with C Major 7th, and I'd start moving my hand around in predictable patterns until a song came out."

== Recording ==
=== Los Angeles sessions ===
The majority of backing tracks on the first three sides of the album were recorded at I.D. Sound Studios, Los Angeles, engineered by James Lowe with assistance from John Lee. The studio was one of the first independent units in LA, and Lowe believes Rundgren chose it due to the ability to work hands-on without record company interference and having all the latest technology and equipment. Rundgren played every instrument in turn, starting with the drums, noting it "was the logical place to start," with the others individually laid down on top. While recording the drums, Rundgren would try and hum the song in his head to remember where he was, but "if I would screw up, then I would change the song afterwards, to fit the mistake that I had made, because it was easier than going back and fixing it." In retrospect, Rundgren felt he might have performed better with a click track, being a novice drummer at the time, but concluded that the result "sound[s] like a band". He didn't think his lack of technical proficiency on the instrument was a particular handicap, saying that "people comprehend what you're playing, and it has a greater impact." Engineering the album, Lowe recalled he was "mostly working in the dark", and that Rundgren would leave spaces for instruments during recording, spontaneously developing a song as it was being recorded. "I was never sure exactly where the song was going until we'd put down about four or five tracks."

In addition to recording at I.D. Sound, Rundgren took an 8-track recorder and some studio equipment, installing it at his rented home on Astral Drive, Nichols Canyon. 'Intro', 'Breathless', and 'One More Day (No Word)' were recorded here, along with various guitar and keyboard overdubs. A version of 'Torch Song' was also recorded, but was scrapped due to excessive background noise. Rundgren recalled that recording at home meant he could spend time working on pieces of technology or production, such as programming a VCS3 synthesizer, at his leisure without wasting anyone else's time. The artwork on the original gatefold sleeve was also shot in this apartment. Despite working long hours each day in both I.D and at home, with minimum breaks for sleeping and eating, Rundgren said he enjoyed the recording experience, and "wouldn't have had it any other way."

=== New York sessions ===
Rundgren contemplated recording more tracks to make up a double album in a similar manner, but following an earthquake, he decided to relocate to New York City and hold a live recording session at the Record Plant with session players. The basic idea was to create songs with sing-along choruses. Rundgren did not pre-plan who would play on the sessions, but simply wanted anyone who happened to be in or near the studio to turn up and learn the material.

Rundgren contacted Moogy Klingman, who would appear on several tracks and later co-found Utopia with Rundgren. Rundgren instructed Klingman to find the best session players possible for the recording. Klingman recalled getting a phone call from Rundgren late on a Friday evening asking him to find a full band by Sunday morning: "He wanted horns, singers, everything, so I made a ton of phone calls." Klingman said that not everyone could make the entire session, so a variety of musicians, particularly guitarists and bassists, needed to be used. The performers, including Rundgren himself, only rehearsed the songs a few times before committing the performance to tape, in order to sound spontaneous, and some of the banter between takes appears on the finished album.

Three songs were recorded at the Record Plant, including one of Klingman's own, "Dust in the Wind". Guitarist Rick Derringer appeared on one track, and would collaborate with Rundgren in the future. Trumpeter Randy Brecker had been a founding member of Blood, Sweat & Tears and, along with his brother Michael, who also played on the Record Plant sessions, went on to find commercial success with the Brecker Brothers. Trombonist Barry Rogers, who completed the brass section on the Record Plant recordings, had also collaborated with the Brecker brothers in the band Dreams.

A further live session was held at Bearsville Studios in Woodstock, which used some of the members of the Paul Butterfield blues band, resulting in two other tracks. The final track on side four, "Slut", was recorded earlier at a live session in I.D. Sound Studios, and featured previous collaborators Tony and Hunt Sales, guitarist Rick Vito, and future actor Edward James Olmos on backing vocals. The majority of vocals for the existing studio tracks were also recorded at the Record Plant, with additional recording at Bearsville, where the album was mixed. As in Los Angeles, Lowe helped out with the engineering. "We'd just put up a Neumann U67 and he'd sing right there in the control room using the monitors for the playback."

== Songs ==
The liner notes describe the first side of the album as "a bouquet of ear-catching melodies", the second as "the cerebral side", the third as "The kid gets heavy", and the fourth is titled "Baby Needs a New Pair of Snakeskin Boots (A Pop Operetta)". Rundgren wrote the sleeve notes, and included a small operetta that described a narrative between the live tracks. "I Saw the Light" was placed at the start of album, as it was felt to be the most likely hit. The song was influenced by Carole King and written in approximately 20 minutes. "Couldn't I Just Tell You" has had a major influence on artists in the power pop music genre, with music critic Stephen Thomas Erlewine of the All Music Guide calling it one of "the great songs that provided power pop with its foundation". Scott Miller's 2010 book Music: What Happened? calls the song "likely the greatest power pop recording ever made," with lyrics "somehow both desperate and lighthearted at the same time," and a guitar solo having "truly amazing dexterity and inflection."

"Hello It's Me" had been recorded by Rundgren's old band, Nazz. Rundgren explained this unique instance of his re-recording a track by one of his former groups: "I had some sentimental attraction to it as it was the first song I had written. ... during an afternoon session, the songs I really wanted to get were 'Dust in the Wind' and 'You Left Me Sore'. The sessions were going well and 'Hello It's Me' was something I had been thinking about updating. It was done as such a dirge originally, I thought that part could be addressed." As with the rest of the live tracks on side four, little preparation was done for the track. Rundgren later claimed the entire song was rehearsed and recorded in under two hours, and the horn lines and backing vocals at the end of the track were completely improvised. The fourth side was completed by two small extracts of archive recordings featuring Rundgren in the 1960s. The first was a performance of Barrett Strong's "Money (That's What I Want)" by a group with the same name, Money, recorded around 1966, while the second was a clip of "Messin' with the Kid" performed by Woody's Truck Stop in Philadelphia, late 1966.

== Release and reception ==
Professional ratings
Retrospective reviews
Review scores
Source	Rating
AllMusic	5/5 stars
Christgau's Record Guide	A−
The Encyclopedia of Popular Music	5/5 stars
MusicHound Rock	5/5 stars
Pitchfork	9.0/10
Record Collector	5/5 stars
Rolling Stone	4.5/5 stars
The Rolling Stone Album Guide	5/5 stars

Something/Anything was released in February 1972. White-labeled promotional DJ issues of the LP were pressed on colored vinyl—the first record on red vinyl, the second on blue. Billboard reviewed that Rundgren's songs "have an aura of being irreverent, irrelevant little ditties, while in reality they are penetratingly strident observations", and that he seemed to have had fun making the album. "Hello It's Me" was released as a single in September 1973, and reached number five on the Billboard Hot 100. The album originally peaked at No. 50 on the Billboard Top LP's & Tape chart in 1972, but following the release of the "Hello It's Me" single, it re-entered the charts, going on to peak at No. 29 in 1974.

According to The Encyclopedia of Popular Music writer Colin Larkin, the album has since been "rightly regarded as one of the landmark releases of the early 70s". AllMusic especially praised the album's endearing tone and often adventurous variety of styles, commenting that "Listening to Something/Anything? is a mind-altering trip in itself, no matter how many instantly memorable, shamelessly accessible pop songs are scattered throughout the album." Village Voice critic Robert Christgau also applauded the album’s variety: "The many good songs span styles and subjects in a virtuoso display ... And the many ordinary ones are saved by Todd's confidence and verve." Rolling Stone found the songs "perfectly composed" while deeming the record Rundgren's "best-selling, most-enduring work born of desperation", one that "demonstrates his command of the studio, unfurling his falsetto over a kaleidoscope of rock genres". Axl Rose declared in a 1989 Rolling Stone interview that "Today, my favorite record is Todd Rundgren's Something/Anything".

Rundgren himself has been more ambivalent about the album's success and critical acclaim. He has stated several times that since he had already become successful as a producer, he was not as interested in straight commercial pop success as other artists. In particular, he rejected a tag of being "a male Carole King". "With all due respect," he later stated, "I took no comfort in merely being labeled a 'singer / songwriter'." Subsequent albums, beginning with the follow-up A Wizard, A True Star and the spin-off group Utopia, would see a radical shift away from straightforward three-minute pop. The New Yorker deems Something/Anything? to be the first in a sequence of avant-pop albums by Rundgren, but "more pop" where A Wizard, a True Star is "more avant". The singer John Lydon commented that "Something/Anything? is wonderful. So superb, the way he could take a song and then just half-finish it 'cos what's the point, it's already been done, it don't need a repeat of the first verse. I liked that attitude, like Mozart when he didn't finish Requiem."

== Track listing ==
All tracks are written by Todd Rundgren except where noted.

Side one: A Bouquet of Ear-catching Melodies
No.	Title	Length
1.	"I Saw the Light"	2:56
2.	"It Wouldn't Have Made Any Difference"	3:50
3.	"Wolfman Jack"	2:54
4.	"Cold Morning Light"	3:55
5.	"It Takes Two to Tango (This Is for the Girls)"	2:41
6.	"Sweeter Memories"	3:36
Total length:		20:52

Side two: The Cerebral Side
No.	Title	Length
1.	"Intro"	1:11
2.	"Breathless"	3:15
3.	"The Night the Carousel Burned Down"	4:29
4.	"Saving Grace"	4:12
5.	"Marlene"	3:54
6.	"Song of the Viking"	2:35
7.	"I Went to the Mirror"	4:05
Total length:		23:41

Side three: The Kid Gets Heavy
No.	Title	Length
1.	"Black Maria"	5:20
2.	"One More Day (No Word)"	3:43
3.	"Couldn't I Just Tell You"	3:34
4.	"Torch Song"	2:52
5.	"Little Red Lights"	4:53
Total length:		20:22

Side four: Baby Needs a New Pair of Snakeskin Boots (A Pop Operetta)
No.	Title	Length
1.	"Overture–My Roots": "Money (That's What I Want)" (Janie Bradford, Berry Gordy Jr.); "Messin' with the Kid" (Mel London)"	2:29
2.	"Dust in the Wind" (Mark Klingman)	3:49
3.	"Piss Aaron"	3:26
4.	"Hello It's Me"	4:42
5.	"Some Folks Is Even Whiter Than Me"	3:56
6.	"You Left Me Sore"	3:13
7.	"Slut"	4:03
Total length:		25:38

== Personnel ==
Todd Rundgren performs all instruments and vocals, except for the following tracks on side four:

- "Money (That's What I Want)”
  - Todd Rundgren – lead guitar
  - Rick Valente – lead vocals
  - Randy Read – rhythm guitar
  - Collie Read – bass
  - Stockman – drums
- "Messin' with the Kid”
  - No personnel credited
- "Dust in the Wind" (Recorded at the Record Plant, New York)
  - Todd Rundgren – lead vocals, piano
  - Mark Klingman – organ
  - Rick Derringer – guitar
  - John Siegler – bass
  - John Siomos – drums
  - Randy Brecker – trumpet
  - Michael Brecker – tenor sax
  - Barry Rogers – trombone
  - Hope Ruff, Richard Corey, Vicki Robinson, Dennis Cooley, Cecilia Norfleet – backing vocals
- "Piss Aaron” (Recorded at Bearsville Studios, Woodstock)
  - Todd Rundgren – lead vocals, electric piano
  - Amos Garrett – guitar
  - Ben Keith – pedal steel
  - Jim Colgrove – bass
  - Billy Mundi – drums
- "Hello It's Me” (Recorded at the Record Plant, New York)
  - Todd Rundgren – lead vocals, piano
  - Mark Klingman – organ
  - Robbie Kogale – guitar
  - Stu Woods – bass
  - John Siomos – drums
  - Randy Brecker – trumpet
  - Michael Brecker – tenor sax
  - Barry Rogers – trombone
  - Hope Ruff, Richard Corey, Vicki Robinson, Dennis Cooley, Cecilia Norfleet – backing vocals
- "Some Folks Is Even Whiter Than Me” (Recorded at Bearsville Studios, Woodstock)
  - Todd Rundgren – lead vocals, guitar
  - Mark Klingman – piano
  - Ralph Walsh – guitar
  - Bugsy Maugh – bass
  - Billy Mundi – drums
  - Serge Katzen – conga
  - Gene Dinwiddie – tenor sax
- "You Left Me Sore” (Recorded at the Record Plant, New York)
  - Todd Rundgren – lead vocals, piano
  - Mark Klingman – organ
  - Robbie Kogale – guitar
  - Stu Woods – bass
  - John Siomos – drums
  - Hope Ruff, Richard Corey – backing vocals
- "Slut” (Recorded at I.D. Sound Studios, Los Angeles)
  - Todd Rundgren – lead vocals, guitar
  - Rick Vito – guitar
  - Charlie Schoning – piano
  - Tony Sales – bass
  - Hunt Sales – drums
  - Jim Horn – tenor sax
  - John Kelson – tenor sax
  - Brook Baxes, Anthony Carrubba, Henry Fanton, Edward Olmos – backing vocals

== Charts ==
=== Weekly charts ===
Chart (1972–1974)	Peak position
Canadian RPM 100 Albums	34
US Billboard Top LP's & Tape	29
US Cash Box Top 100 Albums	37
US Record World Album Chart	29

=== Singles ===
Year	Single	Chart	Position
1972	"I Saw the Light"	Canada RPM Singles Chart	15
1972	"I Saw the Light"	UK Singles Chart	36
1972	"I Saw the Light"	Billboard Pop Singles	16
1972	"I Saw the Light"	Billboard Adult Contemporary	12
1972	"Couldn't I Just Tell You"	Billboard Pop Singles	93
1973	"Hello It's Me"	Canada RPM Singles Chart	17
1973	"Hello It's Me"	Billboard Pop Singles	5
1973	"Hello It's Me"	Billboard Adult Contemporary	17
1975	"Wolfman Jack"	Billboard Pop Singles	105

== Certifications ==
Organization	Level	Date
RIAA – US	Gold	1975
