= Feet Don't Fail Me Now =

Video by Switchfoot
- Released: (United States) 2004
- Genre: Alternative rock
- Length: 15:00

Feet Don't Fail Me Now is a DVD, produced and distributed exclusively by Switchfoot. It was available briefly on the band's online store and at concerts and other performance venues.

The 15-minute film takes a humorous look into how the band deals with their newfound fame, after coming off their breakout album, The Beautiful Letdown.

The DVD includes footage of what the band does during their time off, including some of the humorous aspects of being on tour. Each band member portrays a certain characteristic throughout the film; Jerome is constantly plagued by bad luck, Jon struggles with his obsession with his gorilla costume, Chad has sleeping problems, and Tim takes up martial arts and trains as a bass ninja.

The film also includes footage of the band "surfing" in Arkansas.

The film concludes by showing footage of the band recording their fifth studio album, Nothing Is Sound.
