= A Wizard, a True Star =

Studio album by Todd Rundgren
- Released: March 2, 1973
- Recorded: 1972–1973
- Studios: Secret Sound (New York); Advantage Sound (New York)
- Genres: Progressive pop; psychedelia; avant-pop; R&B
- Length: 55:56
- Label: Bearsville
- Producer: Todd Rundgren

Todd Rundgren chronology
Something/Anything? (1972)	A Wizard, a True Star (1973)	Todd (1974)

A Wizard, a True Star is the fourth studio album by the American musician Todd Rundgren, released on March 2, 1973 by Bearsville Records. It marked a departure from his previous album, Something/Anything? (1972), featuring fewer straightforward pop songs, a development he attributed to his experimentation with psychedelic drugs and his realization of "what music and sound were like in my internal environment, and how different that was from the music I had been making."

The album was produced, engineered, and largely performed by Rundgren alone. He envisioned it as a hallucinogenic-inspired "flight plan" with all the tracks segueing seamlessly into each other, starting with a "chaotic" mood and ending with a medley of his favorite soul songs. At the time of release, he stated that Wizard intended to advance utopian ideals; later, he said that the album had no definite meaning. No singles were issued from the album, as he wanted the tracks to be heard in the context of the LP. With 19 tracks, its nearly 56-minute runtime made it one of the longest single-disc LPs to date.

Upon release, A Wizard, a True Star received widespread critical acclaim, but sold poorly, reaching number 86 on the U.S. charts. According to Rundgren, "the result was a complete loss of about half of my audience at that point." Rundgren formed Utopia, his first official band since the Nazz, to tour in support of the album. Their technologically ambitious stage show was cancelled after about two weeks on the road. A Wizard, a True Star has since been recognized for its influence on later generations of bedroom musicians.

== Background ==
In February 1972, Something/Anything? was issued as Todd Rundgren's third solo album, and his first credited under his own name rather than the sobriquet "Runt". It included many songs that would become among his best-known, as well as extended jams and studio banter. After the album's success, critics hailed Rundgren as the spiritual successor to the 1960s studio experiments of the Beatles and the Beach Boys' Brian Wilson; Rundgren became uncomfortable when these descriptions also came to include "the male Carole King" in reference to the album's singles "I Saw the Light" and "Hello It's Me". "With all due respect to Carole King," he said, "It wasn't what I was hoping to create as a musical legacy for myself."

Rundgren returned to New York, and for the first time in his life, started experimenting with psychedelic drugs. To his recollection, this included DMT, mescaline, psilocybin, and possibly LSD. (Note: His first experience was with DMT, however, he never took it again as he did not enjoy the trip.) He began to think that the writing on Something/Anything? was largely formulaic, and sought to create a "more eclectic and more experimental" follow-up album. His music tastes also had started to lean toward the progressive rock of artists such as Frank Zappa, Yes, and Mahavishnu Orchestra. He explained, "It wasn't like I suddenly threw away everything that I was doing before and decided that I was going to play the music of my mind", rather, the experiences allowed him "to actively put some of [my songwriting habits] away and to absorb new ideas and to also hear the final product in a different way." However, he "wasn't really aware, at that time, that I'd make such a radical shift".

== Production ==
The sound and structure of Wizard was heavily informed by Rundgren's hallucinogenic experiences. He said, "It was very ADD ... and I wouldn't dwell on whether a musical idea was complete or not." Rundgren and keyboardist Moogy Klingman established a professional recording studio, Secret Sound, to accommodate the Wizard sessions. Located at Manhattan's 24th Street, the studio was designed to Rundgren's specifications and was created so that he could freely indulge in sound experimentation without having to worry about hourly studio costs. To this effect, he said, "I had the idea that a synthesizer was supposed to sound like a synthesizer, instead of sounding like strings or horns."

Two or three months were spent building the studio; the expenses were ultimately paid by the royalties gained from Something/Anything? and the $10,000 advance given to Klingman for his second solo album (Moogy II, co-produced by Rundgren). Rundgren remembered: "I have to say that, in some sense, A Wizard, a True Star was kind of rushed through because the studio wasn't finished. ... a lot of it seemed sorta ad hoc." According to Klingman, the studio equipment "was breaking down all the time" and was "barely held together with band-aids and bubble gum." The two differed in their recollection of the first song recorded for the album; Rundgren thought it was "Sometimes I Don't Know What to Feel", whereas Klingman believed it was "International Feel".

Rundgren provided a host of instruments and equipment, including vibraphones, organs, keyboards, Fairchild equalizers, and a Stephens 16-track tape recorder. Depending on the track, he either played all of the instruments alone or with assistance from Moogy & the Rhythm Kingz, a band that included Klingman, drummer John Siomos, keyboardist Ralph Schuckett, and bassist John Siegler. Rundgren encouraged the musicians to contribute any ideas they felt would benefit the music. According to Siegler, "when Todd needed guys to play on his record, we were already there. It was like a club. Secret Sound was our clubhouse, and suddenly Todd was the leader of the club." He said a typical session involved Rundgren arriving with a piece of music, written on piano or guitar and often untitled, which the band would learn by ear and create charts for if necessary. Vocals were not recorded until after a basic track was completed. Rundgren was also the sole engineer; as Klingman recounted, "he would go in the control room and set levels and come out and then he would run back in and adjust the levels. It was astonishing to watch, but that's how he liked to work."

Wizard was one of the longest single-disc LPs ever cut, and its 55:56 playing time stretched the technical limits of how much music could fit on a vinyl record. As each side was much longer than a typical album side, the groove spacing on the vinyl album had to be narrower, causing a significant drop in volume and sound quality. Rundgren acknowledged this issue on the album's inner sleeve and advised listeners to turn up the volume on their speakers to compensate. All of the album's recording was at Secret Sound, except for the closing track, "Just One Victory", which was recorded earlier at Advantage Studios.

== Style and concept ==
A Wizard, a True Star incorporates elements of progressive rock, psychedelic rock, show tunes, bubblegum pop, and Philadelphia soul. Other influences were drawn from jazz and funk; Schuckett said that Rundgren often spoke of Maurice Ravel as his favorite classical composer at the time before adding, "I don't think Todd really listened to much funk, so [me and Moogy] were kind of showing him that stuff." Overall, music writers have described Wizard as a work of progressive pop, psychedelia, avant-pop, and R&B.

It was fairly early on in my psychedelic explorations, so everything at that point is just pretty colors and this world of new discoveries. A Wizard, a True Star is just like a baby trying to get back to an un-imprinted point where all of this input doesn't necessarily have a preconceived meaning. I left it up to the listener to place it somewhere or rank it, evaluate it, remember it, forget it, whatever.

— Todd Rundgren, 2010

In the original liner notes, Rundgren explained of the album's title that he was "not a real star ... just a musical representative of certain human tendencies: the Quest for Knowledge and the Quest for Love." Although he denied that the record should be considered a concept album, Wizard was envisioned as a "flight plan" with all the tracks segueing seamlessly into each other, starting with a "chaotic" mood and ending with a medley of his favorite soul songs.

The album's first side is titled "The International Feel (In 8)". Its tracks pivot radically between different musical moods and includes Rundgren's rendition of "Never Never Land", from the 1954 musical adaptation of Peter Pan, as well as "Rock and Roll Pussy", a song criticizing the attitudes of John Lennon and other so-called "limousine radicals". (Note: In 1974, Rundgren and Lennon were embroiled in a minor feud over comments Rundgren made in the February edition of Melody Maker magazine. They called a truce shortly afterward.) The other side, "A True Star", is mostly occupied by ballads, including a medley of the soul songs "I'm So Proud" by the Impressions, "Ooh Baby Baby" by the Miracles, "La La Means I Love You" by the Delfonics, and "Cool Jerk" by the Capitols. Rundgren explained the meaning of the medley: "It's like opening up a hole in your memory and suddenly these memories – soul records you loved, say – start leaking out from who knows where. That's another aspect of psychedelic drugs sometimes, hearing and seeing things that wouldn't be familiar to you if you weren't so psychedelic. You suddenly see them differently and they convey a different meaning."

Musicologist Daniel Harrison likened Wizard to late 1960s Beach Boys work such as Smiley Smile, specifically in that the albums shared musical aspects such as "abrupt transitions, mixture of various pop styles, and unusual production effects." Harrison added that few artists in this period chose to emulate the Beach Boys' experiments due to the band's poor commercial standing. However, Rundgren said that adapting his sound to meet commercial expectations was never an issue for him since he already made "so much money from production", a rare luxury for an artist. He recalled that Bearsville owner Albert Grossman, however, was "surprisingly" encouraging of Wizard. Klingman remembered Grossman walking in on a session of "Da Da Dali" to find Rundgren singing like Al Jolson while the band played "all wrong notes", and yet "Albert didn't miss a beat. ... He just kept silent and nodded like everything was fine."

In a 1973 interview, Rundgren suggested that he aimed to advance utopian ideals with the album, and that Wizard was the first album not to rely on "complete songs" to determine feel, pacing, length, or mood. He then predicted that the public may eventually "take rock and roll musicians more seriously than they take politicians." Elsewhere, in 1972, he claimed that "what I'm doing isn't even really music, because deep inside of me, what I want to do is much greater than music. Music is the way I understand how to communicate now ... but it will eventually have to go beyond that." Music writer Bob Stanley commented that, with Wizard, Rundgren combined all his musical passions, such as "bits of Gershwin, Weimar cabaret and a fight between electronic dogs", into "a red-blooded synth stew".

== Packaging ==
The original painting by Arthur Wood, before it was cut and cropped for various releases

Wizard was packaged in an unconventionally-shaped album cover. The surrealistic painting on the front cover was designed by Arthur Wood. He included coded messages in the image, which Rundgren referenced in a 2009 interview:

He had this little language that he invented, and there are these sort of rhythm-like things coursing through the artwork, there's this runic sort of stuff in there. I think it was secret love messages to his girlfriend or something like that, nothing really earth-shattering. He never explained to me what they really meant, so I wouldn't know. I just pretty much saw a painting of his in a gallery window, and I liked the combination of this sort of old classical style with a bizarro symbolically almost Dali-esque symbology. I also liked the way he drew two perspectives at once, the front perspective and the profile at the same time. The whole thing to me just represented graphically what I was going for musically, and I sat for him for a couple of sessions, and he essentially just painted it, and I didn't instruct him at all what it was supposed to resemble.

Also included within the die-cut album cover was a poem by Rundgren's friend Patti Smith, "Star Fever", written on an enlarged Band-Aid facsimile. It also included a postcard that asked the listener to "send this card in and we'll put your name on the next record." Rundgren credited both of these features as Grossman's ideas.

== Release and Utopia tour ==
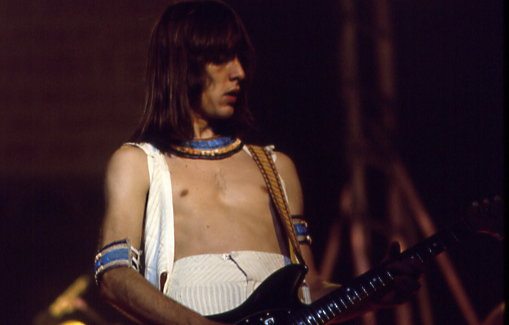
Rundgren performing with Utopia, circa 1976

A Wizard, a True Star was released on March 2, 1973 and charted at number 86 on the Billboard 200. At Rundgren's behest, no singles were issued from the album, as he wanted the tracks to be heard in the context of the LP. Its release coincided with the success of the "Hello It's Me" single. Bearsville executive Paul Fishkin spoke about the label's "bad luck with timing" and explained "Todd was off on his psychedelic adventure, and then a year later 'Hello' becomes a hit. At which point, we're up against Todd in a completely different mindspace ..." Rundgren refused to issue five more potential singles from Something/Anything?. The album failed to chart in the UK.

Utopia as a group is to convince people of the potential reality of the concept. Utopia isn't even the greatest potential reality, it's just what we can afford now. We're the Disneyland of rock and roll bands. Anyone can get into it with a little bit of effort.

— Todd Rundgren, March 1973

Wizard marked the beginning of more experimental ventures that Rundgren further explored with the band Utopia. As the album was scheduled for release, he prepared a technologically ambitious stage show with the newly formed group, his first official band since the Nazz. The tour began in April and was cancelled after only a couple weeks on the road.

Once Rundgren was finished with other production duties, he began formulating plans for an improved configuration of Utopia, but first returned to Secret Sound to record the more synthesizer-heavy double album Todd, which was more material drawing on his hallucinogenic experiences. (Note: This sequence of events reflected the lyric of "International Feel" ("Wait another year / Utopia is here").) "A Dream Goes on Forever", a song originally written for Wizard, was recorded for Todd.

== Critical reception ==
Retrospective professional reviews
Review scores
Source	Rating
AllMusic	5/5 stars
Christgau's Record Guide	B−
Creem	B+
The Encyclopedia of Popular Music	4/5 stars
MusicHound Rock	5/5 stars
Pitchfork	8.8/10
The Rolling Stone Album Guide	3/5 stars
Sputnikmusic	5/5 stars

Despite poor sales, Wizard received widespread critical acclaim. Patti Smith wrote in her review for Creem: "Blasphemy even the gods smile on. Rock and roll for the skull. A very noble concept. Past present and tomorrow in one glance. Understanding through musical sensation. Todd Rundgren is preparing us for a generation of frenzied children who will dream in animation." NME's Nick Kent wrote that it was "a great record", praising its "versatility", and ended his review by saying it was "already destined to be one of my ten best-dressed of '73, and you deserve a kick in the pants if you don't purchase it." Ron Ross of Phonograph Record deemed "Zen Archer" to be "Todd's most gorgeous single achievement yet" and said that the album "should stand as a final testament to the powerful musical and emotional emancipations of the 60s." Playboy described it as "the usual maddening Rundgren smorgasbord", however, "[t]he first side is even more weird, incoherent, funny and, somehow, brilliant. Todd is surely not, as one of his titles would have it, 'Just Another Onionhead.'" Jerry Gilbert of Sounds said the album was "truly amazing".

The record elicited some mixed reactions. Billboard wrote: "Certainly an unusual LP from the singer/writer/producer, filled with varying vocal styles, strange sounds courtesy of Moogs and other exotic instruments, and fine songs from Rundgren and others. Set takes some time to grow, but ... FM stations should have a ball with this one. Somewhat less favorably, Creem's Robert Christgau deemed Rundgren "a minor songwriter with major woman problems who's good with the board and has a sense of humor". Rolling Stone's James Isaacs gave a mixed review of the album, calling it the artist's "most experimental, and annoying, effort to date ... I doubt that even the staunchest Rundgren cultists will want to subject themselves to most of the japery on side one, which would be better suited for a cartoon soundtrack. On the other hand, side two's restraint, its brimming good humor and its ambience of innocence is irresistible, and helps save A Wizard, A True Star from total disaster."

Among retrospective assessments of Wizard, music journalist Barney Hoskyns called the record "the greatest album of all time ... a dizzying, intoxicating rollercoaster ride of emotions and genre mutations [that] still sounds more bravely futuristic than any ostensibly cutting-edge electro-pop being made in the 21st Century." (Note: He added, "While everyone else in his peer group was doing drugs, he refused them. When they stopped doing LSD, he started tripping ... For him it was a badge of honor to be different.") In MusicHound Rock (1996), Christopher Scapelliti described Wizard as "a fascinating sonic collage that skews his pop-star image 180 degrees". Evan Minsker of Pitchfork called it "a trippy, constantly moving album that's as psychedelically detailed as it is (intentionally) creepy—not unlike the Sparks record [Rundgren] had recently helmed." Sam Richards of The Guardian called the album "harmonically richer and more ambitiously deranged than The White Album" and claimed that it "prefigured Prince's Purple Rain by a decade." Mojo magazine's editors deemed it "his finest hour." In 2006, the album was included in the book 1001 Albums You Must Hear Before You Die.

Conversely, Ben Sisario wrote in The Rolling Stone Album Guide (2004) that Wizard was "an endurance test of stylistic diversity, with just three fully realized songs ('Sometimes I Don't Know What to Feel,' 'International Feel,' and 'Just One Victory') stranded in the midst of so much half-baked sonic decoration."

== Influence and legacy ==
In 2017, Rundgren delivered a commencement speech at Berklee College of Music in which he reflected on Wizard:

I made this crazy record called A Wizard, a True Star, in which I threw out all the rules of record making and decided I would try to imprint the chaos in my head onto a record without trying to clean it up for everyone else’s benefit. The result was a complete loss of about half of my audience at that point. But … Trent Reznor and other artists have cited that as being a major influence on them and so I have a special pride for what essentially was my act of tyranny after having achieved commercial success. This became the model for my life after that.

Admirers of the album include Tame Impala, Simian Mobile Disco, Daft Punk, and Hot Chip. According to Stanley, the album's effervescent sound "predicted Prince in its playful R&B fizz, and a swathe of twenty-first-century electropop acts from the Avalanches to Hot Chip". "International Feel" was prominently featured in the opening scene of Daft Punk's 2006 film Electroma. In 2018, Pitchfork's Sam Sodomsky noted that the "fingerprints" of Wizard remain "evident on bedroom auteurs to this day, from Ariel Pink to Frank Ocean, who sampled its synths on 2016's Blonde." Jellyfish and Imperial Drag co-founder Roger Joseph Manning Jr. praised the record for its unusual sound: "Stuff is distorting. Parts are panned all crazy; there’s so much nuttiness going on, but it ends up enhancing his songs because it adds that much more charm and character."

There was no consideration to perform the album in its entirety at the time of release due to the difficulty in reproducing many of its sounds. "Just One Victory" did become a staple of Rundgren's concert performances as a set closer; he later remarked that "People get pissed if we don't do it." In 2009, he toured Wizard for the first time, playing the album in its entirety. The concerts featured elaborate theatrical effects and numerous costume changes. A second tour of the album was scheduled for 2020.

== Track listing ==
All tracks are written by Todd Rundgren except where noted.

Side one – "The International Feel (in 8)"
No.	Title	Length
1.	"International Feel"	2:50
2.	"Never Never Land" (Betty Comden, Adolph Green, Jule Styne)	1:34
3.	"Tic Tic Tic It Wears Off"	1:14
4.	"You Need Your Head"	1:02
5.	"Rock and Roll Pussy"	1:08
6.	"Dogfight Giggle"	1:05
7.	"You Don't Have to Camp Around"	1:03
8.	"Flamingo"	2:34
9.	"Zen Archer"	5:35
10.	"Just Another Onionhead; Da Da Dali"	2:23
11.	"When the Shit Hits the Fan; Sunset Blvd."	4:02
12.	"Le Feel Internacionale"	1:51
Total length:		26:21

Side two – "A True Star"
No.	Title	Length
1.	"Sometimes I Don't Know What to Feel"	4:16
2.	"Does Anybody Love You?"	1:31
3.	"Medley": 1. "I'm So Proud" (Curtis Mayfield); 2. "Ooh Baby Baby" (Smokey Robinson, Warren "Pete" Moore); 3. "La La Means I Love You" (William Hart, Thom Bell); 4. "Cool Jerk" (Donald Storball)"	10:34
4.	"Hungry for Love"	2:18
5.	"I Don't Want to Tie You Down"	1:56
6.	"Is It My Name?"	4:01
7.	"Just One Victory"	4:59
Total length:		29:35

== Personnel ==
Credits adapted from the album's liner notes and Mojo.

- Todd Rundgren – vocals, guitars, keyboards, synthesizers, bass guitar, drums, percussion, saxophone, electronics

=== Moogy & the Rhythm Kingz ===
- Mark "Moogy" Klingman – keyboards
- Ralph Schuckett – keyboards
- John Siegler – bass guitar, cello
- John Siomos – drums

==== Additional musicians ====
- Jean-Yves "M. Frog" Labat – synthesizer
- Rick Derringer – guitar
- Michael Brecker – saxophone
- Randy Brecker – trumpet
- Barry Rogers – trombone
- David Sanborn – saxophone
- "Buffalo" Bill Gelber – bass guitar
- Tom Cosgrove – guitar

=== Technical ===
- Produced and arranged by Todd Rundgren
- Engineered and mastered by Bob Ludwig
- Album design and photography – Jansen, Eding, Clapper
- Cover painting – Arthur Wood

== Charts ==
Chart (1973)	Peak position
US Billboard Top LP's & Tape	86
US Cash Box Top 100 Albums	99
US Record World Album Chart	84
