= Utopia (band) =

American rock band

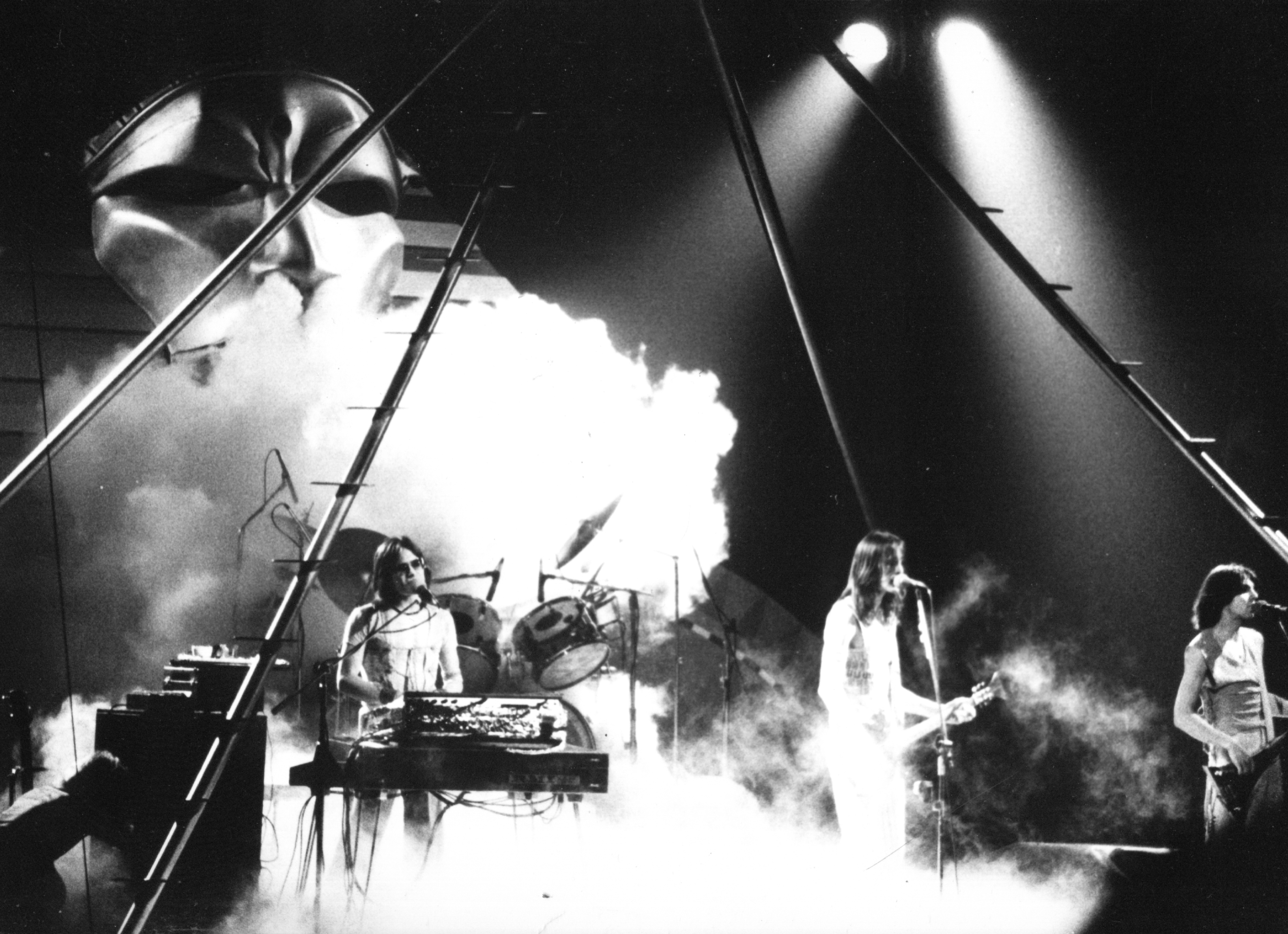
- Utopia, 1977. L–R: Roger Powell, Willie Wilcox, Todd Rundgren and Kasim Sulton

Background information
- Also known as: Todd Rundgren's Utopia (1973–1976, 2011, 2018)
- Origin: New York City, United States
- Genres: Rock; new wave; progressive rock (early); power pop (1980s)
- Years active: 1973–1986; 1992; 2011; 2018
- Labels: Bearsville, Network, Passport, Epic, Rhino
- Past members: Todd Rundgren; Jean Yves "M. Frog" Labat; David Mason; Hunt Sales; Tony Sales; Mark "Moogy" Klingman; Ralph Schuckett; Kevin Ellman; John Siegler; Roger Powell; John "Willie" Wilcox; Kasim Sulton; Doug Howard; Jesse Gress; Gil Assayas

Utopia was an American rock band formed in 1973 by Todd Rundgren. During its first three years, the group was a progressive rock band with a somewhat fluid membership known as Todd Rundgren's Utopia. Most of the members in this early incarnation also played on Rundgren's solo albums of the period up to 1975. By 1976, the group was known simply as Utopia and featured a stable quartet of Rundgren, Kasim Sulton, Roger Powell and John "Willie" Wilcox. This version of the group gradually abandoned progressive rock for more straightforward rock and pop.

In 1980, they had a top 40 hit with "Set Me Free". Though often thought of as a Rundgren-oriented project, all four members of Utopia wrote, sang, produced and performed on their albums; "Set Me Free", for example, was sung by Sulton. The group broke up in 1986, but reunited briefly in 1992. In 2011 the earlier prog-rock incarnation known as Todd Rundgren's Utopia was revived for a series of live shows. In 2018 Rundgren, Sulton, and Wilcox reunited for a tour with new keyboardist Gil Assayas under the name Todd Rundgren's Utopia.

== History ==
=== Todd Rundgren's Utopia ===
On his 1973 album A Wizard, a True Star, Rundgren had sung the line "Wait another year, Utopia is here."

For a short period of time (1973–74) Todd Rundgren's Utopia consisted of Rundgren plus Hunt Sales and Tony Fox Sales together with the late David Mason (a musician from Florida, not to be confused with the former Traffic guitarist Dave Mason) and "M. Frog" (Jean-Yves Labat), who initially played rhythm guitar and later synthesizers. However, the Sales brothers had left by the time the band recorded its first release, being replaced by percussionist Kevin Ellman and bassist John Siegler.

The first two albums — Todd Rundgren's Utopia (1974) and Another Live (1975) — featured lengthy, complex and highly arranged progressive rock pieces, performed by a six-piece multi-instrumental ensemble composed of Todd Rundgren (guitar and vocals), Kevin Ellman (drums and percussion), John Siegler (acoustic and electric basses and cello), Mark "Moogy" Klingman (keyboards), Jean-Yves Labat (now on synths), and Ralph Schuckett (keyboards). Klingman had played with Rundgren as early as his first album Runt (1970); both Klingman and Siegler had played on Side 4 of Rundgren's third album Something/Anything (1972), and together with Schuckett they had also played on Rundgren's fourth album A Wizard, A True Star (1973). Meanwhile, Rundgren had played on Labat's solo album M. Frog (1973). Ellman debuted with Rundgren on the album Todd (1974).

The debut album contained only four tracks and ran for almost sixty minutes total, opening with "Utopia Theme" — recorded live in concert — and closing with the extended concept piece "The Ikon", which ran more than thirty minutes and took up all of side two of the album. Soon after this first album was completed, Labat left the band. The remaining five-piece lineup was referred to by Rundgren as the "Rhythm Kings" and recorded the song "Real Man", later released on Rundgren's 1975 album Initiation, along with other Rundgren solo material. Former Moog programmer Roger Powell joined the band on synthesizer, restoring it to a sextet. Ellman left the band to become an executive at his family's Beefsteak Charlie's restaurant. He was replaced by John "Willie" Wilcox, who had been the drummer with Hall & Oates on the Rundgren-produced War Babies (1974) album.

The live LP Another Live (1975) featured new members Powell and Wilcox. The record showcased several extended progressive tracks which were not released in studio versions and also displayed Rundgren's continuing interest in the Broadway musical via a version of "Something's Coming" from West Side Story. Also included was "Do Ya" (1972), written by Jeff Lynne and originally recorded by The Move; the liner notes characterized this recording as a return gesture for the Move's having recorded "Open My Eyes", a song written by Rundgren and recorded by his earlier band the Nazz. Shortly after these sessions, Schuckett and Klingman both left the band, leaving Powell as the lone keyboard player.

On October 9, 1975, Utopia played their first UK concert at the Hammersmith Odeon in London with the trimmed-down lineup of Rundgren, Siegler, Powell and Wilcox, with backing vocals by future soul star Luther Vandross and Anthony Hinton (a former member of Vandross' early 1970s vocal quintet Luther). This concert was recorded by the BBC for broadcast and has since been widely bootlegged. The audio material from this concert was released in 2012 on Floating World Records' Todd Rundgren's Utopia Live at Hammersmith Odeon '75.

In 1976, the Rundgren/Powell/Siegler/Wilcox lineup of Utopia recorded an instrumental album entitled Disco Jets, which included a disco arrangement of the Star Trek theme as well as original compositions. Bearsville Records passed on releasing the album, and it was shelved. (Disco Jets eventually surfaced in 2001 as part of a Rundgren rarities box set, and was finally issued on its own in 2012.) The same lineup recorded Rundgren's 1976 solo album Faithful. Siegler left the group shortly after the recording of this album.

Siegler, Schuckett, and Klingman were among the many musicians who played with Rundgren for the concerts recorded and released as the live double-LP set Back to the Bars in 1978.

=== Utopia ===
By mid-1976, the group became known simply as 'Utopia' and settled into a four-person lineup of Rundgren (guitar, vocals), Kasim Sulton (bass, vocals), Roger Powell (keyboards, vocals) and Willie Wilcox (drums, vocals). This line-up remained stable until the group's demise. All four band members wrote, sang, produced and even engineered material for the band.

The first Utopia album Ra (1977) continued showcasing the group's progressive leanings, opening with an electronic arrangement of the "Overture: Mountaintop and Sunrise" theme (from Bernard Herrmann's score for the 1959 film Journey to the Center of the Earth), but it also contained several shorter, more accessible songs. Utopia's subsequent albums increasingly featured more concise and pop-oriented material that showed the influence of the prevailing new wave trend.

1977's Oops! Wrong Planet was an even more pop-oriented album, and the song "Love Is the Answer" became Utopia's main set-closer. "Love Is the Answer" later became a big hit for England Dan & John Ford Coley, charting No. 1 on the Billboard Adult Contemporary list in 1979, but the Utopia version failed to chart.

Utopia had only one Billboard top 40 hit: "Set Me Free", from their best-selling album Adventures in Utopia (1979), peaking at No. 27 in the US in early 1980. The same year, the band issued the LP Deface the Music, which was an overt pastiche of the Merseybeat and Sgt. Pepper-era music of The Beatles. Though the album received some positive critical notices, the move away from new wave derailed the band's career momentum.

In August 1979, Utopia played at Knebworth Festival in England - billed as Todd Rundgren and Utopia. The headline act at both their appearances at the festival, over two consecutive Saturdays on 4 and 11 August, were Led Zeppelin.

Utopia managed to hold on to their cult status throughout the 1980s with their albums, concert performances and videos that were shown on MTV in its early years. The group had a number of album-oriented rock hits including "Caravan", "Feet Don't Fail Me Now" (co-written by bassist Doug Howard, who replaced Sulton during his brief hiatus from the group in 1982), and "Love in Action". The video for "Feet Don't Fail Me Now" memorably featured the band dressed in insect costumes. The album Swing to the Right (1982) featured satirical political songs, and the Canadian top 40 hit "One World", but its primary purpose was to fulfill the band's recording contract with Bearsville Records, which had stopped promoting the group, concluding that Utopia albums had a guaranteed audience of Rundgren fans but weren't likely to attract new listeners. While the band was without a label, Sulton decided to leave the band and was replaced by Doug Howard; however, once the band signed with Network Records (distributed by Elektra Records), Sulton decided to return and Howard left.

The follow-up self-titled LP Utopia (1982) was the band's first album for Network and spread 15 tracks across an LP and a bonus unlisted EP. In addition, a video album was released. During this time Elektra/Asylum records decided to move their offices from New York to Los Angeles. During the consolidation they decided to cut Network Records out of its distribution causing the label to fold and left Utopia without label support once again. Utopia then signed a three-album deal with Passport Records, then a subsidiary of Jem Records.

The band's final two albums Oblivion (1984) and POV (1985) were neither commercially successful nor critically well-received, partly because the Passport label on which they were issued folded. After issuing the compilation Trivia in 1986, which included tracks from their previous three LPs plus two newly recorded tracks, Utopia split up.

Rundgren had a successful solo career before, during, and after Utopia, as did his bandmates, although to more modest levels. Powell toured with David Bowie for the 1978 live album Stage, and previously worked as protégé for Robert Moog. Powell's solo album Air Pocket was voted No. 1 in 1980 by Keyboard Magazine, but after the demise of Utopia he had to give up performing for some time due to Repetitive Strain Injury (RSI). Prior to Utopia, Wilcox recorded the Rundgren-produced War Babies (1974) album and toured with Hall and Oates. Wilcox was the senior composer and sound designer for NBC Universal Television from 1999 to 2005, and wrote and programmed "We Connect", the No. 1 dance hit for artist Stacey Q. He continues to write and produce for television, film and artists with his company Willie Wilcox Music. Wilcox composed the ringwalk music used by the boxer, Manny Pacquiao. Bassist Kasim Sulton issued a solo LP in 1982, which contained the Canadian top 40 hit "Don't Break My Heart", and has toured as a band leader for Meat Loaf, and performed with Joan Jett and the Blackhearts, Scandal, Hall and Oates, Blue Öyster Cult, and others.

=== Reunions ===
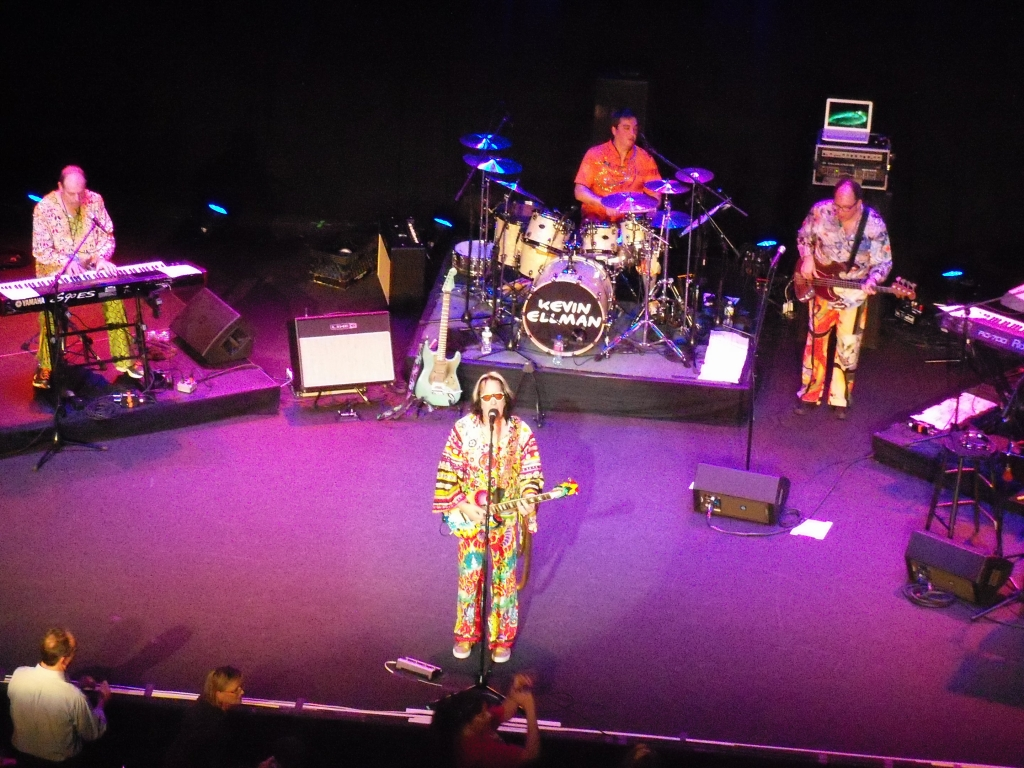
Todd Rundgren and Utopia performing: Schuckett on keyboards, Ellman on drums, Siegler on bass, and Sulton on keyboards, and additional guitarist Jesse Gress, in Boston, November 2011.

Though Utopia officially broke up in 1986, they reunited briefly in 1992, yielding the album Redux '92: Live in Japan, but they were unable to secure a new label arrangement so they disbanded permanently. Various members have continued to work with Rundgren in the years since. In 2005, Rundgren and Sulton began working together again in a new lineup of The Cars using the name The New Cars. After Elliot Easton broke his left clavicle following a tour bus accident, The New Cars took a hiatus. During this hiatus, Kasim took on some work with Meat Loaf and Rundgren to support Bat Out of Hell III: The Monster Is Loose (2006).

Rundgren, Powell, and Sulton were reunited on stage during the debut live presentation of Rundgren's A Wizard, a True Star presented by RundgrenRadio.com in 2009. Due to ongoing health issues with hearing loss and arthritis (which had precipitated his retirement from performing in the 1990s) Powell did not participate in the extended tour, for which he was replaced by founding member Ralph Schuckett, continuing the trend of former Utopia members to remain connected musically.

On January 29–30, 2011, a reunion of most of the members of the 1974 Utopia Mark II band (Rundgren, Moogy Klingman, Ralph Schuckett, John Siegler, and Kevin Ellman) was held for two nights at the Highline Ballroom in New York City. Proceeds from the shows went to defray medical treatment for Klingman's bout with cancer. Material was drawn from the 1972–75 catalogs of Rundgren and Todd Rundgren's Utopia. This marked the first time this lineup performed together in over 35 years. Fellow musicians Jesse Gress and longtime Utopia (1977–86) member Kasim Sulton performed on some of the songs.

Ten months later, in November 2011, the band toured live as "Todd Rundgren's Utopia" for the first time since 1975, with the same lineup of Rundgren, Klingman, Schuckett, Siegler, Ellman, Gress and Sulton. Klingman died on November 15, 2011.

A 4-CD, 2-DVD box set entitled Live from Peekskill and New York City, Todd Rundgren's Utopia - Benefit for Moogy Klingman, was released by Purple Pyramid Records in 2020. It includes the two complete shows from January 29, 2011, at the Highline Ballroom, New York and November 18, 2011, at The Peekskill Performing Arts Center, Peekskill New York.

In late 2017, Sulton put together a Utopia tribute band called Kasim Sulton's Utopia, made up of himself, Jesse Gress (guitar and vocals), Wade Preston (piano and vocals), Christopher Clark (synth and vocals) and Andy Ascolese (drums and vocals). This grouping began touring in February 2018.

In February 2018, Utopia announced it would be touring as "Todd Rundgren's Utopia" starting that spring, with a lineup of Rundgren, Sulton, Wilcox, and Schuckett. In March 2018, the band announced that Schuckett would not be able to participate, and called for keyboardists who are familiar with Utopia's catalog to submit audition tapes. The band ultimately chose Gil Assayas after one of Rundgren's sons saw him perform.

In May 2018, the band performed at the Chicago Theatre, which was recorded and released in April 2019 as a four-disc collection on both DVD & Blu-ray video format and two audio CDs, featuring the new line-up with Assayas on keyboards.

After bowing out of the group's 2018 reunion tour due to unspecified health issues, Ralph Schuckett died on April 7, 2021, at the age of 73. No cause of death was announced. One time guitarist Jesse Gress also died in 2023 at the age of 67.

== Members ==
- Todd Rundgren – lead guitar, lead and backing vocals, saxophone, keyboards (1973–1986, 1992, 2009, 2011, 2018)
- Jean-Yves "M. Frog" Labat – synthesizers, rhythm guitar (1973–1974)
- David Mason – keyboards (1973; died 2013)
- Hunt Sales – drums, percussion (1973)
- Tony Sales – bass, backing vocals (1973)
- Mark "Moogy" Klingman – organ, keyboards, backing vocals, synthesizers (1973–1975, 2011; his death)
- Ralph Schuckett – keyboards, synthesizers, organ, backing and occasional lead vocals (1973–1975, 2011, 2018; died 2021)
- Kevin Ellman – drums, percussion (1973–1975, 2011)
- John Siegler – bass, cello, rhythm guitar, vocals (1973–1976, 2011)
- Roger Powell – synthesizers, keyboards, backing and lead vocals, occasional trumpet and rhythm guitar (1975–1986, 1992, 2009)
- John "Willie" Wilcox – drums, percussion, backing and lead vocals (1975–1986, 1992, 2018)
- Kasim Sulton – bass, lead and backing vocals, synthesizers (1976–1982, 1982–1986, 1992, 2009, 2011, 2018)
- Doug Howard – bass, backing vocals (1982)
- Prairie Prince – drums, percussion (2009)
- Jesse Gress – backing vocals, rhythm guitar (2011; died 2023)
- Gil Assayas – synthesizers, keyboards, backing vocals (2018)

=== Lineups ===
Years	Lineup	Albums
1973	Todd Rundgren – lead guitar, lead vocals; Dave Mason – keyboards; Jean-Yves "M. Frog" Labat – synthesizer; Tony Sales – bass guitar, backing vocals; Hunt Sales – drums
1973–1975	Todd Rundgren – lead guitar & lead vocals; Jean-Yves "M. Frog" Labat – synthesizers; Kevin Ellman – drums, percussion; Mark "Moogy" Klingman – organ, backing vocals; Ralph Schuckett – keyboards, backing vocals; John Siegler – bass, cello, backing vocals	Todd Rundgren's Utopia (1974)
1975	Todd Rundgren – lead guitar, lead vocals; Mark "Moogy" Klingman – organ, backing vocals; Ralph Schuckett – keyboards, backing vocals; John Siegler – bass, backing vocals; Roger Powell – synthesizers, trumpet, backing and lead vocals; John "Willie" Wilcox – drums, percussion, backing and lead vocals	Another Live (1975)
1975–1976	Todd Rundgren – lead guitar & lead vocals; John Siegler – bass, backing vocals; Roger Powell – synthesizers, keyboards, trumpet, backing and lead vocals; John "Willie" Wilcox – drums, percussion, backing and lead vocals	Disco Jets (recorded 1976; released 2001)
1976–1982, 1982–1986	Todd Rundgren – lead guitar, lead and backing vocals; Roger Powell – synthesizers, keyboards, trumpet, rhythm guitar, backing and lead vocals; John "Willie" Wilcox – drums, percussion, backing and lead vocals; Kasim Sulton – bass, piano, lead and backing vocals	Ra (1977); Oops! Wrong Planet (1977); Adventures in Utopia (1979); Deface the Music (1980); Swing to the Right (1982); Utopia (1982); Oblivion (1984); POV (1985)
Summer 1982	Todd Rundgren – lead guitar, lead and backing vocals; Roger Powell – synthesizers, keyboards, backing and lead vocals; John "Willie" Wilcox – drums, percussion, backing and lead vocals; Doug Howard – bass, backing vocals	Utopia (1982) – two tracks
1986–1992	Disbanded
1992	Todd Rundgren – lead guitar, lead and backing vocals; Roger Powell – synthesizers, keyboards, backing and lead vocals; John "Willie" Wilcox – drums, percussion, backing and lead vocals; Kasim Sulton – bass, lead and backing vocals
2009	Surprise "reunion". Seven performances as the opening set for the A Wizard, a True Star Live shows: Todd Rundgren – lead guitar, lead and backing vocals; Roger Powell – synthesizers, keyboards, backing and lead vocals; Kasim Sulton – bass, lead and backing vocals; Prairie Prince – drums, percussion
2011	Todd Rundgren – lead guitar, lead and backing vocals; Kasim Sulton – backing vocals, organ (after Moogy's death); Ralph Schuckett – keyboards; Mark "Moogy" Klingman – organ, synthesizers; John Siegler – bass; Kevin Ellman – drums, percussion; Jesse Gress – backing vocals, rhythm guitar
2018	Todd Rundgren – lead guitar, lead and backing vocals; Kasim Sulton – bass, lead and backing vocals; Ralph Schuckett – synthesizers, keyboards (left before tour, January–March); John "Willie" Wilcox – drums, percussion, backing and lead vocals; Gil Assayas – synthesizers, keyboards (replaced Schuckett, March–July)

== Discography ==
Utopia discography
- Studio albums: 10
- Live albums: 4
- Compilation albums: 4
- Singles: 3

The discography of American progressive rock band Utopia includes ten studio albums, four live albums, four compilations, and three singles that charted on the U.S. Billboard Hot 100.

=== Studio albums ===
Year	Album information	Chart positions		
Year	Album information	US	CA	UK
1974	Todd Rundgren's Utopia: Released: September 1974; Label: Bearsville, Warner Bros. Records	34	28	–
1976 (Unreleased)	Disco Jets: Released: 2001 as part of the Todd Rundgren Demos and Lost Albums 2-CD set; Label: Crown	–	–	–
1977	Ra: Released: February 4, 1977; Label: Bearsville, Warner Bros.	79	–	27
1977	Oops! Wrong Planet: Released: September 1977; Label: Bearsville, Warner Bros.	73	66	59
1979	Adventures in Utopia: Released: December 27, 1979; Label: Bearsville, Warner Bros.	32	84	57
1980	Deface the Music: Released: September 24, 1980; Label: Bearsville, Warner Bros.	65	–	–
1982	Swing to the Right: Released: February 24, 1982; Label: Bearsville, Warner Bros.	102	–	–
1982	Utopia: Released: September 1982; Label: Network Records	84	–	–
1984	Oblivion: Released: January 1984; Label: Passport Records	74	94	–
1985	POV: Released: January 1985; Label: Passport	161	–	–

=== Live albums ===
- Another Live (Bearsville, Warner Bros., 1975) US No. 66
- Redux '92: Live in Japan (BMG, 1992)
- Official Bootleg, Vol. 9: Oblivion Tour (Nippon Crown, 2001)
- Bootleg Series, Vol. 2: KSAN 95FM, Live '79 (Sanctuary, 2002)
- Live at Hammersmith Odeon '75 (Shout! Factory, 2012)
- Live at the Chicago Theatre (Cleopatra, 2019)
- Live from Peekskill and New York City, Todd Rundgren's Utopia - Benefit for Moogy Klingman (Recorded January 29, 2011 at the Highline Ballroom, New York and November 18, 2011, at The Peekskill Performing Arts Center, Peekskill New York. Released by Purple Pyramid Records February 2020)

=== Compilation albums ===
- Trivia (Passport, 1986)
- The Collection (Castle, 1988)
- Anthology (1974-1985) 1989
- Oblivion, POV & Some Trivia (Rhino, 1996)
- City in My Head (Essential Records, 1999)
- Todd Rundgren vs Utopia (Castle Music, 2001)

=== Singles ===
Year	Title	Chart positions			Album
Year	Title	US Hot 100	US MSR	CAN	Album
1977	"Communion with the Sun"	–	–	–	Ra
1977	"Love Is the Answer"	–	–	–	Oops! Wrong Planet
1980	"Set Me Free"	27	–	55	Adventures in Utopia
1980	"The Very Last Time"	76	–	–	Adventures in Utopia
1980	"Second Nature"	–	–	–	Adventures in Utopia
1980	"I Just Want to Touch You"	–	–	–	Deface the Music
1982	"One World"	–	–	34	Swing to the Right
1982	"Lysistrata"	–	–	–	Swing to the Right
1982	"Hammer in My Heart"	–	31	–	Utopia
1983	"Feet Don't Fail Me Now"	82	–	–	Utopia
1984	"Crybaby"	–	30	–	Oblivion
1984	"Love with a Thinker"	–	–	–	Oblivion
1985	"Mated"	–	–	–	POV

== Music videos ==
- "Magic Dragon Theatre" (1977)
- "Set Me Free" (1980)
- "You Make Me Crazy" (1980)
- “Rock Love” (1980)
- "I Just Want to Touch You" (1980)
- "Feet Don't Fail Me Now" (1982)
- "Hammer in My Heart" (1982)
- "Crybaby" (1984)
