= Doug Howard (musician) =

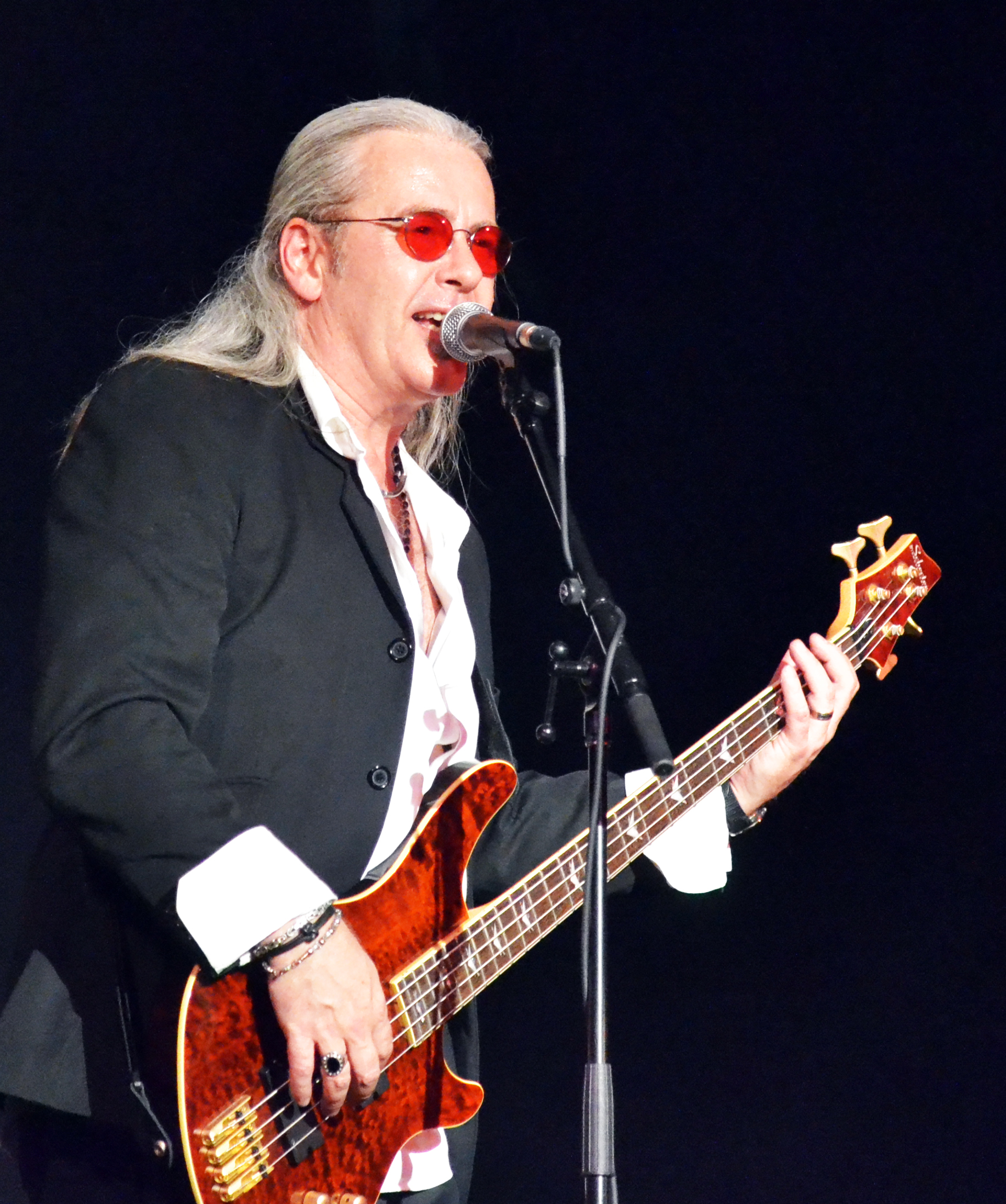
- Doug Howard with SpoonBread on 12 May 2012 in Oneonta, New York

Background information
- Also known as: M.D. Blessing, Joe E. Howard
- Born: Douglas Joseph Howard; May 2, 1956 (age 70); Englewood, New Jersey, United States
- Genres: Rock & roll, rhythm & blues
- Occupations: Musician, songwriter, arranger, music director, producer
- Instruments: Vocals, bass, keyboards
- Years active: 1977–present
- Website: www.doug-howard.com

Doug Howard (born May 2, 1956) is an American bassist, vocalist and songwriter. He is best known for his work as a performing/recording musician and occasional co-writer with groups, and artists such as Touch, Stun Leer, Todd Rundgren, Utopia and The Edgar Winter Group. He also played the role as the singing narrator "Songster" in the 1987 live production of the Masters of the Universe Power Tour based upon the Mattel He-Man series action figures. Howard is also the managing partner of Lodestar Entertainment, LLC, a music and video licensing, and publishing company based in New York. He is the paternal grandson of American songwriter Joseph E. Howard.

== Biography ==
Born in Englewood, New Jersey; he is the only child of actor Patience Jarvis and opera singer Joseph E. Howard, Jr. His stepsister by his mother's second marriage is Amanda Naughton, co-star of the AMC Network sitcom Remember WENN. He is the fifth generation of a family of entertainers, notably paternal grandson of songwriter Joseph E. Howard and maternal grandson of Broadway actor & director Robert C. "Bobby" Jarvis.

While attending Dwight Morrow High School in Englewood, Ernie Isley of the legendary funk and R&B group The Isley Brothers, though a guitarist himself, gave Howard his initial lesson on the fundamentals of the bass. Howard soon thereafter found himself playing in local and then regional cover bands on what was then referred to as the "New York/New Jersey circuit" of clubs and bars that he would otherwise not have been allowed into except as a paid performer due to his "underage" status. He also found his high school classes increasingly impossible to juggle against his performing schedule. He resigned from school in favor of playing full-time when he was offered the bass slot backing the Phil Spector girl group, The Crystals. Howard later resumed his studies at Berklee College of Music in Boston, where he studied under the jazz bassist, John Neves.

Howard was signed to his first recording contract with Atco Records by then label president Doug Morris, with the AOR/Metal band Touch in 1979. The debut self-titled release of the band produced two significant singles, "Call Me When The Spirit Moves You" and "Don't You Know What Love Is." One of the band's most notable performances was at the first Castle Donington Monsters of Rock Festival in Nottingham, England, where Howard accidentally swallowed a bee immediately after the band's performance opening for The Scorpions, Judas Priest and Ritchie Blackmore's Rainbow. Touch recorded their second album with Todd Rundgren as producer.

Upon the album's completion, Howard resigned from Touch and briefly replaced Kasim Sulton in Rundgren's band Utopia during Sulton's support tour for his then upcoming solo effort. During this time, Howard scored another hit in the US as co-writer of "Feet Don't Fail Me Now" with Rundgren. Upon Sulton's return, Howard joined The Edgar Winter Group, replacing the band's original bassist Dan Hartman. Along with drummer Rudy Richman of The Quireboys, Howard toured and recorded with Winter for many years, performing occasionally with Edgar's brother Johnny Winter and their Blue Sky Records label-mates Muddy Waters and Roy Buchanan.

In 1989, Howard was invited to join an album project titled Stun Leer as its lead vocalist which was being produced in Boston by Bob St. John and Anthony Resta. The album, despite various overtures from the US labels, was never picked up in the States and stayed on the shelf. A few years later, by virtue of a few leaks of the material, the album had become a file-sharing sensation in the UK, Europe, and Japan on the burgeoning Napster file sharing network. MTM Records of Germany tracked the band down and signed the project, but Stun Leer only performed a few shows in support of the release, as by that time the members had all moved onto other projects.

In 2000, as a follow-up to the Stun Leer album "Once" (and in that MTM was still owed a second album from the now dispersed band), Howard produced a solo effort for MTM entitled Last Man Standing, which he wrote, arranged, performed and produced for the most part by himself. Howard is also the founder and managing partner of Lodestar Entertainment, a music and video licensing and publishing company.

Howard's touring credits also contain his part as the singing narrator "Songster" for the international touring company of The Masters of the Universe Power Tour, wherein he gave 18 consecutive sold out performances at Radio City Music Hall in New York City, a house attendance record still standing today. Aside from his performing credits, he has worked as a session musician, singer and producer on various side projects, sound tracks and commercial jingles. Howard performs in a number of bands, most notably with blues/fusion guitarist Rhett Tyler and the all-star band SpoonBread, an evolving line-up of former members and backing musicians.

== Discography ==
- Touch - "Touch" Spring 1980 Atco - USA/Canada (co-writer, bass, vocals)
- Touch - "Touch" Summer 1980 Ariola - Europe
- Touch - "Touch" Summer 1980 Sony - Japan
- Monsters of Rock - "Live" Fall 1981 Polydor-Worldwide (co-writer, bass, vocals)
- The Look -"The Look" Winter 1981 Luminary - USA/UK (producer)
- Krayola- "Krayola" Summer 1982 Luminary - USA/UK (producer)
- Todd Rundgren's Utopia - "Utopia" Fall 1983 Network - Worldwide (co-writer)
- Oswald & The Herringbones - "OATH" Spring 1984 Buckeye - USA (producer)
- MD Blessing - "Cheri" Fall 1992 Silver City - USA/Canada (Doug Howard performing under a pseudonym, writer, lead vocals, guitar)
- Todd Rundgren's Utopia - "Utopia" Winter 1993 Rhino - Worldwide
- Joe E. Howard - "From This Moment On" Fall 1994 Lodestar - USA/Canada (Doug Howard performing under a pseudonym, lead vocals)
- Stun Leer - "Once" Spring 1998 MTM - UK/EU (co-writer, lead vocals)
- Stun Leer - "Once" Spring 1998 Pony Canyon- Japan
- Touch - "The Complete Works" Fall 1999 Frontier - UK/EU(co-writer, bass, vocals)
- Doug Howard - "Last Man Standing" Winter 2000 MTM - Worldwide (writer, producer, all instruments)
- Touch - "Fools Exit" Spring 2002 MTM - Worldwide (co-writer, bass, vocals)
- Reservoir Road - "Rollin & Tumblin" Spring 2010 Lodestar - US/Canada (bassist and producer)
- Rhett Tyler - "The Rhythm, The Power, The Blue" Spring 2013 Livingston Records (Orchard) - Worldwide (bass)
- SpoonBread - "Live at the Fireman's Ball" Fall 2013 Lodestar - USA/Canada/UK/EU (bass, lead vocals and producer)
- Touch - "Tomorrow Never Comes" Spring 2021 Deko Music (Warner Music Group) - USA/Canada (contributing writer, bass, vocals)
- Touch - "Tomorrow Never Comes" Spring 2021 Escape Music - UK/EU
- Touch - "Tomorrow Never Comes" Spring 2021 Rubicon Records - Japan
- Craig Brooks - "Desolation Freeway" Fall 2024 Escape Music - USA/Canada/UK/EU (bass, vocals)
