= Willie Wilcox =

American drummer (born 1951)

John "Willie" Wilcox (born September 21, 1951, in Trenton, New Jersey) is an American drummer, vocalist, producer, recording engineer, sound designer, composer, and senior audio director. He is best known for being a member of the band Utopia. He was also the senior audio director for Bally Technologies and Scientific Games in Las Vegas, Nevada from 2010 to 2020.

== Biography ==
Born in Trenton, New Jersey, in 1951, Willie was first inspired by his father, a trombone and bass player. Willie would watch his dad playing concerts in the park, and fondly remembers the feeling of going up on stage after the band's performance and watching all the musicians packing up their instruments.

He would go on to study drums and percussion as a teenager in Glens Falls, NY at Freddy's, a local drum store. He worked in the drum store cleaning and repairing drum kits, studying, and eventually teaching. Here, he attended drum clinics with Max Roach, Gene Krupa, Joe Morello, and Mel Taylor of the Ventures. Teo Macero, producer of many of the Miles Davis records, lived in Glens Falls and had an Italian restaurant there called “Maceros.” Teo would often invite many large bands to play in his restaurant, often as favors while on their way to Montreal from New York. Willie would sit in the front row as a 16-year-old kid watching Count Basie, Woody Herman, Duke Ellington, Max Roach, and Gene Krupa playing live. Willie would play as part of the intermission entertainment between the band's sets playing drums, along with Freddie Hubbard and John Coltrane records on a large stereo system behind the bar. At the restaurant, Willie got to meet with many members of the band, further cementing Willie's career path into the drumming world.

After Willie graduated high school, he won a scholarship to the Berklee College of Music, performing a percussion piece with a resident pianist and composer Dr. Maurice Whitney. They performed a piece by the French composer Darius Milhaud titled: “Concerto for percussion and small orchestra.” It featured timpani, marimba, suspended bass drum, triangles, ratchets, and multiple percussion instruments. This was a piece that was normally performed by college graduates as their final performance piece for graduation at schools like Juilliard and Manhattan School of Music.

Willie completed a year at the Berklee College of Music, and quickly transferred to the Manhattan School of Music in NYC. While in New York Willie studied drums with legendary jazz drum instructor Jim Blackley. While attending college, he played at the playboy club and the big band mountain circuit, playing live shows in the Catskills for the classic acts.

During his last year at the Manhattan School of Music, Willie auditioned for the Daryl Hall and John Oates band. They were preparing to tour their new record “Abandon Luncheonette” featuring the hit song “She’s Gone”. The audition went well, and he went on to tour extensively with Daryl and John, opening for artists like Lou Reed, The Bee Gees, and Dr. John. This would be the beginning of his rock music drumming career. The next landmark opportunity brought the recording of the record “War Babies” with Hall and Oates. This was Willie's first meeting with Todd Rundgren, who would become a lifelong musical collaboration with Willie in the band “Utopia.”

Willie took a gig with Bette Midler playing the show “Clams on The Half Shell”, and performed on Broadway for six months at the Minskoff Theatre. This was a big band performance and also starred vibes player “Lionel Hampton”, as well as bass player Gerald Jemott, Aretha Franklin's long-time bass player. Just after this six-month period, Willie was asked to join “Utopia” with Todd Rundgren. This collaboration would go on to last 25 years, recording some 25 records, and participating in multiple U.S. and world tours. During this time period, Willie also played drums on albums for Meat Loaf ”Bat Out of Hell,” Todd Rundgren solo records, Shaun Cassidy, and Steve Hillage. Other live and studio projects also included Mick Jagger and Ringo Starr.

Willie had a significant songwriting career composing and producing songs with artists like Luther Vandross, The Pointer Sisters, Natalie Cole, Kylie Minogue, Hall and Oates, Meat Loaf, Manny Pacquiao and scoring a #1 hit with dance artist Stacy Q, “We Connect.” He would continue his production and composing career at NBC Universal Television writing theme songs for shows like Jim Cramer's “Mad Money.” He spent the next 10 years as the senior audio director at Bally Technologies and Scientific Games, where he produced and remixed all the original tracks from Michael Jackson's hits for the Michael Jackson games in 5.1 surround sound.

== Equipment ==
Throughout his career with Utopia, Wilcox has been photographed playing multiple drumsets by companies such as Sonor, Yamaha Recording Series, Leedy, and Ludwig.

Wilcox's most memorable drum set was an electronic percussion configuration built on a motorcycle's frame. Its first incarnation, built in 1979, was simply known as the "Motorcycle" and consisted of Pearl Syncussion pads, a synthesized kick drum made from a Remo practice pad and a PAiA synthesizer, Zildjian acoustic cymbals mounted on the handlebars, and an acoustic snare drum in case the Syncussions went out. The unit also contained fog machines and working headlights, and was mounted on a spinning base. Offstage technicians controlled these elements during Wilcox's drum solo. Wilcox played the Motorcycle on the tour for Utopia's Adventures in Utopia album, including an appearance on The Mike Douglas Show. The original Motorcycle made its last appearance in the music video for the Utopia song "Crybaby" from the Oblivion album in 1984.

The second incarnation of the motorcycle drum set was known as the "Trapparatus". Built in 1985, and designed by Wilcox and Rick Downey (the then-drummer for Blue Öyster Cult), it consisted of Clavia ddrum electronic pads and sample modules, as well as Sabian acoustic cymbals. The ddrum modules contained samples of Wilcox's Sonor drums, as well as some samples of Simmons electronic sounds. The Trapparatus was played on the tour for Utopia's 1985 album POV. According to Utopia keyboardist Roger Powell, the Trapparatus was destroyed in 1986 when a warehouse containing most of Utopia's touring equipment was set ablaze by arsonists.

For the 2018 Utopia reunion, Wilcox announced that he was returning to the Ludwig Drum Company, and played a turquoise sparkle kit on the tour. This kit appears with the band on their July 2018 performance on the Jimmy Kimmel Show.

== Discography ==
- Daryl Hall and John Oates “War Babies” (1974 Atlantic Records)
- Todd Rundgren “Initiation” (1975 Bearsville Records)
- Todd Rundgren and Utopia “Live at The Hammersmith Odeon ’75” (1975 Shout Factory)
- Daryl Hall and John Oates “No Goodbyes” (1977 Atlantic Records)
- Dan Hartman “Images” (1976 Blue Sky Records)
- Steve Hillage “L” (1976, CBS Records)
- Utopia “Ra (1977, Bearsville Records)
- Utopia Oops! Wrong Planet” (1977)
- Meat Loaf “Bat Out of Hell “ (1977, Cleveland International Records)
- Todd Rundgren “Back To The Bars” (1978 Bearsville Records)
- Shaun Cassidy “Wasp” (1980, Warner Bros.)
- Candi and the Back Beat “Good Together” (1980 I.R.S. Records)
- Brian Briggs “Brian Damage” (1980, Bearsville Records)
- Utopia “Adventures in Utopia” (1980, Bearsville Records)
- Utopia “Deface the Music” (1980, Bearsville Records)
- Utopia “Swing to the Right “ (1982, Bearsville Records)
- David Lasley “Missing Twenty Grand” (Emi Records 1982)
- Utopia “Utopia “ (1982, Network Records)
- The Rubinoos “Party of Two” (1983, Berserkly Records)
- Todd Rundgren and Utopia ”One World” DVD (1983 Toei Video)
- Utopia “Oblivion” (1984, Passport Records)
- Utopia “POV” (1985, Passport Records)
- Stacey Q “We Connect” (single) (1986 Atlantic Records)
- Stacey Q “Better than Heaven” (LP) (1986 Atlantic Records)
- Utopia “Trivia” (1987, Gem Records)
- Gregory Hines “I’m Gonna Get To You” (1988 Epic Records)
- James Young “Out On A Day Pass” (1988 Full Blast Records)
- Rory Block “Turning Point” (1989 Zensor)
- Utopia “Anthology” (1989 Rhino Records)
- Utopia “Redux '92: Live in Japan” (1992 BMG)
- Utopia “Oblivion, POV & Some Trivia” (1996)
- Utopia “Official Bootleg Tokyo '79 “ (1999)
- Utopia Live in Boston: 1982 DVD Utopia (2004)
- Utopia “Live at The Waldorf” (2015 Esoteric Records)
- Utopia “Live At The Chicago Theatre” DVD (2018 Cleopatra Records)

== Personal life ==
Willie Wilcox is married to Elizabeth Wilcox.
