= Moogy Klingman =

- Born: September 7, 1950; Great Neck, New York, United States
- Died: November 15, 2011 (aged 61) New York City
- Genres: Rock
- Occupation(s): Musician, songwriter, record producer
- Instrument(s): Keyboards, piano, synthesizer
- Years active: 1966–2011
- Formerly of: Utopia, Bette Midler, Bo Diddley
- Website: MoogyMusic.com

Mark "Moogy" Klingman (September 7, 1950 – November 15, 2011) was an American musician and songwriter. He was a founding member of Todd Rundgren's band, Todd Rundgren's Utopia, and later became a solo recording artist, bandleader and songwriter. He released two solo recordings, and his songs have been covered by artists as wide-ranging as Johnny Winter, Carly Simon, James Cotton, Thelma Houston, Eric Clapton, Barry Manilow and Guns N' Roses. He played on stage with Jimi Hendrix, Chuck Berry, Luther Vandross, Lou Reed, Jeff Beck and Allan Woody & Warren Haynes of the Allman Brothers and Gov't Mule. Other than Rundgren, his longest musical association may have been with Bette Midler, for whom he served as band leader and who adopted for her signature song "(You Gotta Have) Friends", composed by Klingman and William "Buzzy" Linhart.

== Life and career ==
"Moogy" Klingman's nickname was not from the Moog synthesizer, pronounced "Mogue", but from his baby sister's pronunciation of "Marky" as "Moo-Gee." His nickname was already well established by the time that he did later play the instrument.

Klingman grew up in the Long Island suburb of Great Neck, New York. By age 10 he was collecting comic books and gramophone records, playing DJ in his basement. Through his older sister, he got an access pass to attend the 1965 Newport Folk Festival performance where Bob Dylan "went electric," meeting Dylan before and after the concert. Back home, his band The Living Few was signed to a demo deal by producer Dick Glass and recorded a demo of Dylan songs and original tunes.

At 16, he joined Jimmy James and the Blue Flames with Jimi Hendrix and Randy California. His jug band performance with schoolmate Andy Kaufman in a controversial civil rights concert resulted in his expulsion from high school in 1966, after which he went to Quintano's School for Young Professionals in New York City. By then, his band Glitterhouse had made records with the star producer Bob Crewe, as well as Crewe's soundtrack to the 1968 Roger Vadim film Barbarella with Jane Fonda.

Klingman's association with Todd Rundgren commenced in 1968 when they met outside the Cafe Au Go Go in Greenwich Village. In Klingman's Manhattan loft, he and Rundgren constructed the Secret Sound recording studio where Rundgren produced his A Wizard, A True Star, Todd, and other albums. Moogy was the original keyboardist for Todd Rundgren's Utopia, and Klingman's band Moogy & the Rhythm Kings (Kevin Ellman, Ralph Schuckett, John Seigler) formed the core of the original Utopia. He played on ten Todd Rundgren solo albums, as well as several Utopia albums.

When Lou Reed found himself in 1972 with an acclaimed album, Transformer, but no backing musicians to support it on tour, he tried hiring an inexperienced bar band called The Tots, but ultimately fired them mid-tour. With barely a week's notice, Klingman came up with a new five-member backing band, and completed the tour. The band consisted of Tom Cosgrove on lead guitar, Ralph Schuckett on rhythm guitar, "Buffalo" Bill Gelber on bass and "Chocolate" on drums.

Klingman played keyboards and produced Bette Midler's duet with Bob Dylan "Buckets of Rain" – which appeared on Midler's 1976 album, Songs for the New Depression. He became her musical director, taking over from Barry Manilow. Klingman collaborated with William "Buzzy" Linhart in co-writing "(You Gotta Have) Friends", which became Bette Midler's de facto theme song.

Klingman had solo albums out on Capitol and EMI records, as well as on his own label. Songs from his solo albums were covered by Johnny Winter, Eric Clapton, Barry Manilow, Bette Midler, Todd Rundgren and others. His song "Dust in the Wind" (not to be confused with the hit song of the same name by Kansas) was covered by Todd Rundgren on his album Something/Anything? and has been performed live in concert by Guns N' Roses.

In 1985 Klingman helped the group Mandolindley Road Show mix and master their debut self-titled album. He mentored the late, influential hip-hop producer Paul C., who was a member of the band.

Klingman became the executive producer and musical director of the Music From Free Creek "supersession" project when Rundgren's agent Albert Grossman wanted too much money on his behalf, and Rundgren passed the job on to his friend. The sessions featured the participation of Eric Clapton, Jeff Beck, Keith Emerson, Mitch Mitchell, Harvey Mandel and Linda Ronstadt.

Klingman also performed live at many venues with various groups, playing for Chuck Berry, Jimi Hendrix, Buzzy Linhart and then in the 1990s, with members of the Allman Brothers/Gov't Mule, and a summer tour with Bo Diddley. He was the co-founder of the band The Peaceniks, along with Barry Gruber. Klingman also played in the Moogy/Woody Band with Allman Brothers alumni Allan Woody, and Warren Haynes. In 1979 he had a show on Manhattan Cable Channel J called "Manhattan Alley". Klingman was also an actor and filmmaker. He directed a short film called, Boy With a Beatbox (1986), and starred in the 2005 independent feature film, The Rodnees: We Mod Like Dat!

A benefit concert was held in January 2011, to help pay Klingman's medical expenses, and saw the original Todd Rundgren's Utopia, featuring Ralph Schuckett, Kevin Ellman, John Siegler and Klingman, reunite on stage for the first time in over thirty years.

Klingman died of bladder cancer in New York City on November 15, 2011, at the age of 61.
