= Lake Hill, New York =

- Hamlet
- Location within New York Location within the United States
- Coordinates: 42°04′02″N 74°11′14″W
- Country: United States
- State: New York
- County: Ulster
- Elevation: 1,109 ft (338 m)
- Time zone: UTC-5 (Eastern (EST))
  - Summer (DST): UTC-4 (EDT)
- ZIP code: 12448
- Area code: 845
- GNIS feature ID: 954917

Lake Hill is a hamlet in the northwestern part of the town of Woodstock, Ulster County, New York, United States. The community is located along New York State Route 212 13.7 miles (22.0 km) northwest of Kingston. Lake Hill has a post office with ZIP code 12448, which opened on January 10, 1854.
