= Ralph Schuckett =

American keyboardist (1948–2021)

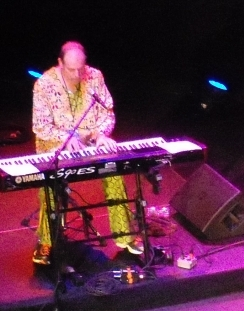
- Schuckett in 2011

Background information
- Born: March 2, 1948
- Origin: Los Angeles, California, U.S.
- Died: April 4, 2021 (aged 73)
- Genres: Rock, pop, soundtrack
- Occupations: Musician, composer, songwriter, record producer
- Instrument: Keyboards
- Formerly of: Utopia

Ralph Schuckett (March 2, 1948 – April 4, 2021) was an American keyboardist, composer and songwriter known as one of the founding members of Todd Rundgren's band Utopia. He composed for film and television, including Pokémon, Sonic X, and Another World, and has done session work and played live for many acts, most notably Carole King, appearing on her Writer, Tapestry and Music albums.

ASCAP honored "Another World" by John Loeffler and Schuckett as one of the most performed country songs of 1988.

While Schuckett was a staff producer at Columbia Records he signed and co-produced the debut album for Sophie B. Hawkins.

Schuckett died on April 4, 2021, at the age of 73.
