= Roger Powell (musician) =

American musician, programmer, and magazine columnist (born 1949)

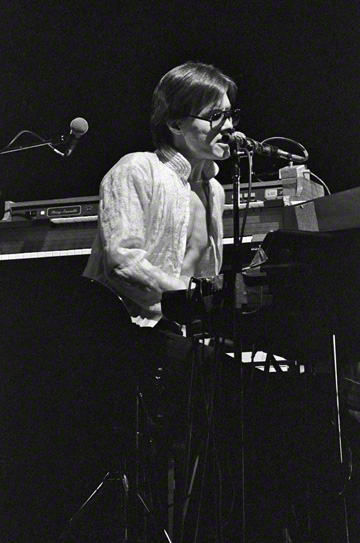
- Powell performing at a concert in Arcosanti with Utopia, 1978

Background information
- Born: Roger Powell; 14 March 1949 (age 77)
- Origin: Virginia, U.S.
- Genres: Rock; electronic
- Occupations: Musician, sound engineer, programmer
- Instruments: Vocals, keyboards, trumpet
- Years active: 1973–2018
- Labels: Atlantic Records Bearsville, Audion, Inner Knot, Unicorn Digital
- Formerly of: Utopia
- Website: Roger Powell official website

Roger Powell (born March 14, 1949) is an American musician, programmer, and magazine columnist best known for his membership with the rock band Utopia.

== Career ==
=== Musician ===
Powell's musical career started in the late 1960s, programming analog synthesizers for commercials. Powell was the protégé of Robert Moog (who created the Moog synthesizer), as well as Moog's competitor ARP, contributing designs and demonstrating systems.

Powell played keyboards and synthesizers with the rock band Utopia, led by Todd Rundgren and featuring players Kasim Sulton and Willie Wilcox, among others, from 1974 until its disbanding in 1985, playing, writing, and singing on ten of the band's eleven albums. For Utopia's live shows, Powell created the Powell Probe; the first remote, hand-held polyphonic synthesizer controller, which featured a custom-made shell used to access a complex stack of sequencers and other peripherals offstage, a device also used in a modified form by Jan Hammer.

His first solo album Cosmic Furnace was released in 1973. It was praised by Billboard magazine's reviewer as "...a fascinating, demanding LP that has all the hypnotic eeriness of the recent Miles Davis approach"; Village Voice critic Robert Christgau called it "the best pop electronicism since Terry Riley's A Rainbow in Curved Air."

Powell produced several additional solo albums, and was a touring musician with David Bowie and others.

In October 2006, after a long absence from music recording, he released Fossil Poets with musicians Gary Tanin and Greg Koch. The music is described as electronic / prog rock 'retro-futuristic'.

In March 2009, he released Blue Note Ridge with producer Gary Tanin. The music is described as solo piano improvisations. He occasionally performs with Bay Area folk musician and friend David Elias, plus other local, roots musicians. Informal live performances have been hosted and recorded at the San Gregorio General Store.

On September 7, 2009, Powell once again shared the stage with Rundgren as part of a re-constituted Utopia, with Tubes drummer Prairie Prince replacing Willie Wilcox. The band played an opening set for an album-length concert of Rundgren's A Wizard/A True Star. Powell was able to participate in the short tour after leaving Apple Computer, where he worked as a programmer, and before starting work at Electronic Arts.

In 2011, Powell made brief appearances on an album by Nashville artist Joe 'Guido Welsh' entitled Nothing Left To Say. He played two signature Minimoog solos on the recording which also featured former Utopia members John Siegler and Kevin Ellman.

=== Programmer ===
Powell developed one of the first personal computer MIDI sequencers, Texture. Originally written for the Apple II, Texture allowed the user to manipulate patterns of notes and store them on disk. Soon after the MIDI protocol was introduced, Texture was ported to the IBM PC and the Amiga and utilized the Roland MPU-401 MIDI interface. Its celebrity users included Stevie Wonder and Bob James. Much of Powell's computer work pre-dated MIDI. He gave the first performance on an all digital synthesizer while working with Hal Alles, Douglas Bayer, and Gregory Sims at Bell Laboratories. Powell's talents led eventually to positions with WaveFrame (an "audio mainframe" synthesizer used by Peter Gabriel), Silicon Graphics and Alias/Wavefront.

From 1997 to May 2009, he worked for Apple Computer as a senior programmer and technical lead for audio within Apple Professional Applications. He currently works at Electronic Arts as a Senior Producer on emerging music technologies.

=== Writer ===
Powell wrote a Keyboard magazine column on synthesizer technique for a number of years which were included in several books published by Hal Leonard - Synthesizer Basics, Synthesizer Technique and Synthesizers and Computers

== Solo discography ==
- Cosmic Furnace (Atlantic, 1973 — CD reissue on Wounded Bird, 2005)
- Air Pocket (Bearsville, 1980 — CD reissue w/bonus track on Wounded Bird, 2006)
- "Connections To The Outside World" Audion/Passport Records 1986 (Unreleased except for a small sampler that contained 4 songs)
- Fossil Poets (Inner Knot, 2006 Digipak CD)
- Fossil Poets (Inner Knot, 2007 Ltd. Ed. clear blue vinyl LP)
- Blue Note Ridge (Unicorn Digital, Fossil Poet Records, 2009 CD and digital download)
