= Todd Rundgren discography =

- Studio albums: 21
- Extended plays: 1
- Live albums: 12
- Compilation albums: 10
- Singles: 21
- Video albums: 2
- Music videos: 4

This article is a discography of American rock musician Todd Rundgren.

== Albums ==
=== Studio albums ===
| Year | Information | Chart positions | | | | | Certifications (sales thresholds) |
| Year | Information | US | AUS | CAN | JPN | UK | Certifications (sales thresholds) |
|---|---|---|---|---|---|---|---|
| 1970 | Runt: Released: September 1970; Labels: Ampex, Bearsville | 185 | – | – | 269 | – | |
| 1971 | Runt. The Ballad of Todd Rundgren: Released: May 1971; Labels: Ampex, Bearsville | 214 (Note: The Ballad of Todd Rundgren did not enter the Billboard 200, but peaked at number 214 on the Bubbling Under the Top LP's chart.) | – | – | – | – | |
| 1972 | Something/Anything?: Released: February 1972; Label: Bearsville | 29 | – | 34 | – | – | RIAA: Gold |
| 1973 | A Wizard, a True Star: Released: March 2, 1973; Label: Bearsville | 86 | – | – | – | – | |
| 1974 | Todd: Released: February 1974; Label: Bearsville | 54 | – | 33 | – | – | |
| 1975 | Initiation: Released: June 14, 1975; Label: Bearsville | 86 | – | – | – | – | |
| 1976 | Faithful: Released: April 1976; Label: Bearsville | 54 | – | – | – | – | |
| 1978 | Hermit of Mink Hollow: Released: April 7, 1978; Label: Bearsville | 36 | 11 | 27 | – | 42 | |
| 1981 | Healing: Released: January 28, 1981; Labels: Bearsville, Avatar, Island | 48 | – | – | – | – | |
| 1982 | The Ever Popular Tortured Artist Effect: Released: November 15, 1982; Labels: Bearsville, Festival | 66 | – | – | – | – | |
| 1985 | A Cappella: Released: September 1985; Labels: Warner Bros., Rhino | 128 | – | – | – | – | |
| 1989 | Nearly Human: Released: May 18, 1989; Label: Warner Bros. | 102 | – | 87 | 85 | – | |
| 1991 | 2nd Wind: Released: January 16, 1991; Label: Warner Bros. | 118 | – | – | 82 | – | |
| 1993 | No World Order: Released: July 6, 1993; Labels: Rhino, Forward, BMG | – | – | – | 96 | – | |
| 1995 | The Individualist: Released: October 31, 1995; Label: Digital Entertainment | – | – | – | – | – | |
| 1997 | Up Against It: Released: May 16, 1997; Label: Pony Canyon (Japan only) | N/R | – | N/R | – | N/R | |
| 1997 | With a Twist...: Released: September 23, 1997; Label: Guardian | – | – | – | – | – | |
| 2000 | One Long Year: Released: June 20, 2000; Labels: Artemis, Sheridan Square Entertainment, Epic | – | – | – | – | – | |
| 2004 | Liars: Released: April 6, 2004; Labels: Sanctuary, Earmark | – | – | – | – | 132 | |
| 2008 | Arena: Released: September 30, 2008; Labels: Hi Fi, Cooking Vinyl | – | – | – | – | – | |
| 2011 | Todd Rundgren's Johnson: Released: April 26, 2011; Label: MPCA | – | – | – | – | – | |
| 2011 | (re)Production: Released: September 13, 2011; Label: MRI | – | – | – | – | – | |
| 2013 | State: Released: April 9, 2013; Label: Esoteric Antenna | – | – | – | – | – | |
| 2015 | Global: Released: April 7, 2015; Label: Esoteric Antenna | – | – | – | 222 | – | |
| 2015 | Runddans: Released: May 4, 2015; Label: Smalltown Supersound | – | – | – | – | – | |
| 2017 | White Knight: Released: May 12, 2017; Label: Cleopatra | – | – | – | – | – | |
| 2022 | Space Force: Released: October 14, 2022; Label: Cleopatra | – | – | – | – | – | |

=== Live albums ===
| Year | Information | Chart positions | | |
| Year | Information | US | AUS | CAN |
|---|---|---|---|---|
| 1978 | Back to the Bars: Released: December 1978; Label: Bearsville | 75 | 99 | 64 |
| 1999 | Live in Chicago 91 (Todd Archive Series Vol.3): Released: 1991; Label: Panfish | – | – | – |
| 2002 | Live at the Forum (Bootleg Series Vol.1): Released: 1994; Label: Sanctuary | – | – | – |
| 2003 | Can't Stop Running: Released: July 28, 2003; Labels: Castle Music | – | – | – |
| 2006 | Liars Live: Released: 2005; Label: Castle Music | – | – | – |
| 2011 | Todd: Released: 2010; Label: Rock Beat | – | – | – |
| 2011 | Healing: Released: 2010; Label: Rock Beat | – | – | – |
| 2012 | Live at the Warfield – 10th March 1990 (Todd Archive Series): Released: 2012; Label: Esoteric | – | – | – |
| 2013 | Todd Rundgren's Johnson Live: Released: 2013; Label: Cherry Red | – | – | – |
| 2014 | At the BBC 1972-1982: Released: 2014; Label: Esoteric | – | – | – |
| 2016 | An Evening with Todd Rundgren: Live at the Ridgefield: Released: 2016; Label: Purple Pyramid | – | – | – |
| 2020 | A Wizard a True Star...Live! (rec. 2009): Released: 2020; Label: Purple Pyramid | – | – | – |

=== Compilation albums ===
- Anthology (1968–1985) (WEA, 1989)
- In Todd We Trust (SGC, 1989) (Nazz, Runt and Utopia)
- The Best of Todd Rundgren (Rhino, 1992)
- The Very Best of Todd Rundgren (Rhino, 1997)
- Free Soul (Victor, 14 July 1998) (Japanese release)
- The Best of Todd Rundgren "Go Ahead. Ignore Me." (Essential, 1999)
- The Essentials (Rhino, 2000)
- Best of – I Saw the Light (Essential, 2000)
- Somewhere/Anywhere? (Rhino/Bearsville, July 17, 2000) (Japanese release) 2 CDs (Previously unreleased demos/radio sessions and out-takes)
- Reconstructed (Anagram, April 9, 2001) (Remixes)
- The Definitive Rock Collection (Rhino, 2006)
- The Complete Bearsville Albums Collection (Bearsville, 2016) (13-CD Box Set)

== Extended plays ==
- Todd Rundgren's Short Johnson (Hi Fi, 23 March 2010)

== Singles ==
Below is a list of Todd Rundgren's singles that charted in the US, Australia, Canada or UK. For the sake of convenience, singles recorded by Rundgren as a member of Nazz, Runt and Utopia are listed here.

- For a full discography of Nazz, see Nazz.
- For a full discography of Utopia, see Utopia.

| Year | Title | Chart positions | | | | | | | Album |
| Year | Title | US BB | US CB | US MSR | US AC | AUS | CAN | UK | Album |
|---|---|---|---|---|---|---|---|---|---|
| 1968 | "Open My Eyes" ^{[A]} | 112 | – | – | – | – | – | – | Nazz |
| 1969 | "Hello It's Me" ^{[A]} | 66 | 47 | – | – | – | 41 | – | Nazz |
| 1969 | "Not Wrong Long" ^{[A]} | – | – | – | – | – | 90 | – | Nazz Nazz |
| 1970 | "We Gotta Get You a Woman" ^{[B]} | 20 | 21 | – | – | – | 20 | – | Runt |
| 1971 | "Be Nice to Me" ^{[B]} | 71 | 87 | – | – | – | 92 | – | Runt. The Ballad of Todd Rundgren |
| 1971 | "A Long Time, a Long Way to Go" ^{[B]} | 92 | – | – | – | – | – | – | Runt. The Ballad of Todd Rundgren |
| 1972 | "I Saw the Light" | 16 | 11 | – | 12 | 21 | 15 | 36 | Something/Anything? |
| 1972 | "Couldn't I Just Tell You" | 93 | – | – | – | – | – | – | Something/Anything? |
| 1973 | "Hello It's Me" | 5 | 2 | – | 17 | 68 | 17 | – | Something/Anything? |
| 1974 | "A Dream Goes on Forever" | 69 | 46 | – | – | – | 45 | – | Todd |
| 1974 | "Wolfman Jack" (featuring Wolfman Jack) | 105 | 94 | – | – | – | – | – | Something/Anything? |
| 1975 | "Real Man" | 83 | 84 | – | – | – | – | – | Initiation |
| 1976 | "Good Vibrations" | 34 | 47 | – | 32 | – | 28 | – | Faithful |
| 1978 | "Can We Still Be Friends" | 29 | 38 | – | 45 | 8 | 37 | – | Hermit of Mink Hollow |
| 1980 | "Set Me Free" ^{[C]} | 27 | 29 | – | – | – | 55 | – | Adventures in Utopia |
| 1980 | "The Very Last Time" ^{[C]} | 76 | 80 | – | – | – | – | – | Adventures in Utopia |
| 1981 | "Time Heals" | 107 | – | 18 | – | – | – | – | Healing |
| 1981 | "Compassion" | – | – | 48 | – | – | – | | Healing |
| 1982 | "One World" ^{[C]} | – | – | – | – | – | 34 | – | Swing to the Right |
| 1982 | "Hammer in My Heart" ^{[C]} | – | – | 31 | – | – | – | – | Utopia |
| 1983 | "Feet Don't Fail Me Now" ^{[C]} | 82 | – | – | – | – | – | – | Utopia |
| 1983 | "Bang the Drum All Day" | 63 | 73 | 29 | – | – | – | 86 | The Ever Popular Tortured Artist Effect |
| 1984 | "Crybaby" ^{[C]} | – | – | 30 | – | – | – | – | Oblivion |
| 1986 | "Loving You's a Dirty Job but Somebody's Gotta Do It" (Bonnie Tyler and Todd Rundgren) | – | 82 | – | – | – | – | 73 | Secret Dreams and Forbidden Fire |
| 1989 | "The Want of a Nail" | – | – | 15 | – | – | – | – | Nearly Human |
| 2020 | "Flappie" | – | – | - | – | – | – | – | |
"–" denotes releases that did not chart.

Notes

- A As a member of Nazz
- B As a member of Runt
- C As a member of Utopia

== Music videos ==
- "All the Children Sing" (1978)
- "Can We Still Be Friends" (1978)
- "Time Heals" (1981)
- "Hideaway" (1983)
- "Bang the Drum All Day" (1983)
- "Crybaby" (1984)
- "Something to Fall Back On" (1985)
- "The Want of a Nail" (1989)
- "Change Myself" (1991)
- "Property" (1993)

== Video ==
- The Desktop Collection and 2nd Wind Live Recording Sessions
- Live in Japan

== Production ==
- Great Speckled Bird (1969) - Great Speckled Bird
- The American Dream (1970) - The American Dream
- Stage Fright (1970) – The Band
- Straight Up (1971) – Badfinger
- Halfnelson (1971) - Sparks
- Moogy (1972) - Mark "Moogy" Klingman
- New York Dolls (1973) – New York Dolls
- We're an American Band (1973) – Grand Funk Railroad
- Mothers Pride (1973) – Fanny
- Shinin' On (1974) - Grand Funk Railroad
- War Babies (1974) – Hall & Oates
- Felix Cavaliere (1974) – Felix Cavaliere
- Bricks (1975) – Hello People
- L (1976) – Steve Hillage
- Bat Out of Hell (1977) – Meat Loaf
- Remote Control (1979) - The Tubes
- TRB Two (1979) - Tom Robinson Band
- Guitars and Women (1979) - Rick Derringer
- Wave (1979) - Patti Smith Group
- Wasp (1980) - Shaun Cassidy
- Walking Wild (1981) - New England
- Bad for Good (1981) - Jim Steinman
- That's What Friends Are For (1981) - The Moondogs
- Forever Now (1982) – The Psychedelic Furs
- Party of Two (1983) - Rubinoos
- Next Position Please (1983) - Cheap Trick
- Watch Dog (1983) - Jules Shear
- Zerra 1 (1984) - Zerra 1
- Love Bomb (1985) - The Tubes
- What Is This? (1985) - What Is This?
- Skylarking (1986) – XTC
- Dreams of Ordinary Men (1986) - Dragon
- Yoyo (1987) – Bourgeois Tagg
- Love Junk (1988) – The Pursuit of Happiness
- Karakuri House (1989) - Lä-Ppisch
- Disappearances Can Be Deceptive... (1989) - John Sloman
- Things Here Are Different (1990) – Jill Sobule
- Cue (1990) - Hiroshi Takano
- One Sided Story (1990) - The Pursuit of Happiness
- Awakening (1992) - Hiroshi Takano
- The World's Most Dangerous Party (1993) – Paul Shaffer
- Halfway Down the Sky (1999) – Splender
- The New America (2000) - Bad Religion
- Separation Anxieties (2000) - 12 Rods
- Cause I Sez So (2009) – New York Dolls

== Related ==
- An Elpee's Worth of Productions—tracks from albums Rundgren has produced
- Reconstructed—techno remixes of Rundgren and Utopia tracks by other artists
- Todd Rundgren and His Friends—various artists remake and remix Rundgren songs
