= Nazz III =

Studio album by Nazz
- Released: May 1971
- Recorded: Late 1968 – Early 1969
- Studio: I. D. Sound Studios, Hollywood
- Genre: Blues rock, pop, soul
- Length: 42:44
- Label: SGC
- Producer: Nazz

Nazz chronology
Nazz Nazz (1969)	Nazz III (1971)

Singles from Nazz III
- 1. "Some People" b/w "Magic Me" Released: June 1969

Positive version of cover

Professional ratings
Review scores
Source	Rating
allmusic	3/5 stars

Nazz III is the third and final studio album by the American pop rock band Nazz. It was released in 1971 on SGC Records, over a year after the band had broken up, and consists of archival recordings of the band.

== Background ==
Most of the tracks on the album were recorded in late 1968 and early 1969 for an intended double album, which was eventually pared down to a single album (Nazz Nazz). The exception is "Kicks", which was recorded for a compilation album that was cancelled. Drummer Thom Mooney, who retained possession of the master tapes, was contacted by SGC Records in 1970. When he refused to give over the tapes, saying he did not want the material released, SGC threatened legal action, since the tapes were the property of the label. He finally agreed to turn over the tapes under the condition he be allowed to oversee the mixing of the album.

The track "Loosen Up" was a take on the Archie Bell & the Drells song "Tighten Up". Mooney said the track was recorded as a spontaneous joke, with no intention that it ever be released. Rundgren, while corroborating Mooney's description of the song as spontaneous and throwaway, said that it would have gone on Nazz Nazz had the original double album plan come to fruition.

It has often been claimed that during the production process for Nazz III, lead vocalist Stewkey overdubbed his vocals on songs which originally featured Rundgren singing. However, the master tapes bear no evidence that this occurred. In 2006, Sanctuary Records released Nazz Nazz and Nazz III on a double CD that added several outtakes, including what it claims are the original versions of songs where Rundgren's vocals were removed, but these recordings are in fact Rundgren's demonstrations of the songs for the rest of the band, not recordings taken from the actual album sessions. Mooney and Stewkey have both asserted that while Stewkey did record new vocals for some of the songs, this was done to replace what SGC Records considered an inferior arrangement on tracks which already had Stewkey on lead vocals, and did not supplant anything Rundgren recorded. Moreover, Rundgren has stated that he only sang lead on songs which Stewkey refused to sing.

After Mooney finished mixing the album and determining the sequence of tracks, he turned the completed recordings over to SGC Records but advised them not to release them, saying that they had not been conceived as a coherent album and included tracks which the Nazz had recorded just as a joke. The label released Nazz III following the release of guitarist Todd Rundgren's second solo album, Runt. The Ballad of Todd Rundgren.

== Track listing ==
All songs written by Todd Rundgren except where noted.

=== Side one ===
1. "Some People" – 3:38
2. "Only One Winner" – 3:02
3. "Kicks" (Barry Mann, Cynthia Weil) – 3:47
4. "Resolution" – 2:44
5. "It's Not That Easy" – 2:36
6. "Old Time Lovemaking" – 2:29
7. "Magic Me" – 3:04

=== Side two ===
8. "Loosen Up" (Robert Antoni, Thom Mooney, Rundgren, Carson Van Osten) – 1:24
9. "Take the Hand" – 2:15
10. "How Can You Call That Beautiful" – 3:39
11. "Plenty of Lovin'" (Van Osten)– 3:43
12. "Christopher Columbus" (Van Osten) – 3:20
13. "You Are My Window" – 6:00

== Personnel ==
=== Nazz ===
- Todd Rundgren – electric guitar, backing vocals, lead vocals on "You Are My Window"
- Robert "Stewkey" Antoni – keyboards, backing vocals, lead vocals except on “You Are My Window”
- Carson Van Osten – bass guitar, backing vocals
- Thom Mooney – drums

=== Technical ===
- Nazz – producers, arrangers
- James Lowe – engineer
- Loring Eutemey – design
- Joel Brodsky – photography
