= Todd Rundgren =

American musician (born 1948)

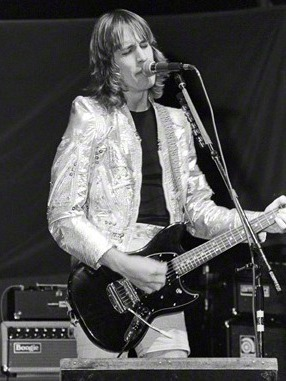
- Rundgren performing with Utopia in 1978

Background information
- Born: Todd Harry Rundgren; June 22, 1948 (age 78); Upper Darby, Pennsylvania, U.S.
- Genres: Rock; pop; progressive; electronic; R&B; psychedelia; soft rock
- Occupations: Musician; singer; songwriter; record producer; sound engineer; video producer; multimedia artist
- Instruments: Vocals; guitar; bass; keyboards; drums
- Works: Discography
- Years active: 1966–present
- Labels: Ampex; Bearsville; Warner Bros.; Cleopatra
- Formerly of: Nazz; The New Cars; Runt; Ringo Starr & His All-Starr Band; Utopia; Woody's Truck Stop
- Children: 3 biological & 2 adoptive, incl. Liv Tyler

Todd Harry Rundgren (born June 22, 1948) is an American musician, singer, songwriter, and record producer who has performed a diverse range of styles as a solo artist and as a member of the bands Nazz and Utopia. He is known for his sophisticated and often unorthodox music, his occasionally lavish stage shows, and his later experiments with interactive art. He also produced music videos and was an early adopter and promoter of various computer technologies, such as using the Internet as a means of music distribution in the late 1990s.

A native of Upper Darby, Pennsylvania, Rundgren began his professional career in the mid-1960s, forming the psychedelic band Nazz in 1967. After two years, he left Nazz to pursue a solo career and immediately scored his first US top 40 hit with "We Gotta Get You a Woman" (1970). His best-known songs include "Hello It's Me" and "I Saw the Light" from Something/Anything? (1972), which get frequent air time on classic rock radio stations, the 1978 "Can We Still Be Friends", and the 1983 single "Bang the Drum All Day", which is featured in many sports arenas, commercials, and movie trailers. Although lesser known, "Couldn't I Just Tell You" (1972) was influential to many artists in the power pop genre. His 1973 album A Wizard, a True Star remains an influence on later generations of bedroom musicians.

Rundgren is considered a pioneer in the fields of electronic music, progressive rock, music videos, computer software, and Internet music delivery. He organized the first interactive television concert in 1978, designed the first color graphics tablet in 1980, and created the first interactive album, No World Order, in 1993. Additionally, he was one of the first acts to be prominent as both an artist and producer. His notable production credits include Badfinger's Straight Up (1971), Grand Funk Railroad's We're an American Band (1973), the New York Dolls' New York Dolls (1973), Meat Loaf's Bat Out of Hell (1977), and XTC's Skylarking (1986). He was inducted into the Rock and Roll Hall of Fame in 2021.

== Early influences and Nazz ==
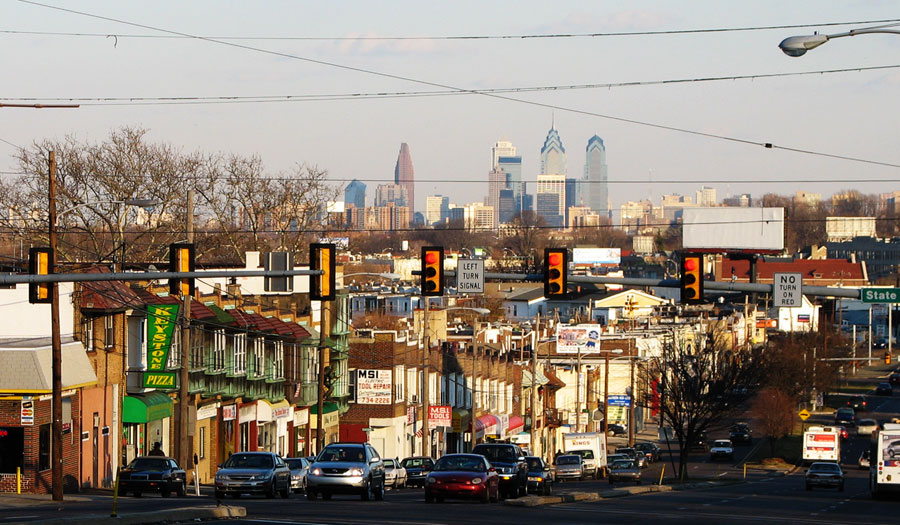
Rundgren's hometown, Upper Darby Township, Pennsylvania, in 2007

Todd Harry Rundgren was born in Philadelphia on June 22, 1948, the son of Ruth (née Fleck; April 29, 1922 – April 6, 2016) and Harry W. Rundgren (1917–1996). His father was of Swedish descent and his mother was of Austrian and German descent. He grew up in the bordering town of Upper Darby Township, Pennsylvania and taught himself how to play guitar with little help. As a child, Rundgren was fascinated by his parents' small record collection, which consisted of show tunes and symphonic pieces, and especially by the operettas of Gilbert and Sullivan. Later, he grew infatuated with the music of the Beatles, the Rolling Stones, the Ventures, and the Yardbirds, as well as the Philadelphia soul of Gamble & Huff, the Delfonics, and the O'Jays. At the age of 17, he formed his first band, Money, with then-best friend and roommate Randy Reed and Reed's younger brother.

After graduating from Upper Darby High School in 1966, Rundgren moved to Philadelphia and began his career in Woody's Truck Stop, a blues rock group in the style of Paul Butterfield Blues Band. Rundgren stayed with the band for eight months, and in the process, they became the most popular group in Philadelphia. He and bassist Carson Van Osten left before they released the eponymous first album to form the rock band Nazz in 1967. By then, Rundgren had lost interest in the blues and wanted to pursue a recording career with original songs in the style of newer records by the Beatles and the Who. As a member of the Nazz, he learned his craft as a songwriter and vocal arranger, and was determined to equal the artistry of the Beatles. (Note: He said he was not enamored with the Beatles after Sgt. Pepper's Lonely Hearts Club Band (1967) and thought they lost their "momentum".)

"Open My Eyes" (1967)
Excerpt from the debut record by Nazz

In 1968, after recording four demo discs, the Nazz were signed by Atlantic Records subsidiary Screen Gems Columbia (SGC). They were flown to Los Angeles to produce their first album at ID Sound studio. Rundgren had no prior production experience and remembered that the producer, Bill Traut, "just whipped through the mixes in a day or two ... So I got it into my head, 'Well, he's gone now, so why don't we just mix it again, more like the way we want it?' Our engineer didn't mind if we went and just started diddling around on the board ... It was pretty much trial and error." He took an experimental approach to the recordings, employing techniques such as varispeed and flanging, and despite having no formal training, scored music charts for string and horn arrangements. Engineer James Lowe, whom Rundgren recruited for his involvement with arranger Van Dyke Parks, believed that Rundgren had become the de facto leader of Nazz, and that a producer's credit was wrongfully withheld from him.

Nazz gained minor recognition with their debut single, July 1968's "Open My Eyes" backed with "Hello It's Me", both songs penned by Rundgren. They subsequently released three albums: Nazz (October 1968), Nazz Nazz (April 1969), and Nazz III (1971). In March 1968, New York singer-songwriter Laura Nyro released her second album, Eli and the Thirteenth Confession. When Rundgren heard the record, he was struck by "all the major seventh chords and variations on augmented and suspended chords", and it had an immediate impact on his songwriting, especially as he began to compose more on piano. He elaborated:

I know for a fact that her influences were the more sophisticated side of R&B, like Jerry Ragovoy and Mann & Weil and Carole King. ... and she also had her own very original and very jazz-influenced way of seeing things. It was that extra layer that made her influential. A lot of those chords she got from other people. But beyond the elements of her composition, I always thought it was the way she played her own material that really sold it. ... I met her right after Eli and the Thirteenth Confession. I actually had arranged a meeting, just because I was so infatuated with her and I wanted to meet the person who had produced all this music. ... after I met her the first time, she asked me if I wanted to be her band leader. But the Nazz had just signed a record contract and I couldn't skip out on the band, even though it was incredibly tempting.

The rest of the band struggled to accommodate his changing tastes, and tensions between all the band members had begun to build up in the interval between recording their first and second albums as a result of their shared living quarters. Tensions further increased during the recording of Nazz's second album, as the other members bridled at the formerly unassuming Rundgren asserting complete control of the sessions as the producer. By the time Nazz Nazz was released, Rundgren and Van Osten had both left the Nazz, so the track selection was done without any input from them. Nazz III, which included leftover tracks from the Nazz Nazz sessions, was likewise released without Rundgren's involvement.

== Production beginnings ==
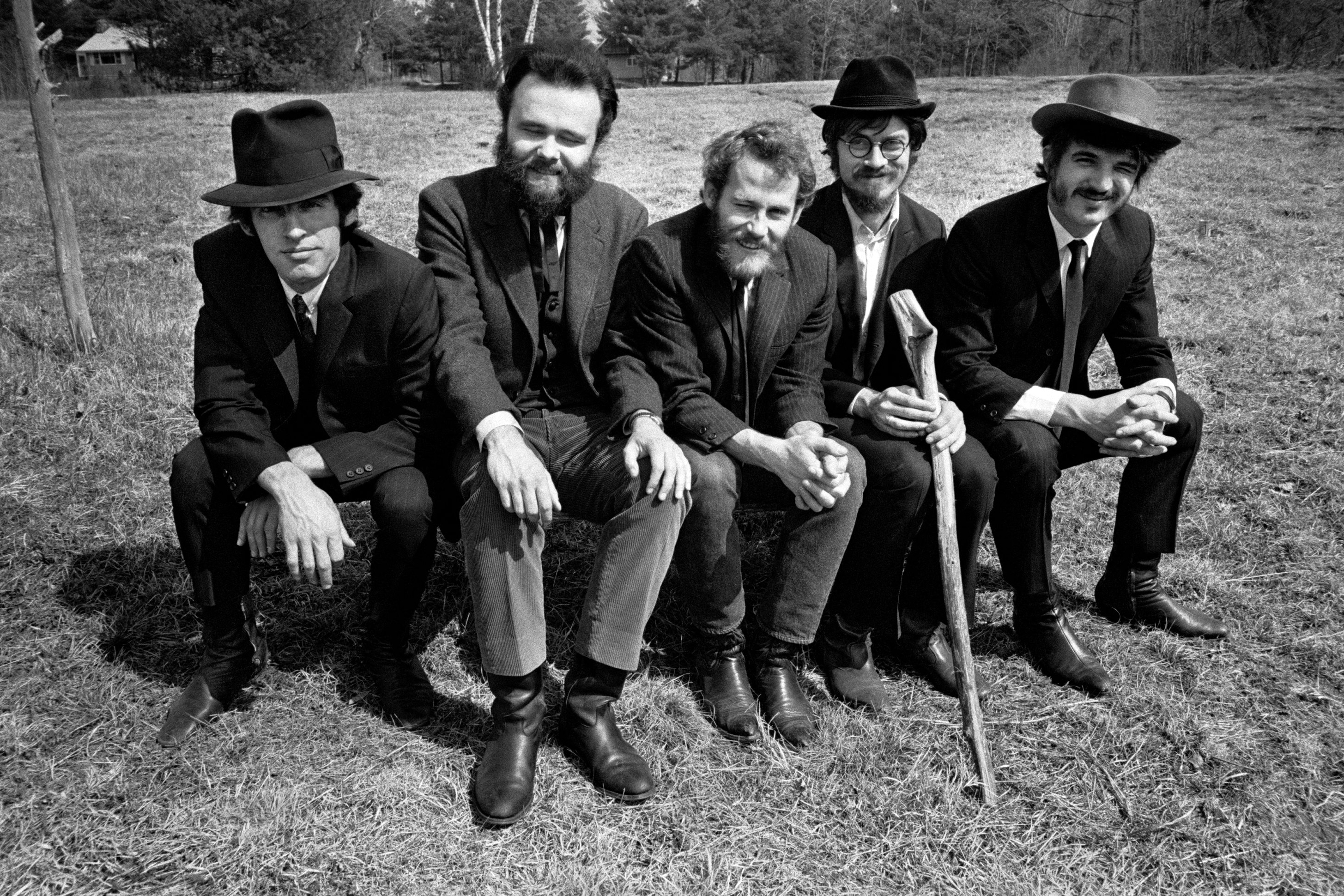
One of Rundgren's first gigs as a producer was engineering and mixing for the Band (pictured in 1969).

After departing Nazz, the 21-year-old Rundgren briefly considered working as a computer programmer, and then decided that his calling was as a producer. He moved to New York in the summer of 1969 and involved himself with the clubs of Greenwich Village, particularly Steve Paul's Scene, and met a number of Manhattan musicians and fashion designers. Michael Friedman, formerly the assistant of Nazz manager John Kurland, offered Rundgren a job as staff engineer and producer under Albert Grossman, which Rundgren accepted. Grossman, known for his management of folk rock acts, had just founded Ampex Records, a joint business venture with the tape company of the same name, and built Bearsville Studios, near Woodstock. Bearsville soon became its own record imprint. Grossman promised to Rundgren that he would become the "highest-paid producer in the world", which later came true.

Rundgren said he was initially relegated to "various old folk artists that they had who needed an upgrade: people like Ian & Sylvia, James Cotton, and other artists in Albert's stable." Shortly after producing the eponymous 1969 album by Great Speckled Bird, he was promoted as Bearsville's house engineer. Accompanied by Robbie Robertson and Levon Helm of the Band, he traveled to Canada to record Jesse Winchester's eponymous 1970 debut album. Immediately afterward, he said, "the Band asked me to engineer their Stage Fright sessions. I think Jesse Winchester was a kind of run-through for that, because I was pretty quick to get the sounds and they liked that." Released in August 1970, Stage Fright reached number 5 on the Billboard 200, the highest chart showing the Band had to that point. Rundgren was dubbed Bearsville's "boy wonder".

His work for the Band was followed by a second album for Winchester (which was then shelved for two years) and the album Taking Care of Business by the James Cotton Blues Band (1970). This project resulted in Rundgren meeting Cotton's keyboard player Mark "Moogy" Klingman, who in turn introduced Rundgren to keyboard player Ralph Schuckett, both of whom worked extensively with Rundgren over the next few years. Rundgren was to produce Janis Joplin's third and ultimately final album, Pearl (1971), but plans fell through, as the two artists could not get along with each other.

== Solo career ==
=== 1970–1984: Bearsville era ===
==== Runt and Ballad of Todd Rundgren ====
Following a period where he thought he would never return to being a performing artist, Rundgren approached Grossman with the idea of what would become his debut solo record, Runt. Although his general attitude for any project was to "make the record [I] wanted to make and then hope the label can find a way to promote it", Rundgren ensured that any loss to Grossman would be minimal: "I didn't get an actual advance for Runt. I just asked for a recording budget to pay the studio costs. ... I had no idea how much money I even had in the bank. If I needed cash, I would show up at the accountants and they would just give me hundreds or thousands of dollars."

Released in mid-1970, Runt was not originally credited to Rundgren due to his anxieties about starting a full-fledged solo career, and instead bore the moniker "Runt". The album featured a bright sound and songs inspired by Laura Nyro. It was recorded with the 19-year-old bassist Tony Fox Sales and his 16-year-old brother Hunt Sales on drums. Nazz engineer James Lowe returned for the sessions and recalled that Rundgren seemed "more able to really lead a group. If you go back and listen to it, it's very sophisticated material, especially for a guy so young." Lead single "We Gotta Get You a Woman" reached number 20 on the Billboard charts. As he prepared a follow-up LP, he produced Halfnelson, the debut album by the band that would later become Sparks. Members Ron and Russell Mael later credited Rundgren with launching Sparks' career.

Rundgren's industry reputation grew substantially as a result of his success with Runt, and for the first time in his life, he began using recreational drugs. Initially this was limited to marijuana. He said that the drug gave him "a whole different sensibility about time and space and order" that influenced the writing for his second album, Runt. The Ballad of Todd Rundgren. The material was mostly piano ballads and still largely based on Nyro's template, but a more conscious effort by Rundgren was made to refine his music and choice of subject matter, and to distinguish himself from his influences. Released May 1971, The Ballad of Todd Rundgren bore two singles, "Be Nice to Me" and "A Long Time, a Long Way to Go", neither of which repeated the success of "We Gotta Get You a Woman". While initial reviews of Ballad were mixed, it came to be regarded as one of the greatest singer-songwriter albums of the era.

==== Something/Anything? ====
In late 1971, Rundgren was recruited to finish Badfinger's third album Straight Up, a project George Harrison had abandoned to organize the Concert for Bangladesh, in London. The album was a hit and its two singles were similarly successful, although Rundgren was not credited for the first ("Day After Day") and thus did not receive production royalties for that single. Rundgren said that the song "didn't sound much like what [Harrison had] done" and speculated that the credit to Harrison "may or may not have been something purposeful, just some by-product of a general Beatle hubris". (Note: Plans for Rundgren to produce their fourth album fell through after tracking a few songs in January 1972.) The Straight Up sessions lasted two weeks in September, after which Rundgren returned to Los Angeles to work on his third solo album, originally planned as a single LP.

As with Ballad, much of the newer material was written or conceived under the influence of marijuana. However, by this time, he had also begun experimenting with Ritalin. He recalled, "my songwriting process had become almost too second-nature. I was writing songs formulaically, almost without thinking, knocking [them out], reflexively, in about 20 minutes." The use of Ritalin also helped him focus on the process as he worked up to 12 hours a day to beat the three-week deadline. To keep up the pace, he installed an eight-track recorder, mixer, and synthesizers into his living room so that he could continue recording after leaving the studio. For the first time in his career, Rundgren recorded every part by himself, including bass, drums, and vocals. About "an album and a half" was completed this way. He then decided to stretch the project into a double LP and quickly recorded the last few tracks with musicians, live in the studio.

"I Saw the Light" (1972)
Lead single "I Saw the Light" became one of Rundgren's best-known songs.

Something/Anything?, the first album officially issued under the name "Todd Rundgren", was released in February 1972, shortly after Bearsville had signed a long-term distribution deal with Warner Bros. Records. The album included many songs that would become his best-known. Included among straightforward pop songs are extended jams and studio banter, such as the spoken-word track "Intro", in which he teaches the listener about recording flaws for an egg hunt-type game he calls "Sounds of the Studio". Magazine ads depicted a smiling Rundgren daring the reader to "ignore me". The album peaked at number 29 on the Billboard 200 and was certified gold in three years. Lead single "I Saw the Light" peaked at number 16 on the Billboard Hot 100. "Hello It's Me", which followed late in 1973, reached number 5.

According to music critic Colin Larkin, Something/Anything? has since been "rightly regarded as one of the landmark releases of the early 70s". "Couldn't I Just Tell You" was influential to artists in the power pop genre. Music journalist Paul Lester called the recording a "masterclass in compression" and said that Rundgren "staked his claim to powerpop immortality [and] set the whole ball rolling". Musician Scott Miller's 2010 book Music: What Happened? calls the song "likely the greatest power pop recording ever made", with lyrics "somehow both desperate and lighthearted at the same time", and a guitar solo having "truly amazing dexterity and inflection". In 2003, Something/Anything? was ranked number 173 on Rolling Stone magazine's list of the "500 Greatest Albums of All Time".

==== A Wizard, a True Star, Todd, and Utopia ====
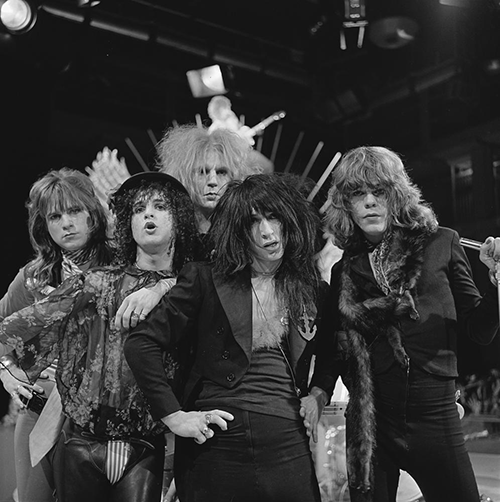
New York Dolls, whose 1973 debut album was produced by Rundgren

Subsequent albums, beginning with A Wizard, a True Star and the spin-off group Utopia, saw a dramatic shift away from straightforward three-minute pop. After the success of Something/Anything?, Rundgren felt uncomfortable that he was being increasingly tagged as "the male Carole King". "With all due respect to Carole King," he said, "It wasn't what I was hoping to create as a musical legacy for myself." Now relocated back to New York and experimenting with a host of psychedelic drugs, he began to think that the writing on Something/Anything? was largely formulaic and borne from laziness, and sought to create a "more eclectic and more experimental" follow-up album. (Note: He recalled taking mescaline, psilocybin, and mushrooms, and was not aware if he took LSD.) His music tastes also started to lean toward the progressive rock of Frank Zappa, Yes, and the Mahavishnu Orchestra. In 2017, while giving a commencement speech at the Berklee College of Music, he described the record as:

... my act of tyranny after having achieved commercial success. ... I threw out all the rules of record making and decided I would try to imprint the chaos in my head onto a record without trying to clean it up for everyone else's benefit. The result was a complete loss of about half of my audience at that point. ... This became the model for my life after that.

The sound and structure of Wizard was heavily informed by Rundgren's hallucinogenic experiences. It was envisioned as a hallucinogenic-inspired "flight plan" with all the tracks segueing seamlessly into each other, starting with a "chaotic" mood and ending with a medley of his favorite soul songs. He said: "With drugs I could suddenly abstract my thought processes in a certain way, and I wanted to see if I could put them on a record. A lot of people recognized it as the dynamics of a psychedelic trip—it was almost like painting with your head." Rundgren and Moogy Klingman established a professional recording studio, Secret Sound, to accommodate the Wizard sessions. The studio was designed to Rundgren's specifications and was created so that he could freely indulge in sound experimentation without having to worry about hourly studio costs, although he maintained that the album still felt "kind of rushed through because the studio wasn't finished". Some of the other influences on the album included musical theater, jazz, and funk.

A Wizard, a True Star was released in March 1973. At Rundgren's behest, no singles were issued from the album, as he wanted the tracks to be heard in the context of the LP. Its release coincided with the success of the "Hello It's Me" single, which gave Rundgren a reputation as a ballad singer, in marked contrast to the content on Wizard. Although critical reception to the album was mixed, Wizard became highly influential to musicians in the ensuing decades. In 2003, music journalist Barney Hoskyns called the record "the greatest album of all time ... a dizzying, intoxicating rollercoaster ride of emotions and genre mutations [that] still sounds more bravely futuristic than any ostensibly cutting-edge electro-pop being made in the 21st Century." In 2018, Pitchfork's Sam Sodomsky wrote that the "fingerprints" of Wizard remained "evident on bedroom auteurs to this day".

In the weeks following the album's release, Rundgren produced Grand Funk Railroad's We're an American Band and the New York Dolls' self-titled debut album, which were among the most significant LPs of the year. The former album reached number two on the US charts, while the latter became a seminal forerunner of punk rock, although Rundgren never became known as a "punk producer". Rundgren also prepared a technologically ambitious stage show with a band later to be known as Utopia Mark I, consisting of bassist Tony Sales, drummer Hunt Sales, keyboardist Dave Mason, and synthesizer specialist Jean-Yves "M. Frog" Labat. The tour began in April and was cancelled after only a couple weeks on the road.

Once Rundgren was finished with his production duties, he began formulating plans for an improved configuration of Utopia, but first returned to Secret Sound to record the more synthesizer-heavy double album Todd, which was more material drawing on his hallucinogenic experiences. This time, he had also formed a fascination with religion and spirituality, reading books by authors such as Madame Blavatsky, Rudolf Steiner, and Jiddu Krishnamurti. Originally scheduled for release in December 1973, Todd was delayed to the next February due to a vinyl shortage caused by the 1973 oil crisis.

During the making of Todd, Rundgren took note of the "fusion jazz sensibility" between session musicians Kevin Ellman (drums) and John Siegler (bass). Rundgren chose them, along with Klingman and keyboardist Ralph Shuckett, to be the new configuration of Utopia. This line-up performed their first show at Central Park on August 25, 1973, sharing the bill with the Brecker Brothers and Hall & Oates. (Note: The main purpose of this show was to record the Todd track "Sons of 1984" live.) Utopia played more shows throughout November and December, performing material from Something/Anything? and Wizard after a solo opening set by Rundgren on piano playing along to a pre-recorded track. On December 7, Rundgren appeared by himself on The Midnight Special performing "Hello It's Me" while dressed in jarringly flamboyant glam attire to the chagrin of some of his bandmates and Bearsville executive Paul Fishkin, who recalled that Rundgren looked "like a fucking drag queen".

If I get that one minute of total illumination then I don't care if my whole career goes down the drain. I'd know there was an answer to everything—to existence, to death.

— Todd Rundgren, September 1974

Utopia embarked on their first successful tour between March and April 1974, after which Rundgren produced Hello People's The Handsome Devils and Hall & Oates' War Babies. The band's debut record came in the form of the LP titled Todd Rundgren's Utopia (November 1974). It marked Rundgren's first full-fledged venture into the progressive rock genre. Utopia released several more albums between 1975 and 1985. Although they gradually rebranded toward a rock-pop sound, Todd Rundgren's Utopia remained their highest album chart showing at number 34. Keyboardist Roger Powell recalled that Bearsville wished Utopia would have "just gone away", however, "Todd's contract called for a certain number of albums over a certain number of years, so he decided that every other album would be a solo album and the next one a Utopia album."

==== Initiation, Faithful, and Hermit of Mink Hollow ====
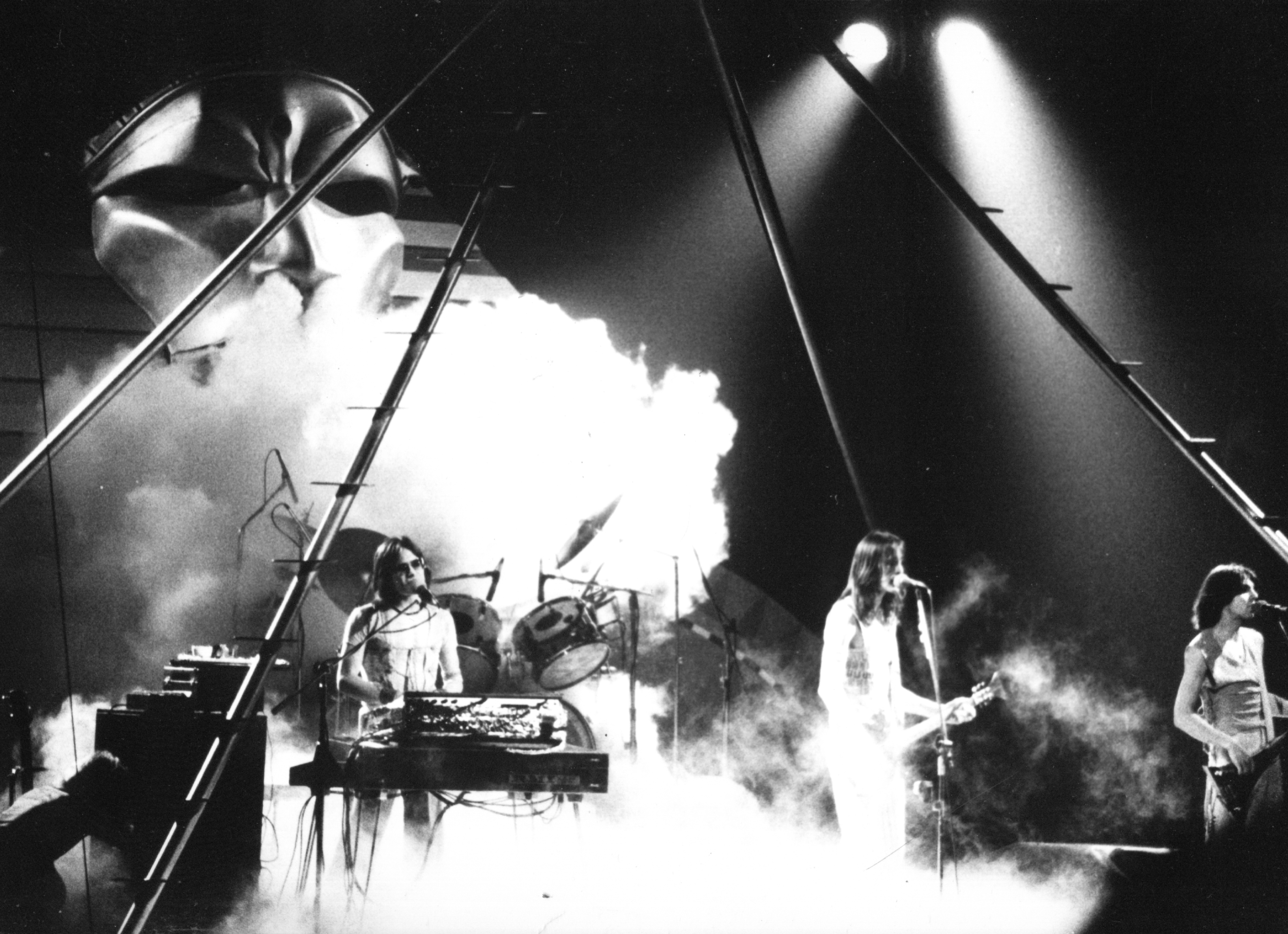
Utopia on their Ra tour at the Fox Theatre in Atlanta in 1977. Rundgren is pictured on second-right.

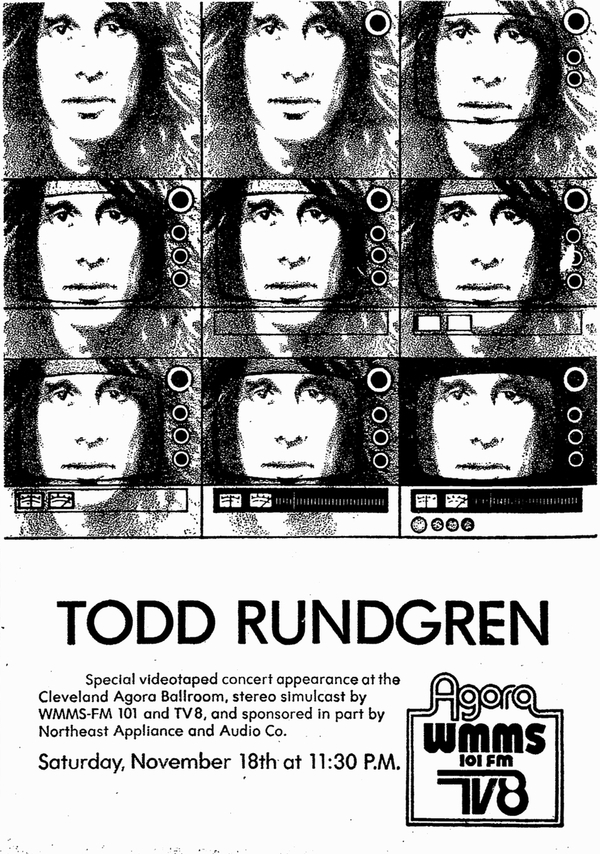
1978 print ad for Rundgren's simulcast concert at the Agora Ballroom in Cleveland

A Wizard, a True Star included "Rock N Roll Pussy", a song aimed at former Beatle John Lennon. In 1974, Rundgren and Lennon were embroiled in a minor feud over comments Rundgren made in the February edition of Melody Maker magazine. In the article, he accused Lennon of striking a waitress at the Troubadour in Hollywood and called him a "fucking idiot" proselytizing revolution and "acting like an ass". In September, the magazine published Lennon's response, in which he denied the charges and referred to the musician as "Turd Runtgreen": "I have never claimed to be a revolutionary. But I am allowed to sing about anything I want! Right?" Later, Rundgren said, "John and I realized we were being used and I got a phone call from him one day and we just said: 'Let's drop this now.'"

Initiation (1975) showed more experimentation with synthesizers, and displayed the musical influence of the avant-garde jazz fusion of contemporary acts such as the Mahavishnu Orchestra and Frank Zappa. Once again the original LP issue saw Rundgren pushing the medium to its physical limits, with the side-long suite "A Treatise on Cosmic Fire" clocking in at over 35 minutes.

Released in May 1976, Faithful saw Rundgren celebrating his tenth year as a professional musician. The album featured one side of original songs and one side of covers of significant songs from 1966, including the Yardbirds' "Happenings Ten Years Time Ago", the Beach Boys' "Good Vibrations", and two Lennon-penned Beatles songs. The arrangements of the covers were intended to sound as close to the originals as possible, and Rundgren's original songs were written as a reflection of his 1960s influences. He cited the song "The Verb 'To Love'" as the point in which he made the conscious decision to stop writing superficial love songs and "seek out all other kinds of subject matter to write about". Despite the lack of sales and promotion for Faithful, lead single "Good Vibrations" received regular airplay on American radio.

Following the completion of Faithful, Rundgren spent two months on an eastern spiritual retreat, visiting Iran, Afghanistan, India, Nepal, Sri Lanka, Bali, Thailand, Japan, and Hawaii. He also opened Utopia Sound Studios in Lake Hill, New York, just outside of Woodstock, and bought a home nearby, as well as an adjoining property to be taken over as accommodation for artists who used the studio. The Lake Hill complex on Mink Hollow Road remained Rundgren's base for the next six years. In the interim until his next solo effort, he recorded three albums with Utopia. The first, Disco Jets, was a tongue-in-cheek collection of instrumental disco tracks left unreleased until 2001. Ra (February 1977) was a concept album based on Egyptian mythology, which prefaced a lavish tour involving an extravagant stage set with a giant pyramid and Sphinx head. Oops! Wrong Planet (September 1977), recorded immediately after the tour, signaled the start of a more pop-oriented direction for the group.

By late 1977, Rundgren was in the midst of separating from then-girlfriend Bebe Buell and her infant daughter, Liv Tyler. Rundgren recalled leaving his home in New York City and sequestering himself at Mink Hollow, "after I discovered that I didn't want to cohabit any longer with Bebe, in any sense of the word ... A fortunate by-product of being so out of everything all the time and always being the odd man out ... is that you have plenty of time for self-examination." He intended the songs on his next solo album to be performed on piano with minimal arrangements, apart from the bass, drums and voices. In that sense, he stated that the songwriting process appeared to be "fairly conventional".

Hermit of Mink Hollow was released in May 1978. Popularly viewed as his most immediately accessible work since Something/Anything?, it received more public attention and radio airplay than most of Rundgren's efforts since A Wizard, a True Star and was heralded as a "return to form" after the string of prog records with Utopia. In the US, the LP peaked at number 36, while single "Can We Still Be Friends" reached number 29. The song became Rundgren's most-covered, with versions by Robert Palmer, Rod Stewart, Colin Blunstone, and Mandy Moore. To promote the work, Rundgren undertook an American tour playing at smaller venues including The Bottom Line in New York and The Roxy in Los Angeles. These shows resulted in the double live album Back to the Bars, which featured a mixture of material from his solo work and Utopia, performed with backing musicians including Utopia, Spencer Davis, Daryl Hall and John Oates and Stevie Nicks.

In 1980, Utopia recorded a Beatles parody album in the form of Deface the Music. It included "Everybody Else Is Wrong", another song perceived to have been aimed at Lennon. Later that year, Lennon was killed by Mark David Chapman, an obsessive Rundgren fan who was incensed by Lennon's remarks on religion. When he was apprehended, Chapman was wearing a promotional T-shirt for Hermit of Mink Hollow and had left a copy of Runt. The Ballad of Todd Rundgren in his hotel room. Rundgren was not aware of the connections until "way after the fact". When asked about the Melody Maker feud, Chapman stated he was not aware of the musicians' interactions in the press until years after they occurred.

==== Healing and Tortured Artist Effect ====
The year 1981 saw the album-long concept work Healing. His music video for the song "Time Heals" was among the first videos aired on MTV, and a video he produced for RCA, accompanied by Gustav Holst's The Planets, was used as a demo for their videodisc players. Rundgren's experience with computer graphics dates back to 1981, when he developed one of the first computer paint programs, dubbed the Utopia Graphics System; it ran on an Apple II with Apple's digitizer tablet. He is also the co-developer of the computer screensaver system Flowfazer.

On August 13, 1980, four masked men broke into Rundgren's Mink Hollow home and tied up Rundgren and his pregnant girlfriend.

The new wave-tinged The Ever Popular Tortured Artist Effect (1982) included a cover of the Small Faces' hit "Tin Soldier". "Bang the Drum All Day", an album single, was a minor chart hit. It later became more prominent and was adopted as an unofficial theme by several professional sports franchises, notably the Green Bay Packers. Disc Jockey Geno Michellini of KLOS in Los Angeles used "Bang the Drum All Day" as an unofficial kick-off to the weekend on Friday afternoons. "Bang the Drum All Day" was also featured in a Carnival Cruise television advertising campaign. It is now considered one of Rundgren's most popular songs. Tortured Artist marked the end of Rundgren's tenure with Bearsville Records.

=== 1980s–1990s: A Cappella, Nearly Human, and 2nd Wind ===
Rundgren signed with Warner Bros. Records, who issued his next album, A Cappella (1985), which was recorded using Rundgren's multi-tracked voice, accompanied by arrangements constructed entirely from programmed vocal samples. Rundgren scored four episodes of the popular children's television show Pee-wee's Playhouse in 1986.

Nearly Human (1989) and 2nd Wind (1991) were both recorded live—the former in the studio, the latter in a theater before a live audience, who were instructed to remain silent. Each song on these albums was recorded as a complete single take with no later overdubbing. Both albums marked, in part, a return to his Philly soul roots. 2nd Wind also included several excerpts from Rundgren's musical Up Against It, which was adapted from the screenplay (originally titled "Prick Up Your Ears"), that British playwright Joe Orton had originally offered to the Beatles for their never-made follow-up to the film Help! (1965).

Rundgren was an early adopter of the NewTek Video Toaster and made several videos with it. The first, for "Change Myself" from 2nd Wind, was widely distributed as a demo reel for the Toaster. Later, he set up a company to produce 3D animation using the Toaster; this company's first demo, "Theology" (a look at religious architecture through the ages featuring music by former Utopia bandmate Roger Powell) also became a widely circulated item among Toaster users.

In 1989, Rundgren hit the road with Nearly Human—2nd Wind band, which included brass and a trio of backup singers (one of whom, Michele Gray, Rundgren married). He also toured during 1992 with Ringo Starr's second All-Starr band. A brief 1992 tour of Japan reunited the Rundgren/Powell/Sulton/Wilcox lineup, and Redux '92: Live in Japan was released on Rhino Records.

=== 1990s–2000s: TR-I, PatroNet, and Liars ===
As the 90s began, Rundgren was already moving away from conventional notions of what a rock producer or recording artist should be ... While Rundgren would continue to produce records for himself, and others, many of the innovative and individual technologies and business models he embraced and/or pioneered over the next 20 years would have such an empowering effect on future artists as to render redundant record producers, big studios, and even record labels.

— Paul Myers, A Wizard, a True Star: Todd Rundgren in the Studio

The mid-1990s saw Rundgren recording under the pseudonym TR-i ("Todd Rundgren interactive") for two albums. The first of these, 1993's No World Order, consisted of hundreds of seconds-long snippets of music, that could be combined in various ways to suit the listener. Initially targeted for the Philips CD-i platform, No World Order featured interactive controls for tempo, mood, and other parameters, along with pre-programmed mixes by Rundgren himself, Bob Clearmountain, Don Was and Jerry Harrison. The disc was also released for PC and Macintosh and in two versions on standard audio CD, the continuous mix disc No World Order and, later, the more song-oriented No World Order Lite. The music itself was quite a departure from Rundgren's previous work, with a dance/techno feel and much rapping by Rundgren. The follow-up, The Individualist (1995), featured interactive video content, that could be viewed or in one case, played; it was a simple video game along with the music, which was more rock-oriented than No World Order.

In 1994, Rundgren composed the film score for the comedy film Dumb and Dumber, and contributed the song "Can We Still Be Friends?" to the soundtrack.

Rundgren returned to recording under his own name for With a Twist... (1997), an album of bossa-nova covers of his older material.

During this period, through a business venture he called Waking Dreams, Rundgren released SoundStream, a Netscape browser plugin for streaming MPEG audio. The plugin used real-time MP3 decoding software from Kauai Media, whose earlier MPEG/CD product had been distributed via the Internet Underground Music Archive.

As the Internet gained mass acceptance, Rundgren, along with longtime manager Eric Gardner and Apple digital music exec Kelli Richards, started PatroNet, which offered fans (patrons) access to his works-in-progress and new unreleased tracks in exchange for a subscription fee, cutting out record labels. The songs from Rundgren's first PatroNet run were later released as the album One Long Year (2000).

Since then, Rundgren has severed his connections with major record labels and continues to offer new music direct to subscribers via his website, although he also continues to record and release CDs through independent labels. As of 2022, the PatroNet.com website was not active.

=== 2000s–2010s ===
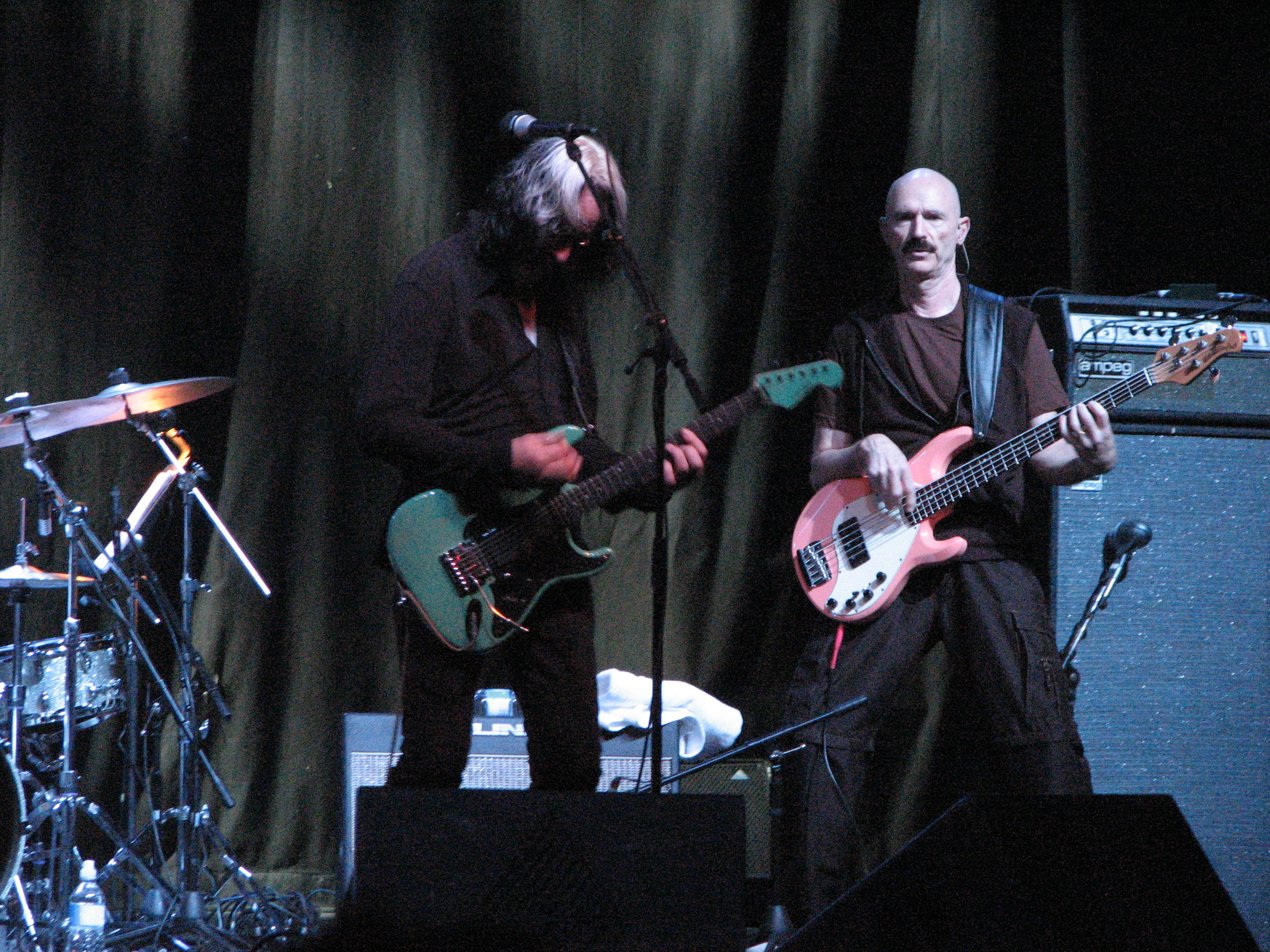
Rundgren and Tony Levin in Toronto, September 2006

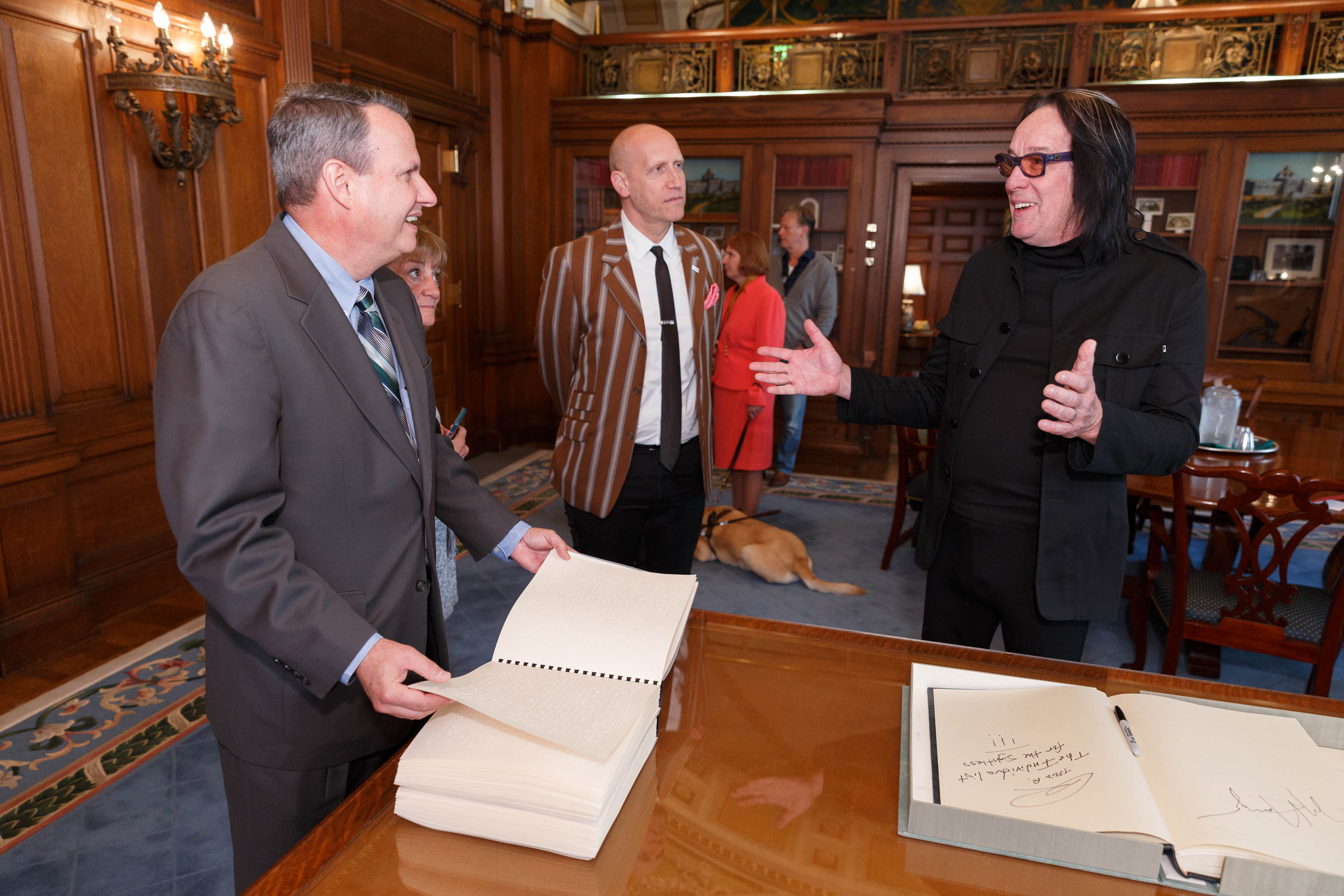
Rundgren (right) at the Library of Congress in 2019

In the aftermath of the September 11 attacks, Rundgren created the score for the film A Face to a Name, directed by Douglas Sloan. The film depicted numerous photographs of missing New Yorkers that were displayed on Bellevue Hospital's 'wall of prayers' following the attacks. The film was part of a special screening at the Woodstock Film Festival in 2002.

In 2004, Rundgren released Liars, a concept album that features a mixture of his older and newer sounds.

In late 2005, the Boston-based band the Cars were planning to re-form despite bassist Benjamin Orr's death and lack of interest on the part of former lead singer Ric Ocasek. Rumors followed that Rundgren had joined Elliot Easton and Greg Hawkes in rehearsals for a possible new Cars lineup. Initial speculation pointed to the New Cars being fleshed out with Clem Burke of Blondie and Art Alexakis of Everclear. Eventually the group completed their lineup with former Rundgren bassist Kasim Sulton and studio drummer Prairie Prince of the Tubes, who had played on XTC's Rundgren-produced Skylarking (1986) and who has recorded and toured with Rundgren.

In early 2006, the new lineup played a few private shows for industry professionals, played live on The Tonight Show with Jay Leno and made other media appearances before commencing a 2006 summer tour with the re-formed Blondie. Rundgren referred to the project as "an opportunity ... for me to pay my bills, play to a larger audience, work with musicians I know and like, and ideally have some fun for a year." The New Cars' first single, "Not Tonight", was released on March 20, 2006. A live album/greatest hits collection, The New Cars: It's Alive, was released in June 2006. The album includes classic Cars songs (and two Rundgren hits) recorded live plus three new studio tracks ("Not Tonight", "Warm", and "More")

In April 2011, Todd Rundgren's Johnson, a collection of Robert Johnson covers, which had been recorded more than a year earlier, was released. In another 2011, an album of covers, (re)Production, features Rundgren performing tracks he had previously produced for other acts, including Grand Funk Railroad's "Walk Like a Man" and XTC's "Dear God".

In 2017, Rundgren released White Knight, which features collaborations with Trent Reznor, Robyn, Daryl Hall, Joe Walsh and Donald Fagen.

In December 2018, Cleopatra Press published his self-penned memoir, The Individualist: Digressions, Dreams, and Dissertations. The book contains 181 chapters, each one page long, and each consisting of three paragraphs. He said that "I realized that I have to do this or somebody else will do it. I'm getting to the point where I could at some point not be able to do it myself, and then someone else would do it and I wouldn't be happy with the result." Its coverage ends at Rundgren's 50th birthday in 1998, which was the same time he began writing the book. Since then, he said, "my life has been a lot more boring ... I'm not doing as much record production as I used to, so interesting tales that go along with those projects don't exist anymore." On October 21, 2019, he stopped by the Library of Congress and signed a braille copy—which was produced for him by a fan and National Library Service for the Blind and Print Disabled patron who is blind.

Rundgren toured in late 2019 with Micky Dolenz, Jason Scheff, Christopher Cross and Joey Molland of Badfinger in celebration of the Beatles' self-titled 1968 album on the "It Was Fifty Years Ago Today – A Tribute to the Beatles' White Album".

=== 2020s ===
Rundgren collaborated with Weezer frontman Rivers Cuomo in 2020, releasing the single "Down with the Ship". In December, he released his English translation of the 1978 song "Flappie", originally by Dutch comedian Youp van 't Hek. That April, he reunited with Sparks 50 years after producing their debut album, releasing a single "Your Fandango". In September 2022, he released the album Space Force.

He provided additional vocals along with the Sunday Service Choir, on the track "My Soul", by hip-hop superduo ¥$, from their album Vultures 2, released on 3 August 2024.

== Style and recognition ==
=== As a solo artist ===
Writing for AllMusic, music critic Stephen Thomas Erlewine recognizes Rundgren thus:

Todd Rundgren's best-known songs – the Carole King pastiche "I Saw the Light", the ballads "Hello, It's Me" and "Can We Still Be Friends", and the goofy novelty "Bang on the Drum All Day" – suggest that he is a talented pop craftsman ... but at his core, Rundgren is a rock & roll maverick. Once he had a taste of success with his 1972 masterwork Something/Anything?, Rundgren chose to abandon stardom and, with it, conventional pop music. He began a course through uncharted musical territory, becoming a pioneer not only in electronic music and prog rock, but in music video, computer software, and Internet music delivery as well.

As a solo artist from 1972 to 1978, Rundgren scored four US Top 40 singles on the Billboard Hot 100, including one Top 10 hit with "Hello, It's Me", and three US Top 40 albums on the Billboard 200. He is one of the first acts to be prominent both as an artist and as a producer, and he was also influential in the fields of power pop, lo-fi, overdubbing, and experimental music. Rundgren performed in an eclectic variety of styles, so much so that his singles often contrasted with other tracks from the LPs from which they derived, which curtailed his mass appeal. Of his early incorporation of digital technology, he said "I wasn't the first to start recording digitally, because it was so expensive. But once the technology came down to where I could afford it, then I went digital." Rundgren said that adapting his sound to meet commercial expectations was also never an issue for him since he already made "so much money from production", a rare luxury for an artist.

=== As a producer ===
If it weren't for my musical career, I probably would have ended up attending college to become a computer programmer.

— Todd Rundgren

Comparisons are sometimes drawn between Rundgren and producer/artists Brian Wilson and Brian Eno. Biographer Paul Myers attributes the recording studio to be Rundgren's "ultimate instrument". Rundgren acknowledged that, in the case of his own records, he does not think "as a producer", but uses the studio to "assist in creating a performance". His recording processes continued in the same tradition as multitrack recording innovator Les Paul as well as the studio experiments of the Beatles and the Beach Boys.

According to biographer Myers, Rundgren himself came to inspire "a generation of self-contained geniuses like Prince ... Ironically, some of his innovations would come to liberate the recording artist in such a way as to lessen the perceived value, or need, for a record producer at all." (Note: A popular rumor is that Prince, before achieving fame, would attend Rundgren's concerts and attempt to meet him backstage.) Rundgren's influence is also cited to Hall & Oates, Björk and Daft Punk. Slate writer Marc Weingarten identified A Cappella (1985) as the precedent for Björk's "all vocals, all the time" experiment Medúlla (2004) and said that, overall, "The two [artists] share more common ground than their fans might think."

Rundgren's production work for other artists were largely one-off affairs. Exceptions were Grand Funk Railroad, the New York Dolls, the Tubes, Hello People, and the Pursuit of Happiness. He described his typical function as being a "'songcraft' agitator". In cases where the act's songs were unfinished, he would complete them and decline a writer's credit. Some of his collaborators frequently characterize him as a "genius", but also "sarcastic" and "aloof". (Note: For example, Greg Graffin of Bad Religion recalled for the sessions of The New America (2000): "Most producers suck your dick. ... That's why most records suck: You're not challenged. But we were legitimately challenged. He would be very honest. We got along great. He had a sharp tongue, and so do I." Conversely, Ev Olcutt of 12 Rods remembered that on Separation Anxieties from the same year, "All he would do was press the 'record' button and go back to doing crossword puzzles. Some of those songs are good, but Todd Rundgren did the absolute worst job possible with that record." Waymon Boone, frontman of the band Splender, recounted the time when Todd produced their album "Halfway Down the Sky" in 1999 on the Rundgren Radio Show in a 2010 interview. Boone went on to say that working with Rundgren was a nightmare, and that he would constantly leave early, not give any feedback during recordings, and once they'd run through a song, he'd tell them it was "fine" and would want them to move onto the next song. Boone even recounted at one point having to restrain himself from punching Rundgren in the face.) His most notorious production was for XTC's 1986 album Skylarking, known for the creative tensions and disagreements that arose during its sessions. The album is sometimes regarded as both the pinnacle of Rundgren's production career and of the career of XTC. He commented that, in spite of the turmoil surrounding its making, the record "ultimately ... sounds like we were having a great time doing it. And at times we were having a good time." All three members expressed admiration for the end product.

=== The Fool guitar ===
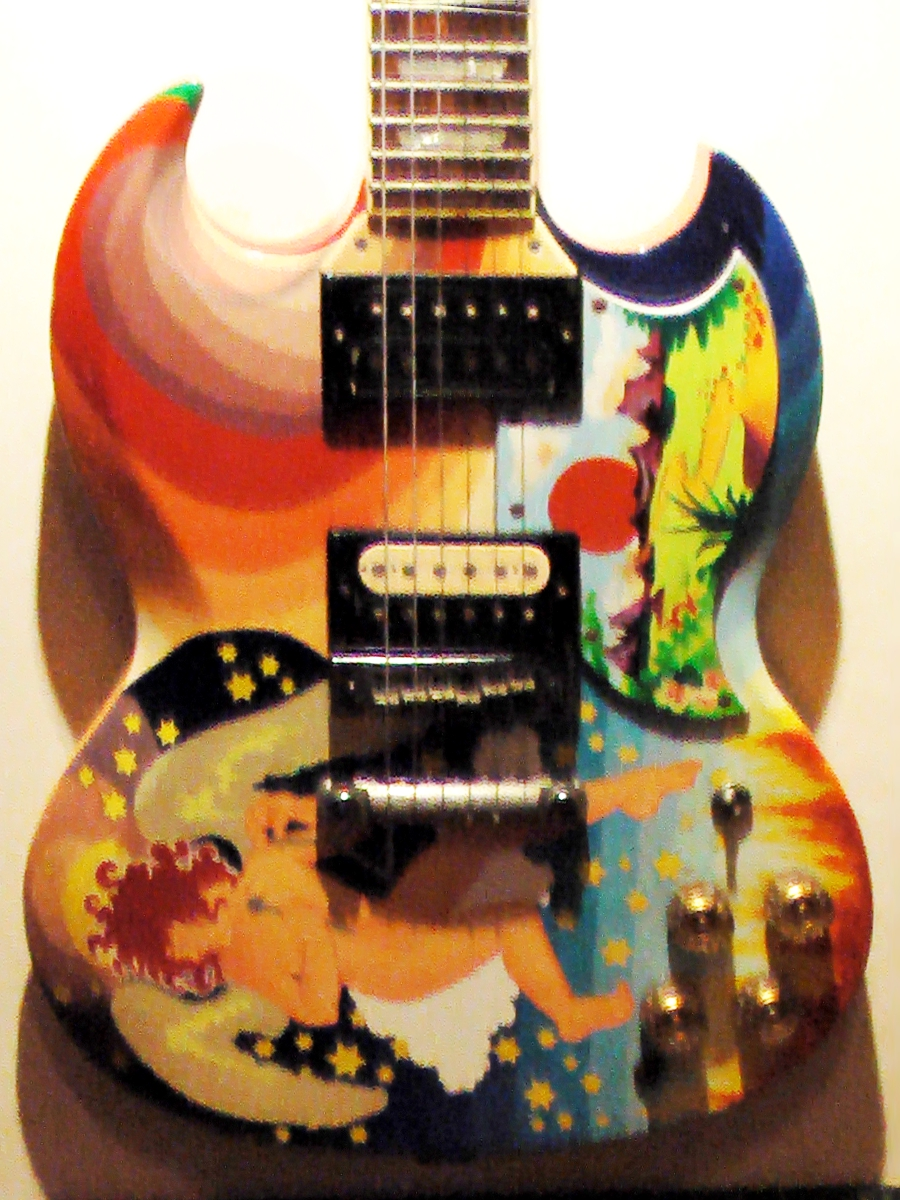
Throughout his live performances in the 1970s and 1980s, Rundgren often sported The Fool guitar originally owned by Eric Clapton and given to Rundgren by Jackie Lomax.

During the mid-to-late 1970s, Rundgren regularly played the eye-catching psychedelic Gibson SG (known variously as "Sunny" or "The Fool"), which Eric Clapton had played in Cream. After he had stopped using it ca. 1968, Clapton gave the guitar to George Harrison, who subsequently 'loaned' it to British singer Jackie Lomax. In 1972, after meeting at a recording session, Lomax sold the guitar to Rundgren for $500 with an option to buy it back, which he never took up. Rundgren played it extensively during the early years of Utopia before retiring the instrument for a short time in the mid to late 1970s, which in that time he had the guitar restored having a lacquer finish applied to protect the paint and replaced the tailpiece and bridge to stabilize tuning, bringing the guitar back out on tour during the 1980 Deface the Music tour and using it on and off throughout the 1980s until 1993 when he permanently retired the guitar, eventually auctioning it off in 1999; he now uses a reproduction given to him in 1988 by a Japanese fan.

== Personal life ==
Rundgren began a relationship with model Bebe Buell in 1972. During a break in their relationship, Buell had a brief relationship with Aerosmith lead vocalist Steven Tyler, which resulted in an unplanned pregnancy. Buell gave birth to Liv Tyler on July 1, 1977. Buell initially claimed that Rundgren was the biological father and named the child Liv Rundgren. Shortly after Liv's birth, Rundgren and Buell ended their romantic relationship, but Rundgren remained committed to Liv. At the age of eleven, Liv learned that her biological father was Steven Tyler.

According to Liv Tyler, "Todd basically decided when I was born that I needed a father so he signed my birth certificate. He knew that there was a chance that I might not be his, but ..." Buell’s stated reason for claiming that Rundgren was Liv's father was that Tyler was too heavily addicted to drugs at the time of Liv's birth.

Tyler maintains a close relationship with Rundgren. "I'm so grateful to him, I have so much love for him. You know, when he holds me it feels like Daddy. And he's very protective and strong."

Rundgren had a long-term relationship with Karen Darvin, with whom he had two sons, Rex (born 1980) and Randy (born 1985). Rex was a minor league baseball player (infielder) for nine seasons. Darvin had previously been in a relationship with Bruce Springsteen.

Rundgren married Michele Gray in 1998. Gray was a dancer with the Tubes in 1985 when Utopia opened for them. Shortly thereafter, she began performing with Rundgren as a backup singer, including his A Cappella tour later that year. She also sang on the tour for his album Nearly Human (1989) which led to a number of appearances on Late Night with David Letterman as one of "The World's Most Dangerous Backup Singers". Together, they have a son, named Rebop, and an adoptive son, named Keoni.

Paul Myers, in his 2010 book on Rundgren, A Wizard, a True Star: Todd Rundgren in the Studio, reported that Rundgren diagnosed himself with attention-deficit disorder.

== Awards and honors ==
- 1984: Grammy Award nomination for Best Music Video – "Videosyncracy"
- 1995: Berkeley Lifetime Achievement Award from the Popular Culture Society at UC Berkeley.
- 2017: Honorary doctorate from Berklee College of Music, where he delivered the commencement address, and an honorary doctorate from DePauw University.
- 2018: Nominated for the Rock and Roll Hall of Fame's class of 2019. Since becoming eligible in 1995, he has often been asked about his absence from the Hall of Fame. A 2018 poll conducted by the institution, which is not factored in the final vote, placed Rundgren as the third-most deserving nominee on the ballot. (Note: Janet Jackson, who did make the induction, was more than 100,000 votes behind in sixth place.) In 2016, Rundgren told an interviewer: "It doesn't have the same cachet as a Nobel Peace Prize or some historical foundation. If I told you about how they actually determine who gets into the Hall of Fame, you'd think that I was bullshitting you, because I've been told what's involved. ... It's just as corrupt as anything else, and that's why I don't care."
- 2021: Inducted into the Rock and Roll Hall of Fame.

== Discography ==
Solo albums

- Runt (1970)
- Runt. The Ballad of Todd Rundgren (1971)
- Something/Anything? (1972)
- A Wizard, a True Star (1973)
- Todd (1974)
- Initiation (1975)
- Faithful (1976)
- Hermit of Mink Hollow (1978)
- Healing (1981)
- The Ever Popular Tortured Artist Effect (1982)
- A Cappella (1985)
- Nearly Human (1989)
- 2nd Wind (1991)
- No World Order (1993) (as TR-I)
- The Individualist (1995) (as TR-I)
- With a Twist... (1997) (remakes album)
- One Long Year (2000)
- Liars (2004)
- Arena (2008)
- Todd Rundgren's Johnson (2011) (covers album)
- (re)Production (2011) (covers album)
- State (2013)
- Global (2015)
- White Knight (2017)
- Space Force (2022)

Nazz

- Nazz (1968)
- Nazz Nazz (1969)
- Nazz III (1971)

Utopia

- Todd Rundgren's Utopia (1974)
- Another Live (1975)
- Ra (1977)
- Oops! Wrong Planet (1977)
- Adventures in Utopia (1979)
- Deface the Music (1980)
- Swing to the Right (1982)
- Utopia (1982)
- Oblivion (1984)
- POV (1985)

Other albums

- Up Against It! (1997)
  (1980s demos for the musical of the same name)
- Somewhere/Anywhere (1998)
  (Japanese-imported compilation of unreleased tracks)
- Disco Jets (2001)
  (Utopia album recorded 1976)
- It's Alive! (2006)
  (The New Cars)
- Runddans (2015) (with Lindstrøm and Emil Nikolaisen)

Selected productions

- The American Dream (1970) – The American Dream
- Straight Up (1971) – Badfinger
- Halfnelson (1971) – Halfnelson/Sparks
- New York Dolls (1973) – New York Dolls
- We're an American Band (1973) – Grand Funk Railroad
- Ass (1973) – Badfinger
- Shinin' On (1974) – Grand Funk Railroad
- War Babies (1974) – Hall & Oates
- Bat Out of Hell (1977) – Meat Loaf
- Remote Control (1979) – The Tubes
- Wave (1979) – Patti Smith Group
- Wasp (1980) – Shaun Cassidy
- Walking Wild (1981) – New England
- Forever Now (1982) – The Psychedelic Furs
- Next Position Please (1983) – Cheap Trick
- Love Bomb (1985) – The Tubes
- Skylarking (1986) – XTC
- Dreams of Ordinary Men (1986) – Dragon
- Yoyo (1987) – Bourgeois Tagg
- Love Junk (1988) – The Pursuit of Happiness
- One Sided Story (1990) – The Pursuit of Happiness
- Things Here Are Different (1990) – Jill Sobule
- The World's Most Dangerous Party (1993) – Paul Shaffer & The Party Boys of Rock 'n' Roll
- The New America (2000) – Bad Religion
- Separation Anxieties (2000) – 12 Rods
- Cause I Sez So (2009) – New York Dolls
