= With a Twist (Todd Rundgren album) =

With a Twist...

Studio album by Todd Rundgren
- Released: September 23, 1997
- Genres: Bossa nova; lounge
- Length: 42:51
- Label: Guardian
- Producer: Todd Rundgren

Todd Rundgren chronology
The Individualist (1995)	With a Twist... (1997)	Up Against It! (1997)

Professional ratings
Review scores
Source	Rating
AllMusic	2/5 stars
Classic Rock	7/10 stars
Uncut	4/5 stars

With a Twist... is the sixteenth studio album by American musician Todd Rundgren, released on September 23, 1997 by Guardian Records. Asked to produce an album of new versions of his older singles, Rundgren decided to record the songs in Bossa nova style with elements of Exotica, complete with tropical bird call effects at the beginning of "Hello, It's Me" similar to Martin Denny's recording Quiet Village. Continuing the theme, Rundgren toured theaters with a replica of a tiki bar, the performers on a very small stage with selected audience members being seated at tables also on the theater stage, and being served drinks by the monitor engineer/bartender. The performers never acknowledged the larger theater audience, and the show ended when the last "bar patron" left the stage.

A re-recording of "Love of the Common Man" from Faithful, done in a style similar to that heard here, was included on the later album One Long Year.

== Track listing ==
All songs by Todd Rundgren unless otherwise indicated.

No.	Title	Length
1.	"I Saw the Light"	3:43
2.	"Influenza"	4:21
3.	"Can We Still Be Friends"	3:36
4.	"Mated"	4:45
5.	"It Wouldn't Have Made Any Difference"	4:20
6.	"Love Is the Answer"	3:53
7.	"Fidelity"	4:00
8.	"Never Never Land" (Betty Comden, Adolph Green, Jule Styne)	2:03
9.	"Hello It's Me"	4:29
10.	"I Want You" (Leon Ware, Arthur "T-Boy" Ross)	4:42
11.	"A Dream Goes On Forever"	2:59

== Personnel ==
Credits adapted from the CD liner notes.

- Todd Rundgren - vocals, arranger
- Jesse Gress - guitars, arranger
- Kasim Sulton - bass
- John Ferenzik - keyboards
- Prairie Prince - drums, percussion

Additional musicians

- Tripp Sprague - tenor saxophone (3)
- David Killingsworth - whistle (8)

Other credits

- Todd Rundgren - producer, engineer
- Jean Lannen - photography
- Danny O'Connor - photography
- Robert Abriola - art direction
