= Nazz Nazz =

Studio album by Nazz
- Released: April 7, 1969
- Recorded: January–February 1969
- Studios: I. D. Sound Studios, Hollywood
- Genres: Blues rock, pop, soul
- Length: 45:31
- Label: SGC
- Producer: Nazz

Nazz chronology
Nazz (1968)	Nazz Nazz (1969)	Nazz III (1971)

Singles from Nazz Nazz
- 1. "Not Wrong Long" b/w "Under the Ice" Released: April 1969

Professional ratings
Review scores
Source	Rating
Allmusic	4/5 stars

Nazz Nazz is the second studio album by American rock band Nazz, released in April 1969 by SGC Records. The album's recording was marked by bitter artistic disagreements and power struggles among the group, and the Nazz broke up shortly after it was completed. It sold only modestly well upon release but has gained greater attention due to positive critical reappraisals following Nazz guitarist Todd Rundgren's emergence as a star.

== Recording ==
In January 1969, the Nazz traveled to England to record their second album at Trident Studios. However, after only a day's worth of work, the Musician's Union barred the Nazz from recording in the United Kingdom because the paperwork to allow them to record there had not been filled out properly. The only recordings they managed to do at Trident were a rough cut of "Christopher Columbus" (which ended up being omitted from the album's final track list) and instrumental tracks for "Under the Ice".

The band thus returned to I. D. Sound in Hollywood, California (the studio where they recorded their debut album) to record the album, with James Lowe as engineer. It has often been claimed that the album was originally entitled "Fungo Bat", but Nazz members Todd Rundgren, Thom Mooney, and Stewkey have all maintained that "Fungo Bat" was just a joke working title which they never would have used for the actual release.

Guitarist and songwriter Todd Rundgren assumed the role of producer and began composing keyboard-oriented material heavily influenced by singer/songwriter Laura Nyro. The other band members objected to this change in style and to Rundgren's suddenly asserting control of the group as producer, with drummer Thom Mooney later commenting, "Todd was turning into a, um ... affectionately I would say, a narcissistic megalomaniac. I say that with great love, too, because it includes an incredible, overwhelming talent. But also the narcissism of wanting to share space with no one." Lead vocalist/keyboardist Stewkey objected so strongly to some of the new songs that he refused to sing them, leaving Rundgren to handle lead vocals himself.

The recording of the keyboards was another major point of contention. Mooney said that he once caught Rundgren having a session musician record over Stewkey's keyboard parts in the early hours of the day, when Rundgren thought none of the other band members would be in the studio. Rundgren explained: "It became too difficult to teach Stewkey the stuff I was working on. Stewkey was a fairly utilitarian keyboard player; he didn't spend a lot of time practicing. It wasn't like he was classically trained or strove to be a soloist." Stewkey, however, maintained that Rundgren often did not make enough effort, saying that during the Nazz Nazz sessions he often came in with a new song and expected Stewkey to record the keyboard part on the spot, with no time to learn or rehearse it.

Rundgren said "A Beautiful Song" "was the obligatory epic. Each record had a tune at the end you could skip if you wanted to. I made the assumption - and therefore imprinted it into the band - that one of the things that made The Beatles and Beach Boys successful was to bring in other sorts of instrumentation." Another instance of this was running wet fingers around the rims of wine glasses for "Letters Don't Count". The band spent an entire morning tuning the wine glasses.

Bassist Carson Van Osten departed the group shortly after Nazz Nazz was recorded. The band did a few shows as a trio, with temporary bassists taking Van Osten's place, but before long Rundgren also felt the tensions in the group were too much and quit. The album was originally intended as a double album but as its release date approached, the two remaining members of the Nazz (Stewkey and Mooney) both pushed for it to be pared down to a single disc, feeling that it was pretentious for such a new and unknown band to release a double album. The record label acceded to their wishes. Much of the leftover material was used on the posthumous Nazz III album.

== Release ==
On first release in April 1969 there was a limited edition by SGC Records on red vinyl. Most SGC copies were on black vinyl. The album peaked at number 88 on Billboard's pop album chart. A reissue by Rhino Records in the 1980s was also on red vinyl. The album has also been released by Rhino on CD.

== Track listing ==
All songs written by Todd Rundgren.

=== Side one ===
1. "Forget All About It" – 3:15
2. "Not Wrong Long" – 2:30
3. "Rain Rider" – 3:52
4. "Gonna Cry Today" – 3:15
5. "Meridian Leeward" – 3:20
6. "Under the Ice" – 5:40

=== Side two ===
7. "Hang On Paul" – 2:42
8. "Kiddie Boy" – 3:30
9. "Featherbedding Lover" – 2:47
10. "Letters Don't Count" – 3:25
11. "A Beautiful Song" – 11:15

== Personnel ==
=== Nazz ===
- Todd Rundgren – electric guitar, keyboards, horn arrangements, string arrangements, backing vocals, lead vocal on "Kiddie Boy" and "Forget All About It" (2nd verse and bridge only)
- Stewkey – lead vocals, keyboards
- Carson Van Osten – bass guitar, backing vocals
- Thom Mooney – drums, backing vocals

=== Technical ===
- Nazz – producer
- James Lowe – engineer
- Haig Adishian – design
- Bruce Laurance – photography

== Charts ==
Album

Year	Chart	Position
1969	US Billboard Pop Albums	80

Single

Year	Single	Chart	Position
1969	"Not Wrong Long"	Canada RPM Album Chart	90
