= The Individualist =

Studio album by TR-i
- Released: October 31, 1995
- Genre: Rock
- Length: 60:59
- Label: Digital Entertainment
- Producer: Todd Rundgren

TR-i chronology
No World Order (1993)	The Individualist (1995)	With a Twist... (1997)

Singles from The Individualist
- 1. "Espresso (All Jacked Up)" Released: 1994

Professional ratings
Review scores
Source	Rating
AllMusic	2/5 stars
Classic Rock	6/10 stars

The Individualist is the fifteenth studio album by American musician Todd Rundgren, under the pseudonym "TR-i", released on October 31, 1995. The second of Rundgren's TR-i projects, following 1993's No World Order, the album saw Rundgren play all instruments during the recording sessions.

The Enhanced CD includes interactive "play" with video experiences (on compatible computers) for every song, and listeners can play "Cast the First Stone" as a video game. "Espresso (All Jacked Up)" and "Woman's World" are also interactive videos.

The lyrical content is largely political and spiritual, with Rundgren expressing his outspoken views against conservatism, particularly on "Family Values" with its slams against Dan Quayle. "Tables Will Turn" is a song about social inequity and how inevitably the situation will change. "If Not Now, When?" expresses anger against those who claim they want positive change but are too apathetic to act. In accordance with the humanism which has always driven Rundgren's lyrics, in "The Ultimate Crime" he sings "the ultimate crime is not to care." The funky track "Espresso (All Jacked Up)" is a song about travel and having fun in life. "The Individualist" is a laid-back track utilising rapping, as on No World Order as Rundgren reflects on his desire to see the truth of things and not be subjected to other's views of reality. It includes a humorous jab at Prince's name change: "Change my name to some funky fresh dingbat/Like 'the artist formerly known as TR-i'". "Cast the First Stone" is an example of Rundgren's heavier, more raucous electronic style. In it, Rundgren rails against moral hypocrites. It is similar in feel and sentiment to songs such as "Mammon" and "Liars" on his later Liars album but also to "Fascist Christ" from No World Order. In "Beloved Infidel", a plaintive ballad, Rundgren sings sadly of how the "weak are vilified and wicked glorified"; he awaits the return of the beloved infidel, which seems a metaphor for truth, when the 'liberation bell' will be rung. "Temporary Sanity", which has a rapped middle-eight, is a protest against the insanity of the human race's obsessions with wars and vanity.

== Track listing ==
All songs by Todd Rundgren.

1. "Tables Will Turn" – 8:51
2. "If Not Now, When?" – 4:42
3. "Family Values" – 6:42
4. "The Ultimate Crime" – 4:37
5. "Espresso (All Jacked Up)" – 5:51
6. "The Individualist" – 7:30
7. "Cast the First Stone" – 5:06
8. "Beloved Infidel" – 4:11
9. "Temporary Sanity" – 6:24
10. "Woman's World" – 7:00

== Personnel ==
Adapted from the CD liner notes.

- Todd Rundgren - all vocals and instruments (except where noted), producer, engineer

Additional musicians

- Mary Lou Arnold - backing vocals (3)
- Ed Bishop - backing vocals (3)
- John Ferenzik - backing vocals (3)
- Jesse Gress - backing vocals (3)
- Ann Lang - backing vocals (3)
- Tom Nicholson - backing vocals (3)
