= The Ever Popular Tortured Artist Effect =

Studio album by Todd Rundgren
- Released: December 30, 1982
- Recorded: 1982
- Studios: Utopia Sound, Lake Hill, New York
- Genre: Pop rock
- Length: 35:08
- Labels: Bearsville, Rhino
- Producer: Todd Rundgren

Todd Rundgren chronology
Healing (1981)	The Ever Popular Tortured Artist Effect (1982)	A Cappella (1985)

Singles from The Ever Popular Tortured Artist Effect
- 1. "Hideaway" Released: October 1982; 2. "Bang the Drum All Day" Released: April 1983

Professional ratings
Review scores
Source	Rating
AllMusic	4/5 stars
Rolling Stone	4/5 stars

The Ever Popular Tortured Artist Effect is the tenth album by the American musician Todd Rundgren, released on December 30, 1982, by Bearsville Records. The album would be his last official release with Bearsville before its closure in 1984. The album is a return to the pop sound for which Rundgren is generally most lauded by critics. Considering it a contractual obligation, he spent little time working on Tortured Artist (hence the title). However, the album was well-received, and Rundgren scored a hit with the novelty song "Bang the Drum All Day".

== Track listing ==
All tracks are written by Todd Rundgren, except where noted.

Side one
No.	Title	Length
1.	"Hideaway"	4:58
2.	"Influenza"	4:29
3.	"Don't Hurt Yourself"	3:41
4.	"There Goes Your Baybay"	3:53

Side two
No.	Title	Writer(s)	Length
5.	"Tin Soldier"	Ronnie Lane; Steve Marriott	3:10
6.	"Emperor of the Highway"		1:39
7.	"Bang the Drum All Day"		3:32
8.	"Drive"		5:26
9.	"Chant"		4:20
Total length:			35:08

== Personnel ==
- Todd Rundgren - all vocals and instruments

=== Technical ===
- Produced and engineered by Todd Rundgren
- Additional engineering – Bean
- Art direction – Todd Rundgren

== Charts ==
Album

Chart performance for The Ever Popular Tortured Artist Effect
Chart (1976)	Peak position
US Billboard 200	66

Single

Chart performance for The Ever Popular Tortured Artist Effect
Single	Chart (1976)	Peak position
Bang The Drum All Day	UK Singles (Official Charts)	86
Bang The Drum All Day	US Billboard Hot 100	63
Bang The Drum All Day	US Mainstream Rock Airplay (Billboard)	29
