= Todd Rundgren's Johnson =

Studio album by Todd Rundgren
- Released: April 12, 2011
- Genre: Blues
- Length: 40:08
- Label: MPCA
- Producer: Todd Rundgren

Todd Rundgren chronology
Arena (2008)	Todd Rundgren's Johnson (2011)	(re)Production (2011)

Alternative Cover
- 2022 Cleopatra Records Reissue Artwork

Todd Rundgren's Johnson is the twentieth studio album by American musician Todd Rundgren, released on April 12, 2011 by MPCA Records. The album is a tribute to blues musician Robert Johnson, and released on Johnson's 100th birthday. Rundgren started out playing guitar professionally in a blues garage band called Woody's Truck Stop, around 1966, where he was heavily inspired by and performed blues songs by Paul Butterfield Blues Band, the Blues Project, and music by original Chess blues artists and British blues-rock groups like the Yardbirds.

This album is a testimony to that music, its direct predecessors, and influence, as Rundgren says, "When I first got out of high school, my first gig was in a blues band. I was fascinated with the music and all through high school started exploring recordings by a lot of the originals. Ironically enough, Robert Johnson wasn’t one of the people that I was familiar with. He was from an era of acoustic blues and I was very much into electric blues. But he did have a huge influence on a lot of the people that were influencing me — most particularly Eric Clapton, Jeff Beck and that whole crop of English blues guitar players."

Most of the tracks feature Rundgren playing everything but the bass, which he delegated to long-time associate Kasim Sulton.

The album's title is a double entendre, johnson being a euphemism for penis. Rundgren discusses the album in detail with Ultimate Classic Rock.

Rundgren also released a live version, Todd Rundgren's Johnson Live, on December 3, 2013.

== Track listing ==
All tracks written by Robert Johnson, except where noted

1. "Dust My Broom" – 2:45
2. "Stop Breakin Down" – 3:52
3. "Kindhearted Woman Blues" – 3:08
4. "Walking Blues" (Son House) – 3:24
5. "Love in Vain" – 3:42
6. "Last Fair Deal Gone Down" – 2:53
7. "Sweet Home Chicago" – 5:19
8. "They're Red Hot" – 2:38
9. "Come On in My Kitchen" – 2:58
10. "Hellhound on My Trail" – 3:28
11. "Traveling Riverside Blues" – 2:58
12. "Crossroads Blues" – 3:06

== Personnel ==
- Todd Rundgren - all vocals and instruments, producer, engineer, mixing
- Kasim Sulton - bass
