= Arena (Todd Rundgren album) =

Studio album by Todd Rundgren
- Released: September 30, 2008
- Genre: Rock
- Length: 56:35
- Label: Hi Fi
- Producer: Todd Rundgren

Todd Rundgren chronology
Liars (2004)	Arena (2008)	Todd Rundgren's Johnson (2011)

Singles from Arena
- 1. "Mountaintop" Released: 2008

Professional ratings
Review scores
Source	Rating
allmusic	3.5/5 stars

Arena is the nineteenth studio album by American musician Todd Rundgren, released on September 30, 2008 by Hi Fi Recordings.

Like several of his earlier albums, this was entirely a solo effort, with Rundgren playing all the instruments. In contrast to his earlier albums, he produced this album entirely on an Apple laptop computer using Propellerhead's Reason software for composition and Sonoma Wire Works' RiffWorks for recording. All audio processing was done with software tools as well, except for a Line 6 Toneport guitar input box.

== Track listing ==
All tracks are written by Todd Rundgren.

1. "Mad" – 3:35
2. "Afraid" – 4:52
3. "Mercenary" – 4:02
4. "Gun" – 3:54
5. "Courage" – 3:44
6. "Weakness" – 5:15
7. "Strike" – 3:29
8. "Pissin" – 4:39
9. "Today" – 5:22
10. "Bardo" – 6:13
11. "Mountaintop" – 4:18
12. "Panic" – 3:11
13. "Manup" – 4:00

== Personnel ==
- Todd Rundgren - all vocals and instruments, producer, engineer, cover art design
