= Nazz (album) =

Studio album by Nazz
- Released: October 1968
- Recorded: April 1968
- Studios: I. D. Sound Studios, Hollywood
- Genres: Psychedelic rock; garage rock; acid rock; pop rock
- Length: 38:13
- Label: SGC
- Producers: Bill Traut; Michael Friedman; Nazz

Nazz chronology
Nazz (1968)	Nazz Nazz (1969)

Singles from Nazz
- 1. "Open My Eyes" / "Hello It's Me" Released: July 1968

Professional ratings
Review scores
Source	Rating
AllMusic	4/5 stars

Nazz is the debut album by American rock group Nazz. It was released in 1968. The album spawned one single, "Open My Eyes", with "Hello It's Me" as the B-side, the latter reaching number 66 on the Billboard Pop Singles chart. "Open My Eyes" failed to chart but came to be regarded as a psychedelic rock classic, appearing on several compilations of the genre. "Hello It's Me" became a hit when Nazz guitarist Todd Rundgren re-recorded it for his 1972 solo album Something/Anything?.

The track "Open My Eyes" was accompanied by a promo video, directed by Ray Dennis Steckler. Nazz peaked at number 118 on Billboard's Pop Albums chart.

The album was remastered and rereleased in 2006 with bonus tracks by Sanctuary Records Group.

== Background and recording ==
Following a showcase at the Boston Tea Party in January 1968, The Nazz were signed by Screen Gems-Columbia. In April 1968 the band entered the eight-track recording studio I. D. Sound Studios in Hollywood, California. By this time the band had all the songs they needed for their first album written, most of which favored a guitar-oriented sound, since lead vocalist/keyboardist Stewkey enjoyed being front man much more than being a keyboardist.

The song "If That's the Way you Feel" was heavily inspired by the work of Jimmy Webb. Guitarist Todd Rundgren said writing the song was "Really laborious for me, I didn't really know how to write music. Shorty Rogers did the arrangement and had to do a lot of corrections."

After considering and then discarding the idea of having Felix Pappalardi produce the album, the Nazz picked Bill Traut instead. According to Rundgren, "[Bill Traut] didn't really do anything except read the trade papers. He didn't have any music suggestions. We should have got someone like Glyn Johns." Rundgren was dissatisfied with Traut's final mix of the album, so the Nazz went to a studio in New York to do overdubs and remixing for two tracks, "Open My Eyes" and "Hello It's Me". The Nazz wanted a flanging effect for "Open My Eyes" but the studio engineers did not know how to create it; Rundgren discovered how to do it accidentally while playing with a two-track tape machine.

== Track listing ==
All songs written by Todd Rundgren, except where noted.

=== Side one ===
1. "Open My Eyes" – 2:48
2. "Back of Your Mind" – 3:48
3. "See What You Can Be" – 3:00
4. "Hello It's Me" – 3:57
5. "Wildwood Blues" (Rundgren, Thom Mooney, Stewkey, Carson Van Osten) – 4:39

=== Side two ===
6. "If That's the Way You Feel" – 4:49
7. "When I Get My Plane" – 3:08
8. "Lemming Song" – 4:26
9. "Crowded" (Mooney, Stewkey) – 2:20
10. "She's Goin' Down" – 4:58

=== 2006 Castle Music reissue bonus tracks ===
11. "Nazz Radio Commercials" - 3:02
12. "Train Kept A-Rollin'" (album outtake) (Tiny Bradshaw, Howard Kay, Lois Mann) - 3:22
13. "Magic Me" (pre-LP audition tape) - 2:47
14. "See What You Can Be" (pre-LP audition tape) - 2:52
15. "Hello It's Me" (demo) - 3:51
16. "Crowded" (demo) - 2:48
17. "Open My Eyes" (non-phased demo) - 2:40
18. "Lemming Song" (demo) - 4:04
19. "The Nazz Are Blue" (live) (Jeff Beck, Keith Relf, Paul Samwell-Smith, Chris Dreja, Jim McCarty) - 3:47
20. "Why Is It Me?" (early version of "Lemming Song" by Woody's Truck Stop) - 3:09
21. "Hello It's Me" (mono single mix) - 4:06
22. "Open My Eyes" (mono single mix) - 2:05

== Personnel ==
=== Nazz ===
- Todd Rundgren – electric guitar, backing vocals, string arrangements, mixing
- Robert "Stewkey" Antoni – lead vocals, organ, electric and acoustic pianos
- Carson Van Osten – bass guitar, backing vocals
- Thom Mooney – drums, percussion

=== Technical ===
- Bill Traut – producer (tracks 2–3, 5–10)
- Michael Friedman – producer (tracks 1, 4), photography
- Chris Huston – associate producer
- Bill Inglot – remastering, digital remastering
- Ken Perry – remastering, digital remastering
- Joel Brodsky – photography
- Jon Landau – liner notes

== Charts ==
Album

Year	Chart	Position
1968	US Billboard Pop Albums	118

Single

Year	Single	Chart	Position
1968	"Open My Eyes"	Billboard Pop Singles	112
1969	"Hello It's Me"	Canada RPM Singles Chart	39
1969	"Hello It's Me"	Billboard Pop Singles	66
