= (re)Production =

Studio album by Todd Rundgren
- Released: September 23, 2011
- Recorded: January 2011
- Studio: Track Shack (Sacramento)
- Genres: Rock; synth-pop; electronica
- Length: 55:48
- Label: Gigatone
- Producer: Todd Rundgren

Todd Rundgren chronology
| Todd Rundgren's Johnson (2011) | (re)Production (2011) | State (2013) |

Alternative Cover
- Download Edition Artwork

Professional ratings
Review scores
| Source | Rating |
|---|---|
| allmusic | 2.0/5 stars |

(re)Production is the twenty-first studio album by American musician Todd Rundgren, released on September 23, 2011, by Gigatone. For this album, Rundgren re-recorded songs that he had produced for other bands across his career, including Meat Loaf, Hall & Oates, The Tubes and Grand Funk Railroad. (re)Production gives these songs a much more modern sheen, incorporating elements of electronic dance music and synthpop. The work was created during the MyRecordFantasy Camp sessions at the Track Shack in January 2011 arranged by the label Gigatone Records. Album packaging includes samples of cover art submissions by fans. Alternate covers were used for International, Domestic, and online versions.

== Track listing ==
| No. | Title | Original artist | Length |
|---|---|---|---|
| 1. | "Prime Time" (Bill Spooner, Fee Waybill, Michael Cotten, Prairie Prince, Re Styles, Rick Anderson, Roger Steen, Vince Welnick) | The Tubes | 3:29 |
| 2. | "Dancing Barefoot" (Ivan Král, Patti Smith) | Patti Smith | 3:56 |
| 3. | "Two Out of Three Ain't Bad" (Jim Steinman) | Meat Loaf | 3:21 |
| 4. | "Chasing Your Ghost" (Alain Johannes) | What Is This? | 3:29 |
| 5. | "Love My Way" (John Ashton, Richard Butler, Tim Butler, Vince Ely) | Psychedelic Furs | 4:31 |
| 6. | "Personality Crisis" (David Johansen, Johnny Thunders) | New York Dolls | 3:53 |
| 7. | "Is It a Star?" (Daryl Hall, John Oates) | Hall & Oates | 3:38 |
| 8. | "Tell Me Your Dreams" (Chris Eaton) | Jill Sobule | 3:50 |
| 9. | "Take It All" (Pete Ham) | Badfinger | 4:08 |
| 10. | "I Can't Take It" (Robin Zander) | Cheap Trick | 3:11 |
| 11. | "Dear God" (Andy Partridge) | XTC | 3:59 |
| 12. | "Out of My Mind" (Brent Bourgeois) | Bourgeois Tagg | 3:27 |
| 13. | "Everything" (Rick Derringer) | Rick Derringer | 4:25 |
| 14. | "Walk Like a Man" (Don Brewer, Mark Farner) | Grand Funk Railroad | 3:36 |
| 15. | "Nothing to Lose" (Johanna Pigott, Todd Hunter) | Dragon | 3:05 |

== Personnel ==
Credits adapted from the CD liner notes.

Performers

- Todd Rundgren – vocals and various instruments, engineer, mixing
- David J. Moore – backing vocals (1, 2, 14)
- Laura Boton – backing vocals (5, 9, 14)
- Don Slovin – backing vocals (14), tin whistle (5)
- Mary Ellen Manning – backing vocals (14), guitar (9)
- Bruce Whetstone – backing vocals (14), bass (9)
- Tim Longfellow – backing vocals (14), Hammond XB2 organ (9)
- Daniel Iasbeck – backing vocals, guitar (14)
- Chris Landes, Chuck Silber, Dave Holscher, David Mobley, David Zimelis, Dee Ann Schaer, Don Ballance, Donna Andreassen, Grady Moates, James May, James Van Wert, Joan Carlson, Joe Menga, John Enghauser, John Smith, Kevin Stoker, Lori Brown, Robert Warwas, Roy Swanson, Shereen Skalsky, Susan Leonard, Tami Gilliam – backing vocals (14)
- Sam LaMonica – drums (14)

Other credits

- Bill Bricker – cover art
