= Healing (Todd Rundgren album) =

Studio album by Todd Rundgren
- Released: January 28, 1981
- Genres: New-age; pop rock; art pop
- Length: 53:37
- Labels: Bearsville; Rhino
- Producer: Todd Rundgren

Todd Rundgren chronology
| Back to the Bars (1978) | Healing (1981) | The Ever Popular Tortured Artist Effect (1982) |

Singles from Healing
- 1. "Time Heals" Released: February 1981; 2. "Compassion" Released: August 1981

Professional ratings
Review scores
| Source | Rating |
|---|---|
| AllMusic | 3/5 stars |
| Rolling Stone | 4/5 stars |

Healing is the ninth studio album by American musician Todd Rundgren, released on January 28, 1981, by Bearsville Records. The album's themes are spirituality and the human condition, something Rundgren had touched on many times in earlier works but never with the consistency exhibited here as every track explores a different aspect. The back cover image of the album (artwork by Prairie Prince) shows the caduceus and a Qabalistic Tree of Life each overlaid by a treble clef (Which is reversed for the Tree of Life), reflecting Rundgren's linking of his spirituality and music.

The original vinyl release includes a bonus 7-inch 33 rpm single featuring the tracks "Time Heals" and "Tiny Demons" which are unlisted on the album sleeve but are included at the end of the later CD release as tracks 10 and 11. "Tiny Demons" was used in the Miami Vice season 1 episode "Little Prince" during a scene with a strung out heroin user.

"Time Heals" and "Compassion" were both released as singles and a promotional video was made for the former, which was the eighth music video to air on MTV during its launch on August 1, 1981.

== Live performance ==
In September 2010, Rundgren performed his Todd and Healing albums live for the first time in Akron, Ohio, followed by concerts in Muskegon MI, Indianapolis IN, St. Louis MO, Glenside PA, and Morristown NJ. Whereas the original Healing album had been entirely performed by Rundgren in the studio, the live performances featured the same band as for the Todd shows: Jesse Gress, Greg Hawkes, Prairie Prince, Bobby Strickland, and Kasim Sulton. Led by choirmaster Dirk Hillyer, local choirs from near each venue joined the band during parts of the Healing set. Large LED display and lasers were on display throughout the shows with Rundgren and the band dressed in extravagant costumes. The shows have been released on DVD.

== Track listing ==
All tracks are written by Todd Rundgren.

Side one
| No. | Title | Length |
|---|---|---|
| 1. | "Healer" | 3:40 |
| 2. | "Pulse" | 3:07 |
| 3. | "Flesh" | 3:58 |
| 4. | "Golden Goose" | 3:16 |
| 5. | "Compassion" | 4:43 |
| 6. | "Shine" | 8:12 |

Side two
| No. | Title | Length |
|---|---|---|
| 7. | "Healing, Part I" | 7:28 |
| 8. | "Healing, Part II" | 7:52 |
| 9. | "Healing, Part III" | 4:40 |

Bonus 7" 33 rpm single
| No. | Title | Length |
|---|---|---|
| 10. | "Time Heals" | 3:33 |
| 11. | "Tiny Demons" | 3:08 |
| Total length: | | 53:37 |

On some LP releases, "Time Heals" and "Tiny Demons" have been added to the end of the second side.

== Personnel ==
- Todd Rundgren – all vocals and instruments

=== Technical ===
- Produced and engineered by Todd Rundgren
- Additional engineering – Bean
- Artwork – Prairie Prince

== Charts ==
Album

| Year | Chart | Position |
|---|---|---|
| 1981 | US Billboard Pop Albums | 48 |

Single

| Year | Single | Chart | Position |
|---|---|---|---|
| 1981 | "Time Heals" | Billboard Pop Singles | 107 |
| 1981 | "Time Heals" | Billboard Mainstream Rock | 18 |
| 1981 | "Compassion" | Billboard Mainstream Rock | 48 |

== Formats ==
- Vinyl LP
- Cassette
- 8 Track Tape
- Compact Disc
