= A Cappella (Todd Rundgren album) =

Studio album by Todd Rundgren
- Released: September 1985
- Studio: Utopia Sound (Lake Hill)
- Genres: Art pop; a cappella
- Length: 39:42
- Label: Warner Bros./Rhino
- Producer: Todd Rundgren

Todd Rundgren chronology
The Ever Popular Tortured Artist Effect (1982)	A Cappella (1985)	Nearly Human (1989)

Singles from A Cappella
- 1. "Something To Fall Back On" Released: October 1985; 2. "Johnee Jingo (UK)" Released: December 1985

Professional ratings
Review scores
Source	Rating
AllMusic	3/5 stars
Classic Rock	7/10 stars
Rolling Stone	(favourable)

A Cappella is the eleventh studio album by American musician Todd Rundgren, released in September 1985 by Warner Bros. Records. The album is one of Rundgren's most unusual in that every sound is the product of the artist's voice. Rundgren employed overdubbing techniques and an E-mu Emulator (an early sampler), electronically manipulating the sound of his voice to mimic conventional rock instruments, handclaps, and other sounds. This approach to music making was later explored by artists such as Mike Patton and Björk.

== Release ==
A Cappella was finished in 1984 and slated for release on Bearsville Records later that year. But with Bearsville's slimming artist roster and lack of successful artists, founder Albert Grossman did not want to risk releasing an album that he felt was too experimental and would not sell, so A Cappella was shelved. According to journalist Barney Hoskyns, Grossman's increasingly fractious relationship with Rundgren also factored into the decision. Bearsville filed for bankruptcy in 1985 and all of its remaining master recordings were either released through Warner Bros. or shelved altogether. Rundgren's Bearsville contract was acquired by Warner Bros. executive Mo Ostin, with Grossman (who died shortly thereafter) retaining ownership of Rundgren's publishing company.

A test pressing of A Cappella was copied and bootlegged under the title, "Runt A Cappella" (CATSVILLE TR-084). This same bootleg was also released as a high quality concert recording of an A Cappella live concert, taken from a recording at the Bismark Theater, on October 25, 1985, that was broadcast via the King Biscuit Flower Hour. The packaging of both bootlegs were the same, so it was unknown whether it was the studio LP or live LP until it was played.

A Cappella would also be Rundgren's first official album for Warner Bros. Records, following the demise of Bearsville Records, which Warner Bros. distributed. Rhino Records would subsequently acquire the rights to the album for release on CD and for online distribution. Following its release, Rundgren put his solo career on hold and would not release another studio album until 1989.

In 1985, Warner Bros. released "Something to Fall Back On" as a single in the United States. Cashbox reviewed the single during the week of December 7, 1985, referring to it as a "curiosity" that "stands on its own as a fine bit of shimmering pop". The following month, the song was released in the United Kingdom. All editions of the single contained Lockjaw as the B-side, with the twelve-inch single also including a dance mix of "Something to Fall Back On". Music Week reviewed the single that same month, calling it a "bright poppy number [that] follows closely on from his duet with Bonnie Tyler."

== Track listing ==
All tracks are written by Todd Rundgren, except where noted.

Side one
No.	Title	Length
1.	"Blue Orpheus"	5:02
2.	"Johnee Jingo"	3:51
3.	"Pretending to Care"	3:40
4.	"Hodja"	3:25
5.	"Lost Horizon"	4:57

Side two
No.	Title	Writer(s)	Length
6.	"Something to Fall Back On"		4:13
7.	"Miracle in the Bazaar"		4:12
8.	"Lockjaw"		4:01
9.	"Honest Work"		2:40
10.	"Mighty Love"	Joseph B. Jefferson; Bruce Hawes; Charles Simmons	3:41
Total length:			39:42

== Personnel ==
- Todd Rundgren – all vocals and sounds (E-mu Emulator)

=== Technical ===
- Produced and engineered by Todd Rundgren
- Mastered by Greg Calbi at Sterling Sound (New York, NY)
- Photography – Lynn Goldsmith/L.G.I.
- Art direction – Todd Rundgren
- Layout – Barry Feinstein
- Art assembly – Gabrielle Raumberger

== Charts ==
Album

Year	Chart	Position
1985	US Billboard Pop Albums	128

== Cover versions and samples ==
- British Asian musician Kindness sampled "Pretending to Care" on their song "Cry Everything" on their 2019 album Something Like a War.
- American singer Jennifer Warnes covered "Pretending to Care" on her 1992 album The Hunter, which reached No. 13 on the Billboard Adult Contemporary chart. The song was also covered by Australian singer Daryl Braithwaite on his 1988 album Edge. Both versions featured traditional instrumentation. Singer (and Manhattan Transfer member) Janis Siegel also recorded the song for her 1989 album Short Stories, a collaboration with pianist Fred Hersch.
- Guitarist Paul Gilbert covered "Blue Orpheus" on his 2010 album Fuzz Universe.
- "Honest Work" has been covered by several Irish vocal acts, including Beyond the Pale, Cloudstreet, Pat Sheridan, and Maddy Prior.
- "Hodja" was performed on the first season of the television series, Full House, and was sung by Jesse Cochran (John Stamos), along with his group of friends, The Rippers.
- "Johnee Jingo" has been sampled on hip-hop songs "Drinks Up!" by Madlib and "Earl Flinn" by Slum Village, from the albums WLIB AM: King of the Wigflip and Villa Manifesto respectively.
- "Lost Horizon" was later sampled by Rundgren himself for his track "No World Order" in 1993.
