= Bang the Drum All Day =

- U.S. release

Single by Todd Rundgren

from the album The Ever Popular Tortured Artist Effect
- B-side: "Chant" (US); "Drive" (UK)
- Released: April 1983
- Recorded: 1982 at Utopia Sound Studios
- Genre: Pop rock; ska; novelty
- Length: 3:38
- Label: Bearsville
- Songwriter: Todd Rundgren
- Producer: Todd Rundgren

Todd Rundgren singles chronology
"Feet Don't Fail Me Now" (1982)	"Bang the Drum All Day" (1983)	"Loving You's a Dirty Job but Somebody's Gotta Do It" (1986)

"Bang the Drum All Day" is a song from Todd Rundgren's 1982 album The Ever Popular Tortured Artist Effect, released as a single in April 1983. The lyrics describe, in the first person, the narrator's drive to play drums or improvised percussion to the exclusion of other activities such as work, play or education. All the instruments on this track are performed by Rundgren.

Rundgren would re-record the song live for subscribers to his PatroNet service. The new version was retitled "Bang on the Ukulele Daily", referring to Rundgren's decision to perform it in a Hawaiian style, accompanied only by a ukulele. "Bang on the Ukulele Daily" was included on his album One Long Year.

The song has become popular as an anti-work anthem or anthem of celebration.

== In popular culture ==
The song is played in Lambeau Field after the Green Bay Packers score a touchdown. A tradition that officially started in 1995, the song has become an iconic part of the Packers fan experience and is an unofficial Wisconsin celebratory anthem.

Other sports teams have followed suit. It was similarly used by the Cincinnati Bengals in the early 2000s and brought back in 2017 as well as by the Indianapolis Colts until being replaced by The Black Keys' "Gold on the Ceiling". The St. Louis Rams also used the song as touchdown celebration music during home games played at the TWA Dome during their Super Bowl-winning 1999 season. In addition to being a touchdown song, the song was used as the goal song for the Edmonton Road Runners during the 2004-05 AHL season whenever they scored a goal at home in Rexall Place.

== Chart positions ==
Chart (1983)	Peak position
UK Singles (OCC)	86
US Billboard Hot 100	63
US Mainstream Rock (Billboard)	29
