= Nazz =

American rock band (1967–1969)

- Nazz in 1968. Left to right: Carson Van Osten, Stewkey, Todd Rundgren, Thom Mooney.

Background information
- Origin: Philadelphia, Pennsylvania, U.S.
- Genres: Psychedelic rock; garage rock; power pop
- Years active: 1967–1969
- Label: SGC
- Past members: Todd Rundgren; Carson Van Osten; Thom Mooney; Stewkey

The Nazz was an American rock band formed in Philadelphia in 1967. The group was founded by guitarist and main songwriter Todd Rundgren and bassist Carson Van Osten. Drummer Thom Mooney and vocalist/keyboardist Robert "Stewkey" Antoni joined soon after. The group is best known for their debut single "Open My Eyes”, and "Hello It's Me".

During 1968 and 1969, the Nazz released two albums (Nazz and Nazz Nazz). Following the group's disbandment in 1969, a collection of archival recordings was compiled and released under the title Nazz III. Rundgren later re-recorded a solo version of "Hello It's Me" that reached number 5 on the U.S. charts.

== History ==
=== Name and formation ===
Nazz was formed in Philadelphia in 1967. Vocalist/keyboardist Robert Antoni performed and recorded under the mononym Stewkey, which he said was a nickname he earned because he "was always stewed".

The band took its name from The Yardbirds' 1966 song "The Nazz Are Blue". There also exists a 1952 monologue, "The Nazz", by the American Beatnik comedian Lord Buckley, but Rundgren has said that none of the band members were aware of this.

The band's official name on all records and press materials is simply "Nazz", without the definite article. However, the group also sometimes called themselves "the Nazz". Rundgren stated that "We were formed in the late sixties, so most every band was the something. It was always 'the This' or 'the That,' so we were looking for something kind of simple and iconographic, I guess." In the song "Loosen Up", a member introduces the group as "the Nazz, from Philadelphia." Conversely, in a 2019 interview, Mooney and Antoni stated that "Nazz" had always been the correct name.

The group's original managers Jack Warfield and Jerry Bartoff owned a record store in downtown Philadelphia, and the band first rehearsed in a storage room above the record store. The group's first major concert had them opening for the Doors on June 18, 1967.

In Phoenix, Arizona, another band called Nazz was formed at about the same time that Nazz was formed in Philadelphia. This group released only one single before moving to Los Angeles and renaming themselves Alice Cooper.

=== Nazz ===
"Open My Eyes" (1967)
Excerpt from the debut record by Nazz.

The Nazz were approached at a Holiday Inn bar by manager/publicist John Kurland, who was looking for an act to manage and thought they looked like a band. After hearing them play in their space above the record shop, Kurland bargained with Warfield and Bartoff to buy the Nazz out. Kurland and his assistant Michael Friedman marketed the Nazz in a teen magazine along with bands like the Monkees. However, the band preferred the heavier rock sounds of The Who and Cream. Since they actually played in both styles there may have been some conflict among fans about their image.

The band members often complained that Kurland restricted the number of concerts they played; Thom Mooney said in a late 1968 interview that "We haven't played a lot of dates yet, as our management didn't want us overexposed." In a 2019 interview, however, Mooney challenged this complaint by the band, saying that they did have a reasonably loaded tour schedule and that the only reason management did not book them at more shows was because they could not play at bars, being underage.

The group signed with SGC Records, which released Nazz in October 1968. There was talk of putting the album out on the Colgems label, but the band objected to this as they did not want to be seen as another Monkees, who recorded for Colgems.

=== Nazz Nazz and Nazz III ===
An attempt at recording in England in January 1969 was cut short when the Musicians' Union found they had not obtained proper permission to record in the country, though before returning to the United States the Nazz did a shopping spree to update their wardrobe, building their definitive look. The Nazz then recorded their second album in Los Angeles in late 1968 and early 1969. Sources have claimed the album was originally called "Fungo Bat", but Rundgren, Stewkey, and Mooney have all said "Fungo Bat" was just a working title. (A fungo bat is a special baseball bat used only for practice; it is not intended to hit pitched balls.)

Due to tensions which emerged during the recording of the album, Van Osten left shortly after it was completed. The Nazz then played a few shows as a trio, with temporary bassists filling Van Osten's slot, before Rundgren quit as well. At this point, the Nazz's second album had still yet to be released. At Stewkey and Mooney's request, the planned double album was shortened to a single LP before being released as Nazz Nazz in May 1969. Much of what was cut was piano-based Rundgren material, influenced by singer/songwriter Laura Nyro - a far cry from the group's original Beatles-Who-Yardbirds-Cream derived sound. For a short time the Nazz continued as a duo, touring with support musicians now covering for both Rundgren and Van Osten, before formally dissolving.

In a 2002 interview Rundgren said of the Nazz's career: "It was brief and very intense. I've made peace with it, but a lot of potential was wasted. I don't really blame any single person for that. I had a hard time focusing on the band, I continued to develop myself as a songwriter and a performer. Eventually everyone would feel like a backup band - I was writing the songs, producing the records. As time went on my presence was bound to distort the thing."

Nazz III was released in May 1971, over a year after the break-up. It consists primarily of material that was cut from the second album.

== Solo careers and legacy ==
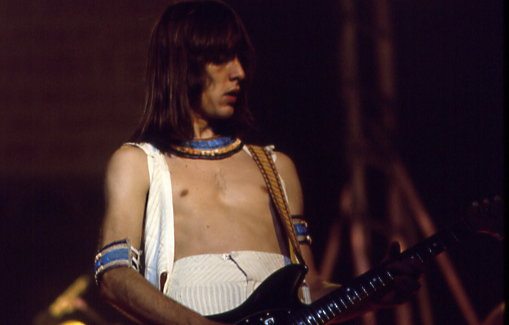
Todd Rundgren, mid-1970s

Rundgren had a successful career as a solo artist and with the band Utopia. His biggest solo hit was an up-tempo version of "Hello It's Me", from his 1972 Something/Anything? album, which peaked at #5 on the Billboard Hot 100 on 22 December 1973.

Van Osten largely dropped out of music, and worked for decades with The Walt Disney Company producing comic books and other media.

Stewkey and Mooney reconnected and played with Fuse for a brief period using two names, Fuse or Nazz, depending on where they were gigging. Mooney would leave again, and Fuse evolved into "Sick Man of Europe", and later (without Stewkey) Cheap Trick.

The Nazz proved influential on the emerging genre dubbed power pop, which featured melodic pop songwriting with a more aggressive performance style. They gained wider recognition thanks to the inclusion of "Open My Eyes" on Nuggets (1972), an anthology of American 1960s garage punk and psychedelia compiled by musician Lenny Kaye. The three Nazz LPs were reissued by Rhino Records on LP in 1983 and subsequently on CD with bonus demo and outtake tracks. In 2009, Spectra Records released three albums by Nazz. They were Nazz vs. Toddzila, 13th and Pine, (compilation) and Hello It's Crazy Me.

In 2011, the Bangles recorded "Open My Eyes" on their album Sweetheart of the Sun. The next year, King Gizzard & the Lizard Wizard also recorded a cover of the song, for the Nuggets: Antipodean Interpolations of the First Psychedelic Era compilation.

== In popular culture ==
- "Open My Eyes" and "Wildwood Blues" by the Nazz are featured on the soundtrack of The Mad Room, a 1969 horror movie directed by Bernard Girard.

== Members ==
- Todd Rundgren – guitar, backing and lead vocals, keyboards
- Carson Van Osten – bass guitar, backing vocals (died December 22, 2015)
- Stewkey – lead and backing vocals, keyboards (died October 9, 2023)
- Thom Mooney – drums, occasional backing vocals, percussion

== Discography ==
=== Studio albums ===
Year	Information
1968	Nazz: Released: October 1968; Label: SGC Records – SD 5001; Reissued by Rhino – 1983 (LP/Cassette) & 1988 (CD)
1969	Nazz Nazz: Released: May 1969; Label: SGC Records – SD 5002; Reissued by Rhino – 1983 (LP/Cassette) & 1988 (CD)
1971	Nazz III: Released: July 11, 1971; Label: SGC Records – SD 5004; Reissued by Rhino – 1983 (LP/Cassette) & 1988 (CD)

=== Compilation albums ===
Year	Information
1984	Best of Nazz: Label: Rhino – RNLP/RNC 116 – 1984 (LP/Cassette) / R1-70116 1989 (CD)
1998	Thirteenth and Pine: Label: Distortion Records
2002	Open Our Eyes: The Anthology: Label: Sanctuary Records
2006	Nazz Nazz – Including Nazz III – The Fungo Bat Sessions: Label: Castle Music; Contains both Nazz Nazz and Nazz III albums on 2 CDs and many unreleased tracks

=== Singles ===
Year	Title	Chart positions		Album
Year	Title	US Billboard Hot 100	CA RPM Charts	Album
1968	"Open My Eyes"	112	–	Nazz
1969	"Hello It's Me"	66	41	Nazz
1969	"Not Wrong Long"	–	90	Nazz Nazz
1969	"Some People"	–	–	Nazz III
