= White Knight (album) =

Studio album by Todd Rundgren
- Released: May 12, 2017
- Recorded: 2016–2017
- Genre: Rock
- Length: 52:38; 41:40 (vinyl)
- Label: Cleopatra
- Producer: Todd Rundgren

Todd Rundgren chronology
Runddans (2015)	White Knight (2017)	Space Force (2022)

White Knight is the twenty-fifth studio album by American musician Todd Rundgren, released on May 12, 2017 by Cleopatra Records.

== Critical reception ==
Professional ratings
Aggregate scores
Source	Rating
Metacritic	60/100
Review scores
Source	Rating
AllMusic	3/5 stars
American Songwriter	2.5/5 stars
The A.V. Club	C
Pitchfork	6.6/10
Rolling Stone	3/5 stars
The Spill Magazine	4.5/5 stars

White Knight received generally mixed reviews from critics. At Metacritic, which assigns a normalized rating out of 100 to reviews from mainstream publications, the album received an average score of 60, based on 6 reviews.

== Track listing ==
All tracks are written by Todd Rundgren and the featured artists.

No.	Title	Length
1.	"Come"	4:07
2.	"I Got Your Back" (featuring KK Watson and Dâm-Funk)	3:38
3.	"Chance for Us" (featuring Daryl Hall and Bobby Strickland)	4:14
4.	"Fiction"	3:41
5.	"Beginning (Of the End)" (featuring John Boutté)	3:55
6.	"Tin Foil Hat" (featuring Donald Fagen)	3:23
7.	"Look at Me" (featuring Michael Holman)	3:08
8.	"Let's Do This" (featuring Moe Berg)	3:07
9.	"Sleep" (featuring Joe Walsh)	2:52
10.	"That Could Have Been Me" (featuring Robyn)	3:18
11.	"Deaf Ears" (featuring Trent Reznor and Atticus Ross)	2:58
12.	"Naked & Afraid" (featuring Bettye LaVette)	3:57
13.	"Buy My T"	3:10
14.	"Wouldn't You Like to Know" (featuring Rebop Rundgren)	3:53
15.	"This Is Not a Drill" (featuring Joe Satriani, Kasim Sulton and Prairie Prince)	3:17

First edition vinyl version of the album lacks tracks 7, 12, and 14. Cleopatra records re issued the LP in 2022 as a 2 LP set on silver vinyl that includes all songs plus a remix of "I got your back(DaM-Funk Re-Freak)" and "Deaf Ears (Nine Inch Nails Mix)"
