= No World Order =

- The first release of 'No World Order', as the experimental interactive release.

Studio album by TR-i
- Released: July 6, 1993; June 7, 1994
- Genres: Rock; electronica; hip hop
- Length: 53:14
- Labels: Rhino/Forward; Alchemedia (No World Order Lite)
- Producer: Todd Rundgren

TR-i chronology
| 2nd Wind (1991) | No World Order (1993) | The Individualist (1995) |

No World Order - Lite
- The later-released album running order edition, re-branded as 'No World Order - Lite'.

Professional ratings
Review scores
| Source | Rating |
|---|---|
| AllMusic | 1.5/5 stars |
| Classic Rock | 7/10 stars |

No World Order is the fourteenth studio album by American musician Todd Rundgren, credited as TR-i. It was released on July 6, 1993, for the Philips CD-i, making it the first interactive music CD-ROM in history. Its music was heavily influenced by electronica and rap.

== Interactive release ==
This CD-only recording was available in an interactive version on Philips' short-lived CD-i format, as well as the Macintosh and Windows operating systems. The interactive version included the ability to alter the playback of the music by selecting a pre-determined sequence by either Rundgren or one of his four guest producers - Don Was, Jerry Harrison, Hal Willner and Bob Clearmountain. The interface allowed the listener to control various aspects of music playback. If the user did nothing, the Rundgren mix would start and play through to the end.

The interactive interface presented standard playback controls and the following major functions, plus a help function:

- Program

(TR-i, Hal Willner, Bob Clearmountain, Jerry Harrison, Don Was)

- Direction

(Very Fast Forward, Fast Forward, Forward, Hold, Reverse)

- Form

(Creative, Standard, Conservative)

- Tempo

(Fastest 132 BPM, Faster 126 BPM, Fast 120 BPM, Medium 110 BPM, Slow 100 BPM, Slower 92 BPM, Slowest 96 BPM)

- Mood

(Bright, Happy, Thoughtful, Sad, Dark)

- Mix

(Karaoke, Thick, Natural, Spacious, Sparse)

- Video

(Blank, Warp, Swarm, Title, Editor)

The material on the disc was 933 4-bar musical segments. Each was a portion of one of the songs, accompanied by metadata describing the character of the segment - tempo in BPM, mood, chorus or verse, etc. Each segment was available in multiple mixes as well, from instrumental to a cappella. As the listener adjusted parameters, the currently playing segment would finish before starting a new segment, ensuring a seamless listening experience.

The interface had the unique (at the time) property of allowing the user to select a range rather than a single value when adjusting a parameter. One could select a fast tempo, reducing the range so only that fast tempo segments were played, or increase the range so medium to fast were played, weighting towards fast.

Rundgren demonstrated No World Order and the Philips CD-i system at record stores and electronics retailers after the release of the disc, and can be found on YouTube: Part 1 and Part 2.

The tour for the album was designed to maximize interactivity with the audience, allowing members to dance on a raised portion of the stage, and even to guest solo on guitar. Rundgren was the only performer on this tour apart from three female dancers.

The interactive program received "Best Composition/Arrangement" from the Academy of Interactive Arts & Sciences, and the "Best Interactive Disc of the Year" Award from Video magazine. The editors of Electronic Entertainment presented it with their 1993 "Breakthrough Multimedia Title" award, and praised it as "a preview of a new kind of musical medium."

== Standard CD release ==
A non-interactive, audio-only CD was released simultaneously with Rundgren's preferred sequence. Even this version, however, played on the theme of interactivity and lack of order: its nearly continuous flow supported random play, and its paper insert could be refolded and reinserted so as to display any of 16 alternate versions of the cover art.

Another version of the album, No World Order Lite, was released the following year (1994), presenting the same material in a more song-oriented format.

In Japan a promotional disc, NWO (Version 1.01), was released that contains alternate versions of "Fascist Christ," "Property," "Day Job," and "Fever Broke."

An "expanded edition" reissue compiling all of the previous versions, plus four bonus tracks, was released by Esoteric/Cherry Red Records on November 8, 2011. On digital platforms such as Apple Music and Spotify, "Day Job [Club Version]" is missing from this reissue even though its title is included in the track listing; ten tracks on "disc two" are mislabeled, starting with "Proactivity," which is actually "Time Stood Still," and ending with "Day Job [Club Version]," which is "Property [Lost Version]."

A limited-edition DVD of the 1993-'94 "World (No Order) Tour" was issued by Toddstore in 2014. It includes a range of bonus video from the era, including footage of a CD-i demonstration by Rundgren at Tower Records in Chicago and two interviews from the period with Indianapolis TV journalist Ken Owen.

== Track listing ==
All songs by Todd Rundgren

=== No World Order ===
1. "Worldwide Epiphany 1.0"
2. "No World Order 1.0"
3. "Worldwide Epiphany 1.1"
4. "Day Job 1.0"
5. "Property 1.0"
6. "Fascist Christ 1.0"
7. "Love Thing 1.0"
8. "Time Stood Still 1.0"
9. "Proactivity 1.0"
10. "No World Order 1.1"
11. "Worldwide Epiphany 1.2"
12. "Time Stood Still 1.1"
13. "Love Thing 1.0"
14. "Time Stood Still 1.2"
15. "Word Made Flesh 1.0"
16. "Fever Broke"

=== NWO (Version 1.01) (1993) ===
1. "Fascist Christ (Fax Version)"
2. "Property (Video Version)"
3. "Day Job (Radio Version)"
4. "Fascist Christ (Radio Version)"
5. "Fever Broke (Xaos Version)"
6. "Property (Lost Version)"
7. "Day Job (Club Version)"
8. "Fascist Christ (Broken Version)"

=== No World Order Lite ===
1. "Worldwide Epiphany"
2. "Love Thing"
3. "Property"
4. "Day Job"
5. "Fascist Christ"
6. "No World Order"
7. "Time Stood Still"
8. "Proactivity"
9. "Word Made Flesh"
10. "Fever Broke"

=== No World Order: Expanded Edition ===
Disc 1 (Original version)

1. "Worldwide Epiphany 1.0"
2. "No World Order 1.0"
3. "Worldwide Epiphany 1.1"
4. "Day Job 1.0"
5. "Property 1.0"
6. "Fascist Christ 1.0"
7. "Love Thing 1.0"
8. "Time Stood Still 1.0"
9. "Proactivity 1.0"
10. "No World Order 1.1"
11. "Worldwide Epiphany 1.2"
12. "Time Stood Still 1.1"
13. "Love Thing 1.1"
14. "Time Stood Still 1.2"
15. "Word Made Flesh 1.0"
16. "Fever Broke"
17. "Day Job (US Club Version)" °
18. "No World Order (Yokohama Morning Version)" °
19. "Day Job (US Radio Version)" °

Disc 2 ("Lite" and "1.01" versions)

1. "Worldwide Epiphany"
2. "Love Thing"
3. "Property"
4. "Day Job"
5. "Fascist Christ"
6. "No World Order"
7. "Time Stood Still"
8. "Proactivity"
9. "Word Made Flesh"
10. "Fever Broke"
11. "Fascist Christ (Fax Version)"
12. "Property (Video Version)"
13. "Day Job (Radio Version)"
14. "Fascist Christ (Radio Version)"
15. "Fever Broke (Xaos Version)"
16. "Property (Lost Version)"
17. "Day Job (Club Version)"
18. "Fascist Christ (Broken Version)"
19. "No World Order (Yokohama Night Version)" °

° denotes bonus tracks

== Personnel ==
- Todd Rundgren - all vocals and instruments, producer
