= One Long Year =

Album

Studio album / Compilation album by Todd Rundgren
- Released: June 20, 2000
- Recorded: 1999–2000
- Genres: Pop rock; art rock; industrial rock
- Length: 42:43
- Labels: Artemis; Sheridan Square
- Producer: Todd Rundgren

Todd Rundgren chronology
With a Twist... (1997)	One Long Year (2000)	Liars (2004)

Professional ratings
Review scores
Source	Rating
AllMusic	3/5 stars
Classic Rock	6/10 stars

One Long Year is the seventeenth studio album by American musician Todd Rundgren, released on June 20, 2000. It is composed of recordings that were released initially only to subscribers to Rundgren's online PatroNet facility, as well as other miscellany. To promote the album, Rundgren performed "I Hate My Frickin' I.S.P." on Late Night with Conan O'Brien.

== Track listing ==
All tracks are written by Todd Rundgren.

1. "I Hate My Frickin' I.S.P." - 3:47
2. "Buffalo Grass" - 4:32
3. "Jerk" - 4:40
4. "Bang on the Ukulele Daily" (live) - 3:05
5. "Where Does the Time Go?" - 4:48
6. "Love of the Common Man" - 3:28
7. "Mary and the Holy Ghost" - 4:22
8. "Yer Fast (And I Like It)" - 3:15
9. "Hit Me Like a Train" - 5:02
10. "The Surf Talks" - 5:49

== Personnel ==
Credits adapted from the CD liner notes.

- Todd Rundgren - all vocals and instruments (except where noted), producer, engineer

Additional musicians

- Jesse Gress - guitar (6)
- Kasim Sulton - bass (6)
- John Ferenzik - keyboards (6)
- Prairie Prince - drums (6)
- Ken Emerson - guitar (9)
