= Space Force (album) =

Studio album by Todd Rundgren
- Released: October 14, 2022
- Recorded: 2020–2021
- Genre: Rock
- Length: 48:49
- Label: Cleopatra
- Producer: Todd Rundgren

Todd Rundgren chronology
White Knight (2017)	Space Force (2022)

Singles from Space Force
- 1. "Espionage" Released: September 8, 2020; 2. "Down with the Ship" Released: October 9, 2020; 3. "Your Fandango" Released: April 3, 2021; 4. "Godiva Girl" Released: October 19, 2021; 5. "Puzzle" Released: August 17, 2022; 6. "I'm Not Your Dog" Released: October 5, 2022

Space Force is the twenty-sixth studio album by American musician Todd Rundgren, released on October 14, 2022 by Cleopatra Records. Originally planned for a 2021 release, Rundgren stated the delay was due to Cleopatra Records' physical media release strategy. Cleopatra released a Cassette Tape as well as 6 different colors of vinyl(Grey, Clear, Red, Green, Blue and Yellow) which likely contributed to the delays

== Track listing ==
All tracks co-written by Todd Rundgren.

No.	Title	Length
1.	"Puzzle" (with Adrian Belew)	4:48
2.	"Down with the Ship" (with Rivers Cuomo)	2:56
3.	"Artist in Residence" (with Neil Finn)	3:12
4.	"Godiva Girl" (with The Roots)	4:20
5.	"Your Fandango" (with Sparks)	4:24
6.	"Someday" (with Davey Lane)	3:00
7.	"I'm Not Your Dog" (with Thomas Dolby)	5:49
8.	"Espionage" (with Narcy)	5:02
9.	"STFU" (with Rick Nielsen)	3:17
10.	"Head in the Ocean" (with Alfie Templeman)	3:29
11.	"I'm Leaving" (with The Lemon Twigs)	2:57
12.	"Eco Warrior Goddess" (with Steve Vai)	5:31
Total length:		48:49
