= Carson Van Osten =

American comics creator and musician

- Born: September 24, 1945 Philadelphia, Pennsylvania, U.S.
- Died: December 22, 2015 (aged 70) Thousand Oaks, California, U.S.
- Areas: Artist; Writer; Animator

Carson Van Osten (September 24, 1945 – December 22, 2015) was an American comics creator and musician.

== Early life ==
Van Osten studied at the Philadelphia College of Art.

== Career ==
=== Music ===
In 1966, he played in the band Woody's Truck Stop, before forming the rock group Nazz with Todd Rundgren and Thom Mooney in 1967. Van Osten was the band's bass guitarist. He quit Nazz in 1969.

=== Comics ===
Later, Van Osten became a writer and artist of Disney comics. From 1969 to 1976, he created Mickey Mouse and Goofy comics for the publisher Disney Studio, which produced comics for the European market. Starting in 1976, he was art director for Disney's comic strips department in the 1980s. After that, he sporadically worked on new Disney comics, including some covers and the adaptation of the Atlantis: The Lost Empire film. He also created The Wuzzles for Disney Television Animation which was based on an idea pitched by then Disney CEO Michael Eisner.

On August 7, 2015, Van Osten was one of 10 individuals who were honored with a Disney Legends award.

=== Model railroading ===
Van Osten created an N scale model railroad, the Rio Poco, that was featured in the June 1991 issue of Model Railroader magazine. The layout was influenced by fellow Disney employee John Olson.

== Death ==
He died on December 22, 2015, at the age of 70.
