= Liars (Todd Rundgren album) =

Studio album by Todd Rundgren
- Released: April 6, 2004
- Genres: Rock; pop rock; electronica
- Length: 73:28
- Label: Sanctuary
- Producer: Todd Rundgren

Todd Rundgren chronology
One Long Year (2000)	Liars (2004)	Arena (2008)

Singles from Liars
- 1. "Soul Brother" Released: 2004

Professional ratings
Review scores
Source	Rating
allmusic	4/5 stars
Rolling Stone	(Not rated)
Tiny Mix Tapes	2/5 stars
PopMatters	(Not rated)

Liars is the eighteenth studio album by American musician Todd Rundgren, released on April 6, 2004 by Sanctuary Records. After a long period of experimentation with multimedia technology and late 20th century musical genres, Rundgren seemed to once again embrace the eclectic pop sensibilities that made him famous, as on his most well-known album, Something/Anything? As a result, the album received rave reviews, as many considered it a welcome return to form.

Lyrically, every song deals in some way with the issue of truth - focusing more on half-truths than outright lies. From the liner notes:

"All of these songs are about a paucity of truth. At first they may seem to be about other things, but that is just a reflection of how much dishonesty we have accepted in our daily lives. We are raised from birth to believe things that cannot be proven or that are plainly not true. People will often brag of their honesty, when there is so much they have simply chosen to ignore or leave unexamined.
The fact is, we are terrified of the truth."

== Mixes ==
Upon release, the album was pressed onto vinyl. The vinyl running order was mixed as separate tracks to fit the vinyl discs with ease. This version included the songs with clean intros and fade-outs. This master was also used for the Japanese release on CD, whereas every other standard release contained the intended, flowing running order.

== Track listing ==
All tracks are written by Todd Rundgren.

1. "Truth" – 5:12
2. "Sweet" – 5:51
3. "Happy Anniversary" – 4:24
4. "Soul Brother" – 4:14
5. "Stood Up" – 4:42
6. "Mammon" – 4:53
7. "Future" – 6:04
8. "Past" – 5:55
9. "Wondering" – 5:11
10. "Flaw" – 4:42
11. "Afterlife" – 3:56
12. "Living" – 5:37
13. "God Said" – 7:40
14. "Liar" – 5:07

== Personnel ==
Adapted from the CD liner notes.

- Todd Rundgren – all vocals and instruments (except where noted), producer, engineer

Additional musicians

- Ken Emerson – slide guitar (3)
- Garn Ian Thomasson – wind (4)
