= Hello It's Me =

1968 single by Nazz

"Hello It’s Me"
- UK single label

Single by Nazz

from the album Nazz
- A-side: "Open My Eyes"
- Released: July 1968
- Recorded: April 1968
- Studio: I. D. Sound Studios, Hollywood, California
- Genre: Pop
- Length: 3:57
- Label: SGC
- Songwriter: Todd Rundgren
- Producers: Michael Friedman; Nazz

Nazz singles chronology
"Open My Eyes" (1968)	"Hello It’s Me" (1968)	"Not Wrong Long" (1969)

"Hello It's Me" is a song written by American musician Todd Rundgren. It was the first song he wrote, and was recorded by his group Nazz as a slow ballad, released as the B-side of the band's first single, "Open My Eyes", in 1968. A mid-tempo version, recorded for Rundgren's 1972 solo album Something/Anything?, was issued as a single in 1973, reaching No. 5 on the Billboard Hot 100 chart.

== History ==
"Hello It's Me" was the first song written by Todd Rundgren. Written in 1967 as a slow ballad about the breakup of a relationship, it was released in October 1968 as the B-side of his band Nazz's debut single "Open My Eyes", and included on the band's debut album Nazz (1968). Although released as a B-side, it was picked up in preference to the A-side by Boston radio station WMEX, where it rose to No. 1, and was subsequently picked up by other stations. It entered the Billboard chart in February 1969, peaking at number 71, and re-entered the charts the following January, this time peaking at number 66. In Canada, it ranked number 41 in March 1969, and number 58 in February 1970.

Rundgren's songs in this phase of his career were influenced by the work of Laura Nyro, but in a 2005 interview he said that the basic structure of the song was adapted from the introduction of a Jimmy Smith recording:

...the main influence for Hello It's Me was an eight bar intro that Jimmy Smith played on a recording of When Johnny Comes Marching Home. He had this whole sort of block chord thing that he did to set up the intro of the song. I tried to capture those changes, and those changes became what are the changes underneath Hello It's Me. I then had to come up with melody and words, but the changes are actually almost lifted literally from something that was, from Jimmy Smith's standpoint, a throwaway.

— Todd Rundgren, puremusic.com

== Todd Rundgren solo version ==
"Hello It’s Me"
- 1974 France single picture sleeve

Single by Todd Rundgren

from the album Something/Anything?
- B-side: "Cold Morning Light"
- Released: November 1972 (1st release); August 1973 (2nd release)
- Recorded: 1971
- Studio: The Record Plant, New York City
- Genre: Soft rock; pop; soul; blue-eyed soul
- Length: 3:31 (single); 4:42 (album)
- Label: Bearsville
- Songwriter: Todd Rundgren
- Producer: Todd Rundgren

Todd Rundgren singles chronology
"Couldn't I Just Tell You" (1972)	"Hello It’s Me" (1972)	"A Dream Goes On Forever" (1974)

Rundgren recorded a more midtempo version of "Hello It's Me" for his 1972 solo album Something/Anything? It was released twice as a single, with the second issue in 1973 becoming Rundgren's only top ten pop hit, reaching No. 5 on the Hot 100. It also reached No. 17 on the Adult Contemporary chart.

=== Personnel ===
- Todd Rundgren – lead vocals, piano
- Mark "Moogy" Klingman – organ
- John Siomos – drums
- Stu Woods – bass guitar
- Robbie Kogale – guitar
- Randy Brecker – trumpet
- Michael Brecker – tenor sax
- Barry Rogers – trombone
- Hope Ruff – backing vocals
- Richard Corey – backing vocals
- Allan Nicholls – backing vocals
- Vicki Robinson – backing vocals
- Dennis Cooley – backing vocals
- Cecilia Norfleet – backing vocals

== Chart history ==
=== Weekly charts ===
1973–1974 singles charts
Chart	Peak
Australia (Kent Music Report)	68
Canada RPM 100 Singles	15
Canada RPM Pop Music Playlist	9
US Billboard Hot 100	5
US Billboard Easy Listening	17
US Cash Box Top 100	2
US Record World Singles Chart	4

=== Year-end charts ===
Chart (1973)	Rank
Canada RPM Top Singles	139
U.S. Billboard Hot 100	82

Chart (1974)	Rank
U.S. Cash Box	23

== Popular culture ==
- The song was featured in Sofia Coppola's 1999 film The Virgin Suicides.
- In 2021, it was used during a pivotal scene in the series premiere of And Just Like That..., the sequel to Sex and the City. It was repeated at various points during the show's 2021–22 season.
- Rundgren's version of the song was sampled by American indie pop band TV Girl on their song "If You Want It", from their 2010 self-titled EP. The song attracted the attention of Rhino Entertainment, who issued a takedown notice on the band.

== Other versions ==
- A cover version of "Hello It's Me" was recorded by the Isley Brothers for their 1974 album Live It Up.
