= Back to the Bars =

Live album by Todd Rundgren
- Released: December 1978
- Recorded: May 10–14, 1978; May 23, 1978; August 24, 1978
- Venues: The Bottom Line (New York City); The Roxy (Los Angeles); The Agora (Cleveland)
- Genre: Rock
- Length: 103:34
- Label: Bearsville
- Producer: Todd Rundgren

Todd Rundgren chronology
Hermit of Mink Hollow (1978)	Back to the Bars (1978)	Healing (1981)

Singles from Back to the Bars
- 1. "It Wouldn't Have Made Any Difference" Released: October 1978

Back to the Bars is a live album by American rock musician Todd Rundgren, which was released as a double LP in 1978.

The album was recorded during week-long stints in New York City (The Bottom Line), Los Angeles (The Roxy), and Cleveland (The Agora). The music featured the best of Rundgren's most commercial work spanning seven of the eight solo albums released in the 1970s up to, but not including, his most recent at the time. This effort was in place of rumors of a re-release of his out-of-print first two LPs, Runt, and Runt. The Ballad of Todd Rundgren. The only offering from those were "The Range War", and the bulk of the material came from Something/Anything?, A Wizard, a True Star, Todd, Initiation, and Faithful. The finale included past and present members of Rundgren's Utopia: Roger Powell, Kasim Sulton, Willie Wilcox, John Siegler, Ralph Schuckett and Moogy Klingman. Also joining in were the Hello People: Norman Smart, Greg Geddes, Bobby Sedita, and Larry Tasse. Special guest stars were Rick Derringer, Spencer Davis, Daryl Hall, John Oates, and Stevie Nicks.

Despite a hard push to replicate the success of Frampton Comes Alive!, Back to the Bars did not generate any significant singles or lift for Rundgren.

== Track listing ==
Professional ratings
Review scores
Source	Rating
Allmusic	3/5 stars

All tracks written by Todd Rundgren; except where indicated.

Side one
No.	Title	Original release	Length
1.	"Real Man"	Initiation	4:47
2.	"Love of the Common Man"	Faithful	4:25
3.	"The Verb 'To Love'"	Faithful	8:00
4.	"Love in Action"	Oops! Wrong Planet	3:44
5.	"A Dream Goes on Forever"	Todd	2:42

Side two
No.	Title	Original release	Length
6.	"Sometimes I Don't Know What to Feel"	A Wizard, a True Star	4:13
7.	"The Range War"	Runt. The Ballad of Todd Rundgren	2:56
8.	"Black and White"	Faithful	5:34
9.	"The Last Ride"	Todd	6:03
10.	"Cliché"	Faithful	4:12
11.	"Don't You Ever Learn?"	Todd	5:53

Side three
No.	Title	Original release	Length
12.	"Never Never Land" (Adolph Green, Betty Comden, Jule Styne)	A Wizard, a True Star	2:50
13.	"Black Maria"	Something/Anything?	5:41
14.	"Zen Archer"	A Wizard, a True Star	5:43
15.	"Medley: I'm So Proud (Curtis Mayfield); Ooh Baby Baby (Al Cleveland, Renaldo Benson, Smokey Robinson); La la Means I Love You (Thom Bell, William Hart); I Saw the Light"	A Wizard, a True Star & Something/Anything?	11:09

Side four
No.	Title	Original release	Length
16.	"It Wouldn't Have Made Any Difference"	Something/Anything?	4:27
17.	"Eastern Intrigue"	Initiation	5:43
18.	"Initiation"	Initiation	6:49
19.	"Couldn't I Just Tell You"	Something/Anything?	4:05
20.	"Hello It's Me"	Something/Anything?	4:27

== Charts ==
Chart (1978/79)	Position
Australia (Kent Music Report)	99
Canada RPM Album Chart	64
Billboard Pop Albums	75

== Personnel ==
=== Musicians ===
==== Sides 1 and 4 (except "Hello It's Me") ====
- Todd Rundgren – lead vocals, guitar, piano (5)
- Utopia
  - Roger Powell – keyboards, synthesizers, backing vocals
  - Kasim Sulton – bass, backing vocals
  - John Wilcox – drums, backing vocals

==== Sides 2 and 3 ====
- Todd Rundgren – lead vocals, guitar
- Moogy Klingman – piano
- John Siegler – bass
- John Wilcox – drums, vocals
- The Hello People
  - Greg Geddes – vocals
  - Bobby Sedita – rhythm guitar, saxophone, vocals
  - N. D. Smart – drums (7), vocals
  - Larry Tasse – synthesizer, vocals

==== Guests ====
- Spencer Davis – harmonica (7)
- Ralph Schuckett – organ (15)
- Rick Derringer – guitar (20)
- Stevie Nicks – vocals (20)
- Daryl Hall – vocals (20)
- John Oates – vocals (20)
- Spencer Davis – vocals (20)
- Kasim Sulton – vocals (20)

=== Technical ===
- Produced by Todd Rundgren
- Mixed by Todd Rundgren and Tom Edmonds
- Sleeve design and photography – Hipgnosis
- Live photography – Richard Creamer, Chuck Pulin, Kevin and Michael Ricker
- Guitar technician – Rob Davis
- Liner notes – Paul Lester
