= Hermit of Mink Hollow =

Studio album by Todd Rundgren
- Released: May 1978
- Recorded: 1977–1978
- Studio: Utopia Sound (Lake Hill)
- Genre: Pop
- Length: 34:50
- Label: Bearsville
- Producer: Todd Rundgren

Todd Rundgren chronology
Faithful (1976)	Hermit of Mink Hollow (1978)	Back to the Bars (1978)

Singles from Hermit of Mink Hollow
- 1. "Can We Still Be Friends" Released: May 1978; 2. "You Cried Wolf" Released: July 1978; 3. "All The Children Sing" Released: November 24, 1978 (UK)

Hermit of Mink Hollow is the eighth studio album by American musician Todd Rundgren, released in May 1978 by Bearsville Records. All of the instruments and vocals were performed by Rundgren. He intended the songs on the album to be performed on piano with minimal arrangements, apart from the bass, drums and voices, and for the material to showcase his newly refined singing ability.

Per the title, Rundgren recorded this album at his house on Mink Hollow Road in Lake Hill, New York. At the time, he had felt that he had been a "studio hermit" working in an "insular little 24-hour-a-day think tank" and subsequently realized that "too much social interaction [had] affected [his] overall creativity." Although the album's "confessional" songs are often attributed to his recent separation from the model Bebe Buell, Rundgren denied that the songs were necessarily autobiographical.

The album was well-received by critics and fans, who viewed the record as a "return to form" and his most immediately accessible since Something/Anything? (1972). In the US, the album peaked at number 36, while single "Can We Still Be Friends" reached number 29. The song became Rundgren's most-covered, with versions by Robert Palmer, Rod Stewart, Colin Blunstone, and Mandy Moore.

== Background ==
Following the completion of Faithful (1976), Rundgren spent two months on an eastern spiritual retreat, visiting Iran, Afghanistan, India, Nepal, Sri Lanka, Bali, Thailand, Japan, and Hawaii. He also opened Utopia Sound Studios in Lake Hill, New York, just outside of Woodstock, and bought a home nearby, as well as an adjoining property to be taken over as accommodation for artists who used the studio. The Lake Hill complex on Mink Hollow Road remained Rundgren's base for the next six years.

Between Faithful and Hermit of Mink Hollow, Rundgren also recorded three albums with his band Utopia. The first, Disco Jets, was a tongue-in-cheek collection of instrumental disco tracks left unreleased until 2001. Ra (February 1977) was a concept album based on Egyptian mythology, which prefaced a lavish tour involving an extravagant stage set with a giant pyramid and Sphynx head. Oops! Wrong Planet (September 1977), recorded immediately after the tour, signaled the start of a more pop-oriented direction for the group.

By late 1977, Rundgren was in the midst of separating from then-girlfriend Bebe Buell and their infant daughter Liv. Rundgren recalled leaving his home in New York City and sequestering himself at Mink Hollow, "after I discovered that I didn't want to cohabit any longer with Bebe, in any sense of the word ... A fortunate by-product of being so out of everything all the time and always being the odd man out ... is that you have plenty of time for self-examination."

== Production and style ==
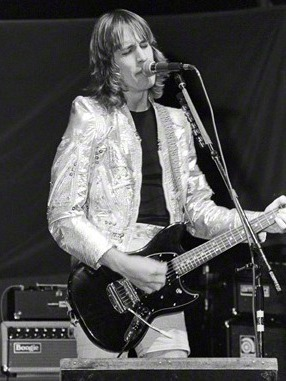
Rundgren performing with Utopia, 1978

With the exception of an occasional visit from engineer Mike Young, Rundgren recorded Hermit of Mink Hollow entirely by himself. He said that recording Mink Hollow alone was a tedious experience, "because the control room was upstairs and the drums downstairs, so when trying to record drums, if I made a mistake, I had to run up and down the stairs just to rewind the machine. I didn't have a remote with a lead that ran long enough!"

Rundgren intended the songs on the album to be performed on piano with minimal arrangements, apart from the bass, drums and voices. In that sense, he stated that the songwriting process appeared to be "fairly conventional". Most of the songs on the record did not have lyrics until completed. The writing process typically started with a rhythm track. For individual parts, he said he adopted different "personas" to suit the playing styles, such as Paul McCartney on "Determination", "where I do some of that squiggly McCartney 'Paperback Writer' stuff in the outro."

He stated that whatever concept that was behind the album's sound was limited to showcasing both his piano-based compositions and his newly refined singing ability. Daryl Hall claimed credit for influencing Rundgren's singing style after the sessions for War Babies (1974), a view supported by Utopia's Ralph Schuckett, who said: "On our tour before that [record], he never could quite cut it as a live singer. ... I think Daryl's whole thing just rubbed off on him." Rundgren disagreed as to the extent of Hall's influence, explaining "We're both still trying to emulate our common influences, the great soul singers who, in our mind, are better singers than either of us."

Mink Hollow was divided into "The Easy Side" and "The Difficult Side" because a Bearsville executive felt that the original proposed running order lacked balance. Rundgren commented in a contemporary interview: "I don't know what the fuck they were talking about. So I did it, figuring it was their particular wank and they can think what they want." Although Mink Hollow is often compared to "confessional" works such as Joni Mitchell's Blue (1971) or Bob Dylan's Blood on the Tracks (1975), Rundgren reflected that the album's songs were not necessarily autobiographical: "I wouldn't make that close a connection to my real life. Like 'Too Far Gone' wasn't directly about me leaving home as a teenager. Like most of my songs, they're only biographical to the point that other people can identify with them."

The song "Onomotoapoiea" served as comic relief for the album, being a music-hall number in a similar vein to Rundgren's "Just Another Onionhead" from A Wizard, a True Star (1972) and "An Elpee's Worth of Toons" from Todd (1974).

== Release and reception ==
Professional ratings
Review scores
Source	Rating
AllMusic	4.5/5 stars
Christgau's Record Guide	C+

Hermit of Mink Hollow was released in May 1978 with a cover that depicts a blue-tinted video screen image of Rundgren alone in his garden. In the US, the LP peaked at number 36, while single "Can We Still Be Friends" reached number 29. At the urging of Bearsville executive Paul Fishkin, Rundgren supported the record with a run of "Greatest Hits" shows held at The Bottom Line in New York and The Roxy in Los Angeles, followed by an August 23 date at the Agora Ballroom in Cleveland. The shows were recorded with select performances included for the double live album Back to the Bars (December 1978).

The album was generally well-received by critics and fans. Popularly viewed as his most immediately accessible work since Something/Anything?, it received more public attention and radio airplay than most of Rundgren's efforts since A Wizard, a True Star and was heralded as a "return to form" after a string of prog records with Utopia. On release, Rolling Stone's Michael Bloom opined that the songs "all stem from the universal library of luminous pop enjoyment that this curious artist carries around in his head. They condense the whole world into a three-minute capsule and promise eternal youth. They know the rules so well that it's almost a joy to conform. ... Neither simple nor always pleasant, Todd Rundgren is still an artist to be taken seriously." Conversely, Robert Christgau of The Village Voice wrote a single-sentence review that stated: "Only a weight as willfully light as Todd can be trusted to put his smartest song ('Onomatopeia') on 'the easy side' and his dumbest ('Bag Lady') on 'the difficult side.'"

"Can We Still Be Friends?" became Rundgren's most-covered song, with versions by Robert Palmer, Rod Stewart, Colin Blunstone, and Mandy Moore. Retrospectively, Sam Sodomsky of Pitchfork wrote that the album was the only record in Rundgren's discography that comes close to the "moments of enlightenment" heard on Something/Anything? or A Wizard, a True Star. He wrote: "The ballads [on Hermit of Mink Hollow] were heavier, and the moments of levity felt more compulsive, like a man punching himself in the head to get out of a funk. ... Rundgren understood all along that things would never be the same. There’s a reason why he sang 'I Saw the Light' in the past tense: his life’s work depended on knowing you can never get that first high again."

Stephen Thomas Erlewine of AllMusic felt that Hermit of Mink Hollow was Rundgren's "most emotional record", and in comparison to Something/Anything? is "more cohesive. It also feels less brilliant, even if it is, in many ways, nearly as excellent as Rundgren's masterwork, mainly because it doesn't have such a wide scope." Writing in The Rough Guide to Rock (2003), Nicholas Olivier deemed Mink Hollow "his best for a long while. Despite the clunker of 'Onomatopoeia', Rundgren reconfirmed his hit-making potential (the awesome hooks of 'Can We Still Be Friends?') and reeled off a string of typically great ballads, capping it all with the sublime chorus of 'You Cried Wolf'. Nothing Rundgren has done since has matched this late-70s peak."

== Track listing ==
All tracks are written by Todd Rundgren.

Side one – "The Easy Side"
No.	Title	Length
1.	"All the Children Sing"	3:08
2.	"Can We Still Be Friends"	3:34
3.	"Hurting for You"	3:20
4.	"Too Far Gone"	2:38
5.	"Onomatopoeia"	1:34
6.	"Determination"	3:11

Side two – "The Difficult Side"
No.	Title	Length
7.	"Bread"	2:48
8.	"Bag Lady"	3:13
9.	"You Cried Wolf"	2:20
10.	"Lucky Guy"	2:04
11.	"Out of Control"	3:56
12.	"Fade Away"	3:04
Total length:		34:50

== Personnel ==
- Todd Rundgren – all vocals and instruments (acoustic guitar, electric guitar, piano, keyboards, synthesizers, bass, drums, percussion, saxophone), arrangements

=== Technical ===
- Produced and engineered by Todd Rundgren
- Additional engineering – Mike Young
- Photography – Daniel McCauley

== Charts ==
Hermit of Mink Hollow

Chart (1978)	Peak position
Australia (Kent Music Report)	11
Canada RPM Album Chart	27
UK Albums Chart	42
US Billboard Pop Albums	36

"Can We Still Be Friends"

Chart (1978)	Peak position
Canada RPM Singles Chart	37
US Billboard Hot 100	29
US Billboard Adult Contemporary	45
