= Hi (Elizabeth Barraclough album) =

Studio album by Elizabeth Barraclough
- Released: 1979
- Recorded: 1979
- Studio: Hi, Memphis
- Genre: Blues rock
- Label: Bearsville
- Producer: Willie Mitchell

Elizabeth Barraclough chronology
Elizabeth Barraclough (1978)	Hi (1979)

Hi is the second album by the American musician Elizabeth Barraclough, released in 1979.

== Production ==
The album was produced by Willie Mitchell. Its songs were written by Barraclough, aside from "You'll Lose a Good Thing". The Memphis Horns and Memphis Strings contributed to some of the tracks. Barraclough used her band during the recording sessions, although Leroy Hodges contributed on bass and Paul Butterfield, Barraclough's boyfriend, played harmonica.

== Critical reception ==
Professional ratings
Review scores
Source	Rating
The Courier-Journal	9/10
Duluth News Tribune	1/10
Omaha World-Herald	3.5/5 stars
Rolling Stone	4/5 stars
The New Rolling Stone Record Guide	3/5 stars

The Blade-Tribune praised the "polished quality" of the album, as well as Barraclough's "direct songs". The Hartford Courant panned Barraclough's "raw-voiced vocals that crack under strain" and "pedestrian guitar playing". The Greenville News concluded that "the tough, gritty edge that she exhibited last time out is gone, replaced by a softer, soulful vocal."

The Courier-Journal called Hi "a find of the year". The Gazette likewise labeled it "one of the standout albums of summer". The Duluth News Tribune dismissed Barraclough as a "no-talent groaner". The Washington Post said, "Barraclough sings with the emotional intensity of soul music but with no trace of its fatalism, replacing that with desire waiting to break loose." The New Rolling Stone Record Guide stated that the album was "competent" blues rock.

== Track listing ==
Side 1

1. "Devil at the Door"
2. "Gotta Lotta Love"
3. "Use Your Heart"
4. "So Good to See You"
5. "You'll Lose a Good Thing"

Side 2

1. "Space Shuttle Shuffle"
2. "How Come?"
3. "Time and Love"
4. "Concentrate"
5. "Bird in a Cage"
