= Just When I Needed You Most =

Song by Randy VanWarmer

Single by Randy VanWarmer

from the album Warmer
- B-side: "Your Light"
- Released: February 1979
- Studio: Creative Workshop (Berry Hill, Tennessee)
- Genre: Soft rock
- Length: 3:58
- Label: Bearsville
- Songwriter: Randy VanWarmer
- Producer: Del Newman

Music video
- "Just When I Needed You Most" (TopPop, 1979) on YouTube

"Just When I Needed You Most" is a 1979 hit single by the American singer-songwriter Randy VanWarmer.

== Background ==
VanWarmer wrote "Just When I Needed You Most" in 1973, at age 18. He was already an aspiring singer-songwriter at that point, living in Cornwall, England, where his family had moved to three years previously. After recording "Just When I Needed You Most" for an album recorded for the UK division of Bearsville Records, VanWarmer flew to the US to pressure Bearsville's head office to promote the album, which was remixed and released with "Just When I Needed You Most" as lead single. VanWarmer recalled that Bearsville evinced little enthusiasm for the track: "Nobody thought my version was an especially good version of the song [which] a few other people were thinking of cutting...Everybody just assumed mine was a demo for people to listen to who'd cut the definitive version". It has also been asserted that the flip, "Your Light", was the original intended A-side of VanWarmer's single.

Released as a single in February 1979, "Just When I Needed You Most" spent two weeks atop the US Billboard adult contemporary chart in May, and in June reached its peak position of No. 4 on the Billboard Hot 100 chart, accruing an overall Top 40 tenure of 14 weeks and earning RIAA Gold record status. In addition, the track reached No. 71 on the Billboard country music chart and in September 1979 made the Top 10 on the UK Singles Chart, peaking at No. 8. VanWarmer attributed its success to empathy for its heartbreak scenario: "It's happened to everyone. That emotion is universal...I always hoped the record wasn't wallowing in self-pity and it had some redeeming value, and I guess it does." VanWarmer also attributed the success to the autoharp instrumental break between the second and third verses, performed by John Sebastian.

== Chart performance ==
=== Weekly charts ===
Chart (1979–1980)	Peak position
Australia (Kent Music Report)	17
Belgium (Ultratop 50 Flanders)	5
Canada Top Singles (RPM)	32
Canada Adult Contemporary (RPM)	5
Ireland (IRMA)	5
Netherlands (Single Top 100)	6
New Zealand (Recorded Music NZ)	9
Quebec (ADISQ)	19
UK Singles Chart	8
US Billboard Hot 100	4
US Billboard Adult Contemporary	1
US Billboard Country Singles	71
US Cash Box Top 100	5
Zimbabwe (ZIMA)	1

=== Year-end charts ===
Chart (1979)	Rank
Australia (Kent Music Report)	94
Canada	192
UK	74
US Billboard Hot 100	29
US Cash Box	46

== Cover versions ==
Tony Wilson of the band Hot Chocolate recorded "Just When I Needed You Most" for his 1979 album Catch One. Dolly Parton recorded a cover version for her 1996 album Treasures; like the original, it features John Sebastian on autoharp, and reached No. 62 on the Billboard country music chart. Other artists who either recorded or performed the song in concert include country music singers Tim McGraw, Donna Fargo, Skeeter Davis, Rhonda Vincent, and Conway Twitty, R&B vocalist Millie Jackson, the German disco musician Peter Griffin, British glam rock band Smokie, reggae artists Barbara Jones and Eddie Lovette, Filipino singer Pops Fernandez, Bob Dylan, Paul Butterfield, Billy Joe Royal, and the Spanish group Mocedades. In 2002, the American-Taiwanese singer Will Pan released a bilingual English/Chinese version of the song. Dana Winner recorded "Just When I Needed You Most" for her 2011 album Unforgettable. Anne Nolan recorded it for her 2013 debut solo album Just One Voice.

In 1978, before it was a hit, "Just When I Needed You Most" was recorded by Ian Hunter, Mick Ronson, Corky Laing, and Felix Pappalardi. Their version was released in 1999, on the "Secret Sessions" CD.

A Finnish rendering of "Just When I Needed You Most", "Juuri Kun Tarvitsin Sua", was recorded by ELF (fi) for its 1979 album Tarantella-Joe. Ingela "Pling" Forsman wrote lyrics in Swedish as När jag behövde dig mest, which was recorded by Swedish dansband Wizex on the 1980 album You Treated Me Wrong. A Spanish rendering, "Necesitando Tu Amor", was recorded by Mocedades for its 1982 album Amor De Hombre. An Austrian rendering, "Ausg´lacht", was recorded by Wolfgang Ambros for his 2012 album 190352. Francine Jordi sang the song in 2013 in Switzerdeutsch dialect as "Wo di am meischte ha brucht".

== See also ==
- List of Billboard Adult Contemporary number ones of 1979
- List of 1970s one-hit wonders in the United States
