= Rock and Roll Outlaws =

Studio album by Foghat
- Released: October 1974
- Recorded: 1974
- Genres: Blues rock, hard rock
- Length: 39:02
- Labels: Bearsville (original); Rhino (reissue)
- Producer: Nick Jameson

Foghat chronology
Energized (1974)	Rock and Roll Outlaws (1974)	Fool for the City (1975)

Professional ratings
Review scores
Source	Rating
AllMusic	2.5/5 stars

Rock and Roll Outlaws is the fourth album by Foghat, released in October 1974. The album cover shows a picture of the band near a Learjet in the Mojave Desert. Though the airplane displayed the band's logo, it did not belong to them; the band borrowed it and stuck on the logo.

== Track listing ==
1. "Eight Days on the Road" (Michael Gayle, Jerry Ragovoy) - 6:08
2. "Hate to See You Go" (Dave Peverett, Rod Price) - 4:39
3. "Dreamer" (Peverett, Price) - 6:39
4. "Trouble in My Way" (Peverett) - 3:32
5. "Rock and Roll Outlaw" (Felix Cavaliere, Carman Moore) - 3:53
6. "Shirley Jean" (Peverett, Price) - 3:46
7. "Blue Spruce Woman" (David Anderson) - 4:08
8. "Chateau Lafitte '59 Boogie" (Peverett, Price) - 6:17

== Foghat ==
- Lonesome Dave: Lead vocals, rhythm guitar
- Rod Price: Lead guitar, Vocals
- Tony Stevens: Bass guitar
- Roger Earl: Drums
- Nick Jameson: guest piano soloist on "Shirley Jean"

== Charts ==
Chart (1974)	Peak position
Canada Top Albums/CDs (RPM)	82
US Billboard 200	40

== Certifications ==
Region	Certification	Certified units/sales
United States (RIAA)	Gold	500,000^{^}
^{^} Shipments figures based on certification alone.
