= Murdering Oscar (And Other Love Songs) =

Studio album by Patterson Hood
- Released: June 23, 2009
- Recorded: Chase Park Transduction Studios in Athens, Georgia in 2005
- Genre: Rock
- Length: 52:39
- Labels: Ruth St., ATO
- Producers: Patterson Hood, David Barbe

Patterson Hood chronology
| Killers and Stars (2004) | Murdering Oscar (And Other Love Songs) (2009) | Heat Lightning Rumbles in the Distance (2012) |

Murdering Oscar (And Other Love Songs) is the second solo album by Patterson Hood. The album's songs were written from 1994 to 2004, and recording began in early 2005 in Athens, Georgia, USA. Murdering Oscar was released on June 23, 2009, by Hood's own label, Ruth St. Records, and on ATO Records. The music consists of guitar chords and reverb on some tracks, while others also have piano. The lyrics address topics that affected Hood around the time the songs were written, such as the birth of his child and his success with the Drive-By Truckers.

The album received mainly favorable reviews from critics, who praised it for being optimistic and mature in its handling of both positive and negative themes. Some also commended it for addressing these themes in a compassionate manner, and for being exceptionally personal compared to his previous work with the Drive-By Truckers. However, others criticized it as inferior to Hood's previous work with them. Murdering Oscar peaked at No. 153 on the Billboard 200 chart.

== Background and recording ==
Half of the songs on the album were written when Hood moved to Athens in 1994, before the Drive-By Truckers were established, and soon after his previous band, Adam's House Cat, disbanded. The other half were written in 2004, shortly after his child was born. However, the songs were not recorded until 2005, with recording starting in early January that year at David Barbe's Athens studio Chase Park Transduction. In addition to Hood, most of the instruments on Murdering Oscar were played by the former Truckers' sidemen Barbe, Will Johnson, and Scott Danbom, as well as Hood's father, David Hood.

Jewly Hight compared Murdering Oscar to Chinese Democracy, writing that while Axl Rose "obsessively retooled Guns N' Roses' Chinese Democracy in 14 studios over 13 years, all the while stringing along the public with empty promises of a finished album", Hood handled his long-in-the-making album rather differently, by leaving the album essentially unchanged from its recording in 2005 to its release four years later. Hood has attributed this delay between the songs' recording in 2005 and Murdering's release four years later to "record industry bullshit". The album was released on June 23, 2009, by Hood's own Ruth St. Records label.

== Music and lyrics ==
Murdering Oscar (And Other Love Songs) has songs from several genres that Hood explored in his previous work, including country and Southern rock. The songs on the album were influenced by his second marriage, the birth of his child and the success of the Drive-By Truckers. Steve LaBate described Murdering Oscar's music as "a little of everything Hood’s done so far, plus a few dashes of discovery". Stuart Henderson, writing in PopMatters, described its music as "grinding three-or-four chord garage rock, [and] drive-heavy reverb" and its lyrics as "throaty storytelling, a hefty dose of gallows humour, and a few slow-burning excursions into some poor schlub’s bleak night".

"Murdering Oscar" tells a tale of a "morally elastic hitman" inspired by the Woody Allen film, Crimes and Misdemeanors (1989). "Pollyanna", the oldest song on the album, blends "filthy guitars" and "lucid, hopeful piano". "Pride of the Yankees" is a "bleak, uncharacteristic piano waltz". The "poppy" "I Understand Now" finds Hood happy and content with his life and coming to understand, as an adult, the advice he received in his youth. "Screwtopia" is "a sardonic portrait of suburban domestic tranquility" that "seems almost wistful". The "optimistic" "Granddaddy" is about having a child and growing old. "Belvedere" is a "bad-date song" about "a creepy guy", according to Hood. "The Range War" is a cover version of a Todd Rundgren song from Runt. The Ballad of Todd Rundgren. "She's a Little Randy" finds Hood sounding silly. "Foolish Young Bastard" is "a put-down aimed at an old manager". "Heavy and Hanging" was written in response to Kurt Cobain's suicide in 1994. "Walking Around Sense" displays a sound similar to that of Crazy Horse, and some have speculated that the song may be criticizing Courtney Love's parenting ability. "Back of a Bible" is a love song Hood wrote to his wife in the back of a motel Bible while touring.

== Reception ==
Professional ratings
Aggregate scores
| Source | Rating |
|---|---|
| Metacritic | 80% |
Review scores
| Source | Rating |
| AllMusic | 4/5 stars |
| The A.V. Club | A− |
| Billboard | (favorable) |
| Chicago Tribune | 3/4 stars |
| MSN Music (Consumer Guide) | A− |
| Paste | 8.2/10 |
| Pitchfork | 7.6/10 |
| PopMatters | 8/10 stars |
| Uncut | 4/5 |

According to the review aggregator Metacritic, Murdering Oscar (And Other Love Songs) has a score of 80/100, indicating "generally favorable reviews". Several critics described Murdering Oscar's music as more intimate and personal than Hood's previous work with the Drive-By Truckers. Jon Pareles also noted that Hood's music on Murdering Oscar discusses both depressing topics, such as murder and suicide, as well as more positive ones such as "family and continuity" on "I Understand Now". Joshua Klein wrote that Hood was "surprisingly sanguine, even mature" in the way he addressed both positive and negative topics on the album, and AllMusic's Mark Deming wrote that its songs were "dark but compassionate character studies", adding that it "consistently cuts closer to the bone" than Hood's first solo album, Killers and Stars (2004). Greg Kot gave Murdering Oscar three stars out of four and wrote that it "maintains a certain raw immediacy".

Different critics made different comparisons between the album and the work Hood did with the Drive-By Truckers: Ken Tucker wrote, "Where the music made by the Drive-By Truckers can expand to epic proportions without becoming overblown, Hood's solo songs are smaller scale, more intimate." Stuart Henderson in PopMatters wrote "None of the songs here would be out of place on either of the last two Truckers albums", and "The sound, then, remains the same, but just a little less the same." Henderson also argued that the music of Murdering Oscar discusses variations on the story of "the lonely, forgotten everyman", which he called one of Hood's favorite themes. Jesse Cataldo, writing in Slant, criticized the album for being far inferior to Hood's work with the Truckers, saying that on Murdering Oscar "Hood falters, resulting in an uninterrupted stream of watery drivel that drifts by much too slowly". He attributed this in part to the absence of the Truckers' other songwriter, Mike Cooley. It was ranked 316th on the Village Voice's 2009 Pazz & Jop, 39th on Robert Christgau's 2009 "Dean's List", and was named the fifth best album of 2009 by Steven Hyden of The A.V. Club. It peaked at number 153 on the Billboard 200 on July 11, 2009.

== Track listing ==
All songs written by Patterson Hood, except where noted.

1. "Murdering Oscar" – 4:27
2. "Pollyanna" – 4:37 (Mike Cooley, Patterson Hood)
3. "Pride of the Yankees" – 4:16
4. "I Understand Now" – 3:22
5. "Screwtopia" – 4:35
6. "Granddaddy" – 2:39
7. "Belvedere" – 3:59
8. "The Range War" – 3:50 (Todd Rundgren)
9. "She's a Little Randy" – 4:28
10. "Foolish Young Bastard" – 2:31
11. "Heavy and Hanging" – 4:14
12. "Walking Around Sense" – 5:13
13. "Back of a Bible" – 4:28

== Personnel ==
=== Musicians ===
- Patterson Hood – guitar, piano, lead vocals
- Will Johnson – guitar, harmony, vocals
- Scott Danbom – fiddle, harmony, piano, vocals
- David Barbe – bass guitar, guitar, piano
- Mike Cooley – guitar
- Frank MacDonnell – guitar
- David Hood – bass guitar
- Shonna Tucker – bass guitar
- Brad Morgan – drums
- John Neff – pedal steel
- Don Chambers – banjo
- Kevin Lane – backing vocals

=== Production ===
- David Barbe – producer, engineer, mixing
- Patterson Hood – producer, liner notes
- Glenn Schick – mastering
- Lilla Hood – art direction
- Wes Freed – artwork
- Sean Fine – photography
- Wendy Van Pelt – photography
