= Windy City Breakdown =

Studio album by Jonathan Cain
- Released: April 1977
- Genre: Rock
- Length: 36:46
- Label: Bearsville (original release); Wounded Bird (CD reissue)
- Producer: Jonathan Cain, J.C. Phillips

Jonathan Cain chronology
Windy City Breakdown (1977)	Back to the Innocence (1995)

Windy City Breakdown is the debut solo album by the American keyboard player and guitarist Jonathan Cain.

After this album, Cain joined The Babys.

== Track listing ==
1. "Windy City Breakdown" (Jonathan Cain, J.C. Phillips) 4:18
2. "Lay Low Joe (Holiday On Ice)" (Cain, Phillips) 5:03
3. "Rock It Down" (Cain, Phillips) 4:27
4. "Moon Child" (Cain) 5:21
5. "Rollercoaster Baby" (Cain) 3:45
6. "Spinning My Wheels" (Cain) 4:20
7. "Go Now" (Larry Banks, Milton Bennett) 3:12
8. "Your Lady or Your Life" (Cain) 6:06
9. "Backseat Bernice" (single not on album)

== Personnel ==
- Jonathan Cain - vocals, keyboards, piano, clavinet, organ
- Tommy "Mugs" Cain - drums
- Jimmy Arnold - guitars, backing vocals
- Gary Richwine - bass, backing vocals
- Ralph MacDonald, Bobbye Hall - percussion

== Production ==
- Produced by Jonathan Cain & J.C. Phillips
- Engineered & mixed By Bert Szerlip
- Tracks 4–6 & 8 published by Blue Lick Music-Fiction Music.
- Tracks 1–3 published by Blue Lick Music-Fiction Music/Bald Mountain Music-Fourth Floor Music.
- Track 7 published by Trio Music Co.
