= Felix Cavaliere (album) =

Studio album by Felix Cavaliere
- Released: September 1974
- Label: Bearsville Records (original release); Wounded Bird Records (CD reissue)
- Producer: Todd Rundgren

Felix Cavaliere chronology
Felix Cavaliere (1974)	Destiny (1974)

Felix Cavaliere is the first solo album by Felix Cavaliere, former member, primary songwriter and one of the two lead singers of the Rascals (formerly the Young Rascals). It was produced by Todd Rundgren for Bearsville Records in 1974.

== Track listing ==
All tracks composed by Felix Cavaliere and Carman Moore.

1. "A High Price to Pay"
2. "I Am a Gambler"
3. "I've Got a Solution"
4. "Everlasting Love"
5. "Summer in El Barrio"
6. "Long Times Gone"
7. "Future Train"
8. "Mountain Man"
9. "Funky Friday"
10. "It's Been a Long Long Time"
11. "I am Free"
12. "A High Price to Pay" (single version) (bonus track found on the 2007 JVC Victor/Bearsville Japan release, catalog #63729)

== Personnel ==
- Felix Cavaliere - vocals, piano, organ
- Carman Moore - string arrangements
- John Siegler, Mervin Bronson - bass
- Kermit Moore - cello
- Paul Fleisher - saxophone, clarinet
- Antonio Jiminez Arana - congas
- Jack Scarangella, Kevin Ellman - drums
- Elliot Randall, John Hall, Todd Rundgren - guitar
- Gualberto Garcia Perez - flamenco guitar
- Hank DeVito - pedal steel guitar
- Jack Jeffers - baritone horns
- Antonio Jiminez Arana, Pablo Rosario - percussion
- Kenneth Bichel, Roger Powell - ARP synthesizer
- Barry Rogers - trombone
- Al Rubin, Larry Spencer, Randy Brecker - trumpet
- Alfred Brown, Julien Barber, Selwart Clarke - viola
- Noel Da Costa, Raymond Kunicki, W. Sanford Allen - violin
- Cissy Houston, Deidre Tuck, Felix Cavaliere, Judy Clay, Renelle Stafford - background vocals
- Alex Rutsch - cover
