= Rod Price =

English guitarist and member of Foghat (1947–2005)

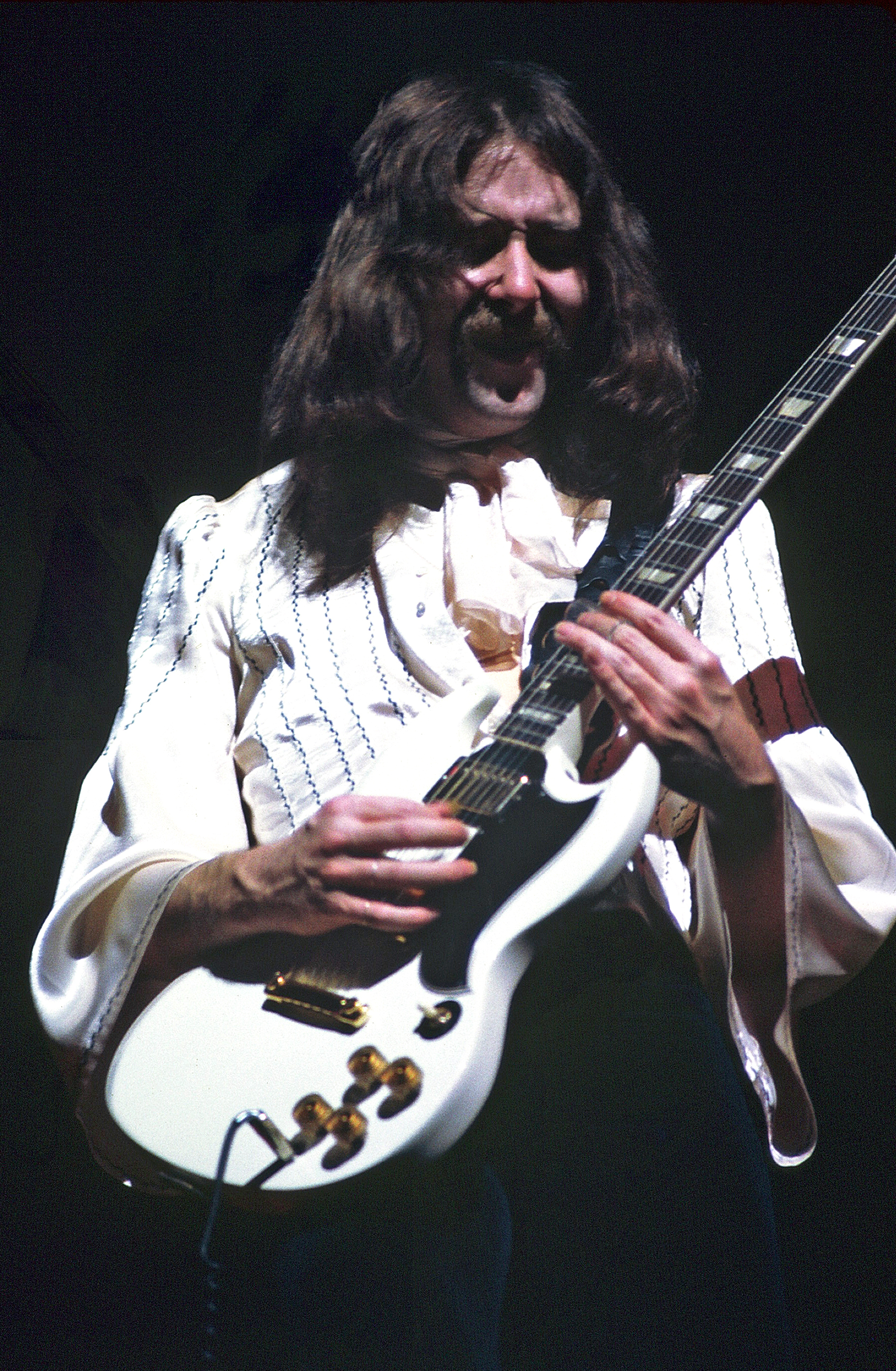
- Price in 1973

Background information
- Also known as: The Bottle
- Born: Roderick Michael Price; 22 November 1947; Chiswick, London, England
- Died: 22 March 2005 (aged 57) Wilton, New Hampshire, U.S.
- Genre: Blues rock
- Occupation: Guitarist
- Years active: 1968–2005

Roderick Michael Price (22 November 1947 – 22 March 2005) was an English guitarist best known for his work with the rock band Foghat. He was known as 'The Magician of Slide', 'The Bottle', and 'Slide King of Rock and Roll', due to his proficiency on slide guitar.

== Career ==
Price grew up in West London with his father and brother. Price joined British blues band Black Cat Bones at the age of 21, replacing guitarist Paul Kossoff. They recorded one album, Barbed Wire Sandwich, which was released in early 1970, when British blues was being supplanted by rock. The album was a critical success but a commercial failure.

Black Cat Bones disbanded, and Price joined Foghat when it formed in London in 1971. He played on the band's first ten albums, released from 1972 through to 1980. His signature slide playing ability helped propel the band to be one of the most successful rock groups in the United States during the 1970s. His slide playing was featured distinctly on Foghat songs "Drivin' Wheel", "Stone Blue", and the group's biggest hit, "Slow Ride", which was a top 20 hit in 1976. Price's final performance with Foghat before he left for the first time was at the Philadelphia Spectrum on 16 November 1980. He was replaced by guitarist Erik Cartwright.

Price virtually disappeared from the music business until 1990, when he briefly joined forces with Foghat vocalist Dave Peverett. Foghat had actually split a few years after Price left, and drummer Roger Earl had reformed the band without Peverett, who decided to start up his own version of the band and invited Price to participate. Price was in and out of the band for the next couple of years, but agreed to commit totally to a reunion featuring all four original Foghat members in 1993.

Foghat then released Return of the Boogie Men in September 1994. The album failed to gain as much commercial success as the band had previously earned, but nevertheless they hit the road and began touring regularly across North America, rebuilding their reputation as an excellent live act. Foghat released the Road Cases CD in May 1998, a live recording. A DVD titled Two Centuries of Boogie was recorded at a 1997 concert in Dayton, Ohio.

Price once again left Foghat in 1999, after vocalist Dave Peverett was diagnosed with cancer. The singer returned to the band after several months of recuperation, but by this point Price had decided he wanted to step away from full-time road work and parted company with Foghat. He was replaced by guitarist Bryan Bassett.

Price began a solo career at the beginning of the 21st century and returned to his blues roots. He released two CDs, Open (2000) and West Four (2003). He toured and performed in blues clubs across the United States, and also featured at guitar seminars and workshops during this period.

Price died at his home in Wilton, New Hampshire, on 22 March 2005, after having a heart attack and falling down a flight of stairs; he was 57 years old. He is survived by his wife Jackie and five children.

Price was married to Robyn Renzi in the 1970s, but they divorced in 1979. They had no children.

During his long career, Price collaborated with Shakey Vick's Blues Band, Champion Jack Dupree, Duster Bennett, Eddie Kirkland, Muddy Waters, John Lee Hooker, Willie Dixon, and David "Honeyboy" Edwards.

== Discography ==
=== With Black Cat Bones ===
- Barbed Wire Sandwich (1970)

=== With Foghat ===
- Foghat (1972 album) (1972)
- Foghat (Rock And Roll) (1973)
- Energized (1974)
- Rock and Roll Outlaws (1974)
- Fool for the City (1975)
- Night Shift (1976)
- Foghat Live (1977)
- Stone Blue (1978)
- Boogie Motel (1979)
- Tight Shoes (1980)
- Girls To Chat Boys To Bounce (1981)
- Return of the Boogie Men (1994)
- Road Cases (1998)

=== Solo career ===
- Open (2000)
- West Four (2003)
