= Barbara Jones (singer) =

- Born: Barbara Nation c. 1952; Kingston, Jamaica
- Died: 19 December 2014 (aged 62) Kingston, Jamaica
- Genres: Reggae, gospel
- Years active: 1971–2014
- Labels: Trojan, GG's, Dynamic, VP

Barbara Nation (c. 1952 – 19 December 2014), better known as Barbara Jones, was a Jamaican singer who had a UK hit single in 1981 with "Just When I Needed You Most".

== Career ==
Born in Kingston and raised in Manchester, Jamaica, she began her career in 1971 with the single "Sad Movies". She had her greatest success in January 1981 with "Just When I Needed You Most", which reached number 31 on the UK Singles Chart.

She toured as backing singer with Jimmy Cliff in the late 1970s and early 1980s; In 1991, she became a devout Christian and gave up secular music to concentrate on gospel music.

After becoming ill in London, she was diagnosed with leukaemia in February 2014. She returned to reggae with performances in Brazil with Lloyd Parks. Her health deteriorated and she died in Kingston's University Hospital of the West Indies on 19 December 2014, from pneumonia contracted during chemotherapy treatments. She was 62 years old.

Jones was once described as "the Billie Holliday of reggae music".

== Discography ==
- Don't Stop Loving Me (1979), GG's
- My Love: Just When I Needed You Most (1980), Rhino
- Sings Hit Songs In Reggae Style (1983), Top Rank
- You're Always On My Mind (1984), Dynamic
- 10 Million Sellers In Reggae (1985), Top Rank
- Need to Belong (1985), EAD
- Will It Last Forever, Hit
- For Your Ears Only (1994), Jamaican Gold
- The Two of Us, Park Height - Phillip James feat. Barbara Jones
- Jesus Is Calling (2000), VP
- Thank You Lord for Your Blessing (2005), Silver Lining
- So Much to Thank Him For (2005), Silver Lining
- Use Me Lord (2011), Nylahs Gospel Music

Compilations

- Best of Barbara Jones (1976), Trojan
- Sad Movies (1997), Charly
- Just When I Needed You Most: The Best of Barbara Jones (2004), Trojan
- Blue Side of Lonesome (2007), Jet Star/Zone Entertainment
