= Elizabeth Barraclough =

American musician

- Origin: New Mexico, U.S.
- Genres: Rock, folk, folk rock
- Occupations: Musician, singer-songwriter
- Instruments: Vocals, guitar
- Label: Bearsville Records

Elizabeth Barraclough is an American musician whose songs span the genres of folk, country, rock and pop. She was managed by Bob Dylan's manager Albert Grossman, and is perhaps best known for having played both live and on record with Paul Butterfield, Charlie McCoy, Kenny Buttrey, and Todd Rundgren.

== Personal life ==
Barraclough originated in New Mexico before moving to the eastern coast of the United States.

== Career ==
During her career, she released two albums, a self-titled record in 1978 and Hi in 1979, both on Grossman's Bearsville Records. Her 1978 album spawned a 45 single, "Covered Up In Aces." Her self-titled album was given warm reviews by The Village Voice's Robert Christgau as well as The Pittsburgh Press.

Barraclough performed "Covered Up In Aces" on The Old Grey Whistle Test during an episode documenting the 1977 Bearsville Picnic in Woodstock, New York.

== Discography ==
- Elizabeth Barraclough - 1978
- Hi - 1979
