= Only a Lonely Heart Sees =

1980 single by Felix Cavaliere

Single by Felix Cavaliere

from the album Castles in the Air
- B-side: "You Turned Me Around"
- Released: March 21, 1980
- Recorded: 1979
- Genre: Soft rock
- Length: 3:41
- Label: Epic
- Songwriters: Felix Cavaliere; Jim Tran
- Producers: Felix Cavaliere; Cengiz Yaltkaya

Felix Cavaliere singles chronology
"Good to Have Love Back" (1979)	"Only a Lonely Heart Sees" (1980)	"Castles in the Air" (1980)

"Only a Lonely Heart Sees" is a song by American singer-songwriter Felix Cavaliere, released as a single in 1980. It is from his 1979 album Castles in the Air.

The song is Cavaliere's only solo top 40 hit on the Billboard Hot 100, peaking at No. 36. It is also his only top 5 hit on the Adult Contemporary chart, peaking at No. 2.

== Chart performance ==
Chart (1980)	Peak position
U.S. Billboard Hot 100	36
U.S. Billboard Adult Contemporary	2

== See also ==
- List of one-hit wonders in the United States
