= Warmer (Randy VanWarmer album) =

Studio album by Randy VanWarmer
- Released: 1979
- Studio: Creative Workshop (Berry Hill, Tennessee); Scorpio Sound (London, UK); Bearsville (Woodstock, New York); Power Station (New York, New York)
- Genre: Soft rock
- Label: Bearsville
- Producer: Del Newman

Randy VanWarmer chronology
Warmer (1979)	Terraform (1980)

Warmer is the debut album by American singer-songwriter Randy VanWarmer.

== Release ==
After moving back to the United States from Cornwall, England in 1978 and settling in Woodstock, New York, twenty-three-year-old VanWarmer signed to local label Bearsville Records. A year later Warmer was released and produced by Del Newman. It was initially released on vinyl, 8-track, and cassette, and in 1995 it was released on compact disc. "Just When I Needed You Most" was written by VanWarmer when he was eighteen and still in England, and the song has been described as "a ballad of heartbreak from a man's point of view." It reached No. 4 on Billboard in 1979.

=== Promotion ===
By December 1980, VanWarmer toured in Europe to support the release of Warmer, as well as Japan and Hong Kong.

== Reception ==
Professional ratings
Review scores
Source	Rating
Allmusic	4.5/5 stars
Billboard	Mixed
Rolling Stone	2/5 stars

A brief review in a 1979 issue of Billboard compares VanWarmer's style of singing on Warmer to that of The Bee Gees, and although the writer felt the album lacked diversity, "Just When I Needed You Most" was regarded as a good cut. According to The Guinness Encyclopedia of Popular Music, "Just When I Needed You Most" was the song VanWarmer was "best remembered for."

== Track listing ==
All tracks composed by Randy VanWarmer

Side one
No.	Title	Length
1.	"Losing Out on Love"	3:04
2.	"Just When I Needed You Most"	3:59
3.	"Your Light"	4:02
4.	"Gotta Get Out of Here"	3:01
5.	"Convincing Lies"	3:31

Side two
No.	Title	Length
6.	"Call Me"	4:24
7.	"Forever Loving You"	3:19
8.	"Deeper and Deeper"	3:47
9.	"I Could Sing"	3:17
10.	"The One Who Loves You"	4:34

== Personnel ==
- Randy VanWarmer - vocals, guitar, backing vocals
- Arti Funaro, John Holbrook, John Tropea, Johnny Christopher, Mick Barakan, Steve Gibson - guitar
- Jack Williams, Tony Levin - bass
- John Holbrook, Mick Hodgkinson, Shane Keister, Warren Bernhardt - keyboards
- Kenny Malone, Steve Jordan - drums
- George Carnell, Ian Kimmet, John Holbrook, Ray Cooper - percussion
- John Sebastian - autoharp
- Stan Saltzman - saxophone
- Alan Williams, Chris Thompson, Gary Osborne, John Richardson, Katie Kissoon, Roger Moss, Stevie Lange - backing vocals
- Del Newman - string arrangements, conductor

Technical

- John Holbrook - additional production, engineer, remixing
- Ian Kimmet - additional production
- Brent Maher, George Carnell, Jeff Hendrickson, Richard Dodd, Scott Litt - engineer
- Desmond Strobel - art direction
- Aaron Rapoport - photography

== Charts ==
Chart (1979)	Position
Australia (Kent Music Report)	67
US Billboard 200	81
