= Randy VanWarmer =

American singer-songwriter (1955–2004)

- VanWarmer in 1981

Background information
- Born: Randall Edwin Van Wormer; March 30, 1955; Indian Hills, Colorado, U.S.
- Origin: Woodstock, New York, U.S.
- Died: January 12, 2004 (aged 48) Seattle, Washington, U.S.
- Genres: Soft rock; pop
- Occupations: Musician; singer; songwriter
- Instruments: Vocals; guitar
- Years active: 1978–2004
- Label: Bearsville Records

Randall Edwin Van Wormer, known professionally as Randy VanWarmer (also spelled Vanwarmer or Van Warmer; March 30, 1955 – January 12, 2004) was an American singer-songwriter and guitarist. His biggest hit song was "Just When I Needed You Most". It reached No. 8 on the UK Singles Chart in September 1979 after peaking at No. 4 on the Billboard Hot 100 and No. 1 on Billboard Hot Adult Contemporary Tracks earlier that year.

He wrote several songs for the Oak Ridge Boys, including "I Guess It Never Hurts to Hurt Sometimes", which reached No. 1 on the Hot Country Songs chart. The song appeared on his 1981 album Beat of Love, which also included the single "Suzi Found a Weapon", which hit No. 55 on the Billboard Hot 100. He again reached No. 1 on Hot Country Songs in 1992 with "I'm in a Hurry (And Don't Know Why)", recorded by the band Alabama.

== Early life ==
Randall Van Wormer was born in Indian Hills, Colorado, the son of Roger Van Wormer and Betsy (née Harry). When he was 12, his father died in an automobile accident. At age 15, he moved with his mother and three brothers to Looe, Cornwall, England.

== Career ==
While still a teenager, VanWarmer began a singing and songwriting career. In addition to playing at local coffeehouses, he "would write 5 or 6 songs and take them 250 miles to London (by train) knocking on publishers' doors." He wrote "Just When I Needed You Most" at age 18. He said that he was inspired to write the song about a beloved old car he drove for years and which broke down on his way to work in Denver, Colorado. He had also experienced a "devastating" breakup with a girlfriend and composed the song six months after their separation.

VanWarmer befriended singer-songwriter Ian Kimmet, of Island Records, and when Kimmet moved to Bearsville Records, he convinced Bearsville head Albert Grossman to sign VanWarmer.

VanWarmer was originally considered by Bearsville as a songerwriter rather than a singer, even after he began recording his songs. VanWarmer recalled Bearsville's general lack of enthusiasm for his own recording of "Just When I Needed You Most": "Nobody thought my version was an especially good version of the song, [which] a few other people were thinking of cutting. [...] Everybody just assumed mine was a demo for people to listen to who'd [later] cut the definitive version". In 1978, the song was recorded by a planned supergroup that would have comprised Ian Hunter, Mick Ronson, Corky Laing, and Felix Pappalardi, but the group never materialized and the recording went unreleased until 1999.

In 1978 VanWarmer moved to Bearsville, New York, location of the label's headquarters. His first album, Warmer, was released in February 1979, with "Just When I Needed You Most" released as the lead single.

"Just When I Needed You Most" rose to the top 10 in the United States, Canada, and the United Kingdom, and would become VanWarmer's signature song. The record spent two weeks on the US Billboard adult contemporary chart in May of that year, and by June reached its peak position of No. 4 on the Billboard Hot 100 chart. It accrued an overall Top 40 tenure of 14 weeks, earning RIAA Gold record status. In addition, the track reached No. 71 on the Billboard country music chart. In September, it reached the Top 10 on the UK Singles Chart, peaking at No. 8.

His second album, Terraform (1980), was dark and more alternative than his previous work. Terraform sold moderately in Japan and Australia. VanWarmer would later publicly rue his decision to turn away from ballads. He made two more records at Bearsville: Beat of Love and The Things That You Dream. Beat of Love included the single "Suzi Found a Weapon", a tribute to a Bearsville public relations rep whom VanWarmer would later marry, and which went to No. 1 in Alaska and gained a certain amount of posthumous acclaim (for example, a review by James A. Gardner in AllMusic). Albert Grossman died soon after.

In the mid-1980s Suzi VanWarmer, his wife, mailed a song of his called "I Guess It Never Hurts to Hurt Sometimes" from Beat of Love to a friend at MCA Inc., who sent it to Ron Chancey, producer for the country group the Oak Ridge Boys, and the group put it on their next album. Charley Pride recorded a song of VanWarmer's, as did Michael Johnson. VanWarmer moved to Nashville, Tennessee in 1984. In a 1989 interview, Van Warmer said that Albert Grossman would not let him do television or tour the United States, a strategy that did not prove successful.

In 1992, the recording of his song "I'm in a Hurry (And Don't Know Why)" by the band Alabama hit No. 1 on the country chart.

VanWarmer's final album, Sings Stephen Foster, was a tribute to Stephen Foster, a leading 19th-century American composer of popular songs, but it was released posthumously, and only in Japan. According to the CD's liner notes, VanWarmer played all the instruments on the album. The notes also indicate that he completed work on the record a few days after learning he had leukemia. He died at 48, one day before the anniversary of Foster's death.

Some of VanWarmer's cremated remains were sent into space in 2007 and then again in 2012 aboard the first successful private space flight to the International Space Station.

== Death ==
VanWarmer died on January 12, 2004, at the age of 48 in Seattle. He had been suffering from leukemia the previous year.

== Discography ==
=== Albums ===
- Warmer – 1979
- Terraform – 1980
- Beat of Love – 1981
- The Things That You Dream – 1983
- I Am – 1988
- Every Now and Then – 1990
- The Third Child – 1994
- The Vital Spark – 1994 (Alternate title: I Will Whisper Your Name)
- Sun, Moon and Stars – 1996
- Sings Stephen Foster – 2005
- Songwriter – 2006

=== Singles ===
Year	Single	Chart positions							Certifications
Year	Single	US	US Country	US AC	CAN	CAN AC	UK	AUS	Certifications
1979	"Gotta Get Out of Here"	—	—	—	—	—	—	—	
1979	"Just When I Needed You Most"	4	71	1	32	5	8	17	BPI: Silver; RIAA: Gold
1980	"Call Me"	—	—	—	—	—	—	—	
1980	"Whatever You Decide"	77	—	—	—	—	—	—	
1980	"Hanging on to Heaven"	—	—	—	—	—	—	—	
1981	"Doesn't Matter Anymore"	—	—	—	—	—	—	—	
1981	"All We Have Is Tonight"	—	—	—	—	—	—	92	
1981	"Suzi Found a Weapon"	55	—	—	—	—	—	88	
1988	"I Will Hold You"	—	53	—	—	—	—	—	
1988	"Where the Rocky Mountains Touch the Morning Sun"	—	72	—	—	—	—	—	
"—" denotes releases that did not chart or were not released in that territory.
