= Adventures in Utopia =

Studio album by Utopia
- Released: December 27, 1979
- Recorded: Utopia Sound Studios (Lake Hill)
- Genres: Pop rock; progressive rock
- Length: 42:24
- Label: Bearsville
- Producers: Todd Rundgren; Utopia

Utopia chronology
Oops! Wrong Planet (1977)	Adventures in Utopia (1979)	Deface the Music (1980)

Singles from Adventures In Utopia
- 1. "Set Me Free" Released: February 1980; 2. "The Very Last Time" Released: May 1980; 3. "Second Nature" Released: 1980

Professional ratings
Review scores
Source	Rating
Allmusic	3.5/5 stars
Record Mirror	4/5 stars

Adventures in Utopia is the fourth studio album by American rock band Utopia, released on December 27, 1979, by Bearsville Records.

Mixing their earlier progressive rock style with mainstream rock, pop and disco music, Adventures in Utopia achieved success both with the band's established fan base and wider commercial success, with the track "Set Me Free" released as a single. The song became the only Top 40 single for Utopia in the United States. "Umbrella Man" was its B-side.

The by-then established Utopia line-up of Todd Rundgren, Kasim Sulton, Roger Powell and John "Willie" Wilcox wrote, performed and produced the album on their own.

According to Rundgren, the album was intended for a release date of July 6, 1979 and was seemingly finished by then, but they did not have a record company to release it until its eventual release date at the end of the year.

According to Rundgren, the album was intended to be the soundtrack for a TV show the band was working on. Even though the album was recorded in a place with video equipment, they never got around to writing or producing the TV pilot.

== Track listing ==
All tracks are written by Todd Rundgren, Roger Powell, Kasim Sulton, and Willie Wilcox.

Side one
No.	Title	Lead vocals	Length
1.	"The Road to Utopia"	Rundgren; Sulton	4:54
2.	"You Make Me Crazy"	Wilcox	3:41
3.	"Second Nature"	Rundgren	2:36
4.	"Set Me Free"	Sulton	3:09
5.	"Caravan"	Powell	7:01

Side two
No.	Title	Lead vocals	Length
6.	"Last of the New Wave Riders"	Rundgren; Sulton	4:22
7.	"Shot in the Dark"	Rundgren; Sulton	3:41
8.	"The Very Last Time"	Rundgren	3:52
9.	"Love Alone"	Sulton	3:55
10.	"Rock Love"	Rundgren	5:33

== Personnel ==
=== Utopia ===
- Todd Rundgren – vocals, guitar, saxophone (4)
- Roger Powell – vocals, keyboards
- Kasim Sulton – vocals, bass, electric piano (4)
- Willie Wilcox – vocals, drums

=== Technical ===
- Produced by Todd Rundgren and Utopia
- Engineered by Todd Rundgren
- Additional engineering – Chris Andersen, Mike Young, John Holbrook, and George Carnell
- Photography – Bob Lampel, Danny O'Connor, Jamison Goodman, and Todd Rundgren
- Album package concept – Utopia and Danny O'Connor
- Package design and production – The Creative Directors, Inc.
- Utopia logo design – John Wagman
- Management – Eric Gardner

== Charts ==
Chart (1980)	Peak position
Australia (Kent Music Report)	96
US Top LPs & Tape (Billboard)	32
