= Barbed Wire Sandwich =

Studio album by Black Cat Bones
- Released: 13 February 1970
- Recorded: May–October 1969
- Studio: Decca Studios; Tangerine Studios
- Genre: Blues rock; boogie rock
- Length: 40:47
- Label: Decca Nova
- Producer: David Hitchcock

Barbed Wire Sandwich is a heavy blues rock studio album by British band Black Cat Bones, released on 13 February 1970 by Decca on its Nova label. It is the only record by the band.

== Songs ==
"Chauffeur" is a blues rock adaptation of a song that the album credits to Andy Stroud, Nina Simone's husband and manager. Stroud had adapted Big Mama Thornton's version of Memphis Minnie's "Me and My Chauffeur Blues" of 1941 for Simone to record on her Let It All Out album of 1966. Reviewer Ben Bevan considered Black Cat Bones' recording a stand-out track, and Steve Leggett thought it one of two tracks that got into "interesting territory".

"Death Valley Blues" is another blues rock cover of a song first released in 1941, this one written by Arthur "Big Boy" Crudup. It is "a powerful cover", featuring "stellar guitar work" by lead guitarist Rod Price, according to the book Blues-rock Explosion.

"Feelin' Good" was written by English composers Anthony Newley and Leslie Bricusse in 1964 for a musical and was covered by Nina Simone on her I Put a Spell on You album of 1965. The song starts with Brian Short singing a cappella, followed by piano playing by Steve Milliner, and switching between acoustic and electric guitars. Bill Hart called it "an interesting mix of show biz blues meets hard rock" and Blues-rock Explosion rated it one of the best tracks.

"Please Tell Me Baby" covers a song by Peppermint Harris, real name Harrison D. Nelson Jr., whose name was miswritten on the record as "Harrison, Nelson". This is more a rock and roll number, with Robin Sylvester, who was the recording engineer and also a musician, contributing piano playing that accentuates its almost doo-wop swing. Steve Leggett rates this the best track.

"Coming Back", with writing credited to lead guitarist Price and the band's former vocalist Paul Tiller, continues in the rock and roll or boogie rock vein.

"Save My Love", credited to the whole band, is "swaggering hard rock blues". Reviewer Thierry Aznar considers it one of the best songs on the album.

"Four Women" is a song written by Nina Simone and released on her Wild Is the Wind album of 1966. This acoustic track is out of character with the style of the rest of the album, but Blues-rock Explosion considered it one of the best tracks.

"Sylvester's Blues", an original song written by Price, starts as an acoustic country blues before becoming a fast boogie.

"Good Lookin' Woman" is a blues rock number, also an original by Price, and the only track on which he does the singing instead of Short. Bevan considered this a second stand-out track.

== Reception ==
Professional ratings
Review scores
Source	Rating
Allmusic	3/5 stars

The British blues boom was fading by 1970 and the album did not attract great popular interest, with few copies selling. However, it was well received critically. Disc and Music Echo said the band played "with conviction and feeling". Steve Leggett was moderate in praise, calling it "well executed", "straightforward and professional" British blues.

The original vinyl record is now rare and highly sought after by collectors of rock and heavy blues music of the late 1960s and 1970s.

== Track listing ==
1. "Chauffeur" – 5:15 (Andy Stroud)
2. "Death Valley Blues" – 3:52 (Arthur "Big Boy" Crudup)
3. "Feelin' Good" – 4:58 (Anthony Newley, Leslie Bricusse)
4. "Please Tell Me Baby" – 3:10 (Harrison D. Nelson Jr.)
5. "Coming Back" – 2:32 (Rod Price, Paul Tiller)
6. "Save My Love" – 4:50 (Black Cat Bones)
7. "Four Women" – 5:09 (Nina Simone)
8. "Sylvester's Blues" – 3:45 (Price)
9. "Good Lookin' Woman" – 7:16 (Price)

== Musicians ==
Black Cat Bones

- Brian Short – lead vocals (1–8)
- Rod Price – lead guitar, lead vocals (9)
- Derek Brooks – rhythm guitar
- Stu Brooks – bass guitar
- Phil Lenoir – drums

Additional musicians

- Steve Milliner – piano (3)
- Robin Sylvester – piano (4)

Production

- Robin Sylvester – engineer at Tangerine Studios
- Peter Rynston – engineer at Decca Studios
- Dave Grinstead – engineer at Decca Studios
