= Back to the Innocence =

Jonathan Cain

Studio album by Jonathan Cain
- Released: 1995
- Recorded: Wildhorse Studios, Novato CA
- Genre: Rock
- Label: Intersound Records
- Producer: Jonathan Cain

Jonathan Cain chronology
Windy City Breakdown (1977)	Jonathan Cain (1995)	Piano With A View (1995)

Back To The Innocence is the second solo album by the keyboard player and guitarist Jonathan Cain. The song "Faithfully" is the hit single he wrote for Journey. "Just the Thought of Losing You" was co-written with Michael Bolton, an out-take from Bolton's 1987 album The Hunger, on which Cain performed.

== Track listing ==
All songs written By Jonathan Cain, except where noted.

1. "Wish That I Was There With You" (Cain, John Waite) - 4:12
2. "Waiting On The Wind" - 4:20
3. "Something Sacred" (Jonathan Cain, Andre Pessis) - 4:05
4. "Full Circle" (Cain, Pessis) - 4:04
5. "Back To The Innocence" - 3:08
6. "Little River" - 3:46
7. "Faithfully" - 4:38
8. "Just The Thought Of Losing You" (Cain, Michael Bolton) - 4:23
9. "Women Never Forget" (Cain, David Mullen) - 3:45
10. "My Old Man" - 2:58
11. "Distant Shores" (Cain, Robbie Patton) - 3:55
12. "When The Spirit Comes" - 4:13
13. "Baptism Day" - 4:07

== European import track listing ==
1. "Something Sacred"
2. "Full Circle"
3. "Hometown Boys"
4. "Back To The Innocence"
5. "Summer Of Angry Son"
6. "What The Gypsy Said"
7. "Women Never Forget"
8. "My Old Man"
9. "The Great Divide"
10. "When The Spirit Comes"
11. "Family Hand-Me-Downs"
12. "The Waiting Years"
13. "Distant Shores"
14. "Little River"

== Personnel ==
- Jonathan Cain – vocals, keyboards, Yamaha C7 concert grand piano, acoustic guitar (1, 2, 7, 8), rhythm guitar (1), bass (1, 8), 12-string acoustic guitar (6), guitars (12)
- Neal Schon – electric guitar solo (1), electric guitar (13)
- Steve Cornell – slide guitar (2)
- Lyle Workman – guitars (3, 4, 9-13), acoustic guitar (13)
- Glenn Letsch – bass (2, 4, 6, 7, 9, 13)
- Mario Cippolina – bass (3)
- Myron Dove – bass (10, 11, 12)
- Tommy "Mugs" Cain – drums (1, 2, 4, 7, 8, 9, 13)
- Steve Smith – drums (3, 6, 10, 12)
- Loralee Christiansen – backing vocals (3, 12)
- Marisa Kerry – backing vocals (3, 12)
- Annie Stocking – backing vocals (3, 12)
- Sandy Cressman – backing vocals (4, 9, 13)
- Jenny Meltzer – backing vocals (4, 9, 13)
- Becky West – backing vocals (4, 9, 13)
- Rolf Hartley – backing vocals (10)

== Production ==
- Jonathan Cain – producer, arrangements, engineer, mixing
- Wally Buck – engineer
- Dale Everingham – engineer
- Mark Needham – engineer
- Joseph Mihalko – mix assistant
- Steve Markeson – mastering at Precision Mastering (Hollywood, California)
- Ken Wells – art direction
- Marti Griffin – photography
