= In a Good Place Now: The Life & Music of Bobby Charles =

- Directed by: David Dubos
- Produced by: David Dubos, Charles Sonnier
- Starring: Dr. John, Allen Toussaint, Clarence "Frogman" Henry, Delbert McClinton, Sonny Landreth, Geoff Muldaur, Amos Garrett, Jonathan Taplin. Michael Doucet, Jim Colegrove, Warren Storm, Mickey Raphael
- Cinematography: Lenny Delbert, Gabe Mayhan, Oley Sassone
- Edited by: David Dubos
- Production company: MTH Productions
- Distributed by: Copiapoa Film Inc. (Japan)
- Release date: May 9, 2024 (U.S.)
- Running time: 73 minutes
- Country: United States
- Language: English

In a Good Place Now: The Life & Music of Bobby Charles is an American documentary film about Bobby Charles, a singer songwriter from Abbeville, Louisiana. It was directed by David Dubos and was released in the United States in 2024.

== Overview ==
Bobby Charles was a singer songwriter born in Abbeville, Louisiana in 1938. His record debut was in 1955 when he released See You Later, Alligator on Chess Records. Some more recordings and hits came thereafter.

The film tells the story of Charles' life, his early success in the 1950s as a songwriter and also as a recording artist, his appearance at The Last Waltz concert organized by the Band, and his subsequent self-imposed exile to his small town. Charles' sister, childhood friends, and musicians who played with him tell the stories from their points of view, revealing the life and personality of Bobby Charles.

The film premiered at the Louisiana Immersive Technologies Enterprise (LITE), in Lafayette, Louisiana, U.S.A. on May 9, 2024.

It was first screened in Japan at Peter Barakan's Music Film Festival 2024 which started on September 6, 2024, and then it was shown as a single 2-week run at Yebisu Garden Cinema in Tokyo.
