= Norma Jean (album) =

Studio album by Norma Jean Wright
- Released: July 1978
- Recorded: 1978
- Studio: Power Station, New York City
- Genre: Disco; funk; R&B; jazz; samba
- Length: 34:38
- Label: Bearsville; Sequel
- Producer: Nile Rodgers; Bernard Edwards

Professional ratings
Review scores
Source	Rating
AllMusic	3/5 stars

Norma Jean is the debut, and only, solo studio album by American R&B singer Norma Jean Wright, released on Bearsville Records in 1978. The album was produced by Bernard Edwards and Nile Rodgers of the band Chic, and was the project directly following the band's successful self-titled debut album Chic, which featured Wright on vocals.

Norma Jean includes the singles "Saturday", a US R&B Top 20 hit (#15) in July 1978, "Having a Party" and "Sorcerer", and was followed by non-album single "High Society" (R&B #19, January 1980), also produced by the Chic team. Another track from the album, "I Like Love", was later sampled in Solitaire's 2004 single "I Like Love (I Love Love)".

The album was reissued on CD with five bonus tracks by Sequel Records in 2000. The CD was soon out of print and commanded high prices on the collectors' market until reissued again in 2011 with the 7" versions of "Sorcerer" and "Having a Party" added.

The album's best-known original song is "Saturday", which besides being a club hit in its own right, has produced charting cover versions by East 57th St featuring Donna Allen (1997, UK #29), Joey Negro featuring Taka Boom (2000, UK #41) and 100% featuring Jennifer John (2004, UK #28). A remixed version of the song also serves as the theme music for British entertainment show Saturday Night Takeaway

== Track listing ==
All tracks written by Bernard Edwards and Nile Rodgers unless otherwise noted.
Side A:

1. "Saturday" (Bobby Carter, Edwards, Rodgers) – 6:06
2. "Having a Party" (Sam Cooke) – 4:31
3. "I Believe in You" (Chris Dawkins, Norman Whitehead) – 5:13

Side B:

1. "Sorcerer" – 5:01
2. "So I Get Hurt Again" – 4:50
3. "This Is the Love" (Denzil Miller, Norma Jean Wright) – 3:09
4. "I Like Love" – 5:48

Bonus tracks 2000 CD reissue:

1. "Hold Me Lonely Boy" – 3:40
2. "High Society" (12" Mix) – 6:09
3. "Saturday Nite" (Single Mix) – 3:28
4. "Sorcerer" (12" Mix) – 7:15
5. "Having a Party" (12" Mix) (Sam Cooke) – 5:45

== Personnel ==
- Norma Jean Wright – lead vocals, background vocals
- Luther Vandross – background vocals
- David Lasley – background vocals
- Alfa Anderson – background vocals
- Robin Clark – background vocals
- Diva Gray – background vocals
- Bernard Edwards – bass guitar, background vocals
- Nile Rodgers – guitars, background vocals
- Kenny Lehman – woodwinds
- Tony Thompson – drums
- David Friedman – tubular bells, vibraphone
- Robert Sabino – keyboards
- Andy Schwartz – keyboards
- Tom Coppola – keyboards
- George Young – flute, tenor saxophone
- Vito Rendace – flute, tenor saxophone
- Jon Faddis – trumpet
- Barry Rogers – trombone
- Sammy Figueroa – percussion
- Alfred Brown – strings contractor
- Gloria Agostini – harp
- Gene Orloff – string conductor

=== Production ===
- Bernard Edwards – record producer
- Nile Rodgers – producer
- Bob Clearmountain – engineer
- Marc Kreiner, Tom Cossie – executive production
- Norman Seeff – photography
