= Black Cat Bones =

British heavy blues rock band

- Origin: London, England
- Genre: Blues rock
- Years active: 1966–1970
- Label: Decca
- Spinoffs: Free; Leaf Hound
- Past members: Paul Tiller; Paul Kossoff; Derek Brooks; Stuart Brooks; Terry Sims; Frank Perry; Simon Kirke; Brian Short; Rod Price; Phil Lenoir; Bob Weston; Pete French; Mick Halls

Black Cat Bones were a British heavy blues rock band that existed with various lineups from 1966 to 1970, when they became Leaf Hound.

The band had English musicians Paul Kossoff and Simon Kirke in its lineup, both of whom later helped form Free in 1968 with Paul Rodgers and Andy Fraser; Kirke and Rodgers then helped found the more successful British rock supergroup Bad Company in 1974. Rod Price was the guitarist on the band's only album, Barbed Wire Sandwich, released in 1970, and went on to play in Foghat. Other members went on to play in Shagrat, Atomic Rooster, Cactus and Fleetwood Mac.

== History ==
Black Cat Bones formed in London in 1966 with members Paul Tiller (lead vocals and harmonica), Paul Kossoff (lead guitar), brothers Derek Brooks (rhythm guitar) and Stuart Brooks (bass guitar) (born January 1951, Hertfordshire), and Terry Sims (drums). The band was named after black cat bones, a Hoodoo charm associated with blues music. There were several personnel changes early on, with Terry Sims being replaced by drummer Frank Perry, who was in turn replaced in early 1968 by drummer Simon Kirke. The band played regularly on the London pub circuit. Paul Tiller was later replaced by vocalist Brian Short. At the suggestion of Mike Vernon, owner of the Blue Horizon blues record label, Kossoff, Kirke and Stuart Brooks backed veteran blues pianist Champion Jack Dupree on his 1968 album When You Feel the Feeling You Was Feeling, and played on his concurrent UK tour. Kossoff and Kirke left the band soon after.

Guitarist Rod Price and drummer Phil Lenoir replaced Kossoff and Kirke. Along with Short and the Brooks brothers, they recorded Barbed Wire Sandwich, the band's only album. It was recorded at Tangerine Studios and Decca Studios, and released in February 1970 on Decca's newly launched Nova label dedicated to progressive rock music. When the album failed to win the band critical acclaim, Short, Price and Lenoir left the band, effectively ending its existence.

Short went on to create a solo album entitled Anything for a Laugh in 1971, which also failed to win critical acclaim. Remaining band members Derek and Stuart Brooks were joined by vocalist Pete French and guitarist Mick Halls from the Brunning Sunflower Blues Band; after adding drummer Keith George Young, the outfit became the hard rock band Leaf Hound in 1970. Also in 1970, Lenoir joined Steve Peregrin Took's band Shagrat. Rod Price later went on to become the guitarist in Foghat from December 1970. Pete French joined Atomic Rooster and later Cactus with the remnants of Vanilla Fudge. Mick Halls played for many years on the British blues circuit and later moved to California. Bob Weston, later of Fleetwood Mac, also spent time in the band.

== Discography ==
- Barbed Wire Sandwich (1970)
