= Air Pocket =

Air Pocket may refer to:

- Air pocket, a local difference in air pressure in the atmosphere, potentially causing vertical draft
- Air Pocket (album), a 1980 album by Roger Powell
- Air Pocket (band), a jazz fusion band founded by the Fowler brothers
- Focal lung pneumatosis
