= Runt (album) =

- Reissue cover

Studio album by Runt
- Released: September 1970
- Studio: Bearsville (Woodstock)
- Genre: Pop rock; hard rock
- Length: 40:20
- Label: Ampex
- Producer: Todd Rundgren

Todd Rundgren chronology
Runt (1970)	Runt. The Ballad of Todd Rundgren (1971)

Singles from Runt
- 1. "We Got to Get You a Woman" Released: October 1970

Professional ratings
Review scores
Source	Rating
AllMusic	4.5/5 stars
Christgau's Record Guide	B
Rolling Stone	(Not Rated)

Runt is the debut studio album by American musician Todd Rundgren, under the band name Runt, released in September 1970 by Ampex Records. Runt was a trio consisting of Rundgren (guitars, keyboards, vocals), Hunt Sales (drums), and Tony Sales (bass). The entire album was written and produced by Rundgren, formerly of Nazz, and he performed most of the instruments.

The album features the single "We Got to Get You a Woman", which reached No. 20 on Billboard's Hot 100 in January 1971. A month later, the album peaked at No. 185 on the Billboard 200.

== Recording ==
The first album recording session was at I.D. Sound in Los Angeles with Electric Prunes singer Jim Lowe engineering. Rundgren then moved the project to New York City's Record Plant, with Jack Adams engineering. All voices and most instruments were performed by Rundgren, with occasional contributions from Runt members Hunt and Tony Sales, along with various session musicians including Rick Danko, Levon Helm, Mark Klingman, John Miller, and three members of the American Dream. The album was mixed at the first Record Plant in New York, the second Record Plant in Los Angeles, and Jack Clement Studio in Nashville. Mastering was by Sterling Sound in New York.

== Releases ==
Ampex Records first issued the album in 1970 as a promotional release with 10 tracks, intended only for radio deejays. The general public release was in September. The single "We Got to Get You a Woman" entered the Billboard Hot 100 at No. 92 in mid-November 1970, then climbed to its peak of No. 20 at the end of January 1971.

Ampex decided to press more copies of the LP in November 1970. A 12-track master of the LP, which Rundgren had rejected in favor of a second mix, was accidentally sent to the pressing plant, resulting in approximately 5,000 mis-presses, which were sold despite the mistake. There was also an 11-track version which has the standard 6 tracks on Side One and 5 tracks on Side Two featuring The full length version of "Baby Let's Swing" and "Say No More". This version may have been pressed in even smaller numbers. This album as well as Runt: The Ballad of Todd Rundgren were issued in 1971 on the Bearsville label, being distributed by Ampex at the time. In mid-1971 Bearsville was purchased by Warner Bros. distribution, and plans were made to re-release each album with Runt as catalog number BV 2046 and Ballad as BV 2047. These were never pressed. Later in 1973 Warner Bros urged Bearsville to re-release both albums as a "twin pack" entitled Todd Rundgren's Rack Job (Catalog number 2BV 2156). The album got as far as test presses and album art but was shelved, as Rundgren preferred to release an album of new material instead.

In 2023 Rhino Entertainment and Bearsville Records released a previously unknown and unheard alternate mix of the album that contained full length versions of the songs "Baby Let's Swing", "The Last Thing You Said", and "Don't Tie My Hands". It was released on a red-colored vinyl with a red 45 RPM single of "We Got to Get You a Woman" B/W "Baby Let's Swing Medley". Pressings were limited to 2500 copies.

== Track listing ==
All songs by Todd Rundgren.

Side one

1. "Broke Down and Busted" – 4:32
2. "Believe in Me" – 2:04
3. "We Got to Get You a Woman" – 2:52
4. "Who's That Man" – 2:59
5. "Once Burned" – 2:09
6. "Devil's Bite" – 3:53

Side two

1. "I'm in the Clique" – 4:57
2. "There Are No Words" – 2:12
3. "Baby Let's Swing"/"The Last Thing You Said"/"Don't Tie My Hands" – 5:28
4. "Birthday Carol" – 9:14

=== 12-track mispressed vinyl release, November 1970 ===
Side one

1. "Broke Down and Busted" – 4:59 (same as standard version but with short intro from "There Are No Words")
2. "Believe in Me" – 2:01 (alternate mix)
3. "We Got to Get You a Woman" – 3:07 (alternate mix)
4. "Once Burned" – 2:09 (same as standard version)
5. "Who's That Man?" – 2:59 (same as standard version)
6. "Hope I'm Around" – 4:28 (not on standard version, but an alternate version was included on his second album)
7. "Devil's Bite" – 3:58 (alternate mix with extended guitar solo)

Side two

1. "I'm in the Clique" – 4:57 (same as standard version)
2. "There Are No Words" – 2:12 (same as standard version)
3. "Baby Let's Swing" – 3:25 (full length song, not part of a medley)
4. "Say No More" – 3:08 (not on standard version)
5. "Birthday Carol" – 9:11 (partially the same as standard version, but with some brief alterations)

There were also two early issues on cassette with alternate track listings. The first issue was the 1970 Ampex release which reverses Sides One and Two of the LP, in order to sequence the longer side first. The second issue was the 1971 Bearsville Ampex release which has a radically different track listing as well as edited versions of "Devil's Bite", "Broke Down and Busted", "I'm in the Clique", "There are No Words", "Birthday Carol" and has the medley split in two.

=== Expanded reissue ===
In 2011 reissue label Edsel released an expanded compilation of Runt and Runt: The Ballad of Todd Rundgren that included the eight long-out-of-print alternate versions of songs from the 12-track misprint as bonus tracks. In 2014 Edsel issued Runt + The Alternative Runt, a double CD set that contained the original Runt on the first disc, the November 1970 misprint on the second disc, and "Broke Down and Busted (live at Carnegie Hall, June 8, 1972)" as a bonus track.

=== Rhino Red Edition, 2023 ===
All songs are previously unreleased alternate mixes/extended versions.

Side one

1. "Devil's Bite"
2. "Believe in Me"
3. "We Got to Get You a Woman"
4. "Once Burned"
5. "Who's That Man"
6. "Hope I'm Around"
7. "Broke Down and Busted"

Side two

1. "I'm in the Clique"
2. "There Are No Words"
3. "Baby Let's Swing" (full-length song)
4. "The Last Thing You Said" (full-length song)
5. "Don't Tie My Hands" (full-length song)
6. "Say No More"
7. "Birthday Carol"

7-inch single

- "We Got to Get You a Woman" b/w "Baby Let's Swing Medley"

== Personnel ==
Runt

- Todd Rundgren – production, arrangements, all instruments and voices except where indicated
- Tony Sales – bass (except on "Once Burned", "I'm in the Clique", and "Birthday Carol"), percussion on "We Got to Get You a Woman" and "Devil's Bite"
- Hunt Sales – drums (except on "Once Burned", "I'm in the Clique", and "Birthday Carol"), percussion on "We Got to Get You a Woman" and "Devil's Bite"

Additional musicians

- Rick Danko – bass on "Once Burned"
- Levon Helm – drums on "Once Burned"
- Mark Klingman – electric piano on "I'm in the Clique"
- John Miller – bass on "I'm in the Clique"
- Bobby Moses – drums on "I'm in the Clique"
- Don Lee van Winkle – rhythm & acoustic guitar on "Birthday Carol"
- Don Ferris – bass on "Birthday Carol"
- Mickey Brook – drums on "Birthday Carol"

== Charts ==
1971 weekly chart performance for Runt
Chart (1971)	Peak position
US Billboard Top LPs	185
US Record World Album Chart	101

Singles

Year	Single	Chart	Position
1970	"We Got to Get You a Woman"	Canada RPM Singles Chart	20
1970	"We Got to Get You a Woman"	Billboard Hot 100	20
