= Fool for the City =

Studio album by Foghat
- Released: 15 September 1975
- Studios: Suntreader Studios, Sharon, Vermont
- Genres: Hard rock; blues rock
- Length: 35:37
- Label: Bearsville
- Producer: Nick Jameson (008)

Foghat chronology
Rock and Roll Outlaws (1974)	Fool for the City (1975)	Night Shift (1976)

Professional ratings
Review scores
Source	Rating
AllMusic	4.5/5 stars
Rolling Stone	4/5 stars

Fool for the City is the fifth studio album by English rock band Foghat, released on 15 September 1975. Featuring the band's signature song "Slow Ride", along with the title track, it was the band's first album to go platinum. It was also the first album the band recorded after the departure of original bassist Tony Stevens. Producer Nick Jameson played bass and keyboards on the album, and co-wrote the closing track, "Take It or Leave It", with Dave Peverett. Although he appeared in the photograph with the rest of the band on the back cover of the album, Jameson is not known to have toured with Foghat in support of the album. A new bassist, Craig MacGregor, was recruited shortly after the album's release, but Jameson would continue to produce and record intermittently with the band over the next couple of decades.

The LP was released with two different catalog numbers. The original was released as BR 6959. It was reissued as BRK 6980 in 1978. All issues from 1978–1984 used this catalog number. A remastered CD of the album was released by Rock Candy Records in 2019.

== Album cover ==
The album cover shows drummer Roger Earl sitting alone on a soap box fishing down a manhole near 229 East 11th Street (between 2nd and 3rd Avenue) in the East Village of Manhattan, New York City, near the address of Foghat's American office. The back cover features skeptical bystanders observing Earl's unusual activity and the other members of the band either asking him what he is doing or trying to dissuade him from it. In a 2014 interview, Earl explained how the picture was taken:

It was a Sunday morning and I hadn't slept. [...] It was Nick Jameson's idea [...] since I have this penchant for fishing. Anyway, we lift up the manhole cover and I'm sitting on a box. Almost immediately a couple of New York's Finest come by in their patrol car. They're looking at us and they wind the window down. We're like, "Oh shit." They yell out, "Hey! You got a fishing license?" and then start laughing. So they come over and say, "What the fuck are you doing?" They took some pictures with them handcuffing me. I love New York's Finest.

— Roger Earl

== Track listing ==
Side one

1. "Fool for the City" (Dave Peverett) – 4:33
2. "My Babe" (Bobby Hatfield, Bill Medley) – 4:35
3. "Slow Ride" (Peverett) – 8:14

Side two

1. "Terraplane Blues" (Robert Johnson) – 5:44
2. "Save Your Loving (For Me)" (Peverett, Rod Price) – 3:31
3. "Drive Me Home" (Peverett) – 3:54
4. "Take It or Leave It" (Peverett, Nick Jameson) – 4:49

== Personnel ==
Foghat

- Lonesome Dave Peverett – lead vocals, rhythm guitar
- Rod "The Bottle" Price – lead and acoustic guitars, slide guitar, steel guitar, vocals
- Roger Earl – drums, percussion
- Nick Jameson – bass guitar, keyboards, guitar, vocals, producer, engineer

Production

- Tony Loew – photography
- Tony Outeda – co-ordinator

== Charts ==
Chart (1975–76)	Peak position
Canada Top Albums/CDs (RPM)	85
US Billboard 200	23

== Certifications ==
Region	Certification	Certified units/sales
United States (RIAA)	Platinum	1,000,000^{^}
^{^} Shipments figures based on certification alone.
