= Bobby Charles =

American singer-songwriter (1938–2010)

- Born: Robert Charles Guidry; February 21, 1938; Abbeville, Louisiana, U.S.
- Died: January 14, 2010 (aged 71) Louisiana, U.S.
- Genres: Swamp rock, roots rock, Blue-eyed soul
- Occupation: Singer-songwriter
- Years active: 1950s–1990s
- Labels: Bearsville; Stony Plain; Proper; Rice 'n' Gravy; Chess; Imperial

Robert Charles Guidry (February 21, 1938 – January 14, 2010), known as Bobby Charles, was an American singer-songwriter.

== Early life ==
An ethnic Cajun, Charles was born in Abbeville, Louisiana, and grew up listening to Cajun music and the country and western music of Hank Williams. At the age of 15, he heard a performance by Fats Domino, an event that "changed my life forever," he recalled.

== Career and highlights ==
Charles helped to pioneer the south Louisiana musical genre known as swamp pop. His compositions include the hits "See You Later, Alligator", which he initially recorded as "Later Alligator", but which is best known from the cover version by Bill Haley & His Comets, and "Walking to New Orleans" and "It Keeps Rainin'", written for Fats Domino.

"(I Don't Know Why) But I Do" was an early 1960s song that Charles composed, which Clarence "Frogman" Henry had a major hit with, and which was on the soundtrack of the 1994 film, Forrest Gump. Junior Wells' rendition of his composition "Why Are People Like That?" was on the soundtrack of the 1998 film, Home Fries.

Because of his south Louisiana–influenced rhythm and blues vocal style, Charles sometimes has been thought to be black, when he was white.

Charles was invited to play with the Band at The Last Waltz, their November 26, 1976, farewell concert at the Winterland Ballroom in San Francisco. In the concert, Charles played "Down South in New Orleans", with the help of Dr. John and the Band. That song was recorded and released as part of the triple-LP The Last Waltz box set. The performance was captured on film by director Martin Scorsese, but did not appear in the final, released theatrical version. Charles did, however, appear briefly in a segment of the released film—in the concert's final song "I Shall Be Released". In this segment, his image is largely blocked from view during the performance. That song, sung by Bob Dylan and pianist Richard Manuel, featured backup vocals from the entire ensemble, including Charles.

He co-wrote the songs "Small Town Talk" and "New Mexico" with Rick Danko of the Band,, who co-produced his self-titled 1972 album with John Simon and Charles at Bearsville Studios. "The Truth Will Set You Free (Promises, Promises)" was co-written with Willie Nelson.

Charles continued to compose and record (he was based out of Woodstock, New York for a time) and, in 1995, he recorded a duet of "Walking to New Orleans" with Fats Domino.

In September 2020, Bob Dylan featured Charles' song "He's Got All The Whiskey" from Charles' 1972 album, Bobby Charles, on Dylan's Theme Time Radio Hour: the Whiskey episode.

A feature-length documentary film about Charles' life entitled In a Good Place Now: The Life & Music of Bobby Charles directed by David DuBos was completed and released on February 29, 2024 in the United States and September 6, 2024 in Japan.

== Honors ==
In September 2007, the Louisiana Music Hall of Fame honored Charles for his contributions to Louisiana music with an induction.

In 2005 the Museum of the Gulf Coast in Port Arthur, Texas, inducted Charles into their Music Hall of Fame, which includes over eighty artists from the Gulf Coast region, including Janis Joplin, George Jones, Tex Ritter, ZZ Top, and others.

== Death ==
Charles collapsed in his home near Abbeville and died on January 14, 2010.

== Discography ==
=== Albums ===
- Bobby Charles, 1972 (Bearsville Records)
- Clean Water, 1987 (Rice 'n' Gravy Records/Zensor Records)
- Wish You Were Here Right Now, 1994 (Rice 'n' Gravy Records)
- Secrets of the Heart, 1998 (Rice 'n' Gravy Records/Stony Plain Records)
- Last Train to Memphis, 2004 (Rice 'n' Gravy Records/Proper Records UK)
- Homemade Songs, 2008 (Rice 'n' Gravy Records)
- Timeless, 2010 (Rice 'n' Gravy Records)
- Better Days: Rare Tracks On Bearsville, 2011 (Bearsville Records) – Recorded 1974
- Bearsville Studio Sessions, 2025 (Bearsville Records/Rhino Records)

== Sources ==
- John Broven, South to Louisiana: Music of the Cajun Bayous (Gretna, La.: Pelican Press, 1983). ISBN 9780882893006
- Shane K. Bernard, Swamp Pop: Cajun and Creole Rhythm and Blues (Jackson: University Press of Mississippi, 1996). ISBN 978-0878058754
