= Bobby Charles (album) =

Studio album by Bobby Charles
- Released: c. September 1972
- Studio: Bearsville Studios
- Genres: Roots, rock, swamp pop
- Length: 42:52
- Label: Bearsville Records
- Producers: Bobby Charles, John Simon, Rick Danko

Bobby Charles chronology
Bobby Charles (1972)	Clean Water (1987)

Bobby Charles is the debut album by the American singer-songwriter Bobby Charles. Released in 1972 on Bearsville Records, the album was produced by Charles with John Simon and Rick Danko.

== History ==
Charles' musical career started in the 1950s as a songwriter, notably writing "See You Later Alligator" for Billy Haley & His Comets and "Walking to New Orleans", released by Fats Domino. Charles later moved from Nashville, Tennessee to Woodstock, New York, where he fell in with the local music circle which then involved The Band. Charles recorded his debut album in Bearsville Studios, a studio belonging Albert Grossman.

The album features a number of guest stars. As well as co-producing the album and co-writing the track "Small Town Talk", Danko performs on the record alongside fellow Band members Garth Hudson, Richard Manuel, and Levon Helm; however, it is thought that The Band's guitarist Robbie Robertson may have contributed to the recording, as he was also present at the sessions. Ben Keith and Dr. John are also credited on the album, but the lack of definitive song credits makes it difficult to determine how the musicians contributed to each track.

== Track listing ==
All songs were written by Bobby Charles, except where noted.

=== Side one ===
1. "Street People" – 3:44
2. "Long Face" – 3:38
3. "I Must Be in a Good Place Now" – 4:07
4. "Save Me Jesus" – 5:17
5. "He's Got All the Whiskey" – 5:17

=== Side two ===
1. "Small Town Talk" (Bobby Charles, Rick Danko) – 3:29
2. "Let Yourself Go" – 4:13
3. "Grow Too Old" (B. Charles, David Louis Bartholomew, Fats Domino) – 4:03
4. "I'm That Way" – 4:04
5. "Tennessee Blues" – 5:29

== Personnel ==
- Bobby Charles - lead vocals, piano, production
- Amos Garrett - acoustic and electric guitars
- Ben Keith - pedal steel guitar
- Billy Mundi - drums
- Bugsy Maugh - bass
- David Sanborn - alto saxophone
- Garth Hudson - organ
- Geoff Muldaur - acoustic guitar
- Harry Lookofsky - trombone
- Hymie Schertzer - horns
- Jim Colegrove - bass
- Joe Newman - horns
- John Simon - piano, production
- John Till - acoustic guitar
- Levon Helm - drums
- Mac Rebenack - keyboards, piano, guitar
- Norman D. Smart - drums
- Paul Butterfield - harmonica (uncredited)
- Richard Manuel - piano
- Mark Harmon - engineer
