= Bearsville Records =

- Founded: 1970
- Founder: Albert Grossman
- Defunct: 1984
- Status: Defunct
- Distributor: Rhino Records
- Genre: Various
- Country of origin: U.S.

Bearsville Records is a record label that was founded in 1970 by Albert Grossman. The label closed in 1984, two years before Grossman's death. Sally Grossman, Albert Grossman’s widow, was running Bearsville Records from 2010 until her death in March 2021, at the age of 81.

Bearsville's initial distributor was Ampex Records. From 1972 until its folding, the label was distributed by Warner Bros. Records in most countries. Paul Fishkin was the president of Bearsville from 1971 to 1979. In 1978, Bearsville relocated their national headquarters to Los Angeles while keeping their offices in Bearsville, New York and New York City. In the UK it was distributed by Warner until 1979, and then Island until 1981. Its last few British releases were licensed to independent labels Avatar and Lamborghini. Bearsville Records ceased active operations in 1985. Rhino Records currently distributes Bearsville catalog.

Many of the artists on the roster recorded at Grossman's Bearsville Studios, in the similarly named hamlet in Woodstock, New York.

== Artists ==
- Elizabeth Barraclough
- Paul Butterfield
- Jonathan Cain
- Felix Cavaliere
- Bobby Charles
- The dB's
- Foghat
- Jesse Frederick
- Halfnelson
- Nick Jameson
- Norma Jean Wright
- Lazarus
- Liar
- Willie Mitchell
- NRBQ
- Roger Powell
- Todd Rundgren
- Sparks
- Utopia
- Randy Vanwarmer
- Jesse Winchester

== Discography ==
=== 1970 (under AMPEX distribution) ===
- The American Dream - The American Dream
- Gil Evans - Gil Evans
- Great Speckled Bird - Great Speckled Bird
- Jesse Winchester - Jesse Winchester
- Todd Rundgren - Runt 1005

=== 1971 ===
- Jericho - Jericho
- Todd Rundgren - Runt. The Ballad of Todd Rundgren 10116

Switched from AMPEX distribution to Warner Bros. using Reprise Records 2000 catalog number sequence.

- Jesse Frederick - Jesse Frederick This was the first album to be released by Bearsville under Warner Bros. distribution. This release was a Bearsville / Reprise records release as noted on the back cover but used a Bearsville label on the LP.
- Lazarus - Lazarus

=== 1972 ===
- Sparks - Half Nelson
- Todd Rundgren - Something/Anything? 2BX 2066
- Hungry Chuck - Hungry Chuck BR 2701
- Foghat - Foghat BR 2077
- Jesse Winchester - Third Down, 110 to Go B4 2102
- Bobby Charles - Bobby Charles BR 2104
- Paul Butterfield - Better Days BR 2119

=== 1973 ===
- Sparks - A Woofer in Tweeter's Clothing BR 2110
- Todd Rundgren - A Wizard, A True Star BR 2133
- Lazarus - A Fool's Paradise BR 2135
- Foghat - Foghat (Rock & Roll) BR 2136
- Jean Yves Labat - M. Frog BR 2140
- Paul Butterfield - It All Comes Back BR 2170
- Todd Rundgren - Todd Rundgren's Rack Job 2BV 2156 (Unreleased two record set of Rundgren's first two solo albums "Runt" and "Runt - The Ballad Of Todd Rundgren")
- Foghat - Energized BR 6950 (First Bearsville release using its own 6000 catalog number sequence)

=== 1974 ===
- Todd Rundgren - Todd 2BR 6952 (originally 2BR 2169; delayed from 1973)
- Jesse Winchester - Learn to Love it BR 6953
- Todd Rundgren - Todd Rundgren's Utopia BR 6954
- Felix Cavaliere - Felix Cavaliere BR 6955
- Foghat - Rock and Roll Outlaws BR 6956

=== 1975 ===
- Todd Rundgren - Initiation BR 6957
- Felix Cavaliere - Destiny BR 6958
- Foghat - Fool For the City BR 6959
- Paul Butterfield - Put It In Your Ear BR 6960
- Utopia - Another Live BR 6961

=== 1976 ===
- Foghat - Night Shift BR 6962
- Todd Rundgren - Faithful BR 6963
- Jesse Winchester - Let the Rough Side Drag BR 6964

=== 1977 ===
- Utopia - RA BR 6965
- Tony Wilson - I Like Your Style BR 6966
- Jesse Winchester - Nothing But a Breeze BR 6968
- Jonathan Cain Band - Windy City Breakdown BR 6969
- Utopia - Oops! Wrong Planet BR 6970
- Foghat - Foghat Live BR 6971
- Nick Jameson - Already Free BR 6972

=== 1978 ===
- Foghat - Stone Blue BRK 6977
- Foghat - Fool For The City BRK 6980 (Re Issue)
- Jesse Winchester - A Touch on the Rainy Side BRK 6984
- Todd Rundgren - Hermit of Mink Hollow BRK 6981
- Elizabeth Barraclough - Elizabeth Barraclough BRK 6978
- Liar - Set the World on Fire BRK 6982
- Norma Jean Wright - Norma Jean BRK 6983
- Todd Rundgren - Back to the Bars 2BRX 6986

=== 1979 ===
- Tony Wilson - Catch One BRK 6985
- Randy Vanwarmer - Warmer BRK 6988
- Elizabeth Barraclough - Hi! BRK 6992
- Foghat - Boogie Motel BRK 6990
- Utopia - Adventures In Utopia BRK 6991

=== 1980 ===
- Roger Powell - Air Pocket BRK 6994
- Paul Butterfield - North-South BRK 6995
- Kenny Doss - Movin' on a Feelin' BRK 6997
- Randy Vanwarmer - Terraform BRK 6998
- Foghat - Tight Shoes BRK 6999
- Pam Windo and the Shades - It BRK 3479 (First release using the Warner Bros 3000 catalog number sequence)
- Brian Briggs - Brian Damage BRK 6996
- Utopia - Deface the Music BRK 3487

=== 1981 ===
- Johnny Average Band - Some People BRK 3514
- Todd Rundgren - Healing BHS 3522
- Jesse Winchester - Talk Memphis BRK 6989
- Donald O'Conner - Come Alive BRK 3521
- Willie Mitchell - Listen Dance BRK 3520
- Randy Vanwarmer - Beat of Love BRK 3561
- Foghat - Girls to Chat and Boys to Bounce BRK 3578

=== 1982 ===
- Brian Briggs - Combat Zone BRK 3627
- Utopia - Swing To The Right BRK 3666
- Todd Rundgren - The Ever Popular Tortured Artist Effect 23732 (First release to use the 5 digit Warner Bros. number sequence)
- Foghat - In The Mood for Something Rude 23747

=== 1983 ===
- Nicole Wills - Tell Me 23656 (originally assigned as BRK 3656)
- Randy Vanwarmer - The Things That You Dream 23746
- NRBQ - Grooves in Orbit 23817
- Foghat - Zig-Zag Walk 23888

=== 1984 ===
- Human Body - Make You Shake It 23995
- Freida Parton - Two-Faced 23999
- Todd Rundgren - A Cappella 25128 (Originally slated for release in the summer of 1984 but delayed until after Bearsville folded. Released in October 1985 on the Warner Bros. label using Bearsville catalog number)
- The dB's - Like This 25146

== See also ==
- Bearsville Studios
