= We Got to Get You a Woman =

Single by Todd Rundgren

from the album Runt
- B-side: "Baby, Let's Swing / The Last Thing You Said / Don't Tie My Hands"
- Released: October 1970
- Recorded: 1970
- Studio: Bearsville Studios in Bearsville, New York
- Genre: Power pop; pop rock; soft rock
- Length: 3:05
- Label: Ampex Records
- Songwriter: Todd Rundgren
- Producer: Todd Rundgren

Todd Rundgren singles chronology
"We Got to Get You a Woman" (1970)	"Be Nice to Me" (1971)

"We Got to Get You a Woman" (also styled "We Gotta Get You a Woman") is a 1970 song originally performed and written by Todd Rundgren from the 1970 album Runt.

== Background ==
"We Got to Get You a Woman" was inspired by Rundgren's friend, music executive Paul Fishkin, who later promoted the song and Rundgren. It refers to the two's "post-hanging days" in Greenwich Village. In the song, Rundgren tells his friend Leroy, “We gotta get you a woman / It’s like nothin’ else to make you feel sure you’re alive.” Robert Rodi thought the song was "ridiculously catchy" but criticized its depiction of women. Rundgren explained that the line "They may be stupid but they sure are fun" was widely misunderstood as misogynistic; he claimed that it was, rather, referring to "stupid little characteristics that people have—funny little quirks and stuff like that."

== Chart performance ==
"We Got to Get You a Woman" was Rundgren's first hit, peaking at No. 20 on the U.S. Billboard Hot 100 for three consecutive weeks from January 30 to February 13, 1971.However, despite the success, he rarely performed the song in concert. He did perform it during most concerts of his 2019 "Individualist" tour.

1970–1971 singles charts
Chart	Peak
Canadian RPM 100 Singles	20
US Billboard Hot 100	20
US Cash Box Top 100	21
US Record World Singles Chart	17
