= Felix Cavaliere =

American musician (born 1942)

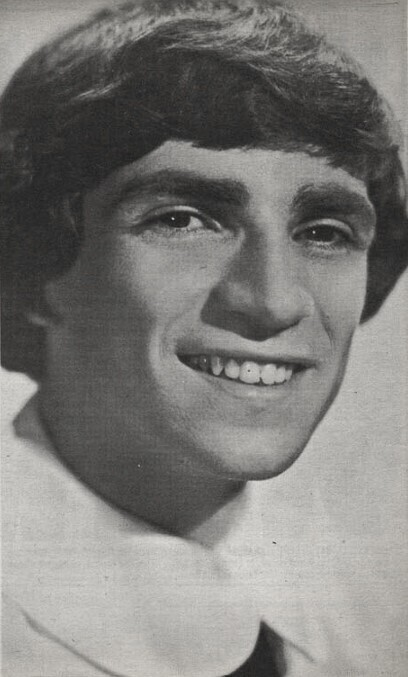
- Cavaliere in 1966

Background information
- Born: November 29, 1942 (age 83); Pelham, New York, U.S.
- Genres: Rock, soul, soft rock
- Occupation: Musician
- Instruments: Vocals; keyboards
- Years active: 1965–present
- Labels: Bearsville, Wounded Bird, MCA, Stax
- Website: www.felixcavalieremusic.com

Felix Cavaliere (born November 29, 1942) is an American musician. He is best known for being the co-lead vocalist and keyboard player for The Young Rascals.

Although he was a member of Joey Dee and the Starliters, known for their hit "Peppermint Twist", he is best known for his association with the Young Rascals during the 1960s. The other members of the Rascals were Eddie Brigati, Dino Danelli and Gene Cornish. Cavaliere sang vocals on six of their successful singles and played the Hammond B-3 organ.

== Early life and education ==
Cavaliere was born to an Italian-American family in Pelham, New York on November 29, 1942. At an early age, he studied piano at the Allaire School of Music at his mother's behest from age 6 until her death when he was 14. He enrolled at Syracuse University in the early 1960s as a pre-med major and performed at fraternity and sorority parties with his band The Escorts. At the beginning of his junior year, he left Syracuse to pursue an opportunity to be a musician at a Borscht Belt resort in the Catskills. He was friends with poet and songwriter Stephen Kalinich, and they both were in the Sigma Phi Epsilon fraternity.

== Career ==
He joined The Stereos, and moved on to form The Escorts, while attending Syracuse. He later produced albums by other artists such as Laura Nyro and Jimmie Spheeris.

Between 1965 and 1972, Cavaliere played keyboards and sang for The Young Rascals and The Rascals. They achieved three US #1 hits.

Following a pair of solo efforts, Cavaliere recorded under the band name Treasure and released a self-titled AOR-styled album in 1977 which featured future Kiss member Vinnie Vincent on guitar. Cavaliere had a solo hit with "Only a Lonely Heart Sees" (1980), which reached No. 36 on the Billboard Hot 100 chart and No. 2 on the Adult Contemporary chart. Cavaliere and former Rascals bandmate Dino Danelli joined Steve Van Zandt to record Little Steven and the Disciples of Soul's album, Men Without Women (1982). However, Cavaliere strongly disputes this and claims that he was never a member of Little Steven's band.

He recorded Dreams in Motion in 1994, produced by Don Was. During 1995, Cavaliere was a touring member of Ringo Starr's third All-Starr Band. Cavaliere can be seen playing keyboard in the official video for "Hey Girl" by Billy Joel, a cover version of the Carole King song, recorded by Billy Joel in 1997 to add to his Greatest Hits Volume III compilation. The track was released as a single, but Cavaliere was not playing on the recording.

On October 15, 2006, he inducted Vanilla Fudge into the Long Island Music Hall of Fame. In 2008, he recorded an album with Steve Cropper, Nudge it Up a Notch, which was released July 29, 2008. He continues to tour as Felix Cavaliere's Rascals. On April 24, 2010, all four members of the Rascals reunited for the Kristen Ann Carr benefit, which was held at New York's Tribeca Grill.

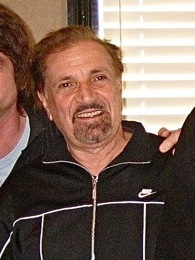
Cavaliere in 2009

Cavaliere reunited with his bandmates when the Rascals appeared at the Capitol Theater in Port Chester, New York, for six shows in December 2012 and for fifteen dates at the Richard Rodgers Theatre on Broadway (April 15 – May 5, 2013). Their production, entitled "Once Upon A Dream", toured North America (Toronto, Los Angeles, Phoenix, Chicago, Detroit, Rochester, and New York City). It was produced by longtime Rascals fans Steven Van Zandt and his wife Maureen.

He appeared with Billy Joel at Madison Square Garden on May 28, 2015.

In 2017 and 2018, Cavaliere was a spokesperson in a television infomercial for the Time Life The 60s Music CD collection.

== Awards and honors ==
In 1993, Cavaliere was inducted into the Syracuse Area Music Awards Hall of Fame.

In 1997, Cavaliere was inducted into the Rock and Roll Hall of Fame with the (Young) Rascals.

On June 18, 2009, Cavaliere, along with former writing partner Eddie Brigati, was inducted into the Songwriters Hall of Fame for having "changed the direction of pop music in 1965".

In 2014, he was inducted into the Hammond Hall of Fame.

Cavaliere was inducted into the Musicians Hall of Fame and Museum in 2019.

== Personal life ==
Cavaliere was married to Mary Theresa (Thompson) Cavaliere for 30 years and had three daughters with her. Cavaliere's daughter, Aria Cavaliere, is a singer based in Nashville, Tennessee. He also has four grandchildren. He lives in Nashville, with his current wife Donna Lewis.

== Discography ==
=== Albums ===
| Year | Title | Label | Chart positions | |
| Year | Title | Label | US Heat | US R&B |
|---|---|---|---|---|
| 1974 | Felix Cavaliere | Bearsville | - | - |
| 1975 | Destiny | Bearsville | - | - |
| 1977 | Treasure | Epic | - | - |
| 1979 | Castles in the Air | Epic | - | - |
| 1994 | Dreams in Motion | MCA | - | - |
| 2008 | Nudge It Up a Notch | Stax | - | 100 |
| 2010 | Midnight Flyer | Stax | 32 | - |
| 2023 | Then & Now | Atisha II | - | - |

=== Singles ===
| Year | Title | Chart positions | |
| Year | Title | US | US AC |
|---|---|---|---|
| 1975 | "Never Felt Love Before" | - | - |
| 1980 | "Only a Lonely Heart Sees" | 36 | 2 |
| 1980 | "Good to Have Love Back" | 105 | 41 |
