= Faithful (Todd Rundgren album) =

Studio album by Todd Rundgren
- Released: May 1976
- Genres: Pop rock; psychedelic rock; power pop
- Length: 50:04
- Labels: Bearsville; Rhino
- Producer: Todd Rundgren

Todd Rundgren chronology
Initiation (1975)	Faithful (1976)	Hermit of Mink Hollow (1978)

Singles from Faithful
- 1. "Good Vibrations" Released: May 1976; 2. "Love of the Common Man" Released: June 25, 1976

Professional ratings
Review scores
Source	Rating
AllMusic	3.5/5 stars
Christgau's Record Guide	B
Rolling Stone	(Not rated)

Faithful is the seventh studio album by the American musician Todd Rundgren, released in May 1976 by Bearsville Records.

== Music ==
Rundgren explained the motivation of the first side as treating rock music like European classical music, where a piece is always performed in the same way. Rundgren is backed on the album by the other three members of Utopia: Roger Powell on keyboards, John Siegler on bass, and John Wilcox on drums.

The first side is mostly dedicated to "faithful" re-recordings of songs from 1966, while side two contains original songs inspired by music of that time period. Critic Robert Christgau called the second side Rundgren's "clearest and most interesting set of songs since Something/Anything?".

The closing song, "Boogies (Hamburger Hell)", opens with a reference to restaurant chain Beefsteak Charlie's, which former Utopia drummer Kevin Ellman was operating along with his family at the time.

== Release ==
The album was released in May 1976 with virtually no advertising, as Bearsville president Paul Fishkin believed that Rundgren fans would purchase it based solely on word of mouth. The Rundgren original "Love of the Common Man" and his cover of the Beach Boys' "Good Vibrations" were released as singles, the latter peaking at number 34 on the Billboard Pop Singles chart. The album peaked at number 54 on the Billboard album chart.

== Track listing ==
All tracks are written by Todd Rundgren, except where noted.

Side one
No.	Title	Writer(s)	Length
1.	"Happenings Ten Years Time Ago"	Jeff Beck, Jim McCarty, Jimmy Page, Keith Relf	3:12
2.	"Good Vibrations"	Brian Wilson, Mike Love	3:44
3.	"Rain"	Lennon–McCartney	3:16
4.	"Most Likely You Go Your Way and I'll Go Mine"	Bob Dylan	3:24
5.	"If Six Was Nine"	Jimi Hendrix	4:55
6.	"Strawberry Fields Forever"	Lennon–McCartney	3:53

Side two
No.	Title	Length
7.	"Black and White"	4:42
8.	"Love of the Common Man"	3:35
9.	"When I Pray"	2:58
10.	"Cliché"	4:00
11.	"The Verb 'To Love'"	7:25
12.	"Boogies (Hamburger Hell)"	5:00
Total length:		50:04

== Personnel ==
=== Musicians ===
- Todd Rundgren – vocals, electric guitar, acoustic guitar, all instruments (9)
- Roger Powell – keyboards, trumpet, electric guitar (5)
- John Siegler – bass, cello
- John Wilcox – drums

=== Technical ===
- Produced and engineered by Todd Rundgren
- Mastered by Allen Landau at Sterling Sound (New York, NY)

== Charts ==
=== Weekly charts ===
Year	Chart	Position
1976	Billboard Pop Albums	54

=== Single ===
Year	Single	Chart	Position
1976	"Good Vibrations"	Canada RPM Singles Chart	28
1976	"Good Vibrations"	Billboard Pop Singles	34
1976	"Good Vibrations"	Billboard Adult Contemporary	32
