= Runt. The Ballad of Todd Rundgren =

Album by Todd Rundgren

Studio album by Runt
- Released: May 1971
- Recorded: Bearsville (Woodstock)
- Genre: Pop rock; soft rock; blue-eyed soul
- Length: 42:05
- Label: Ampex, Bearsville
- Producer: Todd Rundgren

Todd Rundgren chronology
Runt (1970)	Runt. The Ballad of Todd Rundgren (1971)	Something/Anything? (1972)

Singles from Runt. The Ballad of Todd Rundgren
- 1. "Be Nice to Me" Released: March 1971; 2. "A Long Time, A Long Way to Go" Released: August 1971

Professional ratings
Review scores
Source	Rating
Allmusic	5/5 stars
Christgau's Record Guide	B
Rolling Stone	(Not Rated)

Runt. The Ballad of Todd Rundgren is the second studio album by American musician Todd Rundgren, released on May 1971 by Ampex Records and Bearsville Records. Like its predecessor, Runt, this album was credited to Rundgren's group Runt, despite Rundgren handling most of the musicianship and production himself.

== Content ==
Most of the album's 12 tracks are piano-led ballads, with the only exceptions being the rock tunes "Bleeding" and "Parole" and the anthem "Chain Letter". As with his first album, this album was initially credited to "Runt". Rundgren himself wrote, arranged, and produced every tune on The Ballad of Todd Rundgren, as well as handling all the guitars, keyboards, and vocals.

"I was pretty overbearing to deal with," Rundgren recalled in the liner notes to the 1999 CD release. "I was also becoming very particular about arrangements, so I took a crack at playing it all myself. But I still had some dependence on other musicians. I wasn't yet ready to play drums or to seriously address what bass playing should be like."

Tony Sales, who played bass on Runt, the previous album, plays on the majority of tracks, but brother Hunt Sales, the drummer on the first album, plays drums only on one cut and conga on one. Studio musicians Jerry Scheff and John Guerin provide the rhythm section on two tracks; Norman D. Smart, who later became a member of the Hello People and was Mountain's first drummer, plays on the remainder. On two of the tracks, Rundgren is the only performer.

The album cover was designed by Milton Glaser. Inside photographs and design were by Ron Mael.

In mid-1971, Bearsville was purchased by Warner Bros. and plans were made to re-release both Runt and Runt. The Ballad of Todd Rundgren as a "twin pack" entitled Todd Rundgren's Rack Job (Catalog Number 2BV 2156) in 1973. The album got as far as test presses and album art, but was shelved as Rundgren preferred to release an album of new material.

== Track listing ==
All songs written by Todd Rundgren.

Side one

1. "Long Flowing Robe" – 3:30
2. "The Ballad (Denny & Jean)" – 3:30
3. "Bleeding" – 4:05
4. "Wailing Wall" – 3:05
5. "The Range War" – 2:38
6. "Chain Letter" – 5:02

Side two

1. "A Long Time, A Long Way to Go" – 2:12
2. "Boat on the Charles" – 4:28
3. "Be Nice to Me" – 3:27
4. "Hope I'm Around" – 4:55
5. "Parole" – 4:22
6. "Remember Me" – 0:51

== Personnel ==
Adapted from the original album liner notes

- Todd Rundgren – vocals (all tracks), piano (1, 2, 4–10, 12), organ (6, 7, 10), pump organ (2), Clavinet (1, 11), Wurlitzer electric piano (10), EMS VCS 3 (4, 6, 9), guitars (1–3, 5–8, 10, 11), slide guitars (5), mandolins (2), fiddles (5), tenor and baritone saxophones (8), talk box (2), vibraphone (8), tom-toms (1), cabasa (1), cowbell (1, 8), tubular bells (2), maracas (3), beer can (3), bottles (3), timpani (7), gong (7), finger cymbals (8), Swiss hand bells (9), glockenspiel (9), triangle (9), sand blocks (9), tambourine (9), sleigh bells (9)
- Tony Sales – bass guitar (1–3, 5–8, 11), conga (1), tambourine (1, 8), vibraslap (8)
- Jerry Scheff – bass guitar (9, 10)
- N. D. Smart – drums (1–3, 5–8), timbales (1), maracas (8)
- John Guerin – drums (9, 10)
- Hunt Sales – drums (11), conga (8)

== Charts ==
Album

Chart (1971)	Peak position
US Billboard Bubbling Under the Top LP's	214
US Record World Album Chart	136

Singles

Year	Single	Chart	Position
1971	"Be Nice to Me"	Canada RPM 100 Singles	92
1971	"Be Nice to Me"	US Billboard Hot 100	71
1971	"Be Nice to Me"	US Cash Box Top 100	87
1971	"Be Nice to Me"	US Record World Singles Chart	59
1971	"A Long Time, a Long Way to Go"		
1971	"A Long Time, a Long Way to Go"	US Billboard Hot 100	92
1971	"A Long Time, a Long Way to Go"	US Cash Box Looking Ahead	113
1971	"A Long Time, a Long Way to Go"	US Record World Singles Chart	86
