= Hello People =

American rock band

- Genres: Rock, power pop
- Past members: Ronnie Blake; Greg Geddes; Michael Sagarese; Bobby Sedita; Larry Tasse; W. S. "Sonny" Tongue

Hello People was a rock group that was created in New York City in late 1967 by producer Lou Futterman.

== History ==
The idea for creating the group stemmed from Marcel Carné's 1945 film Children of Paradise (Les Enfants du Paradis). Etienne Decroux, the father of French mime, plays the part of Baptiste's father in the film. During the sixties, Decroux taught painting to a group of musicians. Since these musicians learned to paint so quickly, Decroux reasoned that musicians could also learn mime and apply it in some new way to create a new form. The manager of the musicians Decroux taught, Lou Futterman, decided he would implement this new concept, and put together a new group of musicians who would perform in mime makeup and do mime routines between songs, never speaking a word to the audience.

Two of the original group, Greg Geddes and Ronnie Blake, were recruited from the music department at Western Connecticut State University (called, at that time, Danbury State College). They later added Peter Weston, also from W.C.S.U. Peter and Greg sang most of the lead vocals for their 1968, second album, Fusion. Greg also contributed as recording engineer for the group, a career he later followed after ending his touring with Todd Rundgren.

The Hello People were considered an anti-war music group. They were featured on the Tonight Show (Johnny Carson) several times. On one episode they played an off-key version of the Tonight Show theme and pantomimed Carson's monologue and golf swing. Their best-known television appearance was on The Smothers Brothers Comedy Hour. "Anthem", one of their most popular tracks from their album, Fusion, was banned in several cities due to the anti-war lyrics that had made it popular.

The band were the main focus for TEAC's 1974 Homemade With TEAC LP, with the band members being interviewed about, and demonstrating their process of home recording, including overdubs and track-syncing, teaching amateur Audio Engineers how to make Home Recordings using the Teac/Tascam reel-to-reel 4-track decks. TEAC's album was released in 1974 just prior to their own album, "Handsome Devils" which contained some of the songs recorded for Teac but produced by Rundgren. The LP charted in 1974 at #145 in Billboard. The 1975 single from that album, "Future Shock", charted at 71.

Hello People performed as Todd Rundgren's back-up band and background vocalists, and did solo spots on some of his early tours in the 1970s. They also were part of his Back to the Bars 1978 tours, singing background vocals and doing mime routines.

== Lineup ==
The original Hello People were:

- W. S. "Sonny" Tongue - vocal, guitar (stage name "Country")
- Greg Geddes - bass, vocal (stage name "Smoothie")
- Bobby Sedita - guitar, vocal (stage name "Goodfellow")
- Larry Tasse - keyboards, vocal (stage name "Much More")
- Michael Sagarese - flute (stage name "Wry One")
- Ronnie Blake - drums (stage name "Thump Thump")

== Discography ==
=== Studio albums ===
- The Hello People (1968) (Philips PHM 200-265 mono - PHS 600-265 stereo)
- Fusion (1968) (Philips 80027 - PHS 600-276 Stereo)
- Have You Seen The Light (1971) (MediaArts 41–8)
- Home Made With TEAC (1974) (TEAC TCA 1) An instruction LP on how to record on a 4-Track TEAC/Tascam 3340S/2340S
- The Handsome Devils (1974) (ABC Dunhill DSD-50184) One song "Creego" from "Homemade With TEAC" was rerecorded and produced by Todd Rundgren
- Bricks (1975) (ABC Dunhill 882)
- Lost At Sea (1979) (ADC Records)
