= Nick Jameson =

American actor, musician, & producer (born 1948)

- Born: December 5, 1950 (age 75); Columbia, Missouri, U.S.
- Occupations: Actor; musician; producer
- Years active: 1970–present
- Parent: Michael H. Jameson (father)

Nick Jameson (born December 5, 1950) is an American actor, comedian, musician, and producer, known for his portrayal of Russian president Yuri Suvarov over three seasons on the show 24. He currently resides in Reykjavík, doing live comedy, live music entertainment and remote voice-over work.

== Early life ==
Jameson was born to Michael H. Jameson, a classicist, and Virginia Broyles, a teacher and scholar, and was raised primarily in Philadelphia. Prior to settling in Philadelphia, however, Jameson moved with his family to various places around Europe, which exposed him to a variety of the accents that inspired his approach to many of the characters that he plays or voices.

== Career ==
He has appeared in the television series Mission Hill, The Critic, 24, Lost, The King of Queens and, vocally, in Star Wars: Clone Wars as Palpatine, Darts D'Nar in Star Wars: The Clone Wars, the radio adaptation of Dark Empire, and several other productions of Star Wars. He has over 114 film credits. He has also voiced in Spider-Man: The Animated Series as Richard Fisk and Morbius, and provided the voice of Max and Agent/Coach Morceau Oleander in the video games Sam & Max Hit the Road and Psychonauts respectively. He also voiced Lloyd in Arc the Lad: Twilight of the Spirits. In 2006, his voice was featured in the video game Metal Gear Solid: Portable Ops as Colonel Skowronski. He voiced Jim Dear in Lady and the Tramp II: Scamp's Adventure. He also voiced as Aldar Beedo in the video game Star Wars: Episode I Racer. In 2012, he voiced the character Toxic Reapa from the miniseries Hero Factory. He voices Marshall Dune in the point-and-click adventure Broken Age.

Nick has also had a relatively lengthy career in music. Early on, he was a member of The American Dream (1970), a Philadelphia band whose debut album was Todd Rundgren's first production credit. More prominent success soon followed when he briefly became the unofficial fourth member of the British blues-rock band Foghat, producing several of their albums as well, including Fool for the City, which spawned the band's biggest hit "Slow Ride." Nick's bass-playing is prominently featured on this track as well as the rest of the album. One of the tracks on Fool for the City, a cover of the Muddy Waters song "My Babe", was a song that Nick had originally recorded with The American Dream in 1970. He has also released a couple of solo albums: Already Free and A Crowd of One , the latter of which featured the single "Weatherman," which cracked the Billboard Hot 100. The track has a breezy pop-rock feel that was fairly typical of the mid-'80s. It is somewhat similar in terms of both melody and tempo to Mr. Mister's big hit, "Kyrie," albeit with much lighter percussion. A year later, Jack Wagner recorded a cover version of the tune (under the title "Weatherman Says"). Another track from the A Crowd of One album, "Love's Closing In" was also featured on the soundtrack to the 1986 film, A Fine Mess.

Jameson also performed with The Flying Fannoli Brothers, a Los Angeles musical-improvisation group with Fuzzbee Morse and Gary Anthony Williams. The group appeared at the fourth Big Stinkin' International Improv & Sketch Comedy Festival in Austin in 1999.

Although an American native, Jameson has become well known for his ability to perform in a variety of authentic accents, particularly British English and Australian.

In 2014, after living in Los Angeles for years, Jameson moved to Reykjavík.

== Filmography ==
=== Animation film ===
Year	Title	Role	Notes
1993	The Princess and the Cobbler	Brigand Singers	
1994	Scooby-Doo! in Arabian Nights	Kitchen Worker, Dress Worker	Television film
1997	Dino: The Great Egg-Scape	Scientist, Guard Bird, Dinosaur	Short film
2000	Sinbad: Beyond the Veil of Mists	Mook	
2000	The Life & Adventures of Santa Claus	Peter Knook / Andrew	
2001	Lady and the Tramp II: Scamp's Adventure	Jim Dear	Direct-to-video
2004	Clifford's Really Big Movie	Sheriff Lewis	
2006	Queer Duck: The Movie	Additional voices	Direct-to-video
2007	Beowulf	Drunken Thane	
2008	Dragon Hunters	Lord Arnold	English version
2011	Batman: Year One	Officer Stanley "Stan" Merkel	
2013	Frozen	Additional voices	

=== Animation Television ===
Year	Title	Role	Notes
1992	Capitol Critters	Additional voices	
1992	The Addams Family	Additional voices	
1993	Droopy, Master Detective	Additional voices	
1993	A Flintstone Family Christmas	Additional voices	Television Special
1994	Aaahh!!! Real Monsters	Salesman, Announcer	Episode: "Monsters Don't Dance"
1994–2001	The Critic	Vlada Veramirovich, Various	Unknown Episodes
1995–1996	The Hot Rod Dogs and Cool Car Cats	Additional voices	Unknown Episodes
1995–1997	Spider-Man: The Animated Series	Michael Morbius, Richard Fisk	17 episodes
1996–1998	The Fantastic Voyages of Sinbad the Sailor	Additional voices	Unknown Episodes
1996	The Real Adventures of Jonny Quest	Himalayan, Leif, Sultan Vikram	3 episodes
1997	What a Cartoon!	Old Man, Chauffeur, Cook	Episode: "Awfully Lucky"
1997	The Angry Beavers	Host on TV, Cool Muskrat	2 episodes
1998	Cow and Chicken	Scientists	Episode: "Playin' Hookie"
1999	The Secret Files of the Spy Dogs		
1999	The Wild Thornberrys	Hunters	Episode: "Show Me the Bunny"
1999	Godzilla: The Series	Dr. Jonathan Insley	Episode: "Future Shock"
1999	King of the Hill	Director	Episode: "Jon Vitti Presents: Return to La Grunta"
1999–2002	Mission Hill	Gus Duncz, Ron, Stogie	
2000-2003	Clifford the Big Red Dog	Sheriff Lewis	
2001	A Kitty Bobo Show	Monkey Carl	Pilot
2002–2004	What's New, Scooby-Doo?	Various	3 episodes
2003	Totally Spies!	Dr. V	Episode: "The Yuck Factor"
2003–2007	My Life as a Teenage Robot	Various	8 episodes
2003–2005	Star Wars: Clone Wars	Chancellor Palpatine / Darth Sidious	6 episodes
2005–2008	Avatar: The Last Airbender	Colonel Shinu / additional voices	2 episodes
2011	Star Wars: The Clone Wars	Darts D'Nar	Episode: "Kidnapped"
2012	Hero Factory	Toxic Reapa	Episode: "Breakout"
2014	Phineas and Ferb: Star Wars	Uncle Owen	
2014	How Murray Saved Christmas	Various	Television special

=== Live-action film ===
Year	Title	Role	Notes
1993	Look Who's Talking Now	Additional Dog / Wolf Voices	
1998	Rusty: A Dog's Tale	Ratchet the Raccoon	Voice
1999	King Cobra	Jurgen Werner	
2009	Immortally Yours	Dr. George Henderson	Direct-to-video
2011	Jerusalem Countdown	Matthew Dean	
2022	Against the Ice	Holm	

=== Live-action television ===
Year	Title	Role	Notes
1994–1995	The Bold and the Beautiful	Luc Kooning	3 episodes
1995	Seinfeld	Horst	Episode: "The Doorman"
2001	Days of Our Lives	Tristan	3 Episodes
2004–2006	Lost	Richard Malkin	2 Episodes
2006	Criminal Minds	Edward Hill	Episode: "Poison"
2006–2010	24	Russian President Yuri Suvarov	15 episodes
2008	Ghost Whisperer	Sean	Episode: "Pater Familias"

=== Video games ===
Year	Title	Role	Source
1992	Indiana Jones and the Fate of Atlantis	Dr. Hans Ubermann	
1993	Star Wars: X-Wing	Grand Moff Tarkin	
1993	Sam & Max Hit the Road	Max / Conroy Bumpus	
1993	Day of the Tentacle	Doctor Fred Edison / Doctor Red Edison / Zed Edison / Dwayne / John Hancock / Man in Ski Mask	
1994	Star Wars: TIE Fighter	Emperor Palpatine, Harkov, Imperial Officer	
1995	Star Wars: Dark Forces	Kyle Katarn	
1995	Full Throttle	Darrel, Mavis	
1996	Orion Burger	Elmo Perkins	
1997	G-NOME	Maj. Jack Sheridan	
1998	A Bug's Life	Francis	
1999	Star Wars: Episode I Racer	Aldar Beedo	
2000	Escape from Monkey Island	Hellbeard	
2001	Star Wars: Galactic Battlegrounds	Emperor Palpatine	
2002	Star Wars Racer Revenge	Aldar Beedo, Knire Dark	
2002	Blood Omen 2	Sebastian	
2002	Star Wars: Bounty Hunter	Chancellor Palpatine / Darth Sidious, Bando Gora Captain	
2003	Arc the Lad: Twilight of the Spirits	Lloyd	
2003	True Crime: Streets of LA	Additional voices	
2004	Star Wars: Battlefront	Alliance Officer, Palpatine / Darth Sidious	
2004	EverQuest II	Various characters	
2005	Shadow of Rome	Additional voices	
2005	Robots	Bigweld	
2005	Star Wars: Episode III – Revenge of the Sith	Chancellor Palpatine / Darth Sidious, Ben Kenobi, Neimodian Aide, Neimodian Sniper	
2005	Psychonauts	Agent / Coach Morceau Oleander, Doctor Loboto, Mr. Pokeylope	
2005	Star Wars: Battlefront II	Alliance Officer No. 2, Palpatine / Darth Sidious	
2006	Final Fantasy XII	Raminas B'nargin Dalmasca	
2006	Metal Gear Solid: Portable Ops	Colonel Skowronski	
2006	Justice League Heroes	Solovar	
2007	The Golden Compass	Ness, Servants	
2009	Assassin's Creed II	Additional voices	
2010	Resonance of Fate	Additional voices	
2010	Spider-Man: Shattered Dimensions	Additional voices	
2010	Star Wars: The Force Unleashed II	Bookie, Rebel Officer	
2010	Assassin's Creed: Brotherhood	Additional voices	
2011	Resistance 3	Prisoners	
2011	Star Wars: The Old Republic	Additional voices	
2012	Darksiders II	Ostegoth, Skeleton Champion	
2013	Marvel Heroes	Doctor Strange, MODOK	
2013	Ratchet & Clank: Into the Nexus	Armor Grummel	
2014	Lightning Returns: Final Fantasy XIII	Additional voices	
2015	Broken Age	Marshall Dune	
2017	Psychonauts in the Rhombus of Ruin	Agent / Coach Morceau Oleander, Doctor Loboto	
2021	Psychonauts 2	Agent / Coach Morceau Oleander, Doctor Loboto	

== Discography ==
=== Studio albums ===
- Already Free (1977) (Paul Butterfield, harmonica.)
- A Crowd of One (1986)

=== with The American Dream ===
- The American Dream (1970)

=== with Paul Butterfield ===
- Paul Butterfield's Better Days – It All Comes Back (1973) (producer only)
- Put it in Your Ear (1976)

=== with Tim Moore ===
- Tim Moore (1974)
- Behind the Eyes (1975) (producer only)

=== with Foghat ===
- Rock and Roll Outlaws (1974) (producer only)
- Fool for the City (1975)
- Girls to Chat and Boys to Bounce (1981) (producer only)
- In the Mood for Something Rude (1982)
- Zig-Zag Walk (1983)
- Return of the Boogie Men (1994) (producer only)
