= Ra (Utopia album) =

Studio album by Utopia
- Released: February 4, 1977
- Studios: Bearsville Studios (Woodstock); Utopia Sound Studios (Lake Hill); Turtle Creek Barn (Woodstock)
- Genres: Progressive rock; art rock
- Length: 53:04
- Label: Bearsville
- Producer: Todd Rundgren

Utopia chronology
Another Live (1975)	Ra (1977)	Oops! Wrong Planet (1977)

Singles from Ra
- 1. "Communion with the Sun" Released: February 1977

Professional ratings
Review scores
Source	Rating
AllMusic	2.5/5 stars
Christgau's Record Guide	D+
The Rolling Stone Album Guide	2.5/5 stars

Ra is the second studio album by American rock band Utopia, released on February 4, 1977, by Bearsville Records. Band leader Todd Rundgren planned on releasing the LP in 1976 on his own label, Ethereal Records, as the new four-piece line up was not signed to Bearsville. Replete with an elaborate $250,000 stage show featuring a 22-foot-tall (6.7 m) pyramid and golden sphinx which took 18 months of prep, Ra was Rundgren's most ambitious live undertaking.

The cornerstone of the album and show is "Singring and the Glass Guitar," which comprises solos by each band member battling the elements: water (drums), wind (bass), fire (keyboards), and earth (guitar).

The album was modestly successful, peaking the Billboard Top 200 at No. 79.

== Track listing ==
A number of test pressings (and a very limited amount of vinyl and 8 track tape pressings) were made using a rejected master that includes alternate mixes of some of the tracks on the album. The songs "Communion with the Sun" and "Sunburst Finish" are almost entirely different takes- "Communion with the Sun" has a more aggressive drum track, alternate vocals and instrumental solos; "Sunburst Finish" has lead vocals that are similar but different backing vocals (with some present in the commonly released mix missing completely). "Singring and the Glass Guitar" is missing the intro to Willie Wilcox's drum solo. All the other tracks on this pressing are indistinguishable from the commonly released master.

With the exception of the European pressing, the only way to tell if a particular copy of an LP (or tape) was pressed from the rejected master is by playing it. In Europe, A1 or B1 will be written into the dead wax of the vinyl of these initial pressings. It is unknown exactly how many pressings from the rejected master were manufactured.

Side one
No.	Title	Writer(s)	Lead vocals	Length
1.	"Overture: Mountaintop and Sunrise" "Communion with the Sun"	Bernard Herrmann Rundgren	None Rundgren	7:15
2.	"Magic Dragon Theatre"	Rundgren; Sulton	Sulton; Rundgren	3:28
3.	"Jealousy"	Rundgren; Wilcox	Wilcox	4:43
4.	"Eternal Love"	Powell; Sulton	Sulton	4:51
5.	"Sunburst Finish"	Powell; Rundgren	Powell; Rundgren; Sulton	7:38

Side two
No.	Title	Writer(s)	Lead vocals	Length
6.	"Hiroshima"	Powell; Rundgren	Rundgren; Sulton	7:16
7.	"Singring and the Glass Guitar (An Electrified Fairytale)"	Powell; Rundgren; Sulton; Wilcox	Rundgren; Wilcox; Sulton; Powell	18:24
Total length:				53:35

== Personnel ==
=== Utopia ===
- Todd Rundgren – guitar, vocals, piano (2), saxophone (2)
- Roger Powell – keyboards, synthesizers, vocals
- Kasim Sulton – bass, vocals
- John "Willie" Wilcox – drums, percussion, vocals, harmony guitar (3)

=== Technical ===
- Produced by Todd Rundgren
- Engineered by John Holbrook
- Assistant engineer – Tom Mark
- Additional engineer – Eddy Offord (1, 3)
- Album package concept – Utopia & Gribbitt, Ltd.
- Cover photography – Ron Sleneak
- Pyramid insert – Norman Seeff
- Calligrapher – Hal Fiedler
- Musical arrangements by Utopia
- "The Olde Faerie Storyteller" – John Holbrook (7)

== Charts ==
Album - Billboard

Year	Chart	Position
1977	Pop Albums	79
