= Oops! Wrong Planet =

Studio album by Utopia
- Released: September 1977
- Recorded: 1977
- Studio: Utopia Sound Studios (Lake Hill)
- Genres: Art rock; pop rock; progressive rock
- Length: 45:22
- Label: Bearsville
- Producer: Todd Rundgren

Utopia chronology
Ra (1977)	Oops! Wrong Planet (1977)	Adventures in Utopia (1979)

Singles from Oops! Wrong Planet
- 1. "Love Is the Answer" Released: October 14, 1977

Professional ratings
Review scores
Source	Rating
AllMusic	3.5/5 stars
The Rolling Stone Album Guide	3/5 stars

Oops! Wrong Planet is the third studio album by American rock band Utopia, released in September 1977 by Bearsville Records. It delivers a markedly trimmed-down, pop-oriented direction for the band following the progressively influenced previous album, Ra.

The album peaked at No. 77 on the Billboard album chart in 1977.

"Love Is the Answer" later became a hit for England Dan & John Ford Coley, charting No. 1 on the Billboard Adult Contemporary list in 1979.

== Track listing ==
Side one
No.	Title	Writer(s)	Lead vocals	Length
1.	"Trapped"	Todd Rundgren	Sulton; Rundgren	3:06
2.	"Windows"	Roger Powell	Powell	4:17
3.	"Love in Action"	Rundgren	Rundgren	3:26
4.	"Crazy Lady Blue"	Rundgren; John Wilcox	Wilcox	3:37
5.	"Back on the Street"	Rundgren	Sulton	4:09
6.	"The Marriage of Heaven and Hell"	Powell; Rundgren; Kasim Sulton	Rundgren; Sulton	4:33

Side two
No.	Title	Writer(s)	Lead vocals	Length
7.	"The Martyr"	Rundgren; Sulton	Sulton	3:48
8.	"Abandon City"	Powell; Rundgren	Powell	3:49
9.	"Gangrene"	Rundgren; Wilcox	Wilcox	3:36
10.	"My Angel"	Powell; Rundgren	Sulton; Rundgren	3:40
11.	"Rape of the Young"	Rundgren	Rundgren	3:11
12.	"Love Is the Answer"	Rundgren	Rundgren	4:10
Total length:				45:22

== Personnel ==
=== Utopia ===
- Todd Rundgren – vocals, guitar, saxophone (10)
- Roger Powell – vocals, keyboards, trumpet (8), Powell probe
- Kasim Sulton – vocals, bass guitar
- John "Willie" Wilcox – vocals, drums

=== Technical ===
- Produced and engineered by Todd Rundgren
- Additional engineer – Mike Young
- Graphic concept – Utopia
- Graphic execution – Ken Kneitel
- Photography – Fred Weiss
- Publicity – Ken Schaffer

== Charts ==
Chart (1977)	Peak position
US Top LPs & Tape (Billboard)	73
