= The American Dream (band) =

Philadelphia-based band

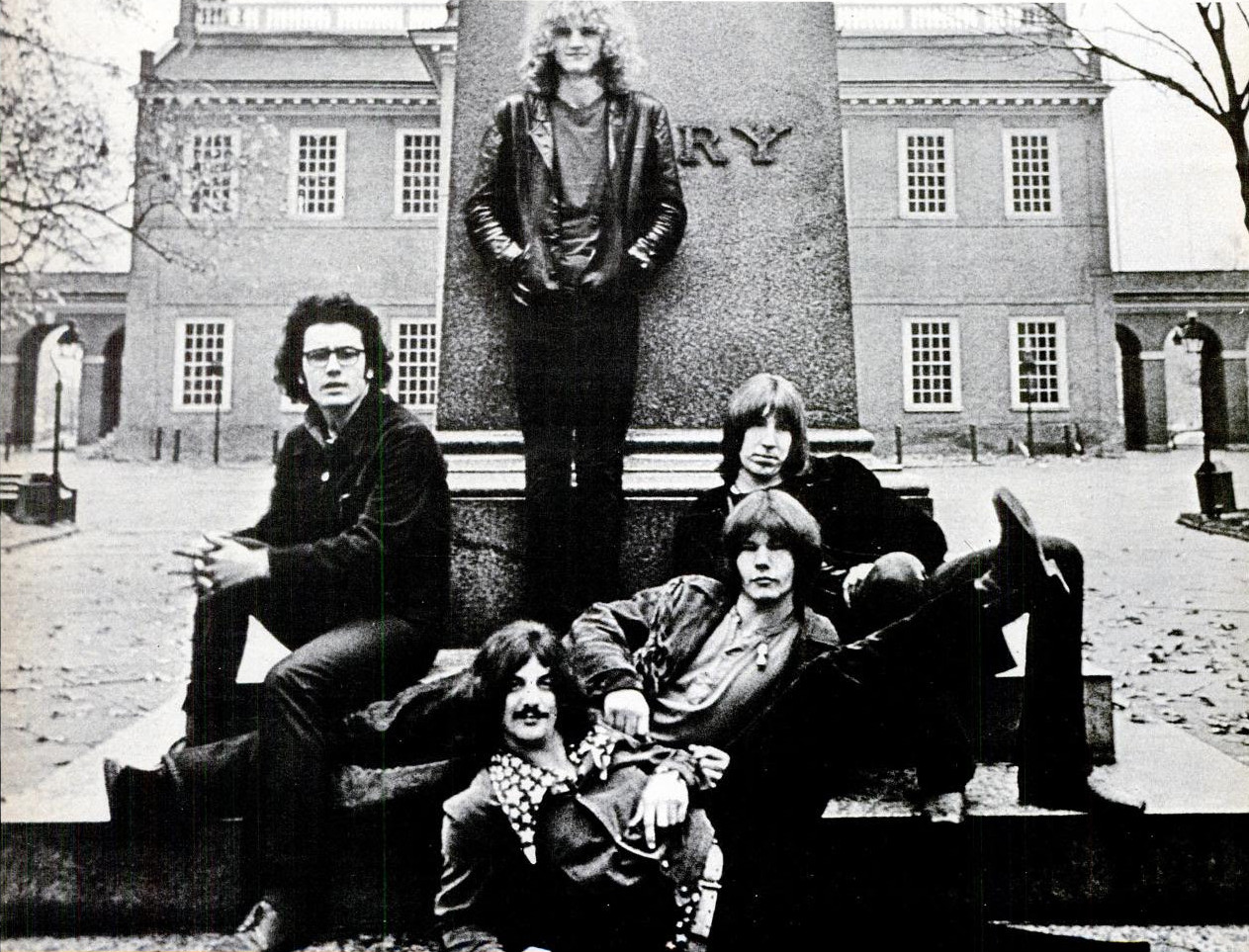
The American Dream c. 1970

The American Dream (Don Lee Van Winkle, Nicky Indelicato, Nick Jameson (later of Foghat), Don Ferris, Mickey Brook) were a Philadelphia-based band.

== Releases ==
Their eponymously titled 1970 album was the first album produced by Todd Rundgren. It peaked at No. 194 on the Billboard Top LPs chart. It is their only album. They released one single: "I Ain't Searchin'" backed with "Good News" in the same year as the album.
