= List of people from Englewood, New Jersey =

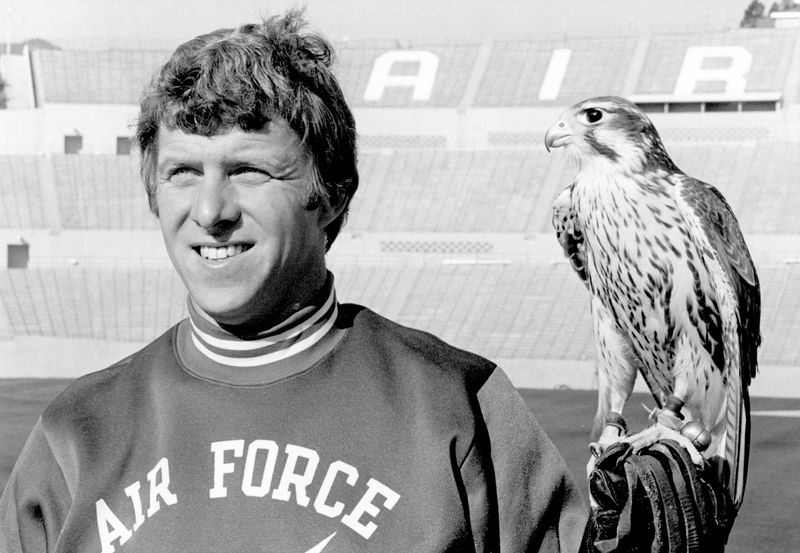
Bill Parcells

The people that are listed below were born in, residents of, or otherwise closely associated with Englewood, New Jersey, United States.

== Academics, medicine and science ==
- Lori Altshuler (1957–2015), professor at the University of California, Los Angeles Department of Psychiatry and Biobehavioral Sciences
- Gordon Park Baker (1938–2002), philosopher
- Ed Barnhart (born 1968), archaeologist and explorer specializing in ancient civilizations of the Americas
- Carolyn Denning (1927–2016), pediatrician and pioneer in cystic fibrosis treatment
- Foster Rhea Dulles (1900–1970), journalist, history professor and author
- Josephine English (1920–2011), gynecologist who was one of the first black women to open a private practice in New York state
- Gene-Ann Polk Horne (1926–2015), physician and hospital administrator, director of pediatric ambulatory care at Harlem Hospital and professor of pediatrics at Columbia University
- Robert Stell Lemmon (1885–1964), naturalist and author
- Malcolm McKenna (1930–2008), paleontologist, whose wife, Priscilla, served as mayor of Englewood
- Robert Mills (1927–1999), physicist
- Eli Sagan (1927–2015), clothing manufacturer; lecturer and author in cultural anthropology; political activist; served on the national finance committee for George McGovern's 1972 presidential campaign, a role that earned him a spot on Richard Nixon's Enemies List in 1973
- Margaret Bailey Speer (1900–1997), educator and teaching missionary
- Dorothy Warburton (1936–2016), geneticist

== Arts ==
=== Authors ===
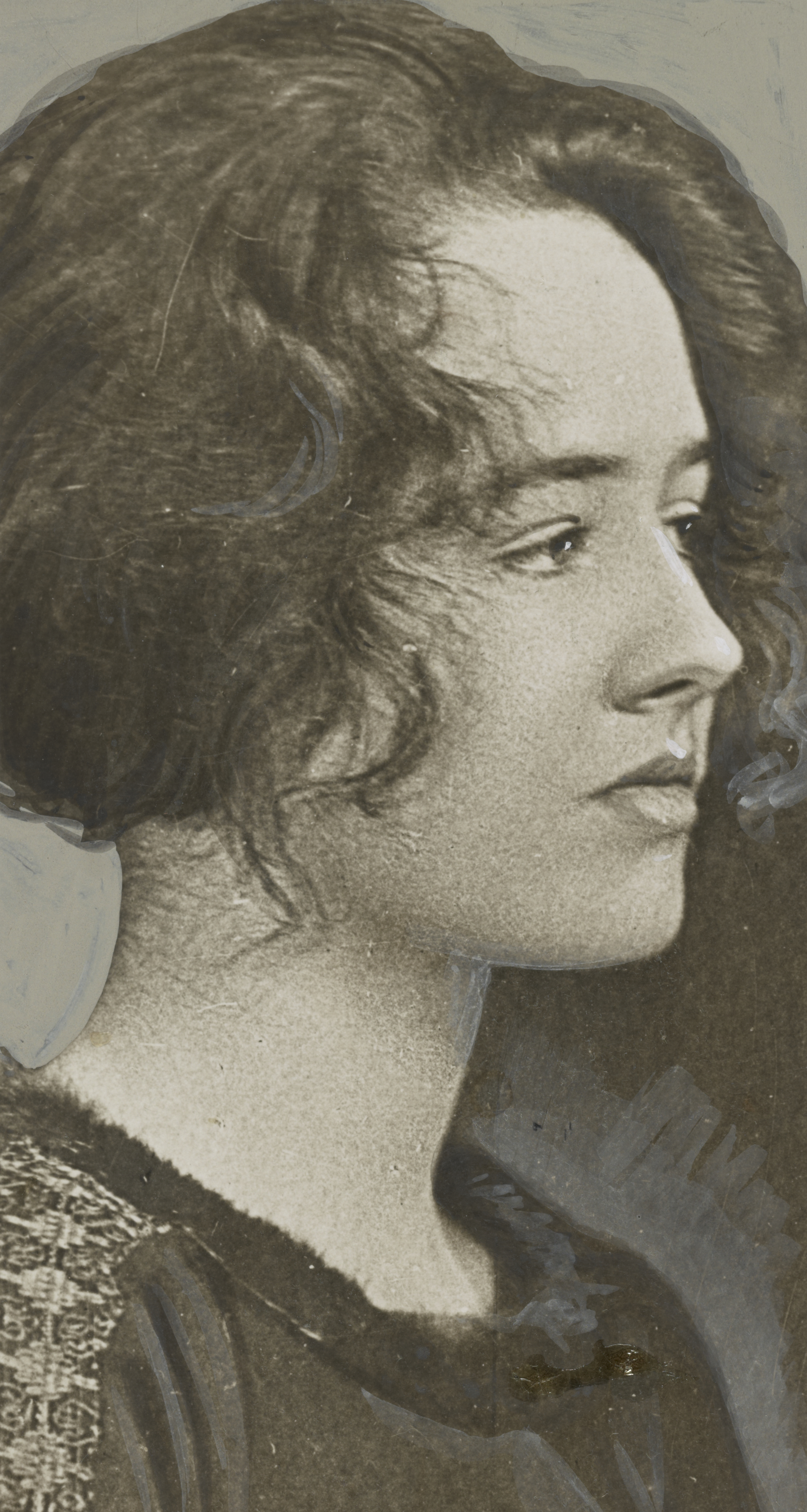
Anne Morrow Lindbergh

- Miriam Anzovin, writer, artist and social media personality
- Charles W. Bailey (1929–2012), journalist, newspaper editor and novelist who co-wrote the 1962 best-selling political thriller novel Seven Days in May
- Kevin Baker (born 1958), novelist and journalist
- Alex Berenson (born 1973), novelist and former reporter for The New York Times
- Otto Binder (1911–1974), author of science fiction / non-fiction books and comic books, best known as the co-creator of Supergirl
- Claudia Cohen (1950–2007), socialite and gossip columnist
- Brian Daley (1947–1996), science fiction novelist
- William Deresiewicz (born 1964), author, essayist and literary critic
- Anna Dewdney (1965–2016), author and illustrator of children's books, including Llama Llama Red Pajama
- Robert Levithan (1951–2016, class of 1969), writer and HIV/AIDS activist
- Anne Morrow Lindbergh (1906–2001), author and aviator; wife of Charles Lindbergh and daughter of Dwight Morrow
- James Lord (1922–2009), biographer
- Sue Macy (born 1954), author, whose 2019 book, The Book Rescuer, won the Sydney Taylor Book Award from the Association of Jewish Libraries
- William Marchant (1923–1995), playwright and screenwriter, best known for writing the play that served as the basis for the 1957 Walter Lang movie The Desk Set
- Ian O'Connor (born 1964), sports columnist; ESPN radio host; wrote books Arnie & Jack: Palmer, Nicklaus & Golf's Greatest Rivalry and The Captain: The Journey of Derek Jeter
- Phil Pepe (1935–2015), baseball writer and radio voice who spent more than five decades covering sports in New York City
- Upton Sinclair (1878–1968), author; established a commune called Helicon Home Colony in 1906 with proceeds from his novel The Jungle; it burned down in 1907
- David Stout (1942–2020), journalist, who was best known for his work with The New York Times, and author of mystery novels and of non-fiction about violent crime

=== Fine arts ===
- Serena Bocchino (born 1960), artist working primarily in the realm of abstract painting
- Faith Ringgold (1930–2024), artist, best known for her narrative quilts
- Frederick Roth (1872–1944), sculptor and animalier, well known for his statues of animals, including the statue of the sled dog Balto in New York City's Central Park
- Robert Whitman (1935–2024), visual and performance artist best known for his pieces of the early 1960s combining visual and sound images, actors, film, slides, and evocative props

=== Movies, radio, stage and television ===
- Glenn Anders (1889–1981), actor best known for his work in Broadway theatre
- John Aprea (1941–2024), actor, known for his role as "Young Sal Tessio" in The Godfather Part II (1974) and on television as "Lucas Castigliano" on the soap opera Another World
- Julia Barr (born 1949), actress best known for her role on the soap opera All My Children, playing the character of Brooke English
- Shakira Barrera (born 1990), dancer and actor who has appeared in the Netflix series GLOW
- Martin Block (1903–1967), disk jockey who is said to have inspired the creation of the term by Walter Winchell
- Elizabeth Bracco (born 1959), actress
- David Cassidy (1950–2017), actor and musician, best known for his role on The Partridge Family
- David X. Cohen (born 1966), head writer and executive producer of TV series Futurama
- Peter Coyote (born 1941), actor and author, known for films such as E.T. and Jagged Edge
- Vince Curatola (born 1953), played Johnny Sack on the HBO series The Sopranos
- Pamela Duncan (1924–2005), actress who lived in Englewood her last ten years
- John Fiedler (1925–2005), voice actor and character actor in stage, film, television and radio, known as the voice of Piglet in Disney's many Winnie the Pooh productions, and as Mr. Peterson, nervous patient on The Bob Newhart Show
- Lucy Fisher (born 1949), film producer
- Genie Francis (born 1962), best known for her role as Laura Spencer on General Hospital
- Ivor Francis (1918–1986), actor
- Frankie Grande (born 1983), dancer, actor, singer, producer, television host and YouTube personality
- Zach Grenier (born 1954), actor known for roles in Fight Club and Deadwood, and on Broadway
- Jess Harnell (born 1963), voice actor and singer, best known for voicing Wakko Warner in Animaniacs
- Seth Herzog (born 1970), comedian
- Jon-Erik Hexum (1957–1984), actor
- Justine Johnstone (1895–1982), stage and silent screen actress; later a pathologist and was part of the team that developed the modern intravenous drip technique
- Sara Lee Kessler (born 1951), television news reporter
- Alicia Keys (born 1981), singer, songwriter, record producer and actress
- Téa Leoni (born 1966), actress
- Richard Lewis (1947–2024), comedian and actor, known for his roles on Anything but Love and Curb Your Enthusiasm
- Bruce McKenna (born 1962), television and movie screenwriter
- Eddie Murphy (born 1961), comedian and actor
- Miles Orman (born 1984), cast member on Sesame Street
- Roscoe Orman (born 1944), television personality Gordon on Sesame Street
- Charles Osgood (1933–2024), television personality
- Rick Overton (born 1954), screenwriter, actor, and comedian
- Betsy Palmer (1926–2015), actress
- Sarah Jessica Parker (born 1965), actress, best known for her starring role in HBO's Sex and the City
- Clarke Peters (born 1952), actor; played Det. Lester Freamon on HBO's The Wire
- Aidan Quinn (born 1959), actor
- Savnt (born 1991 as Stephan Marcellus), vocalist and songwriter who competed on the 13th season of NBC's television series The Voice
- Rick Schwartz (born c. 1968), film producer
- Al Sharpton (born 1954), civil rights activist and radio talk show host
- Dick Shawn (1923–1987), actor and comedian
- Brooke Shields (born 1965), actress
- Gloria Swanson (1899–1983), actress, best known for the film Sunset Boulevard
- Ellen Travolta (born 1939), actress known for her roles in the film Grease and the 1950s-based sitcom Happy Days
- John Travolta (born 1954), actor, known for films such as Pulp Fiction, Grease and Saturday Night Fever
- Abi Varghese, director and writer, best known for his Netflix show Brown Nation
- Tom Wright (born 1952), television and theater actor
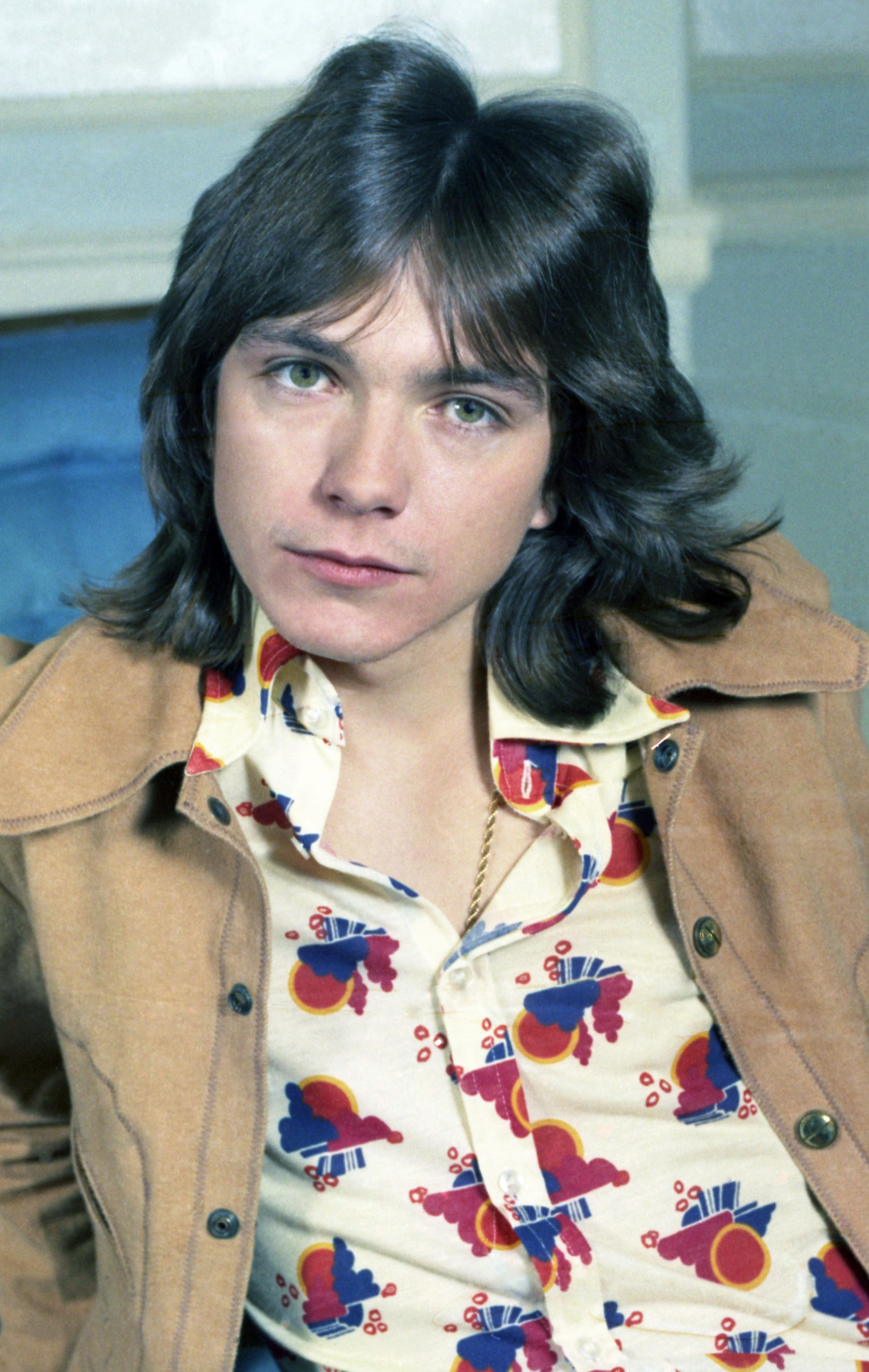
David Cassidy

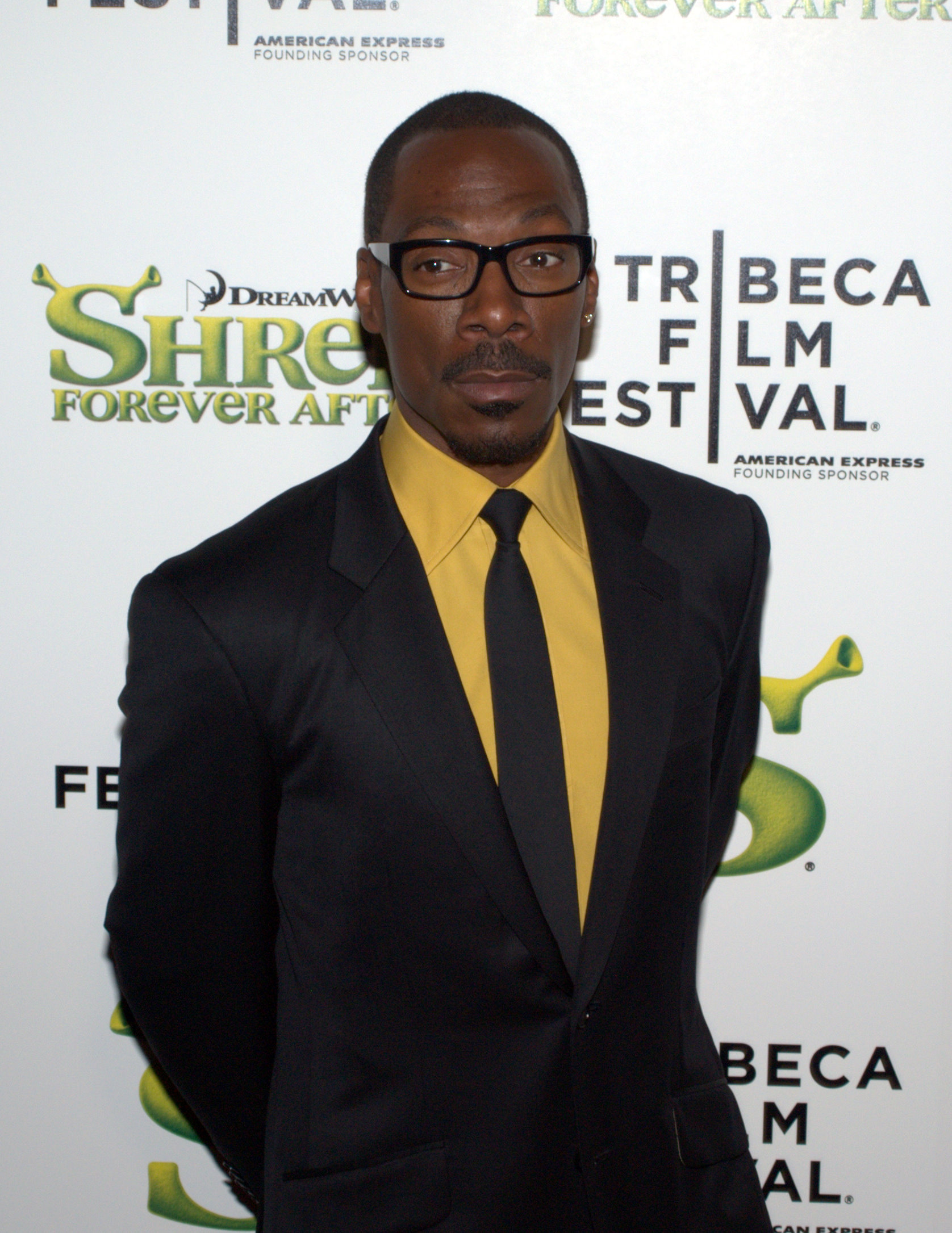
Eddie Murphy

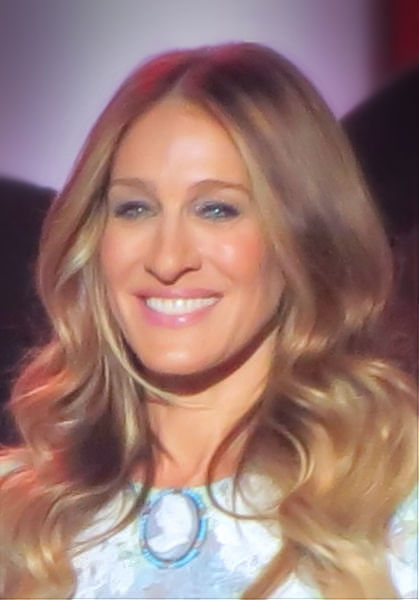
Sarah Jessica Parker

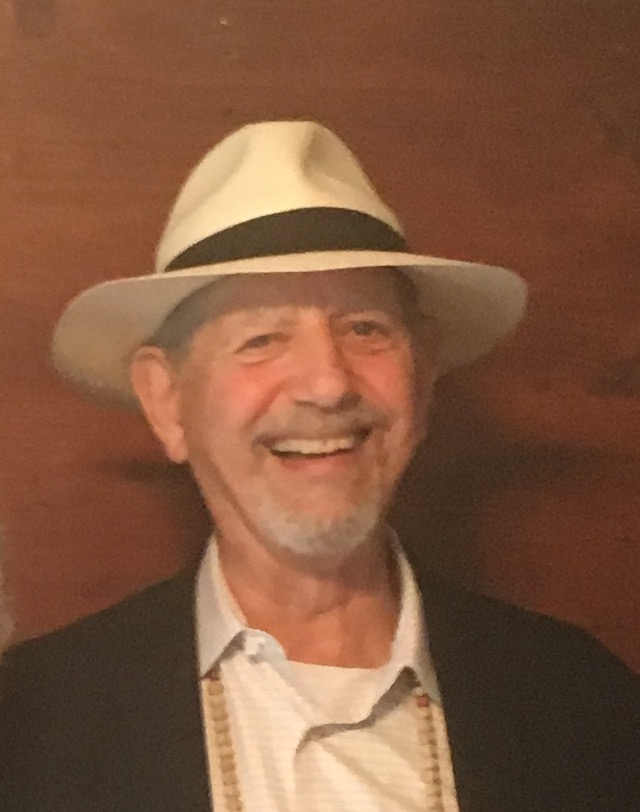
Peter Coyote

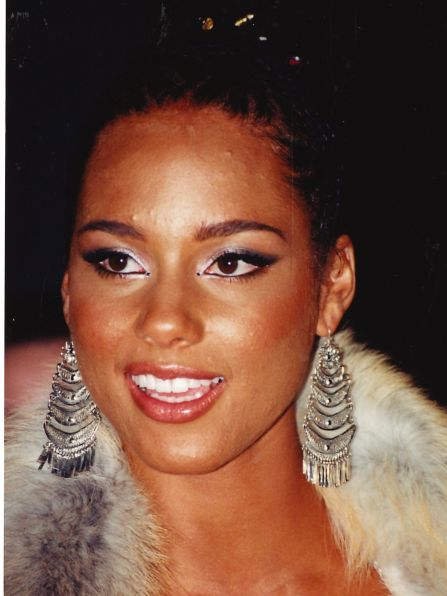
Alicia Keys

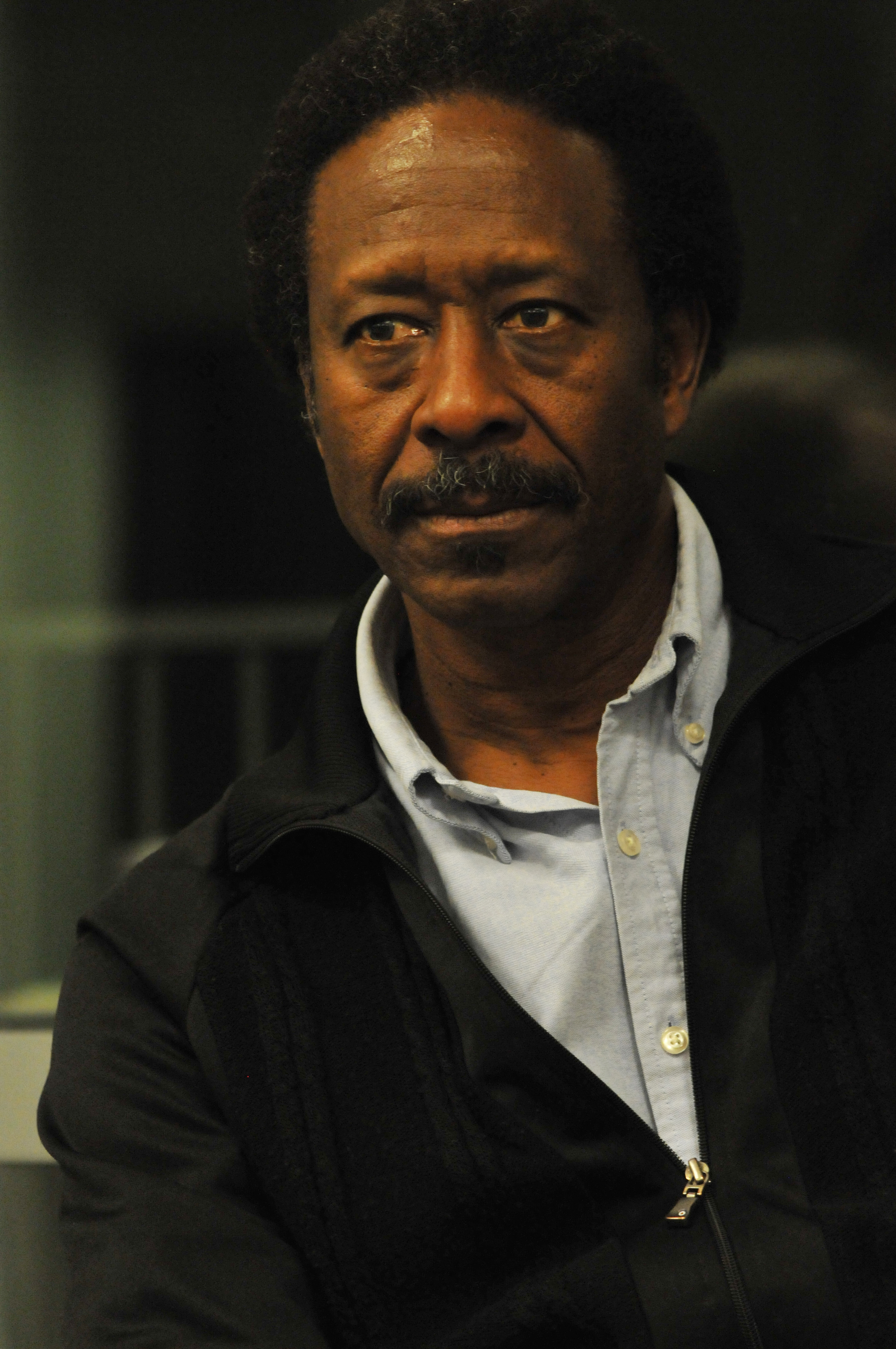
Clarke Peters

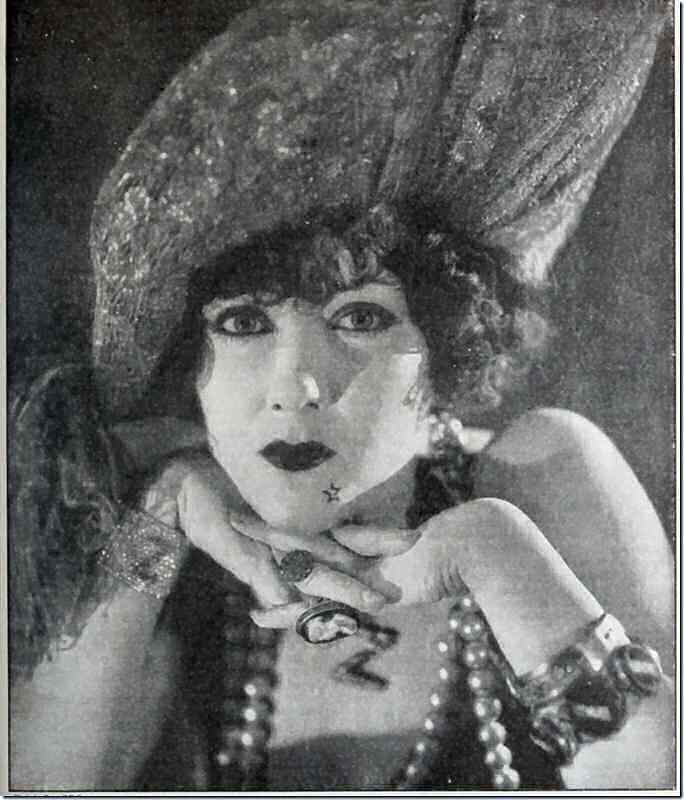
Gloria Swanson

=== Music ===
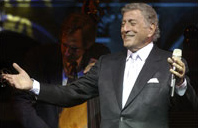
Tony Bennett

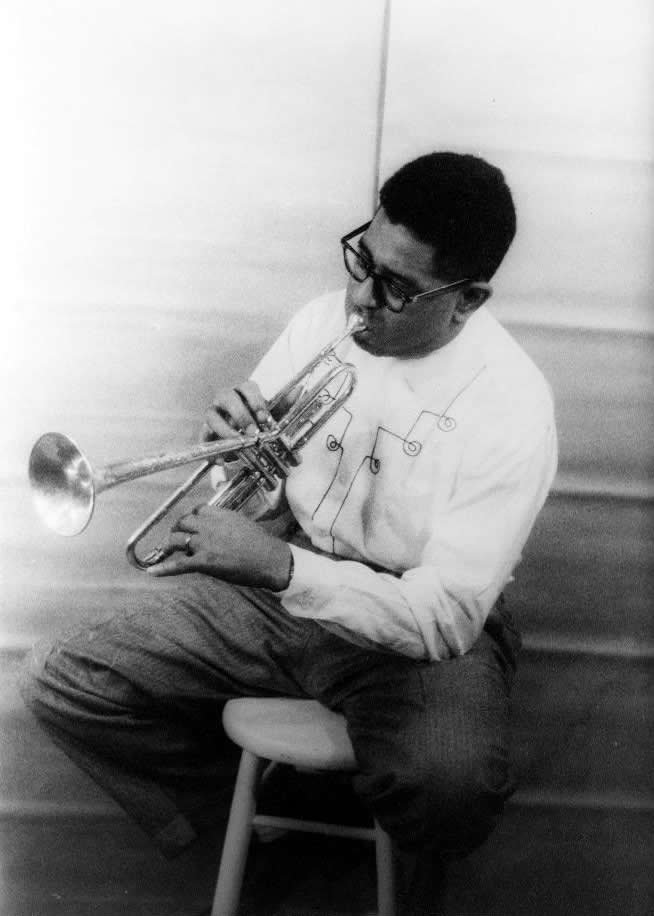
Dizzy Gillespie

- Regina Belle (born 1963), Grammy Award-winning singer
- Estelle Bennett (1941–2009), member of the girl group The Ronettes, with her sister Ronnie Spector and cousin Nedra Talley
- Tony Bennett (1926–2023), Grammy Award-winning singer
- George Benson (born 1943), jazz singer and musician
- John Bergamo (1940–2013), percussionist and composer
- William Foden (1860–1947), classical guitar composer; lived in Englewood since 1911
- Virgil Fox (1912–1980), organist
- Dizzy Gillespie (1917–1993), jazz trumpeter; lived in Englewood from 1965 until his death in 1993
- Doug Howard (born 1956), musician, vocalist and songwriter; has performed with Touch, Todd Rundgren, Utopia and The Edgar Winter Group
- Ernie Isley (born 1952), guitarist and member of The Isley Brothers
- Marvin Isley (1953–2010), bassist and member of the Isley Brothers
- Serius Jones (born 1982), MC, battle rapper, mixtape awards winner
- Kitty Kallen (1921–2016), singer
- Lil' Kim (born 1975), real name Kimberly Jones, rapper
- Bruce Lundvall (1935–2015), record company executive, best known for his period as the president and CEO of the Blue Note Label Group, reporting directly to Eric Nicoli, the Chief Executive Officer of EMI Group
- Stephan Marcellus (born 1991), musician, singer and songwriter who appeared on season 13 of The Voice
- Yumi Nu, model and singer-songwriter
- Karen O (born 1978 as Karen Lee Orzołek), lead vocalist for the New York City art punk band Yeah Yeah Yeahs
- Clyde Otis (1924–2008), music industry executive
- Margaret Patrick (1913–1994), "Ebony" of "Ebony and Ivory"
- Wilson Pickett (1941–2006), singer
- Sylvia Robinson (1936–2011), singer, record producer, and co-founder of Sugar Hill Records and All Platinum Records
- Slam Stewart (1914–1987), upright bass player who played for Charlie Parker and Art Tatum
- Bob Weinstock (1928–2006), founder of Prestige Records
- Leslie West (1945–2020), musician, singer and guitarist of Mountain
- Matt White (born 1980), singer-songwriter
- Eric Williams, singer and member of Blackstreet

== Business and industry ==
- Robert Bakish (born 1963), President and CEO of Paramount Global
- John Crowley (born 1967), biotech executive who helped develop a treatment for Pompe disease after his children were diagnosed with the condition
- Victor Farris (1910–1985), inventor and businessman; credited with inventing the paper milk carton
- B. C. Forbes (1880–1954), founder of Forbes magazine
- Malcolm Forbes (1919–1990), entrepreneur most prominently known as the publisher of Forbes magazine, founded by his father B. C. Forbes
- David Hoadley (1806–1873), businessman who served as president of the Panama Railway
- Elaine Romagnoli (1942–2021), owner of several lesbian bars in New York City
- Daniel E. Straus (born 1957), business executive who is co-founder of CareOne LLC and Vice Chairman of the Memphis Grizzlies
- Cyma Zarghami (born 1962), president of Nickelodeon and MTV Networks' Kids & Family Group

== Government and politics ==
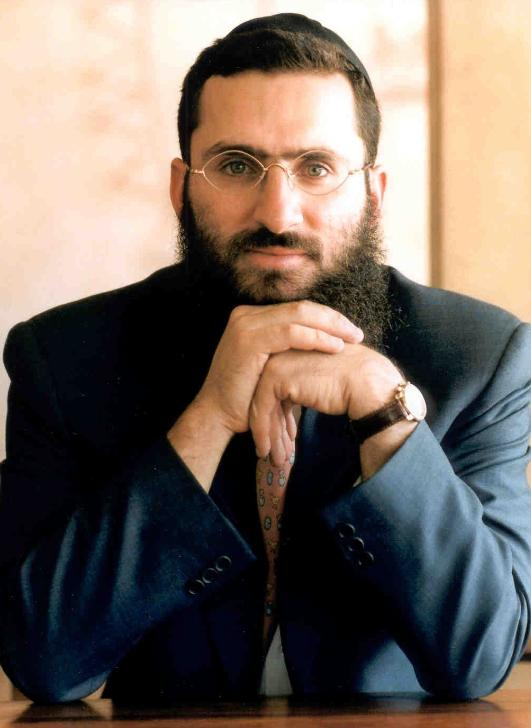
Shmuley Boteach

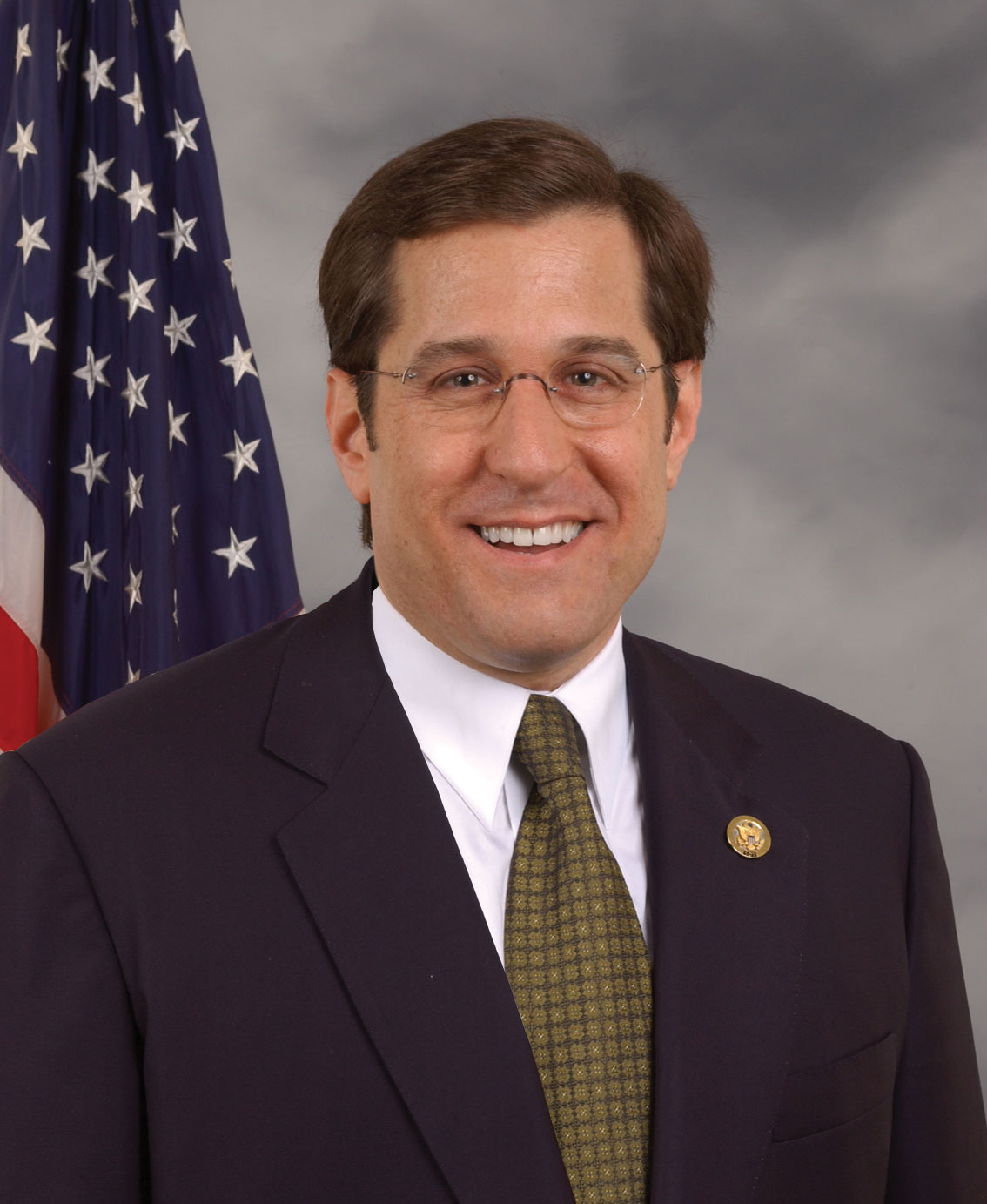
Steve Rothman

- Byron Baer (1929–2007), politician who served in the New Jersey General Assembly 1972–1993 and in the State Senate 1994–2005
- Shmuley Boteach (born 1966), Orthodox rabbi; radio and television host; author; ran for Congress in New Jersey's 5th congressional district
- Howard W. Brill (born 1943), law professor and jurist; chief justice of the Arkansas Supreme Court 2015–2016
- Wayne A. Cauthen (born 1955), current and first appointed African American City Manager of Kansas City, Missouri
- Orestes Cleveland (1829–1896), Mayor of Jersey City 1864–1867 and 1886–1892; member of the U.S. House of Representatives from New Jersey's 5th congressional district, 1869–1871
- Ron de Lugo (1930–2020), first delegate from the United States Virgin Islands to the House of Representatives
- J. Christopher Giancarlo (born 1959), attorney and former business executive who served as 13th chairman of the United States Commodity Futures Trading Commission
- S. Fitzgerald Haney (born 1969), diplomat who served as United States Ambassador to Costa Rica
- Alphonse A. Haettenschwiller (1925–2025), politician who served in the New Hampshire House of Representatives and United States Army Reserve officer
- Alexander L. Jackson (1891–1973), African American business owner and civic leader, who was co-founder of the Chicago Urban League, and general manager of The Chicago Defender
- Jon Leibowitz (born 1958), chairman of the Federal Trade Commission
- Michael Leiter, director of the National Counterterrorism Center
- Rob Menendez (born 1985), U.S. representative for New Jersey
- Dwight Morrow (1873–1931), former United States Senator; United States Ambassador to Mexico; father-in law of Charles Lindbergh; namesake of Dwight Morrow High School
- Jay Johnson Morrow (1870–1937), United States Army officer who served as Governor of the Panama Canal Zone 1921–1924
- Sybil Moses (1939–2009), prosecutor of the "Dr. X killings" case; New Jersey Superior Court judge
- Malcolm Muir (1914–2011), former district court judge for the United States District Court for the Middle District of Pennsylvania
- Dan Fellows Platt (1873–1937), art collector and expert; Mayor of Englewood (1904–1905)
- Sylvia Pressler (1934–2010), Chief Judge of the Appellate Division the New Jersey Superior Court for five years, officially retiring from the bench in 2004
- Bill Rosendahl (1945–2016), politician who served on the Los Angeles City Council
- Steve Rothman (born 1952), former congressmen who served as the mayor of Englewood 1983–1989
- Peter F. Secchia (1937–2020), businessman and diplomat who served as the United States Ambassador to Italy 1989–1993
- Sister Souljah (born 1964), rapper and activist
- Walter Scott Taylor, Sr., clergyman, civil rights advocate and first African-American mayor of Englewood
- Susan Thomases (born 1944), attorney; personal counsel and informal adviser to Hillary Clinton during the Clinton presidency
- Robert Torricelli (born 1951), former U.S. Senator; resided in Englewood throughout his career of elective political office
- Alexander Buel Trowbridge (1929–2006), former United States Secretary of Commerce
- Austin Volk (1919–2010), former mayor of Englewood during the 1967 civil unrest; former New Jersey assemblyman
- Rachel Wainer Apter (born 1980), lawyer who was nominated in March 2021 to be an associate justice of the Supreme Court of New Jersey
- Michael Wildes (born 1964), immigration lawyer; mayor of Englewood 2004–2010
- Craig Zucker (born 1975), member of the Maryland State Senate

== Sports ==
- Jack Armstrong (born 1965), former Major League Baseball right-handed pitcher
- Sean Banks (born 1985), professional basketball player
- Alejandro Bedoya (born 1987), professional soccer player for Philadelphia Union
- Gregg Berhalter (born 1973), soccer player and coach
- Ruben Brown (born 1972), guard for 13 seasons in the NFL for the Buffalo Bills and Chicago Bears
- Harriet Butler (1873–1935), tennis player who won the US Women's National Championship in 1893
- Dick Button (1929-2025), Olympic ice skater and commentator; ranked No. 11 on the Sports Illustrated list of "The 50 Greatest New Jersey Sports Figures"
- Nick Catone (born 1981), mixed martial artist who fights in the Ultimate Fighting Championship middleweight division
- Bruce Delventhal, retired ice hockey player, coach and administrator who led two ice hockey programs before becoming the athletic director for Plattsburgh State
- Garrett Dickerson (born 1995), tight end for the New York Giants
- Joe Echols (c. 1916–1977), American football coach, college athletics administrator and Negro league baseball player
- Devin Fuller (born 1994), wide receiver for the Atlanta Falcons of the National Football League
- Germain Glidden (1914–1999), national squash champion, painter, muralist, cartoonist and founder of the National Art Museum of Sport
- Bruce Harper (born 1955), former professional football player for the New York Jets
- Chris Hewitt (born 1974), former NFL defensive back who played for the New Orleans Saints
- Richie Incognito (born 1983), guard for the Buffalo Bills of the National Football League
- Janet Jacobs (1928–2017), All-American Girls Professional Baseball League player
- Jimmie Jones (born 1947), former American football defensive end in the National Football League for the New York Jets and the Washington Redskins
- Rob Kaminsky (born 1994), MLB pitcher who has played for the St. Louis Cardinals
- Oswald Kirkby (1886–1934), amateur golfer
- Ross Krautman (born 1991), placekicker for the Syracuse Orange football team
- Franky Martinez (born 1995), soccer player who plays as a defender for Lexington SC in the USL League One
- Pierre McGuire (born 1961), sportscaster and sports commentator
- Liliko Ogasawara (born 1972), judoka who represented the United States in Judo at the 1996 Summer Olympics
- Maureen Orcutt (1907–2007), pioneer golfer and reporter for The New York Times who had 65 career amateur victories; inducted into New Jersey Golf Association and New York State Halls of Fame; named Women's Metropolitan Golf Association's Player of the Century
- Bill Parcells (born 1941), NFL Head Coach, formerly of the New York Giants and New York Jets
- Ethel Bliss Platt (1881–1971), U.S. tennis doubles champion in 1906, wife of Dan Fellows Platt
- Jim Price (born 1966), former professional football tight end
- Richie Scheinblum (1942–2021), Major League Baseball All Star outfielder
- Paul Stoeken (born 1975), windsurfer who represented the United States Virgin Islands at the 1996 Summer Olympics and the 2000 Summer Olympics
- Lou Tepe (born 1930), offensive lineman for three seasons with the Pittsburgh Steelers
- Jordan Theodore (born 1989), professional basketball player who currently plays for the Frankfurt Skyliners of the German Basketball League
- Tony Tolbert (born 1967), former NFL player for the Dallas Cowboys
- Ron Villone (born 1970), pitcher for the New York Yankees and 11 other teams during his MLB career
- Bill Willoughby (born 1957), former NBA basketball player; the first NBA player drafted out of high school when he was selected by the Atlanta Hawks in 1975
- John Winkin (1919–2014), baseball coach, scout, broadcaster, journalist and collegiate athletics administrator; led the University of Maine Black Bears baseball team to six College World Series berths in an 11-year span
- Emily Wold (born 1994), former field hockey player, played as a midfielder
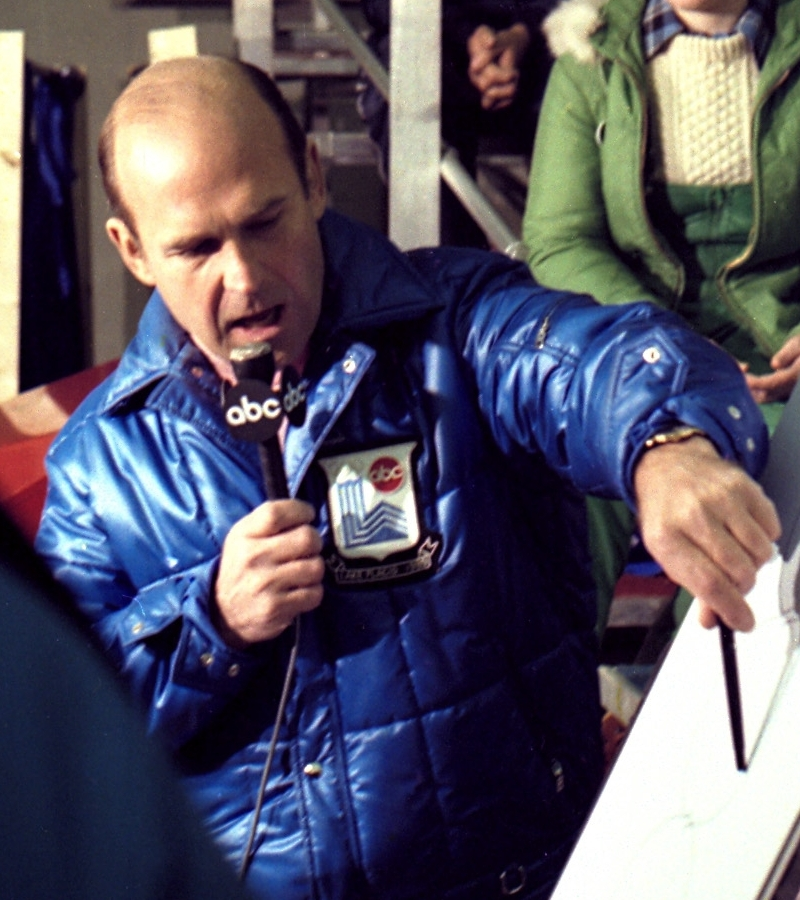
Dick Button

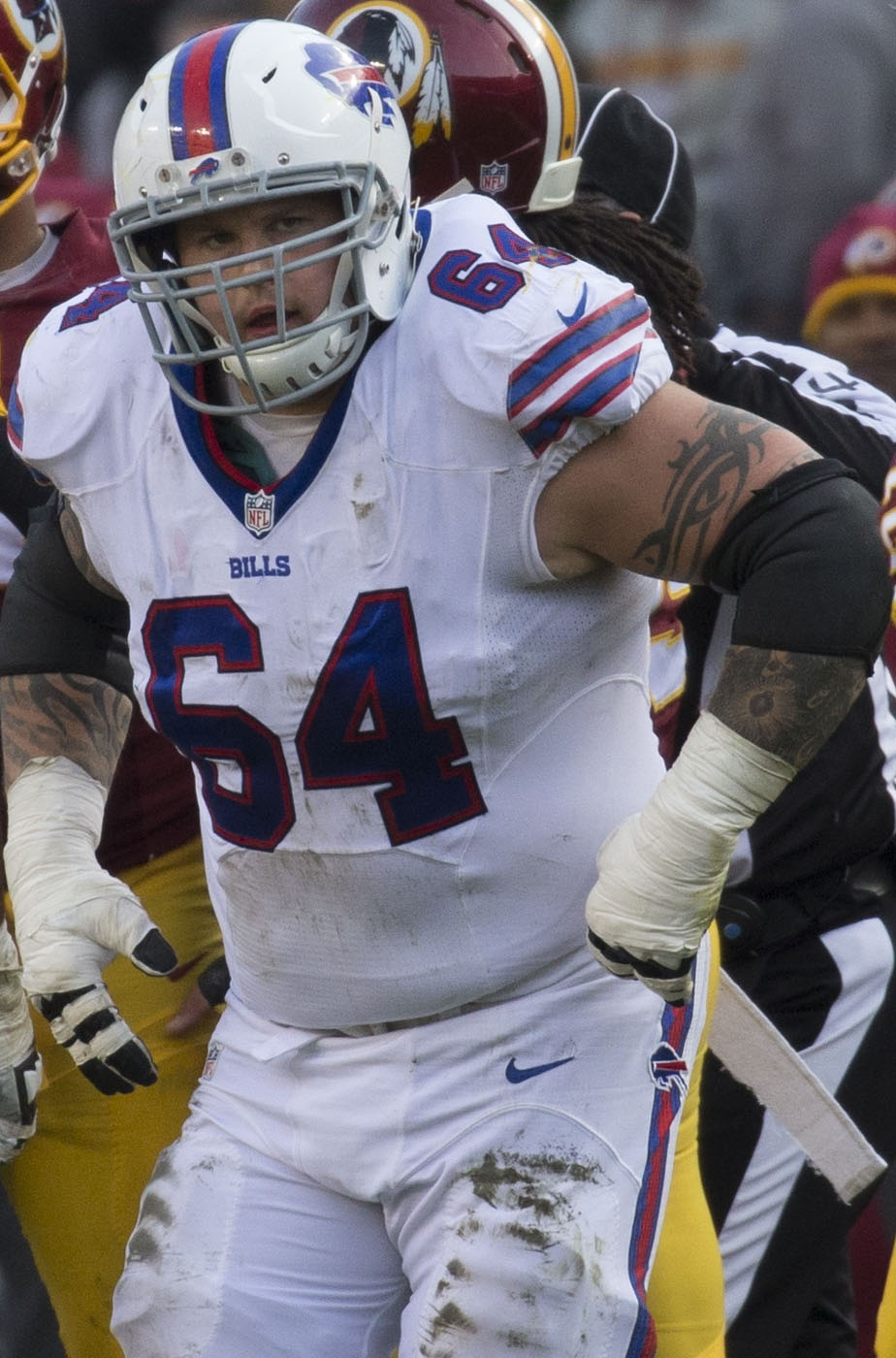
Richie Incognito

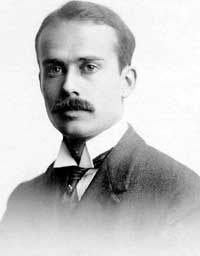
Dr. Clifford Beers

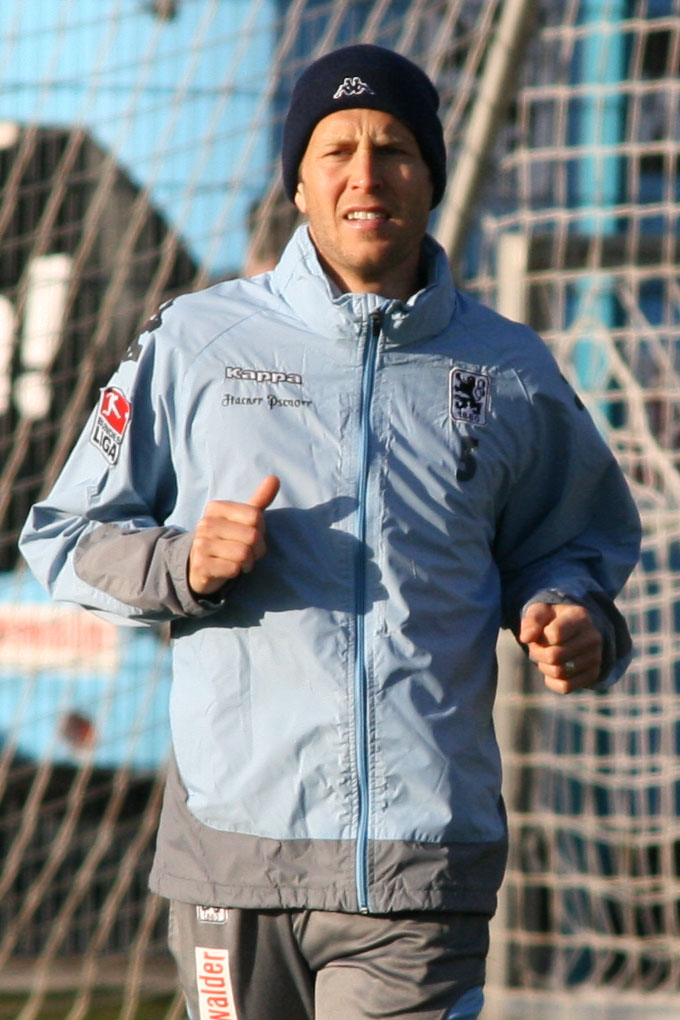
Gregg Berhalter

== Other ==
- Clifford Whittingham Beers (1876–1943), founder of the American mental hygiene movement
- George B. Cheever (1807–1890), abolitionist minister and writer
- Sophie Clark (1943–1962), the only African American victim of the Boston Strangler, Albert DeSalvo
- Arthur Hertzberg (1921–2006), Conservative rabbi and prominent Jewish-American scholar and activist
- John Lattimer (1914–2007), urologist who conducted extensive research on the Lincoln and Kennedy assassinations
- Charles Lindbergh (1902–1974), aviator
- Bernarr Macfadden (1868–1955), physical culture advocate
- Constance Morrow Morgan (1913–1995), educator and philanthropist
- Calvin J. Spann (1924–2015), original Tuskegee Airman and fighter pilot with the 100th Fighter Squadron of the 332nd Fighter Group
- Jayadvaita Swami (born 1949), writer, editor, publisher and Hare Krishna spiritual leader
