= Juwann Winfree =

American football player (born 1996)

Profile
- Position: Wide receiver

Personal information
- Born: September 4, 1996 (age 30); Manhattan, New York, U.S.
- Listed height: 6 ft 1 in (1.85 m)
- Listed weight: 210 lb (95 kg)

Career information
- High school: Dwight Morrow High School (Englewood, New Jersey)
- College: Maryland (2014); Coffeyville CC (2015); Colorado (2016–2018)
- NFL draft: 2019: 6th round, 187th overall pick

Career history
- Denver Broncos (2019); Green Bay Packers (2020–2022); Indianapolis Colts (2023–2024); Houston Texans (2025)*; Saskatchewan Roughriders (2026)*; Houston Texans (2026)*
- * Offseason or practice squad member only

Career NFL statistics
- Receptions: 9
- Receiving yards: 75
- Stats at Pro Football Reference

Juwann Winfree (born September 4, 1996) is an American professional football wide receiver. He played college football for the Colorado Buffaloes, and was selected by the Denver Broncos in the sixth round of the 2019 NFL draft.

== College career ==
Winfree first began his college career at the University of Maryland, where as a freshman, he finished the 2014 season with 158 receiving yards on 6 receptions. He was dismissed from the team due to an undisclosed code of conduct violation. He admitted to Coffeyville Community College for the 2015 season. After a year at Coffeyville, Winfree transferred to the University of Colorado. He did not play in 2016 due to a torn ACL he suffered from earlier off-season workouts. In 2017, he made his first NCAA appearance in three years, finishing the year with 325 receiving yards. During an injury-riddled 2018 season, he finished with 324 receiving yards.

=== College statistics ===
Year	Team	Position	GP	Receiving			
Year	Team	Position	GP	Rec	Yards	Avg	TD
2014	Maryland	WR	6	11	158	14.4	2
2017	Colorado	WR	7	21	325	15.5	2
2018	Colorado	WR	8	28	324	11.6	2
Total			21	60	807	13.5	6

== Professional career ==
Pre-draft measurables
Height	Weight	Arm length	Hand span	Wingspan	40-yard dash	10-yard split	20-yard split	20-yard shuttle	Three-cone drill	Vertical jump	Broad jump	Bench press
6 ft 1 1/8 in (1.86 m)	210 lb (95 kg)	31 1/2 in (0.80 m)	9 3/4 in (0.25 m)	6 ft 5 in (1.96 m)	4.53 s	1.63 s	2.62 s	4.25 s	6.97 s	33.0 in (0.84 m)	10 ft 5 in (3.18 m)	16 reps
All values from Pro Day

=== Denver Broncos ===
Winfree was selected by the Denver Broncos in the sixth round (187th overall) of the 2019 NFL draft. He played in three games before being placed on injured reserve on December 14, 2019.

On September 5, 2020, Winfree was waived by the Broncos.

=== Green Bay Packers ===
On October 1, 2020, Winfree was signed to the practice squad of the Green Bay Packers. He was elevated to the active roster on November 14 and December 12 for the team's weeks 10 and 14 games against the Jacksonville Jaguars and Detroit Lions, and reverted to the practice squad after each game. On January 26, 2021, Winfree signed a reserves/futures contract with the Packers.

On August 31, 2021, Packers released Winfree as part of their final roster cuts. He was signed to the practice squad the next day. He was elevated to the active roster on October 16, for the game against the Chicago Bears, in which he played 2 snaps, but finished a game without a target. He was reverted to practice squad next day. He was elevated to the active roster again on October 28 ahead of a Week 8 game against the Arizona Cardinals, during which he recorded his first NFL catch, a 12-yard pass from Aaron Rodgers. He finished the game with four catches for 30 yards. He was elevated to the active roster again on November 20 ahead of a Week 11 game against the Minnesota Vikings. On December 14, 2021, the Packers signed Winfree to their active roster.

On August 30, 2022, Winfree was waived and signed to the practice squad two days later. He was elevated from the practice squad to the active roster on September 10. Winfree was elevated from the practice squad to the active roster on September 24. He was elevated from the practice squad to the active roster on October 15. His practice squad contract with the team expired after the season on January 8, 2023.

=== Indianapolis Colts ===
On May 9, 2023, Winfree signed with the Indianapolis Colts. He was released on August 29, and re-signed to the practice squad. Winfree was promoted to the active roster on October 17, and was waived on December 9. He was signed back to the practice squad on December 19 and promoted to the active roster on January 2, 2024. He was placed on injured reserve on August 27.

=== Houston Texans ===
On August 19, 2025, Winfree signed with the Houston Texans. He was released on September 1.

=== Saskatchewan Roughriders ===
On February 10, 2026, Winfree signed with the Saskatchewan Roughriders of the Canadian Football League (CFL). He was released on May 13 and re-signed the following day. Winfree was released on May 30 as part of final roster cuts.

=== Houston Texans (second stint) ===
On August 10, 2026, Winfree signed with the Houston Texans. He was released by the Texans on August 24.

== NFL career statistics ==
=== Regular season ===
Year	Team	Games		Receiving					Fumbles	
Year	Team	GP	GS	Rec	Yds	Avg	Lng	TD	Fum	Lost
2019	DEN	3	0	0	0	0	0	0	0	0
2020	GB	2	0	0	0	0	0	0	0	0
2021	GB	7	0	8	58	7.3	12	0	0	0
2022	GB	3	0	1	17	17.0	17	0	0	0
2023	IND	8	1	0	0	0	0	0	0	0
Total		23	1	9	75	8.3	17	0	0	0
Source: pro-football-reference.com

=== Postseason ===
Year	Team	Games		Receiving					Fumbles	
Year	Team	GP	GS	Rec	Yds	Avg	Lng	TD	Fum	Lost
2021	GB	1	0	0	0	0	0	0	0	0
Total		1	0	0	0	0	0	0	0	0
Source: pro-football-reference.com

== Personal life ==
Winfree graduated from Academies at Englewood, a magnet sibling school to Dwight Morrow High School in Englewood, New Jersey. He received a Key to the City of Englewood from Mayor Michael Wildes on June 23, 2019, during an event at which his father announced the formation of Team Winfree Youth Foundation, a nonprofit that will host low-cost camps for football, soccer, and basketball, as well as leadership conferences for area youth.
