= Daniel Straus =

Daniel Straus may refer to:

- Daniel E. Straus (born 1957), American businessman, entrepreneur, real estate developer, philanthropist and minority owner of the Memphis Grizzlies
- Daniel Straus (fighter) (born 1984), American featherweight mixed martial arts fighter
- Daniel Straus (chemist), winner of a 2021 Blavatnik Award
