= Cauthen =

Cauthen is a surname. Notable people with the surname include:

- Paul Cauthen (born 1986), American singer-songwriter
- Steve Cauthen (born 1960), American jockey
- Terrance Cauthen (born 1976), American boxer
- Wayne A. Cauthen (born 1955), American politician
