= CareOne LLC =

American senior care provider

- Type: Private
- Industry: Health care
- Founded: 1999
- Headquarters: Fort Lee, New Jersey
- Area served: New Jersey, Massachusetts, Connecticut, Pennsylvania
- Key people: Daniel E. Straus – Chairman
- Services: Post-acute skilled nursing and assisted living facilities
- Number of employees: 15,000
- Website: www.care-one.com

CareOne LLC is a network of approximately 55 post-acute nursing and assisted living facilities primarily located in New Jersey and Massachusetts. Daniel E. Straus is the founder, chairman and CEO of the organization.

== History ==
Straus became involved in the healthcare industry in 1984 through leading Multicare Companies, Inc., a group of assisted living facilities in New Jersey. Multicare was purchased by Genesis Health Ventures, Inc. in 1997. Straus then founded CareOne LLC in 1999.

== Overview ==
CareOne LLC has approximately 55 nursing and assisted living centers in the US across several northeastern states. Approximately 35 facilities are located in New Jersey, making it the largest assisted living company in the state. CareOne LLC admits and discharges over 20,000 patients annually, per company figures.

CareOne LLC has also been nationally recognized for several successful fundraising efforts, including the Queen of Heart Ball for breast cancer research and the Valerie Fund, which benefits families of children with blood cancer. To date, CareOne LLC has raised over $5 million in philanthropic efforts.
