= Elias Zurita =

American soccer player

Personal information
- Date of birth: June 8, 1964 (age 62)
- Place of birth: Queens, New York
- Height: 5 ft 10 in (1.78 m)
- Position: Forward

Youth career
- 1982–1985: Southern Connecticut State University

Senior career*
Years	Team	Apps	(Gls)
1985–1986	Wichita Wings (indoor)	0	(0)
1986–1987	Chicago Sting (indoor)	11	(1)
1987–1988	Cleveland Force (indoor)	26	(3)
- * Club domestic league appearances and goals

Elias Zurita (born June 8, 1964), is a retired American soccer forward who played professionally in the Major Indoor Soccer League.

Zurita grew up in Englewood, New Jersey and graduated from Dwight Morrow High School. He was a three-year varsity letterman with the boys' soccer team, but lost most of his sophomore season after breaking his arm early in the year. In his junior and senior seasons, he scored 48 and 62 goals respectively as he led his team to consecutive state championship and garnered All State honors for himself. He attended Southern Connecticut State University, where he was a 1985 First Team NCAA Division II All American soccer player. In 1982, Zurita and his team mates finished runners-up in the NCAA Division II Men's Soccer Championship.

In 1985, the Wichita Wings selected Zurita in the Major Indoor Soccer League. He saw no playing time that season. In 1986, he moved to the Chicago Sting before finishing his career with the Cleveland Force during the 1987-1988 MISL season.
