= Englewood Cliffs Public Schools =

School district in Bergen County, New Jersey, US

Address
- 143 Charlotte Place Englewood Cliffs, Bergen County, New Jersey, 07632; United States
- Coordinates: 40.875166°N 73.956834°W

District information
- Grades: PreK-8
- Superintendent: Jennifer Brower
- Business administrator: Jessenia Kan
- Schools: 2

Students and staff
- Enrollment: 439 (as of 2020–21)
- Faculty: 48.3 FTEs
- Student–teacher ratio: 9.1:1

Other information
- District Factor Group: I
- Website: www.englewoodcliffs.org
Ind.	Per pupil	District spending	Rank (*)	K-8 average	%± vs. average
1A	Total Spending	$21,881	57	$18,891	15.8%
1	Budgetary Cost	17,178	55	14,159	21.3%
2	Classroom Instruction	9,263	40	8,659	7.0%
6	Support Services	4,435	63	2,167	104.7%
8	Administrative Cost	1,984	61	1,547	28.2%
10	Operations & Maintenance	1,447	21	1,612	−10.2%
13	Extracurricular Activities	10	1	104	−90.4%
16	Median Teacher Salary	66,255	50	61,136
Data from NJDoE 2014 Taxpayers' Guide to Education Spending. *Of K-8 districts with 401-750 students. Lowest spending=1; Highest=64

The Englewood Cliffs Public Schools is a community public school district that serves children in pre-kindergarten through eighth grade from Englewood Cliffs, in Bergen County, in the U.S. state of New Jersey.

As of the 2020–21 school year, the district, comprised of two schools, had an enrollment of 439 students and 48.3 classroom teachers (on an FTE basis), for a student–teacher ratio of 9.1:1.

Based on 2013 data for the Upper School, 78.8% of students speak English as their primary language at home, with Korean (9.7%) being the most common non-English language. 1.8% of students are classified as having limited English proficiency. 45.6% of students in the school were classified as Asian / Pacific Islander in the 2011-12 school year.

The district is classified by the New Jersey Department of Education as being in District Factor Group "I", the second-highest of eight groupings. District Factor Groups organize districts statewide to allow comparison by common socioeconomic characteristics of the local districts. From lowest socioeconomic status to highest, the categories are A, B, CD, DE, FG, GH, I and J.

For high school, public school students attend Dwight Morrow High School in Englewood, as part of a sending/receiving relationship with the Englewood Public School District that dates back to 1967. As of the 2020–21 school year, the high school had an enrollment of 1,049 students and 84.8 classroom teachers (on an FTE basis), for a student–teacher ratio of 12.4:1.

== History ==
Students from Englewood Cliffs had attended Fort Lee High School, until growth in the Fort Lee School District limited capacity for receiving students. As a replacement for its students in grades 9-12, a contract was signed with the Englewood Public School District under which students from Englewood Cliffs would begin to attend Dwight Morrow High School starting in the 1967-68 school year.

With few Englewood Cliffs students attending Dwight Morrow, a school with a majority African-American student body, officials from Englewood Cliffs have made repeated efforts dating back to the mid-1980s to end the relationship with Englewood and switch over to have students attend Tenafly High School, a practice that many parents were doing by paying tuition to attend the Tenafly school. In 2003, the New Jersey State Board of Education overturned an injunction that prohibited other public schools from accepting students from Englewood Cliffs on a tuition basis, arguing that the establishment of the magnet Academies@Englewood program within Dwight Morrow will allow the Englewood district to draw white students to the district. In 2013, the Englewood Cliffs district announced plans to consider ending the sending relationship to Dwight Morrow by creating its own high school, possibly in conjunction with the Englewood Cliffs campus of Saint Peter's University. In 2016 the State of New Jersey began requiring the Englewood Cliffs district to pay tuition for students enrolled in Academies@Englewood. Therefore, in 2017 the district continued efforts to leave the send/receive partnership.

== Awards and recognition ==
In 2022, the United States Department of Education announced that Upper School was named as a National Blue Ribbon School, along with eight other schools in the state and 297 schools nationwide.

== Schools ==
Schools in the district (with 2020–21 enrollment data from the National Center for Education Statistics) are:

- North Cliff School with 139 students in grades PreK–2
  - Colin Winch, principal
- Upper School with 292 students in grades 3–8
  - Colin Winch, principal

== Administration ==
Core members of the district's administration are:

- Jennifer Brower, superintendent of schools
- Jessenia Kan, board secretary and business administrator

== Board of education ==
The district's board of education, comprised of nine members, sets policy and oversees the fiscal and educational operation of the district through its administration. As a Type II school district, the board's trustees are elected directly by voters to serve three-year terms of office on a staggered basis, with three seats up for election each year held (since 2012) as part of the November general election. The board appoints a superintendent to oversee the district's day-to-day operations and a business administrator to supervise the business functions of the district.
