= John F. Callinan =

American judge (1935-2025)

Sheriff of Cape May County
- In office 2002–2008
- Preceded by: Raymond D. Lewis
- Succeeded by: Gary G. Schaffer

Judge of the New Jersey Superior Court for the 1st Vicinage
- In office September 1, 1982 – 2002
- Appointed by: Thomas Kean

Solicitor of Lower Township, New Jersey
- In office 1980–1982
- Preceded by: Bruce M. Gorman
- Succeeded by: Bruce M. Gorman

Personal details
- Born: John Francis Callinan; 1935 Newark, New Jersey
- Died: July 31, 2025 (aged 89–90) Millsboro, Delaware
- Education: Dwight Morrow High School
- Alma mater: Seton Hall University; Fordham Law School

Military service
- Allegiance: United States
- Branch/service: United States Army; United States Air Force

John Francis Callinan (1935 – July 31, 2025) was a judge of the New Jersey Superior Court.

== Education and early career ==
Born in Newark, New Jersey, Callinan was raised in Edgewater, New Jersey, and was a graduate of Dwight Morrow High School. Callinan also served in both the United States Army and the United States Air Force. In the 1960s, Callinan was an officer for the Bergen County Police Department, and then with the New Jersey State Police. Callinan would go on to graduate from Seton Hall University and Fordham Law School. Callinan would go on to practice law and become a partner of the firm of Perskie-Callinan in Wildwood, New Jersey, and serve as solicitor of Lower Township, New Jersey.

=== New Jersey Superior Judge service ===
Callinan, a resident of Wildwood Crest, New Jersey, was appointed by Governor Thomas Kean and sworn in as New Jersey Superior Court Judge for the 1st Vicinage on September 1, 1982. Callinan would serve on the Bench for twenty years, retiring in 2002.

== Later life ==
Callinan would serve as Sheriff of Cape May County from 2002 to 2009.

Callinan died at his home in Millsboro, Delaware, on July 31, 2025 at the age of 90.

== Electoral history ==
=== Cape May County Sheriff ===
2005 Cape May County election for sheriff
Party	Candidate	Votes	%
Republican	John F. Callinan	18,172	59.68%
Independent	Robert Hartman	12,257	40.25%
Total votes		30,429	99.93%

2002 Cape May County election for sheriff
Party	Candidate	Votes	%
Republican	John F. Callinan	19,260	60.28%
Democratic	S. Harvey Roach	12,683	39.70%
Total votes		31,943	99.98%
