= Crazy Nanny's =

Lesbian bar in New York City from 1991 to 2004

- Interactive map of Crazy Nanny's
- Address: 21 7th Ave. South; New York City, New York; United States
- Coordinates: 40°43′49″N 74°00′16″W
- Owner: Elaine Romagnoli

Construction
- Opened: 1991; 35 years ago
- Closed: 2004; 22 years ago

Crazy Nanny's was a lesbian bar located at 21 7th Ave. South in the West Village in New York City. It was founded in 1991.

== History ==
Elaine Romagnoli established Crazy Nanny's in 1991 in the space of a former jazz club. The bar spanned two floors and drew a racially diverse patronage. Described as “a lesbian fun park," the bar held special events such as Strap On Sundays, oriented toward lesbians interested in leather fetishes; these happenings included dungeon technique demos. Other events at Crazy Nanny's included fundraisers to combat the AIDS epidemic. Activities at the bar included trivia nights, karaoke nights, drag queen performances, and dancing. The bar closed in 2004 when Romagnoli sold it upon her retirement.

== See also ==
- Lesbian Bar Project
- LGBTQ culture in New York City
