= Academies at Englewood =

High school in Bergen County, New Jersey, USA

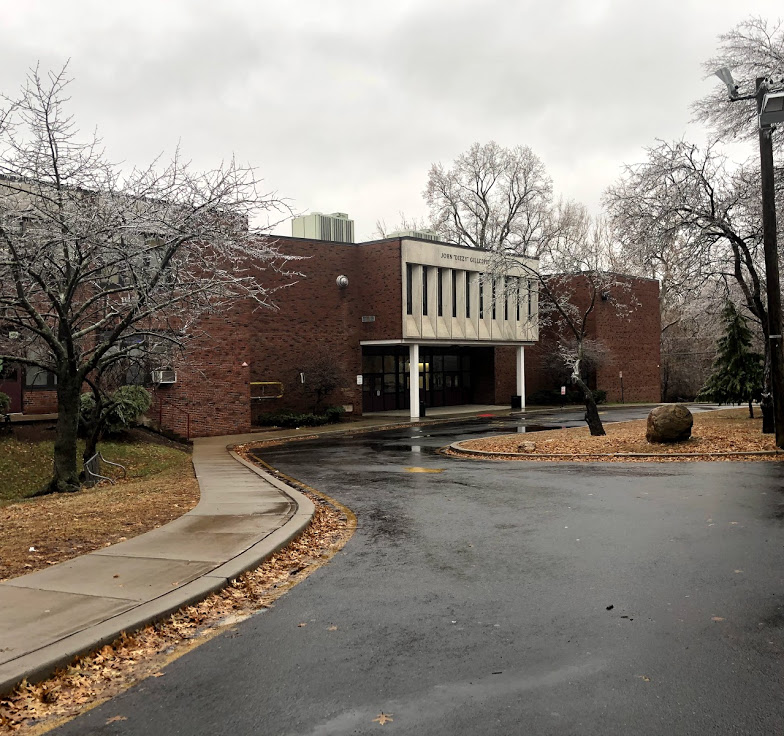
- The Auditorium at the Academies at Englewood

Location
- 274 Knickerbocker Road; Englewood, Bergen County, New Jersey 07631; 40.907214°N 73.983461°W

Information
- Type: Public, Magnet High School
- Established: 2002
- School district: Englewood Public School District (EPSD)
- Principal: Joseph Armental
- Grades: 9–12
- Website: www.epsd.org/o/academies

The Academies at Englewood is a tuition-free college-preparatory public magnet academic program in Englewood, New Jersey that is part of (and not separate from) Dwight Morrow High School. The school is organized into five specialized academies in the areas of Medical Science, Business & Finance, Legal Studies, Computer Science, and Engineering & Technology. Founded in 2002, the state-funded college-preparatory school serves students in the ninth to twelfth grades in Bergen County, New Jersey, and was established to attract elite students across the county to an "academically-challenging, high-performing school," as well as raise the standard of public education in Bergen County. The school is commonly referred to as AE, or the Academies, and is part of the Englewood Public School District.

The school requires students in their final year of study to participate in a year-long internship each Wednesday in a field of interest, called Senior Experience. The academy also offers students access to technologies and labs rarely found in a high school setting. There are 18 academic departments at AE: Biology, Medicine, Chemistry, Physics, Business, Economics, Mathematics, Law, Engineering, Technology, English, History, World Language, Music/Performing Arts, Visual Arts, Heath/Physical Education, College Counseling, and Senior Experience. The school is structured similar to a university, with various academic departments, specialized majors, and career and technical education.

== Establishment ==
As a result of the Board of Education of Englewood vs. Board of Education of Tenafly vs. Board of Education of Englewood Cliffs fifteen-year quarrel, the Englewood Public School District and the Supreme Court of New Jersey, under direction of Bergen County Academies founder Dr. John Grieco, the state-funded college-preparatory school serves students in the ninth to twelfth grades in Bergen County, New Jersey, and was established to attract elite students across the county to an "academically-challenging, high-performing school," secured $25 million for a new magnet high school program known as the Academies at Englewood in 2002. The school was established in hopes of attracting high-performing students in Bergen County, and to raise the standards of public education in the state of New Jersey. Unlike other county schools, the school does not have to meet any quotas or limits as to how many students can be accepted from a particular school district/borough, as it is a school of choice funded by the state.

The Academies at Englewood includes five specialized academies. The school was established in 2002 with four academies: the Academy for Finance & Business (AFB), Academy for Information Systems (ISA), Academy for Law and Public Safety (ALPS), and Academy for Pre-Engineering (APET). A fifth academy, the Academy for BioMedicine (ABM), was added in 2004. The school graduated its first class in 2006, with a graduating class of 91 at the time. The five academies are considered and recognized by the US Department of Education and the New Jersey Department of Education as separate schools under the parent magnet school.

== School ==
=== Admission ===
Admission to the Academies at Englewood is highly selective, as the process includes a review of middle school transcripts, standardized test scores, an entrance test, letters of recommendation, and an interview with a panel of faculty. Most applicants attend an open house early in the fall. As of 2019, an average of 110 students are accepted to the academies each year, from nearly 1200 applicants, making the Academies at Englewood one of the most selective high schools in the state of New Jersey. Students apply to the Academies during the fall of their eighth grade year, and are notified of acceptance by late-January.

=== Core education ===
In addition to academy-specific classes, the school offers over fifteen AP courses. Along with their major, students are required to take four years of mathematics, science, history, English literature, foreign language, and physical education. Students can also take college-level classes as early as ninth grade.

== The Academies ==
=== Academy for BioMedicine (ABM) ===
Students in the BioMedicine Academy take a four-year college-level major with courses on the fundamentals of medicine as well as biomedical research.

=== Academy for Law & Public Safety (ALPS) ===
The Law and Public Safety Academy is a four-year pre-collegiate course that gauges its focus on helping students gain substantive knowledge about the legal system, and practical skills like problem-solving, public speaking, and writing that can be transferred to other disciplines.

=== Academy for Information Systems (ISA) ===
The Information Systems Academy, also known as the Academy for Computer Science, is a four-year pre-collegiate course in which students understand the fundamentals of computer science, logistics, programming, hacking, cybersecurity, networking, and IT essentials.

=== Academy for Business & Finance (ABF) ===
The Academy for Business and Finance is a four-year college-level course focused on business and finance.

=== Academy for Pre-Engineering (APE) ===
The Pre-Engineering Academy is a four-year pre-collegiate course in which students understand and study the concepts of engineering.

== Faculty ==
There is approximately a ten-to-one (10/1) student/teacher ratio on the high school campus. In 2017, 9% of faculty held a doctorate (Ph.D.), 70% had a master's degree, and 21% had a bachelor's degree.

== Senior Experience ==
Ninety-nine percent (99%) of graduating seniors progress to a college education. Seniors participate in a year-long internship as part of the Senior Experience. Most students are suggested internships at affiliated corporations related to their majors. Additionally, students can gain both research and experience by taking an internship at Englewood Hospital. The Senior Experience Program partners 12th graders in mentor internships one day per week for the full high school year. Students report to corporations and post-secondary institutions in pursuit of authentic, experiential learning every Thursday. This program is endorsed by the New Jersey State Department of Education.

== Rankings ==
The school was ranked as the 248th best public high school in New Jersey and 7947th in the United States by the U.S. News & World Report 2019 rankings. It was recognized as the 109th Best College Prep Public High School in New Jersey and 212th Best Public High School for STEM in New Jersey by Niche in 2021.

== Notable alumni ==
- Franky Martinez (born 1995), soccer player who plays as a defender for Lexington SC in the USL League One
