= Franky Martinez =

American soccer player

Personal information
- Date of birth: 9 August 1995 (age 31)
- Place of birth: New York City, New York, United States
- Height: 6 ft 1 in (1.85 m)
- Position: Defender

Youth career
- 2013-14: Players Development Academy

College career
Years	Team	Apps	(Gls)
2014	Iona Gaels	18	(1)
2016–2018	UMass Lowell River Hawks	40	(0)

Senior career*
Years	Team	Apps	(Gls)
2020	Los Angeles Force	2	(0)
2021	Stumptown AC	23	(0)
2022	Chattanooga FC	22	(0)
2023	Lexington SC	8	(0)
- * Club domestic league appearances and goals as of October 16, 2023

Franky Martinez (born August 9, 1995) is an American soccer player who last played as a defender for Lexington SC in the USL League One.

== Career ==
=== Youth, College & Amateur ===
Martinez attended Academies at Englewood, also playing club soccer with the New York Red Bulls Academy. Shortly after, Martinez went on to play with PDA academy, helping them win the National Championship in 2013.

In 2014, Martinez attended Iona College to play college soccer. He played one season with the Gaels, making 18 appearances and scoring a goal, earning an All-MAAC Rookie Team selection. In 2016, Martinez transferred to the University of Massachusetts Lowell where he made 40 appearances and tallied one assist for the River Hawks.

While at college, Martinez appeared in the USL PDL, later rebranded as USL League Two. In 2016, he made 11 appearances for Lehigh Valley United and played in three games for the Boston Bolts in 2018.

=== Professional ===
On January 14, 2019, Martinez was selected 69th overall in the 2019 MLS SuperDraft by Sporting Kansas City.

In August 2020, Martinez signed with National Independent Soccer Association side Los Angeles Force. After a single season with the Force, Martinez moved to fellow NISA side Stumptown AC and went on to make 23 starts for the club. In 2022, he signed with a new club, joining Chattanooga FC.

On January 14, 2023, Martinez signed with USL League One side Lexington SC ahead of their inaugural season.
