= Elaine Romagnoli =

American businesswoman (1942–2021)

- Born: April 22, 1942; Englewood, New Jersey
- Died: October 28, 2021 (aged 79); New York City
- Occupation(s): Businesswoman, community leader
- Years active: 1972-2004

Elaine Lillian Romagnoli (April 22, 1942 – October 28, 2021) was an American businesswoman and community leader. She founded and ran successful restaurants and lesbian bars, including Bonnie & Clyde's, The Cubby Hole, and Crazy Nanny's in New York City.

== Early life ==
Romagnoli was born in Englewood, New Jersey, the daughter of August (Gus) Romagnoli and Claire Ines Fiorina Romagnoli, and raised in nearby Palisades Park.

== Career ==
Romagnoli became a well-known figure in New York's West Village neighborhood in 1972 as hostess of Bonnie & Clyde's, a lesbian bar owned by Louis Corso; she welcomed a celebrity clientele including Gloria Steinem and Yoko Ono, and held fundraisers and other community events. After Bonnie & Clyde's closed, she opened the Cubby Hole in 1983; Stormé DeLarverie was the Cubby Hole's bouncer for a time. She also ran a restaurant, Bonnie's by the Bay, in New Suffolk, and a tapas bar called Sunset Strip. In 1991, all of her 1980s businesses had ended, and she opened another bar, Crazy Nanny's. She sold Crazy Nanny's in 2004, just before she retired.

Romagnoli was active in the North Fork Women for Women Fund on the East End of Long Island, NY; during her term as its president in 2000, the organization held North Fork's first Gay Pride Dance at a vineyard, Castello de Borghese.

== Personal life ==
Romagnoli died in 2021, aged 79 years, at her home in New York City. Her memorial service was held at the Stonewall Inn.
