= Chris Hewitt =

American football player and coach (born 1974)

Indianapolis Colts
- Title: Pass game coordinator/secondary coach

Personal information
- Born: July 22, 1974 (age 52); Kingston, Jamaica
- Listed height: 6 ft 0 in (1.83 m)
- Listed weight: 210 lb (95 kg)

Career information
- Position: Safety (No. 23)
- High school: Dwight Morrow (Englewood, New Jersey, U.S.)
- College: Cincinnati
- NFL draft: 1997: undrafted

Career history

Playing
- New Orleans Saints (1997–1999)

Coaching
- Notre Dame (2003) Assistant strength and conditioning coach; Rutgers (2004–2011) Running backs & cornerbacks coach; Baltimore Ravens (2012–2024); Defensive back coach (2012-2019); Pass defense coordinator (2020-2021); Pass game coordinator & secondary coach (2022-2023); Assistant head coach, pass game coordinator, and secondary coach (2024); Indianapolis Colts (2025–present) Pass game coordinator & secondary coach

Awards and highlights
- As coach: Super Bowl champion (XLVII)
- Stats at Pro Football Reference

Christopher Horace Hewitt (born July 22, 1974) is a former American football safety and current pass game coordinator, and secondary coach for the Indianapolis Colts of the National Football League (NFL).

== Early life ==
Hewitt was born in Kingston, Jamaica and grew up in Englewood, New Jersey, where he attended Dwight Morrow High School.

== College career ==
He played for the Cincinnati Bearcats football team at the collegiate level. Hewitt's 31.50 kickoff return average in the 1993 season ranks second on the all-time rankings for the Cincinnati Bearcats, while his 742 career kickoff return yards rank ninth and his 28.54 career yards per kickoff returns place him first on the school's rankings.

== Professional career ==
Pre-draft measurables
Height	Weight	Arm length	Hand span	40-yard dash	10-yard split	20-yard split	Bench press
5 ft 11 7/8 in (1.83 m)	212 lb (96 kg)	32 1/2 in (0.83 m)	9 1/4 in (0.23 m)	4.78 s	1.70 s	2.82 s	10 reps
All values from NFL Combine

Hewitt played as a defensive back and on special teams for the New Orleans Saints in 1997, starting two games and finishing the season with 12 tackles and a fumble recovery as a defensive back. In 1998, he again started two games and had 9 tackles and two sacks. In his third and final season with the Saints, Hewitt was limited to one tackle and a sack.

== Coaching career ==
Hewitt joined the coaching staff at Rutgers under Greg Schiano, where he spent eight years, including as running backs coach and defensive backs coach. As part of the NFL's Minority Coaching Fellowship Program, Hewitt worked on the staffs of the Cleveland Browns and Philadelphia Eagles, as well as the Ravens, who hired him in February 2012 as the team's assistant special teams coach. Hewitt was brought into the Ravens by head coach John Harbaugh, who had been Hewitt's special teams coach when he was playing at the age of 17 as a freshman at the University of Cincinnati. Hewitt was part of the Ravens coaching staff for the Raven's victory at Super Bowl XLVII in 2013, which was played in New Orleans at the Mercedes-Benz Superdome, where Hewitt played in the NFL with the Saints. The Ravens promoted Hewitt to pass defense coordinator on February 26, 2020.

On February 1, 2025, Hewitt left the Ravens and joined the Indianapolis Colts as their secondary coach and pass game coordinator.
