= Lou Tepe =

American football player (born 1930)

No. 61, 55
- Positions: Center, linebacker

Personal information
- Born: June 18, 1930 (age 96); North Bergen, New Jersey, U.S.
- Listed height: 6 ft 2 in (1.88 m)
- Listed weight: 208 lb (94 kg)

Career information
- High school: Dwight Morrow (Englewood, New Jersey)
- College: Duke
- NFL draft: 1953: 30th round, 354th overall pick

Career history
- Pittsburgh Steelers (1953–1955)

Awards and highlights
- Second-team All-SoCon (1951)

Career NFL statistics
- Games played: 34
- Games started: 18
- Fumble recoveries: 5
- Stats at Pro Football Reference

Lou Tepe (born June 18, 1930), was an American football player who played in the National Football League for the Pittsburgh Steelers.

== Early life ==
Born in North Bergen, New Jersey, Tepe grew up in Englewood, New Jersey, where he played high school football at Dwight Morrow High School. Tepe had received scholarship offers from four colleges, and chose Duke University because it gave him the opportunity to get as far away as possible from where he grew up in New Jersey. Tepe graduated from Duke in 1953 with a degree in engineering, and ultimately went into the field as a profession after completing his three-season NFL career.

== Professional career ==
He was selected by the Pittsburgh Steelers, having been drafted as a center in the 30th round of the 1953 NFL draft as the 354th selection overall. Filling a need on the team, he shifted to outside linebacker and started at that position for two years. Tepe had been signed by the Toronto Argonauts of the Canadian Football League after the 1953 NFL season, but was released by the Argonauts in June 1954 as he was still under contract to Pittsburgh. Tepe was the right linebacker for the Steelers in all 12 games of the 1954 season, playing on a team that was pioneering the use of the modern-standard 4–3 defense alignment with four down linemen and three linebackers. He was one of the last players to make the Steelers team in the 1955 season, having made the final cut that saw Johnny Unitas eliminated from the team. While with the Steelers, Tepe wore jersey number 55 in 1955 and 61 during both the 1954 and 1955 seasons.

== Personal life ==
Tepe moved with his family to Denver in 1967. From 1995 to 2000 he was an assistant football coach at Littleton High School and in the fall of 2007, Tepe signed on to be an assistant coach for the football team of John F. Kennedy High School in Denver. Tepe has worked to use his influence with the National Football League to convince each NFL team to donate $100,000 that would be used to provide counseling to high school students in each team's home city.

Tepe's older brother, Harold, was killed in action serving during World War II under General George S. Patton in North Africa and was buried in Tunisia.
