= Robert Levithan =

American gay writer and HIV/AIDS activist

Robert Levithan (April 11, 1951 - May 3, 2016), was an American gay writer and HIV/AIDS activist. Levithan was involved with HIV/AIDS since the early 1980s, and wrote prolifically on living with HIV and other issues related to LGBTQ culture. He died from cancer on May 13, 2016.

== Early and personal life ==
Levithan was born in Manhattan on April 11, 1951, the third son of Alice and Lou Levithan. He was raised in Englewood, New Jersey, where he attended public school. He graduated from Dwight Morrow High School in 1969. He earned a bachelor's degree in history from the University of Pennsylvania and a master's degree in Transformational Counseling from Southwestern College.

Levithan was the uncle of author David Levithan.

== HIV/AIDS activism ==
Levithan was diagnosed with HIV in the 1980s.

In 1984 Levithan trained at GMHC as a buddy and began volunteer work with seriously ill patients. In 1986, he founded an alternative support group, The Healing Circle, which focused on serving people with terminal illnesses. By 1987, the group had several hundred attendees at three weekly groups. The Manhattan Center for Living was formed and then in 1991 Levithan began working as a counselor, group facilitator, and later, board member at Friends in Deed.

== Creative work ==
Levithan was a consult for the 1994 short film Trevor.

While working as a theatrical producer, Levithan produced the original performances of The Vagina Monologues and Celeste Lecesne’s two plays One-Man Band and Word of Mouth.

In 2012, he published The New 60: Outliving Yourself and Reinventing a Future, which was a compilation of his blog posts. He was also a columnist for Oprah Winfrey's interiors magazine, and had recently finished writing a children's book at the time of his death.
