= Daniel E. Straus =

American business executive (born 1956)

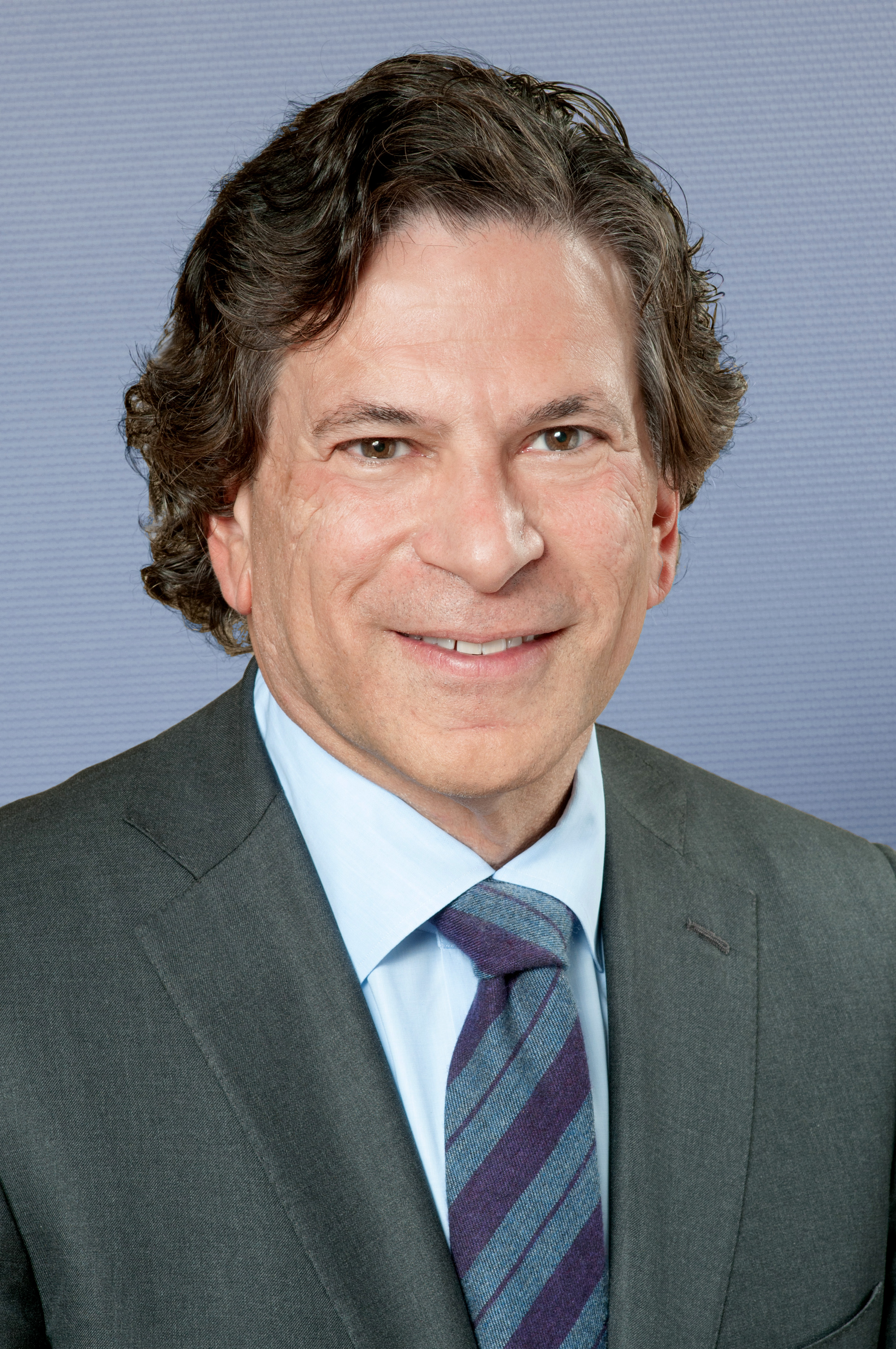
- Born: 1956 (age 69–70); New York, New York, U.S.
- Education: Columbia University (A.B. Political science); New York University (J.D.)
- Occupations: Founder, chairman and CEO, CareOne LLC; Chairman, CEO and President, Care Realty, LLC; Founder, The Straus Group; Co-founder, chairman and CEO, Aveta Inc.; Chairman, InnovaCare Health; Former Vice Chairman, Memphis Grizzlies
- Years active: 1999–present
- Website: danielestraus.org

Daniel E. Straus is an American entrepreneur, investor, and philanthropist. He is the founder, chairman, and controlling shareholder of several operating businesses in healthcare services, real estate, and financial advisory activities, with reported combined revenues exceeding $5 billion. Through his family office, The Straus Group, Straus has participated as a principal investor in transactions involving operating businesses, real estate development, private equity, venture capital, private credit, and sports and entertainment. He has also made philanthropic contributions to institutions including New York University School of Law and Columbia University.

== Early life and education ==
Straus was born and raised in Brooklyn, New York. He graduated from Yeshiva University High School for Boys in 1974. He earned an A.B. in political science from Columbia University. He has also served on the Columbia College Board of Visitors. He subsequently earned a J.D. from New York University School of Law in 1981.

Prior to entering business, Straus practiced law as an associate at Paul, Weiss, Rifkind, Wharton & Garrison in New York City.

== Business career ==
=== Multicare Companies ===
In 1984, Straus left Paul, Weiss, Rifkind, Wharton & Garrison to co-found Multicare Companies Inc. with his brother, Moshael Straus, building on a portfolio of four nursing homes inherited from their father, Joseph Straus. Under his leadership as president and chief executive officer, Multicare expanded to more than 170 locations across the eastern and midwestern United States.

In 1993, Multicare completed an initial public offering and was listed on the New York Stock Exchange. The company was sold in 1997 to Genesis Health Ventures, Inc. for approximately $1.382 billion, including assumed debt.

=== CareOne ===
Following the sale of Multicare, Straus founded CareOne LLC in the late 1990s. The company develops, operates, and manages inpatient healthcare properties in the New York metropolitan area and surrounding regions. Its services include independent living, assisted living, memory care, hospice, home care, subacute care, and inpatient rehabilitation. The company reports having served more than 100,000 individuals since its founding.

=== Aveta and InnovaCare Health ===
In the early 2000s, Straus founded Aveta Health, a physician practice management company operating primarily in California. Aveta was sold to a subsidiary of UnitedHealth Group in 2012. He subsequently founded InnovaCare Health, which provides Medicare Advantage plans and serves approximately 500,000 members in Puerto Rico. InnovaCare was recapitalized in 2019. Straus served as its chairman and controlling shareholder throughout his tenure at both companies.

=== Other Operating Businesses ===
Straus has also been associated with several healthcare-related businesses, including Partners Pharmacy, Tech Pharmacy, Ascend Hospice, Ascend Homecare, and Avantum Pharmacy.

He has also participated in the development and construction of healthcare and residential real estate projects in the northeastern United States.

== The Straus Group and investment activities ==
Straus manages The Straus Group, a family investment office that invests in real estate, private equity, private credit, hedge funds, venture capital, sports, and entertainment.

== Real estate ==
=== 33 East 74th Street (Whitney Condos) ===
Straus developed 33 East 74th Street on the Upper East Side of Manhattan, known as the Whitney Condos. In 2010, through an affiliated entity, he acquired a group of brownstone and townhouse properties from the Whitney Museum of American Art following the museum’s relocation to the Meatpacking District.

The project involved the renovation and conversion of the existing buildings into condominium residences while retaining their exterior facades. Architectural work was carried out by Beyer Blinder Belle, with interior design by Alexandra Champalimaud. The development was completed in 2016 and generated reported sales of approximately $255 million.

=== 181 MacDougal Street ===
Straus also developed 181 MacDougal Street, a seven-story mixed-use building in Greenwich Village, Manhattan, containing 16 residential units and one commercial unit.

== Sports and entertainment ==
Straus has been involved in investments in sports and entertainment. From 2012 to 2018, he was a minority owner and Vice Chairman of the Memphis Grizzlies of the National Basketball Association (NBA), through an affiliated entity.

He was also an investor in several franchises in the NBA Development League (now the NBA G League), which serves as the NBA’s minor league system.

In addition to basketball, Straus has invested in motorsports through Alpine Racing, a team competing in the FIA Formula One World Championship.

== Philanthropy ==
Straus has supported New York University School of Law and has served on its Board of Trustees since 1998. He has also served on several committees, including the Executive Committee, Investment Committee, and Ancillary Income Committee, and has participated in reunion fundraising efforts.

=== NYU School of Law ===
In 2009, Straus made a gift to establish the Straus Institute for the Advanced Study of Law & Justice at New York University School of Law, named in honor of his parents, Joseph and Gwendolyn Straus. The institute supports academic research and hosts scholars focused on issues related to law and justice.

His philanthropic contributions have also included the establishment of the Joseph Straus Scholarship and the Joseph Straus Professorship, named for his father, an alumnus of NYU School of Law.

=== Columbia University ===
Straus has supported Columbia University, his undergraduate alma mater, including through philanthropic contributions and service on the Columbia College Board of Visitors.

=== Employee and Community Philanthropy ===
Straus has supported employee and community-focused charitable initiatives through his businesses. Following Hurricane Sandy in 2012, he contributed to relief efforts and supported employees and community members affected by the storm. He also established a charitable fund to assist employees facing serious illnesses, including cancer, to address expenses not covered by insurance.

Organizations associated with his businesses have also participated in fundraising efforts for groups including the Valerie Fund, the Breast Cancer Research Foundation, and the Make-A-Wish Foundation. In 2017, Straus contributed to disaster relief efforts following major hurricanes affecting Puerto Rico, Texas, and Florida.

=== Jewish and Israeli Causes ===
Straus has supported organizations related to Jewish and Israeli causes, including AMIT, an organization that operates educational and youth programs in Israel. His philanthropic activities have also included support for other Jewish community organizations and institutions through the Daniel E. and Joyce G. Straus Family Foundation.
