= Englewood Public School District =

School district in Bergen County, New Jersey, US

Address
- 12 Tenafly Road Englewood, Bergen County, New Jersey, 07631; United States
- Coordinates: 40.897206°N 73.979371°W

District information
- Grades: pre-K to 12
- Superintendent: Marnie Hazelton
- Business administrator: Michael Steinmetz
- Schools: 5

Students and staff
- Enrollment: 2,955 (as of 2023–24)
- Faculty: 259.7 FTEs
- Student–teacher ratio: 11.4:1

Other information
- District Factor Group: DE
- Website: www.epsd.org
| Ind. | Per pupil | District spending | Rank (*) | K-12 average | %± vs. average |
|---|---|---|---|---|---|
| 1A | Total Spending | $21,231 | 61 | $18,891 | 12.4% |
| 1 | Budgetary Cost | 16,544 | 63 | 14,783 | 11.9% |
| 2 | Classroom Instruction | 9,368 | 61 | 8,763 | 6.9% |
| 6 | Support Services | 2,924 | 61 | 2,392 | 22.2% |
| 8 | Administrative Cost | 1,811 | 59 | 1,485 | 22.0% |
| 10 | Operations & Maintenance | 2,073 | 62 | 1,783 | 16.3% |
| 13 | Extracurricular Activities | 337 | 18 | 268 | 25.7% |
| 16 | Median Teacher Salary | 58,950 | 17 | 64,043 |
Data from NJDoE 2014 Taxpayers' Guide to Education Spending. *Of K-12 districts with 1,800-3,500 students. Lowest spending=1; Highest=68

The Englewood Public School District is a comprehensive community public school district that serves students in pre-kindergarten through twelfth grade from Englewood, in Bergen County, in the U.S. state of New Jersey.

As of the 2023–24 school year, the district, comprised of five schools, had an enrollment of 2,955 students and 259.7 classroom teachers (on an FTE basis), for a student–teacher ratio of 11.4:1.

Students from Englewood Cliffs attend Dwight Morrow High School, as part of a sending/receiving relationship with the Englewood Cliffs Public Schools.

The district participates in the Interdistrict Public School Choice Program at Dwight Morrow High School, having been approved on November 2, 1999, as one of the first ten districts statewide to participate in the program, which allows non-resident students to attend school in the district at no cost to their parents, with tuition covered by the resident district. Available slots are announced annually by grade. The Dwight Morrow choice program has been the state's largest.

== History ==
In 2009, Cleveland School was renamed in memory of the district's first African-American principal, Dr. Leroy McCloud, who had a 50-year career in the school district.

In 2013, the Englewood Cliffs district announced plans to consider ending the sending relationship by creating its own high school, possibly in conjunction with the Englewood Cliffs campus of Saint Peter's University.

The district had been classified by the New Jersey Department of Education as being in District Factor Group "DE", the fifth-highest of eight groupings. District Factor Groups organize districts statewide to allow comparison by common socioeconomic characteristics of the local districts. From lowest socioeconomic status to highest, the categories are A, B, CD, DE, FG, GH, I and J.

== Schools ==
Schools in the district (with 2023–24 enrollment data from the National Center for Education Statistics) are:

Preschool

- D. A. Quarles Early Childhood Center with 431 students in grades PreK–K
  - Arlene Ng, principal

Elementary schools

- Dr. John Grieco Elementary School with 353 students in grades 1–2
  - Lamarr Thomas, principal
- Dr. Leroy McCloud School with 481 students in grades 3–5
  - Joe Armental, principal

Middle school

- Janis E. Dismus Middle School with 525 students in grades 6–8
  - Lamarr Thomas, principal

High school

- Dwight Morrow High School / Academies @ Englewood with 1,078 students in grades 9–12
  - Jorge Osoria, principal

== Administration ==
Core members of the district's administration are:

- Marnie Hazelton, superintendent
- Michael Steinmetz, business administrator and board secretary

Ronel Cook, who had taken office as superintendent for the 2022-23 school year, was killed in a car crash in November 2022.

The district's offices are in the Administration Building at the Russell C. Major Liberty School.

== Board of education ==
The district's board of education, comprised of nine members, sets policy and oversees the fiscal and educational operation of the district through its administration. As a Type II school district, the board's trustees are elected directly by voters to serve three-year terms of office on a staggered basis, with three seats up for election each year held (since 2014) as part of the November general election. The board appoints a superintendent to oversee the district's day-to-day operations and a business administrator to supervise the business functions of the district.

== Academic performance ==
As of 2017 the district's averages in the Partnership for Assessment of Readiness for College and Careers (PARCC) examinations were below the averages of the State of New Jersey and of Bergen County as a whole.
