= Janet Jacobs =

American baseball player (1928–2017)

- Shortstop / Center fielder
- Born: October 31, 1928; Englewood, New Jersey, U.S.
- Died: January 18, 2017 (aged 88)
- Batted: Both Threw: Right

Teams
- Racine Belles (1945)

Career highlights and awards
- Women in Baseball – AAGPBL Permanent Display at the Baseball Hall of Fame and Museum (since 1988)

Janet Jacobs (October 31, 1928 – January 18, 2017) was an American baseball player. A shortstop and center fielder, she played in the All-American Girls Professional Baseball League (AAGPBL) during its 1945 season. Listed at 5' 4", 120 lb., Jacobs was a switch hitter who threw right handed. She was dubbed Jay Jay by her teammates.

Born in Englewood, New Jersey, Jacobs attended Dwight Morrow High School. She played on the school's varsity baseball team but was forced to quit after a few games after being told by the principal that it was not the way a young lady should act.

Jacobs spent a season with the Racine Belles club before going on to college. She posted a batting average of .170 (17-for-100) in 38 game appearances, driving in seven runs and scoring six times, while hitting two homers with eight stolen bases.

Afterwards, Jacobs switched to swimming and earned a bachelor's degree in chemistry from the Purdue University in West Lafayette, Indiana. She then married and raised a family of four children.

In her spare time, Janet played tennis and competed in the Senior Platform Tennis Championships in the 1980s. She later moved to Franklin Lakes, New Jersey.

The All-American Girls Professional Baseball League folded in 1954, but there is now a permanent display at the Baseball Hall of Fame and Museum at Cooperstown, New York, since November 5, 1988, that honors those who were part of this unique experience. Janet, along with the rest of the girls and the league staff, is included at the display/exhibit.

Jacobs died on January 18, 2017, at the age of 88.
