= Jimmie Jones (defensive end) =

American football player (born 1947)

No. 65, 82
- Position: Defensive end

Personal information
- Born: January 17, 1947 (age 79); Columbia, South Carolina, U.S.
- Listed height: 6 ft 5 in (1.96 m)
- Listed weight: 220 lb (100 kg)

Career information
- High school: Englewood (NJ) Dwight Morrow
- College: Wichita State
- NFL draft: 1969: 6th round, 156th overall pick

Career history
- New York Jets (1969–1970); Washington Redskins (1971–1973)
- Stats at Pro Football Reference

Jimmie Harold Jones (born January 17, 1947) is an American former professional football defensive end in the National Football League (NFL) for the New York Jets and Washington Redskins. He played college football at Wichita State University and was selected in the sixth round of the 1969 NFL/AFL draft.

A native of Englewood, New Jersey, Jones attended Dwight Morrow High School.
