= Wayne A. Cauthen =

American politician (born 1955)

Wayne Cauthen

City Manager of Kansas City, Missouri
- In office April 2003 – November 19, 2009

Personal details
- Born: September 5, 1955 (age 70) Lancaster, South Carolina, U.S.
- Education: Central State University (BA); University of Colorado (MA)

Wayne A. Cauthen (born September 5, 1955) is an American politician who served as the first appointed African-American City Manager of Kansas City, Missouri. Prior to his appointment, Cauthen served as the Chief of Staff for Denver Mayor, Wellington Webb.

== Early life and education ==
Cauthen was born on September 5, 1955, in Lancaster, South Carolina. He grew up in Englewood, New Jersey, and graduated in 1974 from Dwight Morrow High School. He graduated cum laude from Central State University in Wilberforce, Ohio, and attended graduate school at the University of Colorado.

== Career ==
Cauthen began his career in public service with intern positions for the Ohio General Assembly and the city manager of Xenia, Ohio. Cauthen then relocated to Denver, where he was an administrator for the Space Launch Systems programs at Martin Marietta. In that position, he was responsible for the Small Business Development program for the Space Launch Systems Division. This division was responsible for the Titan missile project.

Cauthen later served as chief of staff to Mayor Wellington Webb from March 1997 to March 2003. Cauthen also served as Webb's deputy chief of staff from March 1997 through January 2000 and director of the Mayor's Office of Contract Compliance from January 1993 to February 1997. As chief of staff in Denver, Cauthen managed nine cabinet-level departments, including Aviation, Public Works, and Parks and Recreation; and 11 agencies such as the Clerk and Recorder, the Budget and Management Office, and Planning and Community Development. Cauthen also worked for the State of Colorado Capital Complex Divisions and the Colorado Minority Business Development Agency.

Cauthen was appointed city manager of Kansas City, Missouri, in April 2003. On November 19, 2009, Cauthen was suspended as city manager by the Kansas City city council by a vote of 7–6.
