= Genesis HealthCare =

Provider of short-term post-acute, skilled nursing and long-term care services

- Type: Public
- Traded as: Expert Market: GENN
- Industry: Health care
- Founded: 2003; 22 years
- Founder: Michael R. Walker
- Headquarters: Kennett Square, Pennsylvania, U.S.
- Key people: George V. Hager, Jr. (CEO)
- Revenue: $5.7 Billion USD (2016)
- Number of employees: 68,700 (2017)
- Website: www.genesishcc.com

Genesis HealthCare provides short-term post-acute, rehabilitation, skilled nursing and long-term care services. According to data provided by the Centers for Medicare & Medicaid, as of November 1, 2023, Genesis owned or operated 290 skilled nursing facilities with 34,047 beds through 105 affiliates in 25 states in the United States. Genesis also supplies rehabilitation therapy to approximately 1,700 healthcare providers in 45 states and the District of Columbia. The company is headquartered in Kennett Square, Pennsylvania.

== History ==
=== 20th century ===
Genesis Health Ventures was founded by Michael R. Walker and Richard R. Howard in 1985, with the acquisition of nine centers. Between 1985 and 1998, Genesis Health Ventures grew from a $32 million to a $2.4 billion public company through the acquisition of nursing homes and services, including rehabilitation therapy, diagnostic testing, respiratory therapy, and pharmacy companies.

=== 21st century ===
Genesis Health Ventures filed for Chapter 11 bankruptcy the following year, in 2000. In 2001, the company reorganized and reemerged from bankruptcy. Walker stepped down as CEO in 2002, a role he held since 1985.

In 2003, Genesis Health Ventures separated the company's in-patient care and pharmacy divisions. As part of the separation, Genesis Health Ventures adopted NeighborCare pharmacy division's trade name, and spun off the company's Genesis ElderCare Skilled Nursing Centers and Assisted Living and Independent Living Communities, as well as Genesis Rehabilitation Therapy Services, into a new entity – Genesis HealthCare Corporation.

NeighborCare, which traded on NASDAQ as NCRX, was acquired by Omnicare in 2005.

On July 13, 2007, Formation Capital and JER Partners completed the acquisition of Genesis HealthCare Corporation. The total enterprise value of the transaction was approximately $1.52 billion. Genesis' shareholders received $69.35 in cash for each share of Genesis' common stock that they held.

=== St. Joseph's Center evacuations and bankruptcy ===
On March 5, 2025, St. Joseph's Center, a medical nursing home complex located in Trumbull, Connecticut and owned and operated by Genesis Healthcare, experienced major water damage after officials found Legionella bacteria in the building. 187 occupants who were in the building at the time were evacuated and moved to other nursing homes across the state.

On May 16, 2025, 107 occupants in the building were evacuated after management found fire safety issues described as "serious deficiencies that present conditions classified as Immediately Dangerous to Life and Health." This meant that the building was unsafe to be occupied until the issues were resolved. On May 29, 2025, just short of two weeks after the previous incident, Genesis Healthcare announced that they would be permanently closing St. Joseph's Center once they get necessary approvals from the state. Genesis Healthcare officials noted that despite the building did receive necessary structural repairs to maintain safety to its remaining patients, they could not get waivers for additional repairs and structural improvements still lingering around the building. However, CT Governor Ned Lamont claimed that what Genesis Healthcare had stated had "absolutely nothing to do" with the closure, instead blaming the company for submitting an improper closure request with the United States Department of Health and Human Services, asking Genesis Healthcare to resubmit another closure request. Trumbull First Selectman Vicki Tesoro announced that she would be working with Genesis Healthcare and the Roman Catholic Diocese of Bridgeport on possible future usage of the property. The closure date was set for August 9, 2025, which will result in the layoff of 180 workers, including 70 nurses, plus the loss of 269 beds. Lamont additionally accused Genesis Healthcare of failing to maintain safety of its patients and employees after St. Joseph's Center had previously failed several safety inspections prior to the closure.

On July 9, 2025, Genesis Healthcare and all of its affiliated subsidiaries filed for Chapter 11 bankruptcy protection in the United States District Court for the Northern District of Texas, listing assets and liabilities between $1 billion to $10 billion. The company has secured $30 million in debtor-in-possession financing from its lenders as part of the bankruptcy proceedings. The company blamed its bankruptcy on being unable to pay for legal costs and rising wrongful-death lawsuits, as well as mass losses in revenue as a result from expanding too quickly, having over 500 properties by 2016.

Prior to its July 9 bankruptcy filing, the company had warned of a potential bankruptcy twice, in 2017 and 2020. In November 2017, the company warned that it could be forced into Chapter 11 bankruptcy protection if it was unable to gain relief from its creditors, as it stated that it would most likely not be able to gain cash flow to continue maintaining its operations. The company's stock ended up falling to 87 cents per share after the announcement. Then, on August 11, 2020, Genesis Healthcare once again warned that it could file for Chapter 11 bankruptcy as it faced "substantial doubt" that it would be able to properly continue its operations as a result from the effects of the COVID-19 pandemic, which ended up causing significant losses for the company throughout Q2 2020, and occupancy at its locations fell to 77%. The company claimed that while the Trump administration provided them resources throughout the pandemic, it ultimately was not enough for them to address necessary funding needed for those affected by the pandemic. On March 3, 2021, Genesis Healthcare announced a voluntary restructuring of its operations and would be delisted from the New York Stock Exchange. During this restructuring plan, the company made efforts to eliminate $326 million of its debt, as well as improving financial metrics and eliminating the leases of 51 of its facilities, selling those leases to new operators.

On July 10, 2025, ReGen Healthcare made a stalking horse bid to acquire all of Genesis Healthcare's assets for an undisclosed amount.

== Mergers & acquisitions ==
On April 1, 2011, Health Care REIT, Inc., now Welltower, completed a $2.4 billion acquisition of substantially all of the real estate assets of privately owned Genesis HealthCare, which was previously announced on February 28, 2011. In June 2012, Genesis HealthCare announced plans to acquire Sun Healthcare Group.

On December 1, 2012, Genesis completed the acquisition of Sun Healthcare Group, Inc. (NASDAQ GS: SUNH), which was headquartered in Irvine, California and operated skilled nursing facilities, assisted and independent living centers, and behavior health centers in 23 states. Sun also owned SunDance Rehabilitation, CareerStaff Unlimited and SolAmor Hospice. Genesis acquired Sun for $8.50 per share. The aggregate amount of the merger was approximately $215, excluding closing costs and the repayment of Sun debts.

In February 2015, Genesis Healthcare merged with California-based Skilled Healthcare Group, Inc. The combined company operated more than 400 skilled nursing and assisted and senior living communities in 34 states and more than 1,800 rehabilitation therapy sites in 47 states. The company changed its ticker from (NYSE: SKH) to (NYSE: GEN).

In June 2015, Genesis HealthCare acquired 24 skilled nursing facilities from Revera.

The company acquired ProMedica in 2023.

== Locations ==
Genesis operates approximately 450 Skilled Nursing Facilities and Assisted/Senior Living Communities across the nation located in 30 states. Additionally, Genesis Rehab Services provide therapy to approximately 1,700 locations across 45 states.
