= Dwight Morrow High School =

High school in Bergen County, New Jersey, US

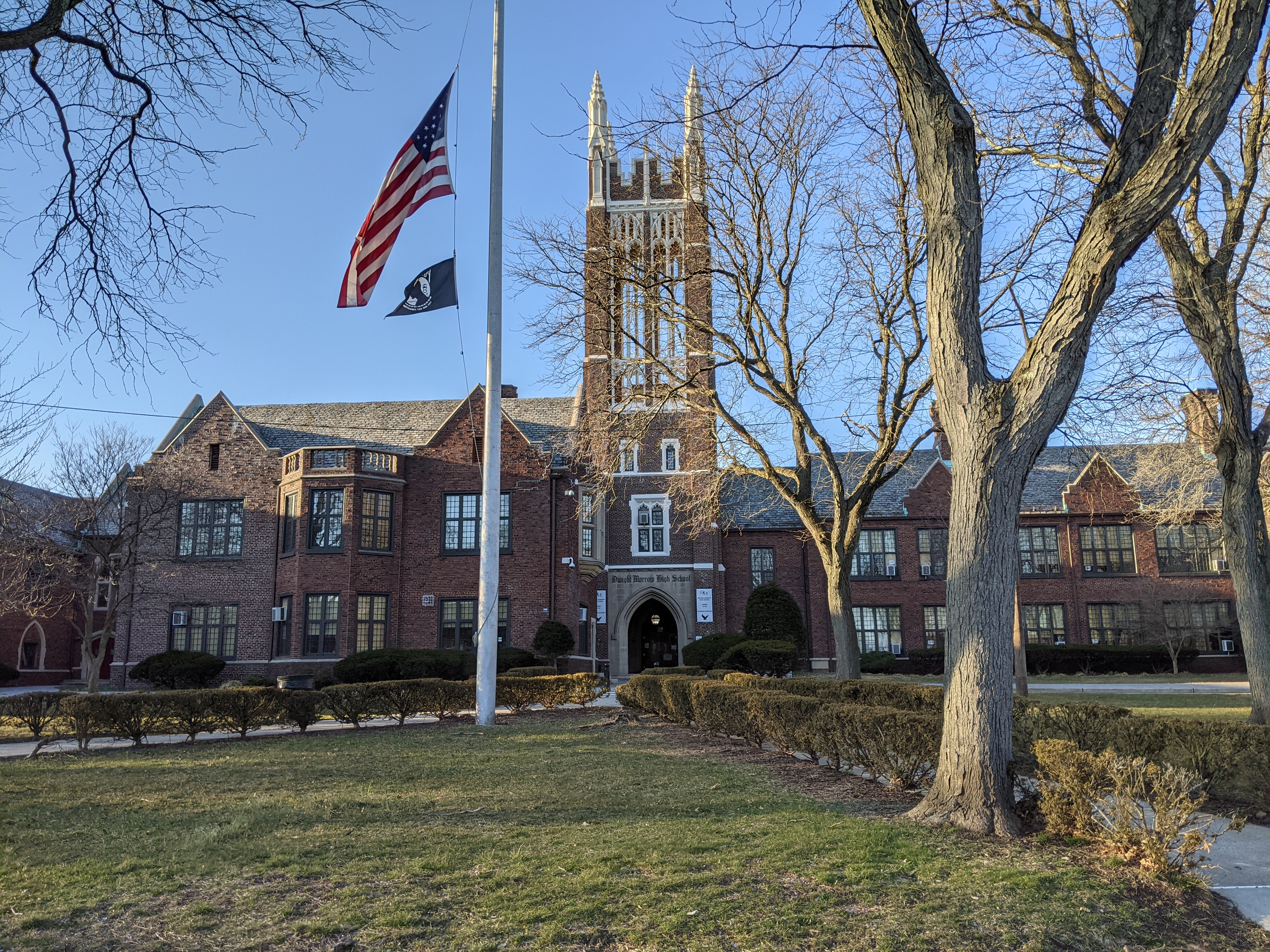

Location
- 274 Knickerbocker Road; Englewood, Bergen County, New Jersey 07631; United States; 40.908126°N 73.980656°W

Information
- Type: Public high school
- Established: January 1933
- School district: Englewood Public School District
- NCES School ID: 340474000388
- Principal: Joseph Armental
- Faculty: 81.6 FTEs
- Enrollment: 1,083 (as of 2024–25)
- Student to teacher ratio: 13.3:1
- Campus: Suburban
- Colors: Maroon and white
- Athletics conference: Big North Conference (general); North Jersey Super Football Conference (football)
- Team name: Maroon Raiders
- Newspaper: Maroon Tribune
- Yearbook: Engle Log
- Website: www.epsd.org/o/dmhs

Dwight Morrow High School is a four-year comprehensive public high school located in Englewood, in Bergen County, in the U.S. state of New Jersey, operating as part of the Englewood Public School District. The school also serves students from Englewood Cliffs, who attend as part of a sending/receiving relationship. Dwight Morrow high school shares its campus with the Academies at Englewood.

As of the 2024–25 school year, the school had an enrollment of 1,083 students and 81.6 classroom teachers (on an FTE basis), for a student–teacher ratio of 13.3:1. There were 631 students (58.3% of enrollment) eligible for free lunch and 94 (8.7% of students) eligible for reduced-cost lunch.

The Academies at Englewood is a four-year magnet high school established in 2002 that serves students in the ninth through twelfth grades from across Bergen County and shares the campus with Dwight Morrow. The program was started by John Grieco (founder of the Bergen County Academies) who was brought in as district superintendent in an effort to diversify the student body at Dwight Morrow High School by attracting "more white and Asian students to the high school" from outside the Englewood community to an academically challenging, high-performing magnet program that was modeled after his Bergen County Academies, with students being admitted on a competitive basis and half coming from outside of the city.

== History ==
Located on a 37-acre (15 ha) park-like campus and constructed at a cost of $750,000 (equivalent to $8.7 million in 2025) from a design by architect Lawrence C. Licht, the school was opened to students in January 1933 with a capacity of 1,200 students, helping to ease overcrowding at the existing high school and junior high facilities.

The school is named after Dwight Morrow, a businessman, politician, and diplomat who lived in the city. The school shares its campus with the Academies at Englewood and Janis E. Dismus Middle School. Dwight Morrow and the Academies at Englewood are located east of Miller's Pond and share the same administration. Janis E. Dismus Middle School, formerly Englewood Middle School, is located south of Miller's Pond and operates independently.

The school had been accredited by the Middle States Association of Colleges and Schools from 1928 until 2012, when the school's accreditation status was removed.

=== Demographic issues ===
During the 1980s, the school's racial and ethnic makeup saw significant changes; school enrollment was 36% white in the late 1970s, many of them students from Englewood Cliffs, but the number of white students declined significantly during the 1980s, leaving a student body that was 92% African American or Hispanic by 1995. Levels of violence grew at the school and academic performance declined; "There were more violent incidents reported at DMHS (Dwight Morrow High School) than any other school in Bergen County in the 1991–92 school year, and test scores remained painfully low."

The Englewood Cliffs Public Schools cited poor performance at Dwight Morrow as justification for its efforts to end the sending / receiving relationship with Englewood that had existed since 1965 and began sending students from Englewood Cliffs to Tenafly High School, a high-performing school whose student body was predominantly white. This led to a protracted court battle between Englewood and Englewood Cliffs beginning in 1985, a move characterized by Englewood residents as racist. Court battles continued, in an attempt to desegregate the high school.

According to Assemblyman John E. Rooney, "white students from Englewood Cliffs, the district trying to end its obligation to send its students to Dwight Morrow, feared for their safety at the heavily minority institution." Most Englewood Cliffs parents have chosen private school over Dwight Morrow High School.

The Academies magnet program was opened up in an attempt to attract "white and Asian students back into Englewood's schools". The opening of the new academy led to a perception by Englewood's African American community that the academy and its diverse student body was given its own portion of the campus to operate on with highly qualified teachers and more resources, while the "overwhelmingly black and Hispanic" regular high school, Dwight Morrow, continued to operate separately on the campus with overcrowded classrooms and an inferior education. Dwight Morrow students walked out and staged a rally in September 2005 to protest against the conditions at the school: "The books are old and the classes are overcrowded,' said..., a junior. "In my history class at least five students have to stand up each day."

In the pages of The Record, columnist Lawrence Aaron contrasted the Academies at Englewood, with its "longer school day, rigorous and engaging core academic curriculum, technology, upgraded classroom materials and equipment not available to Dwight Morrow students, climate reflecting high expectations, inviting classrooms", while Dwight Morrow had a "lack of classroom equipment and technology, in many classes students are either not engaged at all or are engaged in below grade-level assignments".

Residents of Englewood felt that the district has worked against the progress of the high school by opening up the Academies; with greater resources devoted to the Academies, some residents felt that Dwight Morrow had been neglected. About 50% of the students are from outside of Englewood. Members of Englewood's African American community said that the city and the board of education has put its minority residents second with the move. "For the past three years they've been feeling like second-class citizens in their own town, sharing a campus with another high school touted as academically superior, and getting no respect... The message to kids and parents at that 97 percent African-American and Hispanic high school is that for so-called integration to happen on the campus, you must swallow the bitter pill that tastes like apartheid."

=== Architecture ===
Dwight Morrow High School has two buildings; the North building was the original structure of the school and the South building, used for the Academies at Englewood, was constructed in the 1960s. The high school's North building, with its a 100-foot (30 m) tower, was completed in 1932 and was constructed using the Collegiate Gothic architectural style. The campus also shares the office of the board of education and the superintendent.

Millers Pond and Janis E. Dismus Middle School are all part of the school campus.

== Athletics ==
The Dwight Morrow High School Maroon Raiders compete in the Big North Conference, which is composed of public and private high schools in Bergen and Passaic counties, and was established following a reorganization of sports leagues in Northern New Jersey by the New Jersey State Interscholastic Athletic Association (NJSIAA). The school had previously participated in the BCSL American athletic conference of the Bergen County Scholastic League. With 816 students in grades 10–12, the school was classified by the NJSIAA for the 2019–20 school year as Group III for most athletic competition purposes, which included schools with an enrollment of 761 to 1,058 students in that grade range. The football team competes in the Ivy White division of the North Jersey Super Football Conference, which includes 112 schools competing in 20 divisions. The football team is one of the 12 programs assigned to the two Ivy divisions starting in 2020, which are intended to allow weaker programs ineligible for playoff participation to compete primarily against each other. The school was classified by the NJSIAA as Group III North for football for 2024–2026, which included schools with 700 to 884 students.

The boys basketball team won the Group III state championship in 1947 (against Springfield Regional—since renamed as Jonathan Dayton High School —in the finals), 1951 (vs. Woodrow Wilson High School), 1960 (vs. Moorestown High School) and 1961 (vs. Burlington Township High School), and won the Group II title in 1975 (vs. Pleasantville High School). Led by 24 points from Sherman White, the 1947 team pulled away to defeat Springfield Regional by a score of 49–22 in the championship game at the Elizabeth Armory to win the Group III state title and run their record for the season to 25–0. The 1951 team finished the season with a record of 23–1 after winning the Group III title with a 59–34 win against Woodrow Wilson in the championship game. The 1975 team, led by future NBA player Bill Willoughby who was named to the all-tournament team, defeated defending champion Pleasantville by a score of 70–66 in the championship game to win the Group II title and finish the season with a mark of 27–2. The team won the 2008 North I, Group II state sectional title, defeating Pascack Hills High School 72–65 in the tournament final. The win marked the team's first sectional title since 2005, ending a two-year run by Pascack Hills.

The boys track team won the spring / outdoor track state championship in Group III in 1965 (as co-champion) and in Group II in 1992.

The boys track team won the Group III indoor relay championships in 1970 and 1971.

== Administration ==
Joseph Armental is the school's principal. His administration team includes the vice principal.

== Notable alumni ==
- John Aprea (1941–2024, class of 1959) actor who played young Salvatore Tessio in The Godfather Part II and appeared on Another World
- John William Atkinson (1923–2003), psychologist who pioneered the scientific study of human motivation, achievement and behavior
- John Manley Barnett (1917–2013), orchestral conductor and musician
- Bernard Belle (1964–2022), writer
- Regina Belle (born 1963, class of 1981), singer
- Arnold E. Brown (born 1932), politician who became the first African American elected to represent Bergen County in the New Jersey Legislature, when was elected in 1965 to serve in the New Jersey General Assembly
- John F. Callinan (1935–2025), judge of the New Jersey Superior Court
- Darnell Carter (born 1987, class of 2006), former Arena Football League linebacker
- Wayne A. Cauthen (born 1955, class of 1974), City Manager of Kansas City, Missouri
- David X. Cohen (born 1966, class of 1984), writer
- Peter Coyote (born 1941, class of 1959), actor, director, screenwriter, author and narrator of films, theater, television and audiobooks
- William Deresiewicz (born 1964, class of 1981), author, essayist and literary critic
- Ronald Enroth (1938–2023), professor of sociology
- Lew Erber (1934–1990), American football coach who was offensive coordinator for the New England Patriots
- David Feldman, comedy writer
- Bruce Harper (born 1955, class of 1973), former NFL running back who played for the New York Jets
- Chris Hewitt (born 1974), former American football safety who has been a coach for the Baltimore Ravens
- Doug Howard (born 1956), musician
- Ernie Isley (born 1952, class of 1970), lead guitarist for the Isley Brothers
- Marvin Isley (1953–2010, class of 1972), bass guitarist for the Isley Brothers
- Janet Jacobs (1928–2017), shortstop and center fielder who played in the All-American Girls Professional Baseball League
- Roberta S. Jacobson (born 1960), diplomat
- Jimmie Jones (born 1947), former American football defensive end who played in the NFL for the New York Jets and the Washington Redskins
- Jon Leibowitz (born 1958, class of 1976), attorney who served as chairman of the Federal Trade Commission from 2009 to 2013
- Robert Levithan (1951–2016, class of 1969), writer and HIV/AIDS activist
- Richard Lewis (1947–2024, class of 1965), comedian and actor who appeared as a regular on Curb Your Enthusiasm
- Christina McHale (born 1992), professional tennis player
- Rick Overton (born 1954, class of 1972), comedian and actor
- Sarah Jessica Parker (born 1965), actress
- Freddie Perren (1943–2004, class of 1961), songwriter and record producer
- Clarke Peters (born 1952, class of 1970), actor who played Detective Lester Freamon in the HBO series The Wire
- Keith Reddin (born 1956, class of 1974), playwright and actor
- Owen Renfroe, director
- Tracey Ross (born 1959, class of 1977), actress
- Richie Scheinblum (1942–2021, class of 1960), baseball player
- Wally Schirra (1923–2007, class of 1940) NASA astronaut
- Sister Souljah, activist and writer
- Slam Stewart (1914–1987), upright bass player for Charlie Parker, Art Tatum and Slim Gillard
- Lou Tepe (born 1930, class of 1948), offensive lineman who played for three seasons with the Pittsburgh Steelers
- Elizabeth Thompson (1954–2023), painter
- Tony Tolbert (born 1967), former NFL defensive end who played for the Dallas Cowboys
- David Townsend (1954–2005, class of 1972), musician who played guitar with The Isley Brothers and formed the band Surface
- Joey Travolta (born 1950, class of 1969), actor
- John Travolta (born 1954), actor
- Austin Volk (1919–2010, class of 1937), former mayor of Englewood and two-term member of the New Jersey General Assembly
- Gregor Weiss (born 1941), artistic gymnast who represented the United States at the 1964 Summer Olympics, placing 7th in the team event
- Sherman White (1928–2011, class of 1947), college basketball player who was indicted in the New York City Colleges Point Shaving Scandal of 1951
- Bill Willoughby (born 1957, class of 1975), former NBA Player who was one the first two high school players drafted by the NBA
- John Winkin (1919–2014), baseball coach at Dwight Morrow, scout, broadcaster, journalist and collegiate athletics administrator who led the University of Maine Black Bears baseball team to six College World Series berths
- John T. Wright (c. 1926–1976), politician who in 1952 became the first African-American Councilman elected in Bergen County
- Tom Wright (born 1952, class of 1970), actor who appeared in Weekend at Bernie's II and The Brother from Another Planet
- Elias Zurita (born 1964), retired soccer forward who played professionally in the Major Indoor Soccer League
- Andrew Zwicker (born 1964, class of 1982), physicist, science educator and member of the New Jersey Senate

== Popular culture ==
- The High School's North building is featured as outside scenery for the show Sabrina, the Teenage Witch.
- Dwight Morrow High School was used in the filming of the Sidney Lumet film Running on Empty starring River Phoenix, Judd Hirsch and Christine Lahti.
- Dwight Morrow was featured in the film Gracie.
