= Health discography =

The discography of American noise rock/industrial band Health consists of six main albums, as well as the Disco series of collaborative and remix albums.

== Albums ==
=== Studio albums ===
Title	Details	Peak chart positions			
Title	Details	US Alt.	US Current	US Heat	US Indie
Health	Released: September 18, 2007; Label: Lovepump United	—	—	—	—
Get Color	Released: September 8, 2009; Label: Lovepump United	—	—	17	43
Death Magic	Released: August 7, 2015; Label: Loma Vista	—	24	5	—
Vol. 4: Slaves of Fear	Released: February 8, 2019; Label: Loma Vista	93	—	6	—
Rat Wars	Released: December 7, 2023; Label: Loma Vista	—	—	—	—
Conflict DLC	Released: December 11, 2025; Label: Loma Vista	—	—	—	—
"—" denotes releases that did not chart

=== Remix and collaborative albums ===
Title	Details	Peak chart positions
Title	Details	US Dance
Health//Disco	Released: May 27, 2008; Label: Lovepump United	—
Health::Disco2	Released: June 22, 2010; Label: Lovepump United	22
Disco3	Released: February 17, 2017; Label: Loma Vista	—
Disco3+	Released: June 16, 2017; Label: Loma Vista	—
Disco4: Part I	Released: October 16, 2020; Label: Loma Vista	—
Disco4+	Released: April 2, 2021; Label: None (Self-released)	—
Disco4: Part II	Released: April 8, 2022; Label: Loma Vista	—
R-Type I	Released: February 26, 2026; Label: Loma Vista	—
R-Type II	Released: March 12, 2026; Label: Loma Vista	—
R-Type III	Released: March 26, 2026; Label: Loma Vista	—
R-Type IV	Released: April 9, 2026; Label: Loma Vista	—
R-Type V	Released: April 23, 2026; Label: Loma Vista	—

== Extended plays ==
Title	Details
Elphaba / HEALTH Split 7"	Released: October 27, 2005; Label: Rome Plow
Dimensions in Noise 00001	Released: September 8, 2009; Label: Rough Trade
Addendum	Released: April 30, 2026; Label: Loma Vista

== Singles ==
Title	Year	Peak chart positions					Album	Ref.
Title	Year	US Dance Dig.	US Dance Sales	US Hard Rock	US Hard Rock Dig.	UK Indie	Album	Ref.
"Crimewave" (Crystal Castles vs. Health)	2007	—	—	—	—	9	Health//Disco	
"Perfect Skin"	2008	—	—	—	—	—	Health	
"Heaven"	2008	—	—	—	—	—	Health	
"Triceratops" / "Lost Time"	2008	—	—	—	—	—	Health	
"/ / M \ \"	2008	—	—	—	—	—	Health	
"Die Slow"	2009	—	9	—	—	—	Get Color	
"USA Boys"	2010	—	—	—	—	—	Health::Disco2	
"Tears"	2012	—	—	—	—	—	Max Payne 3 Official Soundtrack	
"Men Today"	2015	—	—	—	—	—	Death Magic	
"New Coke"	2015	—	—	—	—	—	Death Magic	
"Stonefist"	2015	—	—	—	—	—	Death Magic	
"Life"	2015	—	—	—	—	—	Death Magic	
"Crusher"	2016	—	—	—	—	—	Disco3	
"Blue Monday"	2017	22	—	—	—	—	Atomic Blonde	
"Hard to Be a God" (with Nolife)	2017	—	—	—	—	—	Disco4: Part I	
"Mass Grave" (with Soccer Mommy)	2018	—	—	—	—	—	Disco4: Part I	
"Body/Prison" (with Perturbator)	2018	—	—	—	—	—	Disco4: Part I	
"Innocence" (with Youth Code)	2018	—	—	—	—	—	Disco4: Part I	
"Hate You" (with JPEGMafia)	2019	—	—	—	—	—	Disco4: Part I	
"Judgement Night" (with Ghostemane)	2019	—	—	—	—	—	Disco4: Part I	
"Delicious Ape" (with Xiu Xiu)	2019	—	—	—	—	—	Disco4: Part I	
"Full of Health" (with Full of Hell)	2020	—	—	—	—	—	Disco4: Part I	
"Cyberpunk 2.0.2.0"	2020	—	—	—	—	—	Disco4: Part I	
"Isn't Everyone" (with Nine Inch Nails)	2021	—	—	11	—	—	Disco4: Part II	
"Anti-Life" (with Tyler Bates and Chino Moreno)	2021	—	—	—	—	—	Dark Nights: Death Metal soundtrack	
"Dead Flowers" (with Poppy)	2021	—	—	—	—	—	Disco4: Part II	
"Cold Blood" (with Lamb of God)	2022	—	—	—	—	—	Disco4: Part II	
"Hateful"	2023	—	—	—	—	—	Rat Wars	
"Children of Sorrow"	2023	—	—	—	—	—	Rat Wars	
"Ashamed"	2023	—	—	—	—	—	Rat Wars	
"Unloved"	2023	—	—	—	—	—	Rat Wars	
"Demigods"	2023	—	—	—	—	—	Rat Wars	
"The Drain" (with Bad Omens and Swarm)	2024	—	—	7	6	—	Concrete Jungle (The OST); Rat Wars Ultra Edition; Addendum	
"Mean" (with Chelsea Wolfe)	2025	—	—	—	—	—	Addendum	
"Ordinary Loss"	2025	—	—	—	—	—	Conflict DLC	
"Vibe Cop"	2025	—	—	—	—	—	Conflict DLC	
"Thought Leader"	2025	—	—	—	—	—	Conflict DLC	
"You Died"	2025	—	—	—	—	—	Conflict DLC	
"Shred Envy"	2025	—	—	—	—	—	Conflict DLC	
"Antidote"	2025	—	—	—	—	—	Conflict DLC	
"A.L.O.N.E."	2026	—	—	—	—	—	Addendum	

== Music videos ==
Title	Year	Director(s)
"Die Slow"	2009	John Famiglietti
"We Are Water"	2010	Eric Wareheim
"USA Boys"	2010	John Famiglietti
"Tears"	2012	David Altobelli, Jeff Desom
"New Coke"	2015	John Famiglietti
"Stonefist"	2015	Naked Faces
"L.A. Looks"	2016	Derrick Beckles
"Euphoria"	2017	John Famiglietti / James Kid
"Life"	2018	Jason DeMarco
"Ashamed (of Being Born)"	2023	John Famiglietti / James Kid
"Children of Sorrow"	2024	John Famiglietti / James Kid
"Don't Try"	2024	rose-engine
"Ashamed" (version with Lauren Mayberry)	2024	Mynxii White
"Crack Metal"	2024	Samuel Halleen

== Soundtracks ==
- 2010 – Wasted on the Young – "Die Slow"
- 2012 – Max Payne 3 Official Soundtrack – All tracks
- 2013 – Grand Theft Auto V – "High Pressure Dave"
- 2015 – Need For Speed – "New Coke"
- 2017 – Atomic Blonde – "Blue Monday" (New Order cover)
- 2019 – Grand Theft Auto Online: Arena War (Official Soundtrack) – All tracks
- 2019 – 13 Reasons Why (Season 3) – "Slaves of Fear"
- 2020 - Cyberpunk 2077 - "Major Crimes" (credited as "HEALTH & Window Weather")
- 2023 - Ultrakill - "Hateful"
- 2025 - Locked - "Trials"
- 2026 - Street Fighter (Original Motion Picture Soundtrack) - "Negative Edge" and "Brainrot"

== Remixes ==
List of remixes, with year released and original artists shown
Title	Year	Original artist(s)	Album
"Broken Dreams, Inc."	2021	Rise Against	Broken Dreams, Inc. (HEALTH Remix)
"Worst Is On Its Way"	2022	Korn	Worst Is On Its Way (HEALTH Remix) (feat. Danny Brown, Meechy Darko)
"Laid to Rest"	2024	Lamb of God	Ashes of the Wake (20th Anniversary Edition)
"Many Lives"	2026	Purity Ring	Transmutations
