= R-Type (album series) =

2026 remix albums by Health

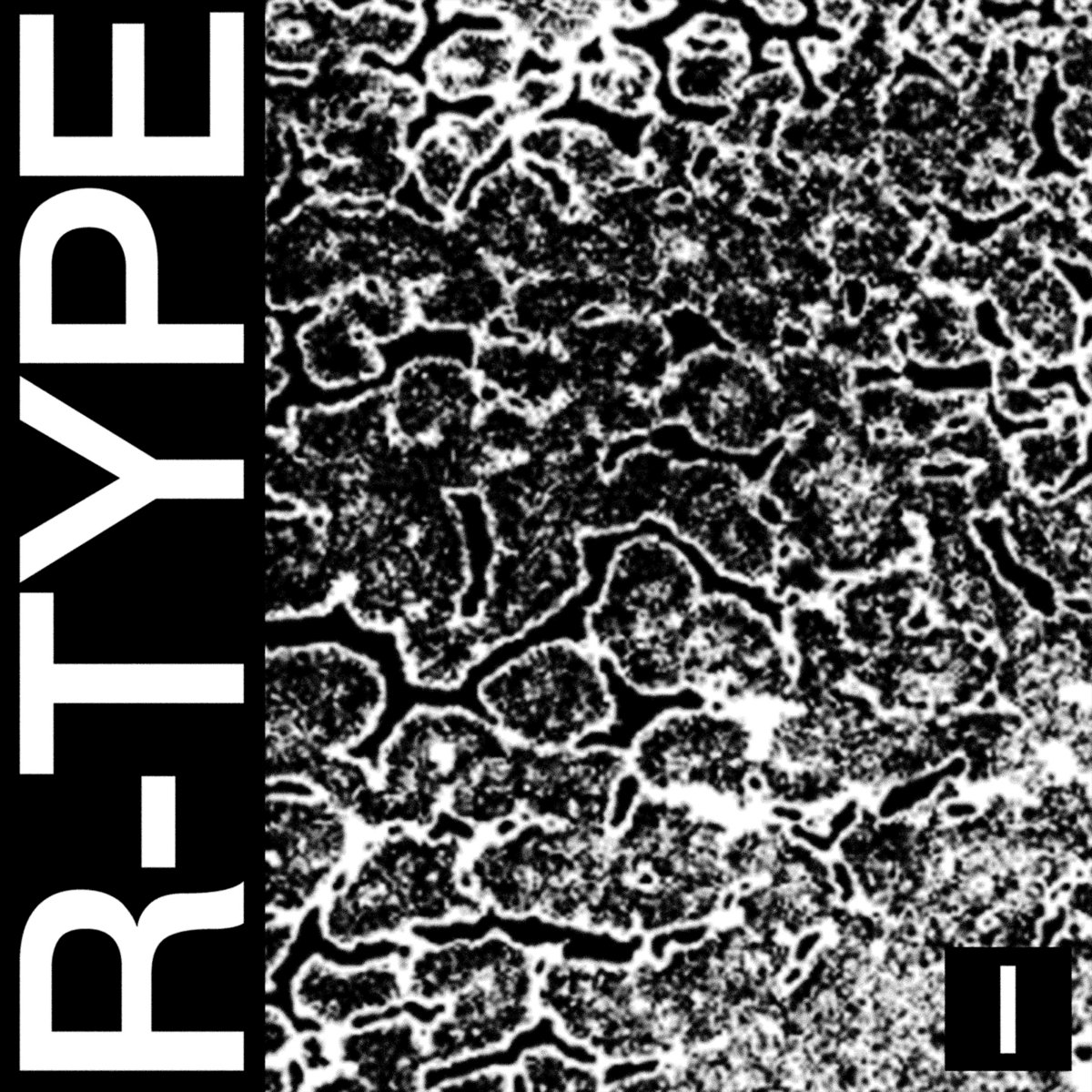
- The album artwork for R-Type I

Remix album series by Health
- Released: February 26, 2026 (I); March 12, 2026 (II); March 26, 2026 (III); April 9, 2026 (IV); April 23, 2026 (V)
- Length: 23:44 (I); 21:35 (II); 21:57 (III); 23:52 (IV); 24:17 (V)
- Label: Loma Vista

Health chronology
Conflict DLC (2025)	R-Type (2026)

R-Type (stylized R-TYPE) is a series of five remix albums by American noise rock band Health.

== Background and release ==
The R-Type series was announced alongside the mainline album Conflict DLC in September 2025. R-Type I was released in February 2026, followed by R-Type II and R-Type III in March. R-Type IV and R-Type V were released in April.

The R-Type series remixes songs from Conflict DLC, Rat Wars, and Disco4: Part II. Bassist John Famigletti compared it to Elden Ring Nightreign, with Conflict DLC being Shadow of the Erdtree and Rat Wars being Elden Ring.

== Track listing ==
=== R-Type I ===
No.	Title	Length
1.	"Ordinary Loss" (Brooks Aleksander remix)	4:53
2.	"You Died" (Hvdes remix)	4:05
3.	"Shred Envy" (Tokyo Rose & Alex remix)	4:05
4.	"Still Breathing (with Ekkstacy)" (Snakes of Russia remix)	4:21
5.	"Don't Kill Yourself (with Street Sex)"	2:51
6.	"Darkage (feat. Mothica)" (1000 Eyes remix)	3:26
Total length:		23:44

=== R-Type II ===
No.	Title	Length
1.	"Antidote (feat. Pixel Grip)" (Amortal remix)	2:55
2.	"Burn the Candles" (Horskh remix)	3:13
3.	"Thought Leader" (Brvmes remix)	3:19
4.	"Ordinary Loss (feat. DeathByRomy)" (Brothel remix)	3:13
5.	"Demigods" (Giirls remix)	4:16
6.	"Excess (with Perturbator)" (goneMUNE remix)	4:37
Total length:		21:35

=== R-Type III ===
No.	Title	Length
1.	"Vibe Cop" (Lil Texas remix)	2:48
2.	"You Died" (Hideouts x Seth remix)	2:57
3.	"Trash Decade" (Hakita remix)	4:22
4.	"Don't Kill Yourself" (Perturbator remix)	4:21
5.	"Shred Envy" (Pictureplane remix)	3:26
6.	"Unloved" (Zetra remix)	4:01
Total length:		21:35

=== R-Type IV ===
No.	Title	Length
1.	"Sicko (feat. Godflesh)" (Belief Defect remix)	6:33
2.	"Unloved" (Cable remix)	3:45
3.	"Antidote (feat. Desire)"	3:14
4.	"Children of Sorrow" (Gost remix)	2:33
5.	"Ashamed (feat. Lauren Mayberry)"	3:02
6.	"Wasted Years" (Magic Sword remix)	4:45
Total length:		23:52

=== R-Type V ===
No.	Title	Length
1.	"Thought Leader" (Purity Ring remix)	3:21
2.	"DSM-V" (Social Kid remix)	3:10
3.	"Hateful (feat. Sierra Veins)" (Matteo Tura remix)	4:19
4.	"Vibe Cop" (Vavn remix)	3:27
5.	"Trash Decade" (Jeff in Leather remix)	3:15
6.	"Torture II" (Paths of the Eternal remix)	6:45
Total length:		24:17

Notes

- All track titles are stylized in all caps.
