= Rat Wars =

Studio album by Health
- Released: December 7, 2023
- Genre: Electro-industrial; industrial metal; EBM
- Length: 41:32
- Label: Loma Vista
- Producer: Stint

Health chronology
Disco4: Part II (2022)	Rat Wars (2023)	Conflict DLC (2025)

Singles from Rat Wars
- 1. "Hateful" Released: April 27, 2023; 2. "Children of Sorrow" Released: October 5, 2023; 3. "Sicko" Released: October 5, 2023; 4. "Ashamed" Released: October 23, 2023; 5. "Unloved" Released: November 16, 2023; 6. "Demigods" Released: November 23, 2023

Rat Wars is the fifth studio album by American noise rock band Health, released on December 7, 2023, through Loma Vista Recordings. It was produced by Stint and received positive reviews from critics.

== Background and recording ==
The album was conceived after the band put together the second Disco4 album remotely. Vocalist and guitarist Jake Duzsik initially considered naming it Outer Dark, after the novel by Cormac McCarthy, but eventually settled on Rat Wars, the title of a track from their previous album Vol. 4: Slaves of Fear; the band compared the situation to The Doors' Waiting for the Sun.

Rat Wars includes the work of a number of guest artists, including synthwave artist Sierra, electronic producer SWARM, Willie Adler of metal band Lamb of God, and members of Youth Code and Street Sects. It was produced by Stint, though for "Children of Sorrow", band member John Famigletti intentionally used the demo mix as he felt it had "more vibe". "Future of Hell" was derived from a track by electronic artist Nexy that Famigletti heard whilst driving; he asked to work with him on the album, but was declined, leading to the track being sampled instead.

== Composition ==
Rat Wars incorporates elements of metal, electronic and industrial genres. It continues in the direction established by Health's previous album Vol. 4: Slaves of Fear, being thematically darker and sonically harsher than the band's previous work.

Duzsik described it as more personal than Health's previous work, being thematically "much more of an ‘I’ record than a ‘we’ record” and influenced by his "disharmonious state". He called the imagery of children in the lyrics "Jungian", being influenced by his own experiences raising his son.

== Promotion and release ==
The first single, "Hateful", was released as part of an April 2023 update to the video game Ultrakill, with the developer stating "Yes, we're premiering... new music inside of Ultrakill now, deal with it". The album was announced alongside two more singles, "Children of Sorrow" and "Sicko", with a release date of December 7. Before the release, the band released three more singles: "Ashamed" on 23 October, "Unloved" on 16 November, and "Demigods" on 23 November.

The cover artwork was designed to mirror that of the band's debut album, as a way of stating they had metaphorically "started again". After its release, the band published a Vampire Survivors-like game on itch.io, Rat Wars Survivors, to promote the album.

In October 2024, the band released Rat Wars Ultra Edition, containing the new single "Free to Die" with Filter, and three previously released tracks. These included a previously Spotify exclusive cover of Deftones' "Be Quiet and Drive (Far Away)", and "The Drain" from Bad Omens' collaborative album Concrete Jungle [The OST]. This material, alongside some new songs, would later be incorporated into an additional Addendum EP released in April 2026.

== Critical reception ==
Professional ratings
Aggregate scores
Source	Rating
Metacritic	73/100
Review scores
Source	Rating
DIY	3/5 stars
Kerrang!	4/5
The Line of Best Fit	8/10
Sputnikmusic	4.9/5
Uncut	5/10

Rat Wars received a score of 73 out of 100 on review aggregator Metacritic based on six critics' reviews, indicating "generally favorable" reception. Olly Thomas of Kerrang! felt that the band "conjure their most effective rendering yet of their distinct aesthetic, a slick night drive through rainy neon-lit streets in search of answers to existential crises". Sputnikmusic's Simon K. called it "a record that's more cinematic, darker, louder, heavier and harder than anything we've heard from them before today", likening the experience of listening to the album on headphones to being "in a confined space with the band lobbing grenades into it". Reviewing the album for The Line of Best Fit, Jack Bray described it as "an album for every conceivable type of Health enjoyer" and found that its "amalgamation of sound" results in "Health arriv[ing] with their most scathing and sombre record yet".

DIY's James Smurthwaite felt that the album "can wash past with as much staying power as candyfloss in a puddle" but its highlights "are reminders of Health at their vibrant and varied best, something that Rat Wars fails to consistently capture". Uncut wrote that while "the music is decent enough", "the problem is Jake Duszik's vocals, which are soft and blank of affect in a way that is oddly characterless. It leaves Rat Wars feeling, if not completely without merit, a bit of an empty vessel".

== Track listing ==
Rat Wars track listing
No.	Title	Writer(s)	Length
1.	"Demigods"	Jacob Duzsik; John Famiglietti; Ajay Bhattacharyya; Brandon Carroll	5:41
2.	"Future of Hell"	Duzsik; Famiglietti; Bhattacharyya; Nexy	2:32
3.	"Hateful" (featuring Sierra)	Duzsik; Famiglietti; Bhattacharyya; Sierra	4:08
4.	"(Of All Else)"	Duzsik; Famiglietti; Bhattacharyya; Sierra	2:30
5.	"Crack Metal"	Duzsik; Famiglietti; Bhattacharyya; Alex Norman	3:10
6.	"Unloved"	Duzsik; Famiglietti; Bhattacharyya	3:16
7.	"Children of Sorrow"	Duzsik; Famiglietti; Will Adler; Bhattacharyya; Carroll	3:20
8.	"Sicko" (featuring Godflesh)	Duzsik; Famiglietti; Bhattacharyya; Justin Broadrick; G. Christian Green	2:21
9.	"Ashamed"	Duzsik; Famiglietti; Bhattacharyya	3:01
10.	"(Of Being Born)"	Duzsik; Famiglietti; Bhattacharyya	1:56
11.	"DSM-V"	Duzsik; Famiglietti; Bhattacharyya; Carroll	4:23
12.	"Don't Try"	Duzsik; Famiglietti; Bhattacharyya	5:14
Total length:			41:32

Rat Wars Ultra Edition - bonus tracks
No.	Title	Writer(s)	Length
13.	"Free to Die" (featuring Filter)	Richard Patrick; Duzsik; Famiglietti; Bhattacharyya	3:41
14.	"Be Quiet and Drive (Far Away)" (cover)	Abe Cunningham; Chi Cheng; Chino Moreno; Stephen Carpenter	3:07
15.	"Ashamed" (featuring Lauren Mayberry)	Duzsik; Famiglietti; Bhattacharyya	3:01
16.	"The Drain" (featuring Bad Omens and Swarm)	Noah Sebastian; Joakim Karlsson; Duzsik; Famiglietti; Bhattacharyya; Swarm	3:45

Sample credits

- "Sicko" contains samples of "Like Rats" by Godflesh.

== Personnel ==
Health

- Jake Duzsik – vocals (all tracks), guitar (1, 4, 7, 10–12), synthesizer (1, 3, 6, 7, 9, 12), keyboards (3), bass guitar (12)
- John Famiglietti – programming (all tracks), synthesizer (1–6, 8–10, 12), bass guitar (1, 3, 4, 7), guitar (3)
- Benjamin Miller – drums (tracks 1, 3–7, 11)

Additional musicians

- Ajay Bhattacharyya – drums, programming (tracks 1–9, 11, 12); guitar (1, 5, 8), synthesizer (2, 5–7, 9, 11, 12), bass guitar (5), keyboards (12)
- Leo Ashline – background vocals (tracks 1, 3, 9)
- SWARM – synthesizer (track 1, 7, 11), guitar (1, 7, 11), bass guitar (11)
- Tyler Bates – guitar (track 1)
- Sara Taylor – background vocals (tracks 2, 5)
- Nexy – programming, synthesizer (track 2)
- Sierra – programming, synthesizer (tracks 3, 4)
- Brutei – bass guitar (track 5)
- Willie Adler – guitar (track 7)
- G. C. Green – bass guitar (track 8) (sampled)
- Justin Broadrick – guitar, vocals (track 8) (sampled)

Technical

- Stint – production
- Ruairi O'Flaherty – mastering
- Lars Stalfors – mixing
- Jason Schimmel – engineering
- Matthew Neighbour – mixing assistance

== Charts ==
Chart performance for Rat Wars
Chart (2023–2024)	Peak position
Scottish Albums (OCC)	39
UK Album Downloads (OCC)	34
UK Rock & Metal Albums (OCC)	4
