= Pictureplane =

American fashion designer and electronic musician

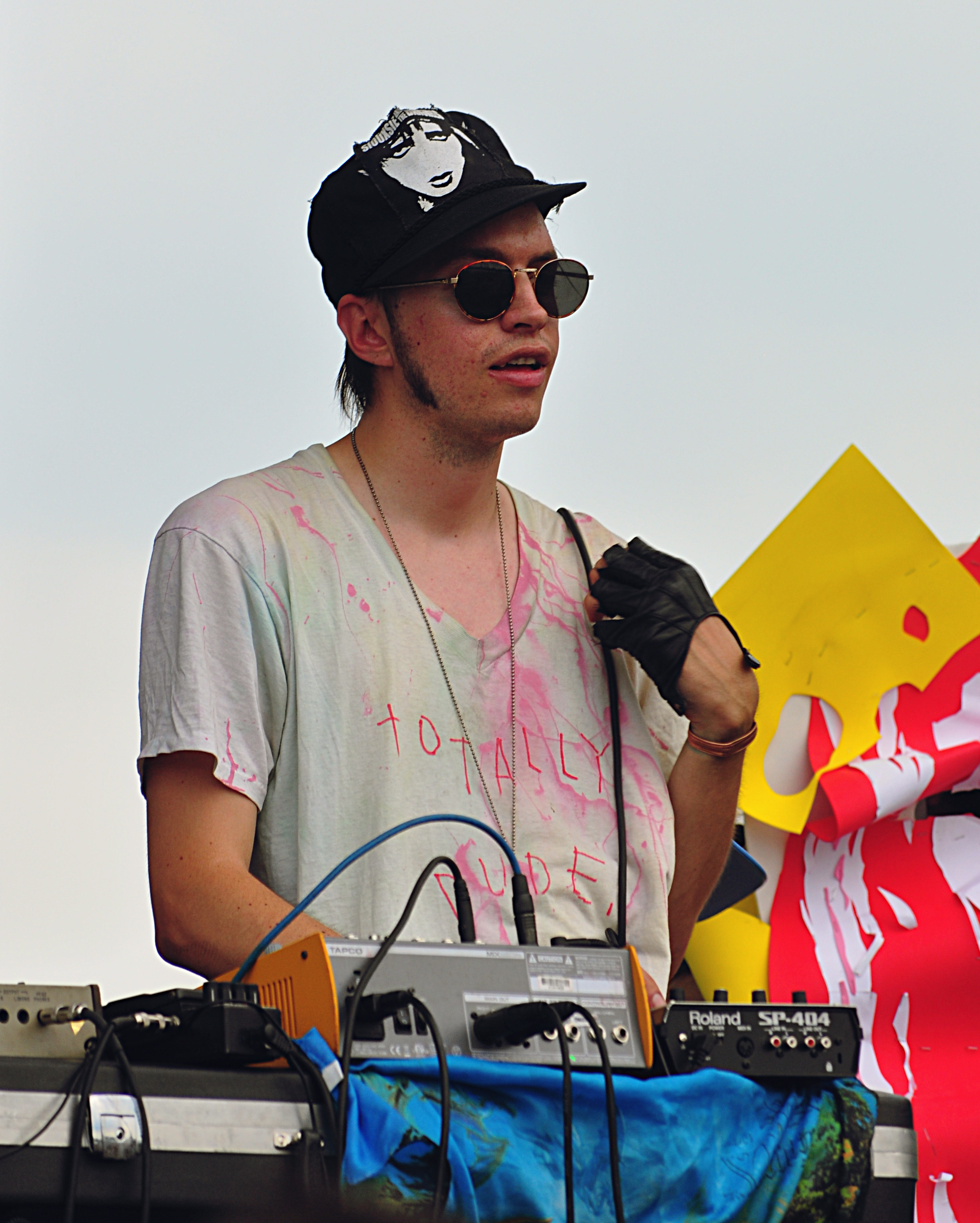
- Egedy performing as Pictureplane in 2010

Background information
- Also known as: Upsetter: Scythe; Area66
- Born: Travis James Egedy; May 1, 1985 (age 41); Santa Fe, New Mexico, U.S.
- Origin: Denver, Colorado, U.S.
- Genres: Witch house; dark wave; electropunk; indie electronic
- Occupations: Musician; producer; singer; visual artist; fashion designer
- Years active: 2004–present
- Labels: Lovepump United; Anticon; Alien Body; 100% Electronica
- Website: pictureplane.bandcamp.com

Travis James Egedy (born May 1, 1985), better known by his stage name Pictureplane, is an American electronic musician, visual artist and fashion designer based in Brooklyn, New York. He first appeared in the music scene of Denver, Colorado, making a name for himself at Rhinoceropolis, the DIY space where he also lived. He has been credited for coining the term "witch house". He is also a founder of the fashion brand Alien Body.

== Biography ==
Born in Santa Fe, New Mexico, Travis Egedy grew up a fan of hip hop. In 2001, he started making music, using the Magix Music Maker software. He was a member of the hip hop group Thinking in Circles. He moved to Denver, Colorado to attend the Rocky Mountain College of Art and Design. While at RMCAD, he became interested in noise and experimental music. In 2004, he started using the pseudonym Pictureplane. In 2006, he moved into Rhinoceropolis, the DIY space in Denver.

In 2009, Pictureplane released a studio album, Dark Rift, on Lovepump United Records. In 2011, he released a studio album, Thee Physical, on the label. In that year, he also released Thee Negative Slave Mixtape. In 2012, he moved to Brooklyn, New York.

In 2014, he released The Alien Body Mixtape, which included guest appearances from Sole, Doseone, and Noah23. In 2015, he released a studio album, Technomancer, on Anticon. His 2018 studio album, Degenerate, was released on his own record label Alien Body Music.

In 2020, Pictureplane released the first single, "Avalanche", from his upcoming 2021 album Dopamine. The album was released through George Clanton's 100% Electronica label.

On 31 October 2025, Pictureplane released his sixth studio album, Sex Distortion, through Music Website. The record, produced by Egedy himself and mastered by Ben Greenberg, features the singles "Heaven Is a State of Mind," "Velvet Lies (Metallic Garden)," and "Weeping Sky," the latter accompanied by a music video co-directed with Chris Burden.

== Discography ==
=== Studio albums ===
- Pictureplane (2004)
- Covered in Blood, Surrounded by Text (2005)
- Slit Red Bird Throat (2005)
- Turquoise Trail (2007)
- Dark Rift (2009)
- Thee Physical (2011)
- Technomancer (2015)
- Sinister Current (2017) (as Upsetter)
- Degenerate (2018)
- Dopamine (2021)
- Sex Distortion (2025)

=== Compilation albums ===
- Rare & Bloody (2013)

=== Mixtapes ===
- Thee Negative Slave Mixtape (2011)
- The Alien Body Mixtape (2014)

=== EPs ===
- The Shining Path EP (2017) (as Upsetter)
- The Degenerate Remixes (2019)

=== Singles ===
- "Trance Doll" b/w "New Mind" (2009)
- "True Ruin Light Body" (2010)
- "Real Is a Feeling" (2011)
- "Self Control" (2014)
- "Technomancer" (2015)
- "Hyper Real" b/w "Total Confusion" (2015)
- "Break Trance" b/w "Hot War (Cold Love)" (2016)
- "Standing Outside a Broken Phone Booth with Money in My Hand" (2017) (with So Drove)
- "B.D.S.M" (2018)
- "Sex Trigger (Burn in Heaven)" b/w "Low Key" (2018) (with Wicca Phase Springs Eternal)
- "Bio-Hacker" b/w "Fever Dream" (2018) (as Upsetter)
- "Shredder" (2019) (as Upsetter)
- "Avalanche" (2020)
- "Circles" (2023)
- "Velvet Lies (Metallic Garden)" (2024)
- "Heaven is a State of Mind" (2025)
- "Weeping Sky" (2025)
- "Losing My Mind" (2026)

=== Guest appearances ===
- Sole – "Coke Rap" from Nuclear Winter Volume 2: Death Panel (2011)
- Sole and the Skyrider Band – "Bad Captain Swag" from Hello Cruel World (2011)
- Deathface – "Cold Heaven" from Cry for Black Dawn (2014)
- Prayers – "Trust Issues" from Baptism of Thieves (2017)

=== Productions ===
- Noah23 – "Goth Star" from Lamp of Invisible Light (2011)
- Antwon – "Living Every Dream" from End of Earth (2012)
- Noah23 – "Tropical Fruit" from Tropical Fruit (2013)
- Antwon – "KLF ELF" from Heavy Hearted in Doldrums (2014)
- Noah23 – "Runnin Thru Yr Head" from Peacock Angel (2015)

=== Remixes ===
- Health – "Lost Time (Pictureplane RMX)" from Health//Disco (2008)
- Sole and the Skyrider Band – "Cavalry (Pictureplane Remix)" from Sole and the Skyrider Band Remix LP (2009)
- Future Islands – "Little Dreamer (Pictureplane's Old Dreamer Remix)" from Post Office Wave Chapel (2010)
- HEALTH- “DIE SLOW (PICTUREPLANE RMX)” from ::DISCO2 (2010)
- Marina and the Diamonds – "Shampain (Pictureplane's Deep Dolphin Remix)" (2010)
- Lockah – "The Sour Drink from the Ocean (Pictureplane Dark Sea Remix)" from When U Stop Feeling Like a Weirdo & Become a Threat (2012)
- Black Marble – "Pretender (Pictureplane's Open the Door Remix)" from Weight Against the Door (2012)
- HEALTH- “DRUGS EXIST (PICTUREPLANE RMX) from DISCO3+ (2015)
- Alice Glass- “White Lies (Pictureplane Remix) from Alice Glass (Remixes) (2018)
- HEALTH- “SHRED ENVY (PICTUREPLANE RMX) from R-TYPE III (2026)
