= Dark Rift (disambiguation) =

Dark Rift is a 1997 fighting game developed for the Nintendo 64 console.

Dark Rift may also refer to:

- Great Rift (astronomy), a feature of the Milky Way Galaxy
- Dark Rift, an album by Pictureplane
- "Dark Rift", a song by God Is an Astronaut from the album Age of the Fifth Sun
