= Disco3 =

Remix album by Health
- Released: February 18, 2017
- Genre: Electro-industrial; EBM; electropunk; noise rock; synthpop
- Length: 28:37
- Label: Loma Vista

Health chronology
Death Magic (2015)	Disco3 (2017)	Vol. 4: Slaves of Fear (2019)

Disco3 is a remix album by American noise rock band Health, featuring versions of songs from their third album Death Magic. It was released on February 18, 2017, under Loma Vista Recordings. A companion "second disc", Disco3+, was released as a separate album due to the preferences of music streaming platforms.

== Background and composition ==
The album was announced via a "reverse telethon" with Pauly Shore, in which Health contacted people which had previously called them on a designated hotline incorporated in their music videos.

It is considered the third remix album from Health, following Health//Disco and Health::Disco2. Additionally it also features three original compositions, including "Crusher", which was previously released via Adult Swim; these originated from a scrapped EP. Despite being a remix album, the band still made an effort to make it "feel like a real album" with the arrangement of tracks, placing more "high-powered" tracks towards the end.

== Track listing ==
=== Disco3 ===
No.	Title	Length
1.	"Euphoria"	3:27
2.	"Men Tomorrow" (Preoccupations remix)	2:00
3.	"Slum Lord"	3:01
4.	"Crusher"	3:21
5.	"Courtship II" (Roly Porter remix)	3:47
6.	"Salvia" (Marcus Whale remix)	1:33
7.	"Victim II"	2:00
8.	"Victim" (Born in Flamez remix)	2:54
9.	"Dark Enough" (Vessel remix)	3:07
10.	"Life" (Purity Ring remix)	3:25
Total length:		28:37

=== Disco3+ ===
No.	Title	Length
1.	"L.A. Looks" (Guardian remix)	4:19
2.	"Dark Enough" (CFCF remix)	5:18
3.	"Life" (Phantoms remix)	5:25
4.	"Stonefist" (Boys Noize x Health x Empress Of remix)	4:21
5.	"Men Today" (JK Flesh remix)	3:39
6.	"Stonefist" (Charge It To Tha Game remix)	2:04
7.	"Flesh World (UK)" (Xiu Xiu remix)	1:42
8.	"Drugs Exist" (Pictureplane remix)	4:40
Total length:		31:32
