= Disco4 =

2020 studio album by Health

Disco4: Part I

Studio album by Health
- Released: October 16, 2020
- Genres: Electro-industrial; noise rock; EBM; electropunk; synth-pop; industrial metal
- Length: 38:37
- Label: Loma Vista

Health chronology
Grand Theft Auto Online: Arena War (Official Soundtrack) (2019)	Disco4: Part I (2020)	Disco4+ (2021)

Disco4+

Remix album by Health
- Released: August 20, 2021
- Length: 46:27
- Label: Loma Vista

Health chronology
Disco4: Part I (2020)	Disco4+ (2021)	Disco4: Part II (2022)

Disco4: Part II

Studio album by Health
- Released: April 8, 2022
- Genres: Electro-industrial; noise rock; EBM; electropunk; synth-pop; industrial metal
- Length: 50:21
- Label: Loma Vista

Health chronology
Disco4+ (2021)	Disco4: Part II (2022)	Rat Wars (2023)

Singles from Disco4 :: Part II
- 1. "Isn't Everyone" Released: May 6, 2021; 2. "Excess" Released: September 3, 2021

Disco4 (stylized DISCO4) is an album by American noise rock band Health. A double album focused on collaborative pieces, it was released in two parts: Disco4: Part I on October 16, 2020, and Disco4: Part II on April 8, 2022. Part I also received a remix album, titled Disco4+, on August 20, 2021 (though it also contains remixes of songs from the band's previous album, Vol. 4: Slaves of Fear). Part I and Part II were also released as a combined set called Disco4 :: Generations. All of these were released through Loma Vista Recordings.

== Recording ==
The album was partially constructed from a series of collaborations the band had made over the years; some, like "Hate You" with JPEGMafia, "Delicious Ape" with Xiu Xiu, and "Mass Grave" with Soccer Mommy were previously released, but also incorporated new tracks like "Power Fantasy" with 100 gecs and two new, non-collaborative songs, "Cyberpunk 2.0.2.0." and "These Days 2.0.2.1.". Health described the record as " a collection of original collaborations with artists we admire", in contrast with their past remix albums, with the Disco title being maintained for continuity.

Singer Jake Duszik said that there could be a "fair amount of awkwardness" in the collaboration process, with it being like a "blind date", but he also said it avoided being stuck in a "cyclical rut". According to John Famiglietti, the band aimed to ensure "true collaboration" for each track, with the initial idea not "fully fleshed out"; some were started by the collaborating artist.

"D.F. Looks" was based on a remix of "L.A. Looks" by Brothel, and "Mass Grave" was derived from a session with Purity Ring. The name of "Cyberpunk 2.0.2.0." is based on the tabletop role-playing game of the same name, Cyberpunk 2020, since Health made an appearance on the soundtrack of its then-upcoming video game adaptation, Cyberpunk 2077. "Delicious Ape" with Xiu Xiu was based around a sample of an ape. For "Isn't Everyone" on Part II, the band contacted Trent Reznor of Nine Inch Nails with the expectation that they wouldn't hear back, but it became "very real" when they got a vocal track.

== Composition ==
Being a collaboration with a number of different artists, Disco4's tracks incorporate elements of a number of different genres, including electro-punk, EBM, post-rock, and trap. Part II was described by Simon K. of Sputnikmusic as including more metal elements than the first half.

== Reception ==
Professional ratings (Part I)
Review scores
Source	Rating
Flood Magazine	8/10
Sputnikmusic	4.3/5
The Line of Best Fit	7.5/10

Professional ratings (Part II)
Aggregate scores
Source	Rating
Metacritic	77/100
Review scores
Source	Rating
AllMusic	4/5 stars
Sputnikmusic	4.2/5
The Line of Best Fit	7/10 stars
Kerrang!	3/5

Part I was generally well-received, with KEXP saying "The album coheres surprisingly well, with the sound being a dark, ominous blend of industrial, noise-rock, metal, and electronic styles." Flood Magazine's Mike Lesuer stated that the tracks "don’t feel out of place, half-cocked, or ill-conceived", with the album "weirdly [feeling] like one of the most cohesive musical capsules for 2020". Simon K. agreed, stating all but one "feels and sounds surprisingly well developed and expertly handled", but criticised a "couple of stylistic clashes".

The second half received a score of 77 out of 100 on review aggregator Metacritic based on five reviews, indicating "generally favorable" reception. AllMusic's Heather Phares described the melding of genres as working "remarkably well". Simon K. called it a "fantastic album" but perceived it as becoming "samey" after its midway point. Kate Crudgington of The Line of Best Fit called it "proof that HEALTH’s talent and appetite for collaboration is as potent as ever". Kerrang! writer Paul Travers stated that while he thought it "isn't perfect, it's definitely worth your time".

According to the North American College and Community Radio Chart Top 200 charts Part I peaked at 29 the week of November 10.

== Track listing ==
=== Disco4: Part I ===
No.	Title	Collaborating artist	Length
1.	"Cyberpunk 2.0.2.0."		5:12
2.	"Body/Prison"	Perturbator	2:44
3.	"Power Fantasy"	100 gecs	3:01
4.	"Judgement Night"	Ghostemane	2:00
5.	"Innocence"	Youth Code	2:32
6.	"Full of Health"	Full of Hell	2:16
7.	"Colors"	The Soft Moon	4:04
8.	"Hate You"	JPEGMafia	1:48
9.	"D.F. Looks"	Brothel	3:09
10.	"Mass Grave"	Soccer Mommy	3:07
11.	"Delicious Ape"	Xiu Xiu	5:43
12.	"Hard to Be a God"	Nolife	2:56

=== Disco4+ ===
No.	Title	Length
1.	"Judgement Night" (Sidewalks & Skeletons remix)	2:43
2.	"Colors" (Thomas Banks remix)	5:09
3.	"NC-17" (Soma for Savages remix)	2:57
4.	"Full of Health" (Nolife remix)	2:21
5.	"The Message" (Big Time Kill remix)	4:29
6.	"Mass Grave" (Brothel remix)	2:57
7.	"Loss Deluxe" (Shapednoise remix)	2:33
8.	"Black Static" (Cura Machines remix)	4:49
9.	"Strange Days (1999)" (Harboured remix)	3:30
10.	"Strange Days (1999)" (Threats remix)	2:54
11.	"Slaves of Fear" (Comaduster remix)	6:19
12.	"Cyberpunk 2.0.2.0." (Second Skin remix)	5:40
Total length:		46:27

=== Disco4: Part II ===
No.	Title	Collaborating artist	Length
1.	"Dead Flowers"	Poppy	5:01
2.	"Isn't Everyone"	Nine Inch Nails	5:14
3.	"Murder Death Kill"	Ada Rook, PlayThatBoiZay	2:01
4.	"Identity"	Maenad Veyl	3:25
5.	"Cold Blood"	Lamb of God	5:26
6.	"AD 1000"	The Body	4:57
7.	"Gnostic Flesh/Mortal Hell"	Backxwash, Ho99o9	3:39
8.	"The Joy of Sect"	Street Sects	3:23
9.	"Still Breathing"	Ekkstacy	5:21
10.	"No Escape"	The Neighbourhood	3:34
11.	"Excess"	Perturbator	4:24
12.	"These Days 2.0.2.1."		3:48
Total length:			50:21

Notes

- All track titles are stylized in all caps.
