= Max Payne 3 (soundtrack) =

Soundtrack album by Health
- Released: May 23, 2012
- Length: 76:25
- Label: Rockstar Games

Health chronology
Health::Disco2 (2010)	Max Payne 3 (2012)	Death Magic (2015)

Singles from Max Payne 3
- 1. "Tears" Released: May 15, 2012

Max Payne 3 is the soundtrack album by Health for the 2012 video game of the same name by Rockstar Games. The final track of the album is a bonus track, "9 Circulos" by Brazilian rapper Emicida. The single "Tears", the only track with on the album to feature vocals by Health was released digitally to coincide with the game's release on 15 May 2012, the album followed a week later.

Max Payne 3 was Health's first time composing a score. It took them over nine months (Note: Later sources would state the process took a year, thirteen months, or even "over a year and a half".) to compose and record six hours of music for the game. From this, the band selected the best parts for the soundtrack album. The overall sound of the album is more restrained than Health's earlier abrasive noise rock output. Health expanded their musical palette for the album, this included the increased use of electronics, and the incorporation of influences from Brazil, where the game is set.

Critical reception was positive, critics noted how rare it was for an established band to score a video game, and Rockstar Games were praised for commissioning the work. While some critics found Health constrained by the demands of a video game score, the band still managed to deliver their signature sound.

The Max Payne 3 soundtrack opened up Health to a larger audience, and introduced them to future collaborators. Health worked with Rockstar again, contributing a track to Grand Theft Auto V (2013), and scoring Grand Theft Auto Online's Arena War (2018) downloadable content. A tenth anniversary vinyl release of the album was announced in 2022.

== Development ==
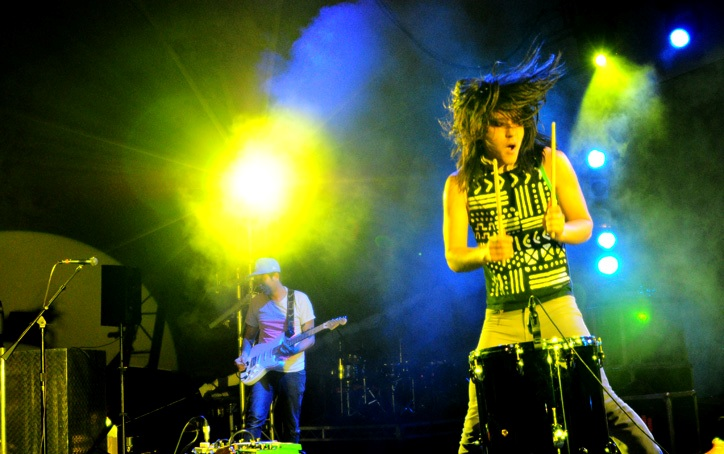
Health performing in 2010

Rockstar approached Health in June 2011 for contributions to the Max Payne 3 score. Health were asked to contribute additional layers of music for the high intensity action sequences of the game, but found that their sound did not combine well with the existing score. Instead, Health tried scoring a level on their own, producing a track more melancholic, sombre, and muted compared to their previous noise-rock output. Following an enthusiastic response from Rockstar, Health were commissioned to score the entire game.

The score took nine months to complete and consisted of six hours of music. During the process, the band communicated near-daily with Ivan Pavlovich, the Rockstar director of music, and they made many revisions based on Rockstar's feedback. Reflecting on the process in 2015, Health recalled it took many long nights to the detriment of their health and personal lives. Regardless, Health bassist and producer John Famiglietti, said it was "incredibly gratifying. And we would totally do it again."

Health composed the score based on gameplay footage. To accommodate for the player-directed pacing of a video game, their music was broken down into stems - tracks with limited instrumentation. These stems could then be looped and recombined dynamically depending on the action on screen. For the early levels of the game set in North America, the score references the cello theme of the first two games, while the later Brazil sections exhibit Brazilian influences, and are more distinctly Health. The only Health track to feature vocals is "Tears", which plays during the climactic airport shootout. The song was featured in the game's trailers and was released before the album as a standalone single.

From the score, the most interesting tracks were selected for inclusion in the soundtrack album, omitting droning passages which were written purely to complement the action within the game. Some tracks cut from the album were released in 2020 as Blasphemy: Max Payne Rarities for Health's Patreon subscribers.

The band credits Max Payne 3, and the sheer amount of music they had to produce for it, for expanding their musical palette. Former band member Jupiter Keyes says they became " more comfortable with using computers in the writing process", and the greater use of electronics can be heard in their later albums Death Magic and Vol. 4: Slaves of Fear. Reflecting on the soundtrack ten years after its release, guitarist and vocalist Jake Duzsik noted its use of the baritone guitar through an effects unit, something new for the band at that point, but that had since become one of their staple sounds. Duzsik credits Max Payne 3 for expanding Health's reach; not only bringing them to the attention of new listeners, but also to future collaborators such as JPEGMafia. The very online nature of their new gaming fan-base allowed Health to more easily communicate with them during the COVID-19 pandemic. Health would work for Rockstar again, contributing a track to Grand Theft Auto V (2013), and scoring Grand Theft Auto Online's Arena War (2018) downloadable content.

The album closes with the bonus track "9 Circulos" by Emicida, a Brazilian rapper and native to São Paulo where most of the game is set. The track exhibits maracatu and samba influences, and is themed around the concept of an "astrological inferno - when all the planets are aligned against you". Emicida tried to capture the contrasts present in the city, and his lyrics highlight its social problems such as police violence, calling out then mayor Kassab by name.

== Reception ==
Professional ratings
Review scores
Source	Rating
Cokemachineglow	77%
Consequence	C-
Noisey	A
Pitchfork	7.0/10.0
Sputnikmusic	4.5/5.0
Tiny Mix Tapes	3.0/5.0

Critical reception towards the soundtrack was largely positive, video game outlets Kotaku and Game Informer published articles praising Rockstar's decision to recruit Health, a band with a unique sound, rather than relying on a standard Hollywood-style orchestral score used in other big-budget video games. Critics at music outlets likewise noted how having an established band scoring a video game could indicate an increasing level of maturity for video games as a medium.

Trevor Sane, in a review for Noisey noted how the "sonic palette here is much bigger than the band’s own records". Critics heard influences of other soundtracks in Max Payne 3, multiple writers compared it to John Carpenter, or Brad Fiedel's work on the Terminator series. Still, Health retained their identity; Calum Marsh described the album at Cokemachineglow as being "drenched in the unmistakable guitar and synthesizer melange that is [Health's] trademark sound".

Mike Diver, writing for the BBC described "Tears" as the standout track on the album. Likewise, Adam Kivel at Consequence described it as the "only fully-formed song" on the album, which unlike the rest of the soundtrack, could exist without the context of the narrative and would not sound out of place in any other of Health's releases. "Tears" would later establish itself as a core part of Health's live set-list.

Critics felt Health were at times constrained by the demands of a video game score. Joe Hemmerling wrote in Tiny Mix Tapes that BJ Miller's drumming "[felt] particularly straightjacketed at times", without the rapid changes in tempo of the band's previous output. Brian Howe at Pitchfork found the music could be somewhat straightforward, and that "you can never completely forget that some of it exists solely to make running down generic corridors feel heroic." Still, reviewers concluded this did not stop the album from working as a standalone listening experience.

At the 2012 Spike Video Game Awards, "Tears" was nominated for Best Song in a Game Award, and Max Payne 3 was nominated for Best Score, though lost out to "Cities" by Beck from Sound Shapes, and Austin Wintory's Journey score respectively. The Los Angeles Times music writer August Brown placed the album in his top 10 list of 2012, writing that it offers "a new way of thinking about how music scores can work."

In 2022, Rockstar Games announced a tenth anniversary re-release of the album with additional tracks. The release was scheduled for later in the year, and would have seen the album appear on vinyl for the first time. As of 2026, this version has not been released.

== Track listing ==
No.	Title	Length
1.	"Sampa"	1:24
2.	"Shells"	5:28
3.	"Painkiller"	6:15
4.	"Max: NJ"	4:13
5.	"Torture"	3:33
6.	"Max: Docks"	2:37
7.	"The Girl"	4:35
8.	"Max: Kill"	3:08
9.	"+90"	1:26
10.	"Fabiana"	2:31
11.	"Max: Favela"	2:01
12.	"Dead"	4:18
13.	"Guns"	2:13
14.	"Max: Panama"	4:09
15.	"The Imperial Palace"	1:50
16.	"16 230"	2:10
17.	"U.F.E."	1:06
18.	"Combat Drugs"	3:18
19.	"Pills"	1:06
20.	"Future"	4:41
21.	"Max: Finale"	2:04
22.	"Birth"	1:16
23.	"Pain"	3:30
24.	"Tears"	4:17
25.	"9 Circulos" (By Emicida)	3:16
Total length:		76:25
