= Courtship (disambiguation) =

Courtship is the period of development towards an intimate relationship.

Courtship may also refer to:

== Film and TV ==
- Courtship, 1961 French documentary with Geneviève Bujold
- Courtship (Persian: Khastegari), 1989 Iranian film with Soraya Ghasemi
- Courtship, act 2 from the play Part 2, The Story of a Marriage, 1912–1917 from The Orphans' Home Cycle, by Horton Foote
  - Courtship (film), a 1987 American drama film of that act

== Music ==
- "Courtship", song by Bob James
- "Courtship", song by American noise rock band Health from Health 2007
- "Courtship", song by Björk from Utopia
- "Courtship", track by Thomas Newman from He Named Me Malala soundtrack

== See also ==
- Courtship display
