= Thee Physical =

Studio album by Pictureplane
- Released: July 19, 2011
- Studio: Rhinoceropolis, Denver, Colorado
- Genre: Electronic
- Length: 45:30
- Label: Lovepump United Records
- Producer: Travis Egedy, Jupiter Keyes, Mookie Singerman

Pictureplane chronology
Dark Rift (2009)	Thee Physical (2011)	Technomancer (2015)

Singles from Thee Physical
- 1. "Real Is a Feeling" Released: May 17, 2011

Thee Physical is a studio album by American electronic musician Pictureplane. It was released by Lovepump United Records on July 19, 2011. Music videos were created for "Real Is a Feeling", "Post Physical", "Black Nails", and "Negative Slave".

== Critical reception ==
Professional ratings
Aggregate scores
Source	Rating
Metacritic	73/100
Review scores
Source	Rating
AllMusic	4/5 stars
The A.V. Club	B+
CMJ	favorable
Consequence of Sound	C+
Pitchfork	7.0/10
PopMatters	7/10 stars
Resident Advisor	3.5/5
Spin	mixed
The Washington Post	favorable

At Metacritic, which assigns a weighted average score out of 100 to reviews from mainstream critics, Thee Physical received an average score of 73, based on 11 reviews, indicating "generally favorable reviews".

Kate Shapiro of CMJ said, "Pictureplane's Travis Egedy has always been one for fist-pumping, electronic opuses, but Thee Physical, with its exploration of gender and sexuality, marks a departure from the big, electronic sound and a move to, well, damn good pop songs." Matt James of PopMatters gave the album 7 stars out of 10, saying: "despite some desperately un-sexy, clumsy faux-pas in the introduction, Thee Physical does ultimately deliver a gratifyingly memorable evening and is ripe for the plucking." David Malitz of The Washington Post called it "Pictureplane's most professional collection of songs to date."

Stereogum placed it at number 28 on the "Top 50 Albums of 2011" list.

== Track listing ==
No.	Title	Length
1.	"Body Mod"	3:58
2.	"Black Nails"	4:03
3.	"Sex Mechanism"	3:08
4.	"Touching Transform"	4:43
5.	"Post Physical"	4:16
6.	"Techno Fetish"	4:00
7.	"Real Is a Feeling"	4:34
8.	"Trancegender"	4:16
9.	"Negative Slave"	3:22
10.	"Breath Work"	4:09
11.	"Thee Power Hand"	5:01

== Personnel ==
Credits adapted from liner notes.

- Travis Egedy – production, recording, artwork, layout, hand fashion design
- Jupiter Keyes – co-production, mixing
- Mookie Singerman – additional production (4, 10)
- Yasmine Kittles – vocals (1), backing vocals (8, 10)
- Lauren Devine – hand fashion design
- Marco Rosso – hand photography
