= Technomancer (album) =

Studio album by Pictureplane
- Released: October 30, 2015
- Recorded: 2013–2015
- Studio: Brooklyn, New York; Los Angeles, California
- Genre: Electronic
- Length: 39:43
- Label: Anticon
- Producer: Travis Egedy

Pictureplane chronology
Thee Physical (2011)	Technomancer (2015)	Degenerate (2018)

Singles from Technomancer
- 1. "Self Control" Released: May 13, 2014; 2. "Technomancer" Released: September 1, 2015

Technomancer is a studio album by American electronic musician Pictureplane. It was released by Anticon on October 30, 2015. Music videos were created for "Self Control", "Technomancer", "Death Condition", and "Joyrider".

== Production ==
Most of the album was created using the Access Virus synthesizer. Pictureplane also used an old desktop computer. Brad Hoss, Dre Skull, D Gookin, and Lars Stafford helped engineer the album. "Self Control" and "Live Forever" featured guest vocalist Grace Hall.

Pictureplane described it as "an album about our current relationship with technology and how it is defining our existence right now." The title of the album refers to "someone who uses technology for magical purposes."

== Critical reception ==
Professional ratings
Review scores
Source	Rating
AllMusic	3.5/5 stars
Pitchfork	5.9/10
PopMatters	7/10 stars
Spectrum Culture	2.75/5

Derek Staples of Spectrum Culture gave the album a 2.75 out of 5, calling it "an amalgam of androgynous lyricism, shoegaze electronics, second-wave acid techno and downtempo darkwave." Matt James of PopMatters gave the album 7 stars out of 10, saying: "It's anarchic, noisy, sweaty, somewhat scrappy at times, but a ton of fun."

Writing for Under the Radar, Tamaryn included it on her "Top 12 Albums of 2015" list.

== Track listing ==
No.	Title	Length
1.	"Sick Machine"	3:33
2.	"Esoterrorist"	4:26
3.	"Joyrider"	3:27
4.	"Death Condition"	2:56
5.	"Street Pressure"	3:27
6.	"Harsh Realm"	3:43
7.	"Self Control"	4:16
8.	"Chaos Radical"	3:52
9.	"Technomancer"	3:28
10.	"Riot Porn"	3:19
11.	"Live Forever"	3:23

== Personnel ==
Credits adapted from liner notes.

- Travis Egedy – artwork, layout, design, music
- Grace Hall – vocals (7, 11)
- Brad Hoss – mixing, engineering
- Dre Skull – mixing, engineering
- D Gookin – mixing, engineering
- Lars Stalfors – mixing, engineering
- Daddy Kev – mastering
- Ryan A. Rossi – skull isosurfaces
