= Conflict DLC =

Studio album by Health
- Released: December 11, 2025
- Studios: Venice Way; Martinsound
- Genres: Electro-industrial; industrial metal
- Length: 39:21
- Label: Loma Vista
- Producer: Stint

Health chronology
Rat Wars (2023)	Conflict DLC (2025)	R-Type (2026)

Singles from Conflict DLC
- 1. "Ordinary Loss" Released: September 11, 2025; 2. "Vibe Cop" Released: October 3, 2025; 3. "Thought Leader" Released: October 23, 2025; 4. "You Died" Released: November 6, 2025; 5. "Shred Envy" Released: November 21, 2025; 6. "Antidote" Released: December 8, 2025

Conflict DLC is the sixth studio album by American industrial rock band Health. It was released on December 11, 2025, through Loma Vista Recordings, receiving positive reviews.

== Background and recording ==
Conflict DLC is presented as a continuation of Health's previous album, Rat Wars, with the album art depicting the track listing as a C and D side; the album's name is a reference to downloadable content in video gaming. The material originated during sessions for Rat Wars, but eventually only three leftover songs were retained. Initially, it was intended to release as a double album, but singer Jacob Duszik said that the format was "exclusively considered a good idea by the people who release them".

Like Rat Wars, Conflict DLC is produced by Stint. However, Health chose to recruit Drew Fulk to mix the album as they liked his work on Knocked Loose's most recent record, You Won't Go Before You're Supposed To. Lars Stalfors is also credited with mixing work on the album. Willie Adler of Lamb of God, who was previously featured on Rat Wars, was recruited to fix a riff that Perturbator described as "dogshit" during a listening session.

== Composition ==
The album has been described as having elements of industrial metal and electronic music. It is sonically similar to Rat Wars; Raul Stanciu of Sputnikmusic called it a "direct follow up", and Duszik stated it has an identical "sonic palette". The latter described it as still being "distinctive", calling it "more uptempo", and "more aggressive and more desperate, but... also more fun"; the change towards a heavier sound being partially influenced by other bands that were scheduled to perform at Knotfest in Australia.

== Promotion and release ==
The album was announced alongside the first single "Ordinary Loss" on 11 September 2025. As part of the announcement, Health instated an "Operation Jueves" involving the band releasing new material every Thursday, including content for the R-Type series of remix albums. This was followed by "Vibe Cop", featuring Adler, on October 3. "Thought Leader" was released on October 23, "You Died" on November 6, "Shred Envy" on November 21, and "Antidote" on December 8. The complete album was released on 11 December 2025 via Loma Vista Recordings.

== Reception ==
DIY magazine reviewer Joe Goggins described Conflict DLC as a "purification" of their previous work, and Stanciu stated it was "more organic" and possessed tracks that "hit harder" than those of Rat Wars. Metal Hammer writer Matt Mills commended Drew Fulk's presence on the album, comparing the heavier moments on the album to an "all-consuming detonation". Ben Scanga of Spill Magazine praised the album for its thematic content, describing it as a "laser beam of ambition and compassionate energy".

== Tracklist ==
All lyrics are written by Jacob Duzsik.

Conflict DLC track listing
No.	Title	Length
1.	"Ordinary Loss"	3:53
2.	"Burn the Candles"	3:14
3.	"Vibe Cop"	2:53
4.	"Trash Decade"	2:35
5.	"Torture II"	1:07
6.	"Antidote"	3:04
7.	"Darkage"	3:11
8.	"Shred Envy"	3:43
9.	"You Died"	3:24
10.	"Thought Leader"	3:22
11.	"Don't Kill Yourself"	2:35
12.	"Wasted Years"	6:20
Total length:		39:21

== Personnel ==
Credits adapted from the album's liner notes and Tidal.

=== Health ===
- Jacob Duzsik – vocals (tracks 1–4, 6–12), keyboards (2–6, 8, 11, 12), guitar (2, 5, 6, 8–12)
- Johnny Famiglietti – programming (1–4, 7, 8), bass guitar (1, 3, 4, 10, 12), keyboards (7), artwork, package design
- Benjamin Miller – drums (1, 3, 4, 8, 10–12)

=== Additional contributors ===
- Stint – production (all tracks), programming (1–4, 6–12), keyboards (1, 3–6, 8–12), bass guitar (2, 7, 8), guitar (3, 4, 8, 11, 12)
- Anthony Dolhai – engineering
- Wzrd Bld – mixing (1–4, 7, 8, 10–12), guitar (1, 4, 8, 10)
- Lars Stalfors – mixing (5, 6, 9)
- Jeff Dunne – mixing assistance (1–4, 7, 8, 10–12)
- Hamish Patrick – engineering assistance (5, 6, 9)
- Ruairi O'Flaherty – mastering
- Matthew "Hoju" Neighbour – drum engineering, immersive mixing
- Mynxii White – interior photography
- Richie Valdez – exterior photography
- Joe McKinney – artwork, package design, creative direction
- Swarm – synthesizers, guitars (1, 7)
- Leo Ashline – background vocals (1, 6, 8, 10)
- Nick Long – guitar (1, 3)
- Willie Adler – guitar (3)
- Brutei – additional production (4)
- Sarah Graves – guitar (8, 12)
- Corin Roddick – synthesizers (11)

== Charts ==
Chart performance for Conflict DLC
Chart (2025)	Peak position
French Rock & Metal Albums (SNEP)	79
UK Album Downloads (Official Charts)	19
UK Rock & Metal Albums (Official Charts)	35
