= Isn't Everyone =

Single by Health and Nine Inch Nails

from the album Disco4: Part II
- Released: May 6, 2021
- Genre: Industrial rock
- Length: 5:14
- Label: Loma Vista
- Songwriters: Jake Duzsik; John Famiglietti; B.J. Miller; Trent Reznor; Atticus Ross
- Producers: Health; Nine Inch Nails; Corin Roddick

Health singles chronology
"Cyberpunk 2.0.2.0." (2020)	"Isn't Everyone" (2021)	"Anti-Life" (2021)

Nine Inch Nails singles chronology
"God Break Down the Door" (2018)	"Isn't Everyone" (2021)	"As Alive as You Need Me to Be" (2025)

"Isn't Everyone" is a song by American industrial / noise rock band Health, featuring American industrial rock band Nine Inch Nails. Released on 6 May 2021, the song served as the lead single from Health's studio album Disco4: Part II (2022). It is the first instance of Trent Reznor and Atticus Ross being featured on another artist's song under the Nine Inch Nails moniker.

== Background ==
Health first announced "Isn't Everyone" on social media on 3 May 2021, discussing the song in more detail in an interview posted by journalist David Farrier on his Webworm blog the same day. Frontman Jake Duzsik recounted the experience of working with Reznor for the first time since Health opened for Nine Inch Nails in 2008:

"I had not heard from him in a really long time, but I knew if I sent him an email and he was busy, he'd be busy and he just wouldn't respond, or he'd respond and say 'I'm busy.' [...] We sent him a demo and we did it very purposefully, where we sent something that was very skeletal. Because if you sent mostly a done track, that is not a collaboration — you are asking someone to guest on it. And the thing that ended up being really remarkable on it was we have done a lot of these collaborations now, and there can be a fair amount of awkwardness and not knowing — getting comfortable with your bandmates takes time — so you never know what it's going to be like. But Atticus and Trent put in more effort and more time — we did conference calls! They take everything they do very seriously so it was very deliberate, with a lot of attention to detail."

Duzsik also described the themes and inspiration behind the song:

"I think at the time it was written — part of the reason we wanted it to come out so quickly, is that being an American in America, we were in the middle of Trumpocolypse [sic] and George Floyd and so there is some pretty poignant messaging relating to that specific experience."

== Reception ==
"Isn't Everyone" was met with primarily positive reviews. Consequence crowned it their "Song of the Week", praising the "churning and intentionally grating" track as "a return to form for the members of Nine Inch Nails". The song was further described by Spin as "equal parts danceable and haunting — impossible to nail down and post-apocalyptic", while Loudwire characterized it as a "dark, moody and slightly sinister sounding [track, which] encapsulates that slightly unnerving darkness that both acts thrive at." A Kerrang! review for Disco4: Part II singled the collaborative track out as a 'big hitter" with "a darkly slick pulse of industrial rock".
