= Music of Grand Theft Auto V =

Music of 2013 video game

The music for the 2013 action-adventure video game Grand Theft Auto V, developed by Rockstar North and published by Rockstar Games, was composed by German electronic music group Tangerine Dream, American composer Woody Jackson, and American hip hop musicians The Alchemist and Oh No. The game is the first entry in the Grand Theft Auto series to make use of an original score. In collaboration with each other, the musicians produced over twenty hours of music which scores the game's missions. Some of the works produced by the musicians throughout the game's development influenced some of the in-game missions and sparked inspiration for further score development. Grand Theft Auto V has an in-game radio that can tune into sixteen stations playing more than 441 tracks of licensed music, as well as two talk radio stations. The composers of the score wanted it to accompany the licensed music, as opposed to detract from it.

The game's music has been released on five official soundtracks: The Music of Grand Theft Auto V, released alongside the initial launch of the game, consists of three volumes comprising the score, and selections from the in-game radio; The Cinematographic Score — GTA 5, an electronic album released in March 2014, comprises tracks composed and produced by Tangerine Dream founder Edgar Froese; Welcome to Los Santos, released with the Windows version of the game, features songs from the in-game radio station "The Lab", produced by The Alchemist and Oh No; Grand Theft Auto Online: Arena War (Official Soundtrack), released in March 2019, features music by Health for the Grand Theft Auto Online expansion Arena War; and DāM-FunK Presents The Music of Grand Theft Auto Online Original Score, released in December 2023, is a collection of music from Grand Theft Auto Online produced by Dam-Funk. A series of singles from the Grand Theft Auto Online expansions The Cayo Perico Heist and The Contract were released in December 2020 and February 2022, respectively. Critical reception to the soundtracks was positive, as reviewers felt that the music connected appropriately with the gameplay.

== Production and composition ==
"Welcome to Los Santos"
"Welcome to Los Santos", the game's main theme, was composed by Oh No. He collaborated with several other musicians to produce original music for the game.

Grand Theft Auto V uses an original score, unlike most of its predecessors. Music supervisor Ivan Pavlovich summarised the original score idea as "daunting", because it was unprecedented for a Grand Theft Auto game. Like most previous series entries, the game uses licensed music tracks provided by an in-game radio as well. Pavlovich hoped that the original score would enhance the licensed music use, not detract from it. He further noted the balancing act between the score's "ambient subtext and tensions" and the game's onscreen action. To work on the score, Rockstar engaged The Alchemist, Oh No, Tangerine Dream and Woody Jackson, the latter of which had previously worked on Red Dead Redemption, L.A. Noire and Max Payne 3's music. The team of producers collaborated over several years to create more than twenty hours of music that scores both the game's missions and dynamic gameplay throughout the single-player and multiplayer modes.

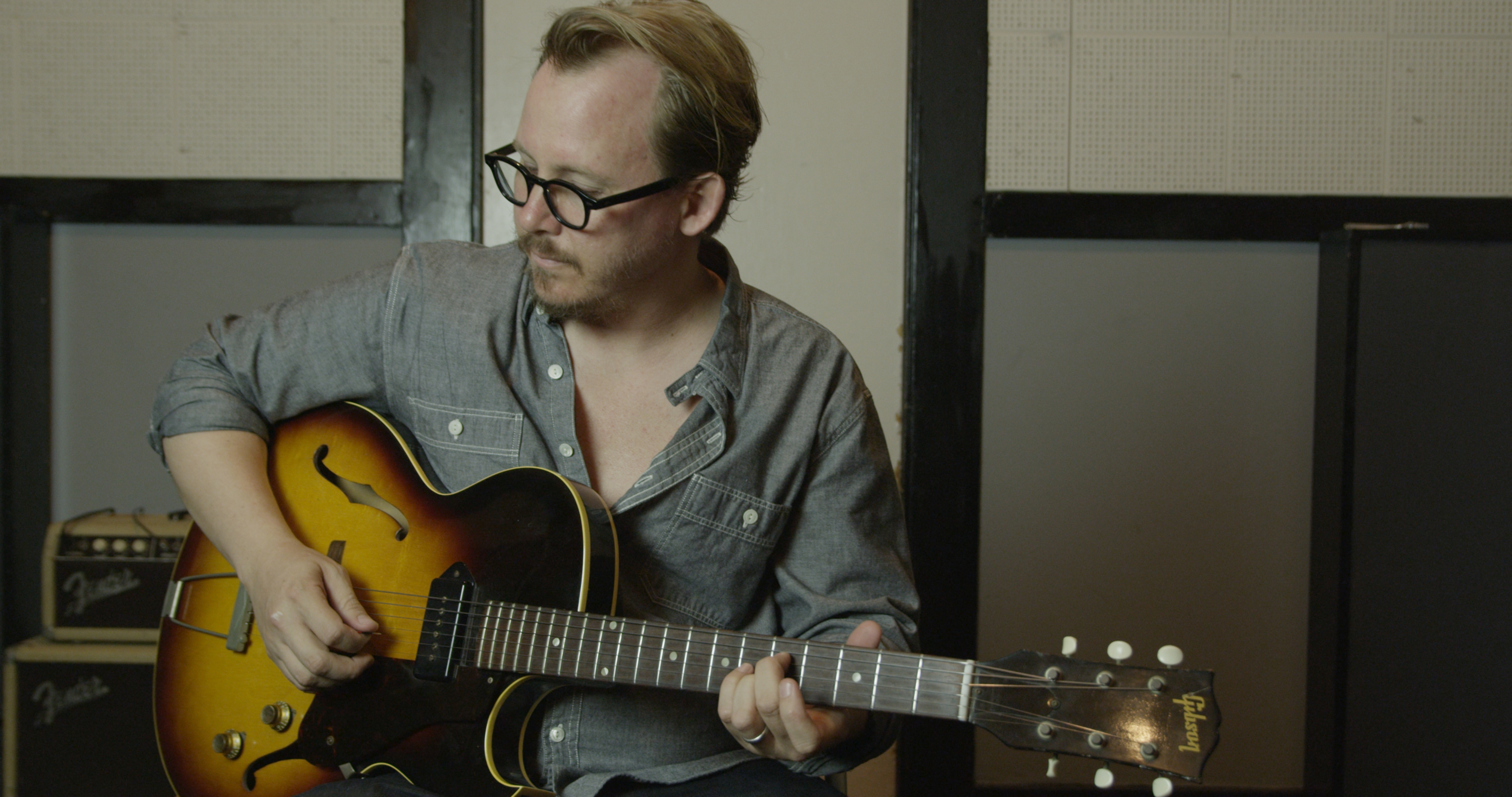
Woody Jackson, who had worked on several prior Rockstar games, collaborated with a team of producers to create more than twenty hours of original music for the game's soundtrack.

Early in the game's development, the music team were shown an early build before starting work on the score. Their work was mostly complete later in development but they continued composing until its final build was submitted for manufacturing. Edgar Froese, Tangerine Dream's founding member, initially rejected the offer of producing music for a video game. After he was flown to the studio and shown the game, he was impressed by its scale and cinematic nature, and changed his mind. Froese's first eight months of work on the score produced 62 hours of music. He recorded with Tangerine Dream in Austria but further work was conducted at Jackson's United States studio, which The Alchemist and Oh No used as well.

Jackson's initial role was to provide score for Trevor's missions, and he took influence from artists such as The Mars Volta and Queens of the Stone Age. When he learnt that the team would be building off each other's work, he voiced concern that the finished product could be disjointed. After sharing his work with the team, he was particularly impressed by Froese's contributions. "Edgar evolved the music, made it into a whole other thing", Jackson said. Froese had interpolated funk sounds with Jackson's hip-hop influences. Froese and Jackson then sent their work between The Alchemist and Oh No, who heavily sampled it. The Alchemist opined, "We were sampling, taking a piece from here, a piece from there ... We pitched stuff up, chopped it, tweaked it. Then we chose the tracks that worked and everyone came in and layered on that". DJ Shadow then mixed the team's creations together and matched it to the gameplay. Pavlovich considered "how to make the hip-hop and rock score not sound like they were instrumentals of songs on the radio, but rather something unique to the score" a challenge.

Pavlovich found that while Rockstar assigned the team missions to write music for, some of their random creations influenced other missions and sparked inspiration for further score development. He discussed a "stem-based" system used to make music fit dynamic game factors where the team would compose music to underscore outcomes players could make immediately after completing missions. Each of these stems, Froese reflected, included up to 62 five-minute WAV files, which were sent to Pavlovich in New York. "He then created, very professionally, a mix down for each of the eight stems needed for a mission and sent out the material to the other artists involved", Froese elaborated. Oh No drew from scenes within the game to make his work feel contextually pertinent with the action onscreen. The iconographic introduction of Los Santos early in the game, for example, inspired him to "create a smooth West Coast vibe that embodied" the city. He supplied horns, electric and bass guitars, and percussion parts to fit with the car chase scenes. "We wanted everything to set the right tone", he explained.

=== Radio station music ===
Since the game's location is modelled on Southern California, the developers attempted to create an accurate representation of the region. Production of the soundtrack also consisted of licensing music for the radio stations, and selecting a disc jockey that matches the genre of music the station hosts. The soundtrack consists of a wide variety of radio stations that play different genres of music, including reggae, hip hop, hardcore punk, pop and country. In September 2014, it was announced that new songs would be added to some of the radio stations in the next-gen releases of the game.

In developing the radio stations, the development team sought to reinforce the game's recreation of California by licensing tracks they felt appropriately echoed a "Cali feel". On the inclusion of the pop station Non-Stop-Pop FM, music supervisor Ivan Pavlovich noted "the first time you get off an airplane in L.A. and you hear the radio and the pop just seeps out... We wanted that. It really connects you to the world". He felt that music licensing for the game involved a greater discernment than in Grand Theft Auto IV, as the music in Grand Theft Auto V played a greater role in building a Californian atmosphere. "It reflects the environment in which the game is set", he explained. Initially, the team planned to license over 900 tracks for the radio, but over time they refined the total number of tracks to 241.

The tracks are shared between 18 stations, including two talk radio stations. Some of the tracks were written specifically for the game; for example, rapper and producer Flying Lotus hosts the station FlyLo FM which includes original work he composed for the game. For each of the radio stations, over time the team would develop an understanding of where the station's music was going and then select a DJ to host the station. Each station's DJ was selected with the mindset that they would match the genre of music the station hosts; for example, in developing Los Santos Rock Radio the team licensed classic rock tracks and it was decided that Kenny Loggins was a fitting choice as the station's DJ.

Additionally, PC users will get exclusive customizable radio station Self Radio, where users are allowed to include their favorite tunes into the game.

== Soundtracks ==
=== The Music of Grand Theft Auto V ===
The Music of Grand Theft Auto V

Soundtrack album by various artists
- Released: 24 September 2013
- Studios: Vox Recording (Los Angeles, CA) – The Score
- Genre: Soundtrack
- Length: 216:13 (full soundtrack) (Note: 63:17 (Volume 1) 78:40 (Volume 2) 74:16 (Volume 3))
- Labels: Rockstar Games; Mass Appeal
- Producers: Woody Jackson; Ivan Pavlovich; (The Score)

Rockstar Games chronology
| Max Payne 3 Official Soundtrack (2012) | The Music of Grand Theft Auto V (2013) | Welcome to Los Santos (2015) |

The Music of Grand Theft Auto V was released digitally on 24 September 2013, in three volumes, including an original score composed for the game in addition to selections from songs that were licensed for the in-game radio. The retail version of the soundtrack was released on 9 December 2014, for CD and vinyl through Mass Appeal Records.

In the context of the game, The Music of Grand Theft Auto V was well received. James Stephanie Sterling of Destructoid considered the game's sound design "impeccable", directing praise at the score. The staff at Edge wrote that the licensed music "enrich[es] Los Santos' already remarkable sense of space" and considered that the original score enhanced the atmosphere of the gameplay, retrospectively noting

"...it's only in replaying GTAV's missions that you come to appreciate the complexity and power of [Rockstar's] bespoke, dynamic score, whose rhythms do so much to achieve that age-old videogame goal of creating the sensation of playing a movie."

Carolyn Petit of GameSpot also thought that the score "lends missions more cinematic flavour", while Jeff Gerstmann of Giant Bomb said that the score helped enhance dramatic tension during missions. Keza MacDonald of IGN commented that the licensed music had been selected well, and agreed that the original score "builds tension" on missions. Alex Young of Consequence of Sound considered the score "dynamic to say the least", praising the music for its appropriation within the gameplay. He concluded that the team have "craft[ed] an entertaining blend of musical tastes that everyone can get on board with". Tshepo Mokoena of The Guardian deemed the soundtrack "inaccessibly trendy at points, but varied enough". The album peaked at 11 on Billboard's Top Soundtracks charts in the week of 12 October 2013.

Volume 1: Original Music
| No. | Title | Writer(s) | Artist(s) | Length |
|---|---|---|---|---|
| 1. | "Welcome to Los Santos" | Michael W. Jackson; Woodrow Jackson III | Oh No | 2:34 |
| 2. | "Smokin' and Ridin'" | Bryan Sledge; Fredrick Jamel Tipton; Jason Martin; Christopher Steven "Brody" Brown; Larrance Dopson; Michael Cox, Jr.; Josh Wesley Groover | BJ the Chicago Kid featuring Freddie Gibbs and Problem | 3:32 |
| 3. | "Old Love / New Love" | George Lewis Jr.; Dennis Herring; D'Angelo Lacy | Twin Shadow | 3:53 |
| 4. | "Change of Coast" | Alan Daniel Palomo | Neon Indian | 3:12 |
| 5. | "Nine is God" | Nathan Williams | Wavves | 4:57 |
| 6. | "Bassheads" | Alan Maman; M. Jackson | Gangrene | 2:45 |
| 7. | "Stonecutters" | Steven Ellison | Flying Lotus | 4:18 |
| 8. | "High Pressure Dave" | Benjamin Miller; Jacob Duzsik; John Famiglietti; Jupiter Hoover-Keyes; Scott Carl Ryser | HEALTH | 3:15 |
| 9. | "What's Next?" | Dimitri Coats; Keith Morris | OFF! | 2:09 |
| 10. | "Garbage" | Tyler Okonma | Tyler, the Creator | 3:28 |
| 11. | "Nowhere to Go" | Ramona Maria Gonzales | Nite Jewel | 3:59 |
| 12. | "R - Cali" | Rakim Meyers; Chauncey Hollis; Kevin Moore, Jr.; Aston Matthews; Joey Fatts | ASAP Rocky | 2:19 |
| 13. | "Colours" | Joe Reeves; Darren Cullen | Age of Consent | 4:23 |
| 14. | "Hold Up" | Ezell Walter Gaines; Ermias Asghedom; Dopson; Brown; James Fauntleroy | Marion Band$ featuring Nipsey Hussle | 3:52 |
| 15. | "Life of a Mack" | Kossisko Konan; Joseph Waks | 100s | 3:24 |
| 16. | "The Set Up" | James Curd; Morgan Phalen | Favored Nations | 4:03 |
| 17. | "Don't Come Close" | Anand Wilder; Chris Keating | Yeasayer | 3:28 |
| 18. | "Sleepwalking" | Kamtin Mohager; James Nick Bailey; Rami Jrade; Ryan Ogren | The Chain Gang of 1974 | 3:38 |
| Total length: | | | | 63:17 |

Volume 2: The Score (Note: All songs written and composed by Tangerine Dream, Woody Jackson, The Alchemist and Oh No. All songs layered, mixed and arranged by DJ Shadow from the original interactive in-game score.)
| No. | Title | Length |
|---|---|---|
| 1. | "We Were Set Up" | 3:31 |
| 2. | "A Legitimate Business Man" | 2:57 |
| 3. | "A Haze of Patriotic Fervor" | 5:30 |
| 4. | "Los Santos at Night" | 1:43 |
| 5. | "North Yankton Memories" | 4:02 |
| 6. | "The Grip" | 3:10 |
| 7. | "Mr. Trevor Philips" | 4:25 |
| 8. | "A Bit of an Awkward Situation" | 4:42 |
| 9. | "No Happy Endings" | 5:19 |
| 10. | "His Mentor" | 1:27 |
| 11. | "(Sounds Kind of) Fruity" | 4:44 |
| 12. | "Minor Turbulence" | 4:33 |
| 13. | "Chop the Dog" | 4:11 |
| 14. | "A Lonely Man" | 3:32 |
| 15. | "You Forget a Thousand Things" | 3:36 |
| 16. | "Impotent Rage / Am I Being Clear Now?" | 2:08 |
| 17. | "Fresh Meat" | 4:03 |
| 18. | "Therapy and Other Hobbies" | 0:57 |
| 19. | "Rich Man's Plaything" | 4:06 |
| 20. | "The Agency Heist" | 3:22 |
| 21. | "Hillbilly Crank Dealers' Blues" | 5:19 |
| 22. | "Welcome to Los Santos (Outro)" | 1:11 |
| Total length: | | 78:40 |

Volume 3: The Soundtrack
| No. | Title | Artist | Length |
|---|---|---|---|
| 1. | "The Kill" | Flying Lotus featuring Niki Randa | 3:25 |
| 2. | "I Am a Madman" | Lee "Scratch" Perry | 5:48 |
| 3. | "Jasmine" | Jai Paul | 4:10 |
| 4. | "I Get Lifted" | George McCrae | 2:44 |
| 5. | "What You Wanna Do" | Kausion | 4:08 |
| 6. | "Can't Hardly Stand It" | Charlie Feathers | 2:48 |
| 7. | "Life of Crime" | The Weirdos | 2:19 |
| 8. | "Es Toy" | Mexican Institute of Sound | 3:15 |
| 9. | "Gabriel (Soulwax Mix)" | Joe Goddard featuring Valentina | 4:28 |
| 10. | "I'd Rather Be With You" | Bootsy Collins | 4:57 |
| 11. | "Hollywood Nights" | Bob Seger | 5:00 |
| 12. | "From Nowhere (Baardsen Remix)" | Dan Croll | 4:27 |
| 13. | "Say That Then" | Problem featuring Glasses Malone | 2:52 |
| 14. | "I Ain't Living Long Like This" | Waylon Jennings | 4:45 |
| 15. | "Nobody Move, Nobody Gets Hurt" | Yellowman | 3:43 |
| 16. | "All the Things She Said" | Simple Minds | 4:16 |
| 17. | "Harm in Change" | Toro y Moi | 3:59 |
| 18. | "This Mystic Decade" | Hot Snakes | 3:03 |
| 19. | "Mirror Maru" | Cashmere Cat | 4:02 |
| Total length: | | | 74:16 |

=== The Cinematographic Score — GTA 5 ===
The Cinematographic Score — GTA 5

Soundtrack album by Tangerine Dream
- Released: 24 March 2014
- Recorded: 2012–2013
- Studios: Eastgate Studios, in Vienna and Berlin
- Genre: Electronic
- Length: 63:50
- Label: Eastgate
- Producer: Edgar Froese

Tangerine Dream chronology
| Franz Kafka — The Castle (2013) | The Cinematographic Score — GTA 5 (2014) | Chandra: The Phantom Ferry Part II (2014) |

The Cinematographic Score — GTA 5 was released on 24 March 2014, limited to 2000 copies. The album was composed and produced by Tangerine Dream founder Edgar Froese, while his wife Bianca Acquaye provided the cover art and acted as executive producer. Froese agreed to work on the game despite his distaste for the medium, intrigued by Grand Theft Auto V's philosophy of "working against the establishment", describing it as "a social game".

Track listing
| No. | Title | Length |
|---|---|---|
| 1. | "Place of Conclusions" | 5:15 |
| 2. | "Streets of Fortune" | 4:54 |
| 3. | "Mission Possible" | 4:15 |
| 4. | "Downtown Los Santos" | 5:06 |
| 5. | "Blaine County Sunrise" | 5:26 |
| 6. | "Burning the Bad Seal" | 5:18 |
| 7. | "Beyond the Weakest Point" | 6:10 |
| 8. | "Sadness, Grief and Hope" | 4:38 |
| 9. | "Diary of a Robbery" | 5:36 |
| 10. | "Draw the Last Line Somewhere" | 6:13 |
| 11. | "The Dangerous Mile" | 5:42 |
| 12. | "Living on a Razor Edge" | 5:17 |
| Total length: | | 63:50 |

=== Welcome to Los Santos ===
Welcome to Los Santos

Soundtrack album by The Alchemist and Oh No
- Released: 14 April 2015 (Grand Theft Auto V); 21 April 2015 (Retail version)
- Genres: Hip-hop; synth-pop; dancehall
- Length: 54:51
- Labels: Rockstar Games; Mass Appeal
- Producers: The Alchemist; Josh Carter; Little Dragon; Oh No; Sinkane; Josh Werner

The Alchemist chronology
| FASH-ionably Late (2014) | Welcome to Los Santos (2015) | Israeli Salad (2015) |

Oh No chronology
| Animal Serum (2014) | Welcome to Los Santos (2015) | You Disgust Me (2015) |

Welcome to Los Santos (also known as The Alchemist and Oh No Present Welcome to Los Santos) was included with the Windows version of Grand Theft Auto V, which was released on 14 April 2015. The album was put onto a fictional in-game radio station called "The Lab" to fit with the rest of the in-game music. A retail version of the album was released on 21 April through Mass Appeal Records. David Jeffries of AllMusic felt that the album "captures the excitement of flipping the radio dial in the game". Pitchfork Media's Clayton Purdom praised the album's variety of artists and genres, calling it "music blooming out of a club you are supposed to want to go into". Andrew Matson of NPR spoke positively of most of the album's tracks, though felt that some were "unconsidered, and ... never jells as a result". The album peaked at 18 and 41 on Billboard's Top Soundtracks and R&B Albums charts, respectively, in the week of 9 May 2015.

Track listing
| No. | Title | Writer(s) | Producer(s) | Length |
|---|---|---|---|---|
| 1. | "Play It Cool" (Gangrene featuring Samuel T. Herring and Earl Sweatshirt) | Alan Maman; Michael W. Jackson; Herring; Thebe Neruda Kgositsile | The Alchemist | 3:53 |
| 2. | "Trouble" (Ab-Soul featuring Aloe Blacc) | Egbert Nathaniel Dawkins III; Herbert Anthony Stevens; M. Jackson; Woody Jackson III | Oh No | 3:45 |
| 3. | "Speedline Miracle Masterpiece" (Tunde Adebimpe featuring Sal P and Sinkane) | Ahmed Gallab; Maman; Babatunde Adebimpe; Josh Werner; W. Jackson III | The Alchemist; Werner; Sinkane | 4:10 |
| 4. | "Welcome to Los Santos" (MC Eiht and Freddie Gibbs featuring Kokane) | Aaron Tyler; Frederick Jamel Tipton; Jerry B. Long, Jr.; M. Jackson; W. Jackson III | Oh No | 3:51 |
| 5. | "K.Y.S.A." (Phantogram) | Maman; Josh Carter; Sarah Barthel | The Alchemist; Josh Carter; Bass Drum of Death^{[a]}; Jake Portrait^{[a]} | 4:20 |
| 6. | "Fast Life" (Vybz Kartel) | Adidja Azim Palmer; Werner; M. Jackson | Oh No; Josh Werner | 3:30 |
| 7. | "20's 50's 100's" (King Avriel featuring A$AP Ferg) | Avriel Epps; A$AP Ferg; Darold Ferguson; M. Jackson; W. Jackson III | Oh No; Evian Christ^{[a]} | 4:23 |
| 8. | "Lock & Load" (MNDR featuring Killer Mike) | Maman; Amanda Lucille Warner; Michael Render; Peter Wade Keusch; W. Jackson III | The Alchemist | 4:20 |
| 9. | "Born Bad" (Popcaan featuring Freddie Gibbs) | Andrae Hugh Sutherland; Tipton; Werner; M. Jackson | Oh No; Josh Werner | 3:28 |
| 10. | "California" (E-40 featuring Dâm-Funk and Ariel Pink) | Earl Stevens; M. Jackson; Monika James | Oh No | 3:55 |
| 11. | "Leave" (Wavves) | Maman; Joel Williams; Nathan Williams; Stephen Pope | The Alchemist | 3:15 |
| 12. | "Fetti" (Curren$y and Freddie Gibbs) | Maman; Tipton; Shante Scott Franklin; W. Jackson III | The Alchemist | 4:39 |
| 13. | "Wanderer" (Little Dragon) | Erik Oskar Bodin; Frederik Kallgren Wallin; Håkan Wilhelm Wirenstrand; Yukimi Nagano | Little Dragon | 4:36 |
| 14. | "Bad News" (Action Bronson and Danny Brown) | Maman; Ariyan Arslani; Daniel Sewell | The Alchemist | 2:46 |
| Total length: | | | | 54:51 |

Notes

- ^{^[a]}signifies an additional producer

=== Grand Theft Auto Online: Arena War (Official Soundtrack) ===
Grand Theft Auto Online: Arena War (Official Soundtrack)

Soundtrack album by HEALTH
- Released: 1 March 2019
- Genre: Video game music
- Length: 23:23
- Label: Rockstar Games
- Producers: Jacob Duzsik; John Famiglietti

HEALTH chronology
| Vol. 4: Slaves of Fear (2019) | Grand Theft Auto Online: Arena War (Official Soundtrack) (2019) | Disco4: Part I (2020) |

Grand Theft Auto Online: Arena War (Official Soundtrack) is a soundtrack album by American noise rock band Health consisting of original music from the Arena War DLC for the multiplayer mode Grand Theft Auto Online. The album was released on streaming services on 1 March 2019. All song names are stylised in uppercase. All tracks are composed and produced by Jacob Duzsik and John Famiglietti, except for "Slaves Of Fear (Arena War Remix)", written by Jacob Duzsik, John Famiglietti and Lars Stalfors, produced by Stalfors, with additional production by Dave Cerminara and Stint.

Track listing
| No. | Title | Length |
|---|---|---|
| 1. | "Bloodsport (World Domination)" | 2:45 |
| 2. | "Risk Of Death" | 1:59 |
| 3. | "War For The Blackened Earth" | 3:17 |
| 4. | "The Wheel" | 2:18 |
| 5. | "Slaves Of Fear" (Arena War Remix) | 3:33 |
| 6. | "Knightriders" | 2:48 |
| 7. | "Sunrise/Windshield" | 1:39 |
| 8. | "No God In Thunderdome" | 3:21 |
| 9. | "Arena War Theme" | 1:43 |
| Total length: | | 23:23 |

=== DāM-FunK Presents The Music of Grand Theft Auto Online Original Score ===
DāM-FunK Presents The Music of Grand Theft Auto Online Original Score

Soundtrack album by Dam-Funk
- Released: 15 December 2023
- Genre: Soundtrack
- Length: 56:40
- Label: Rockstar Games
- Producer: Dam-Funk

Dam-Funk chronology
| Above the Fray (2021) | DāM-FunK Presents The Music of Grand Theft Auto Online Original Score (2023) |

DāM-FunK Presents The Music of Grand Theft Auto Online Original Score features music featured in Grand Theft Auto V's multiplayer mode, Grand Theft Auto Online. It features songs from several artists, re-arranged and produced by Dam-Funk. The album was released digitally on 15 December 2023. All song names are stylised in uppercase.

Track listing
| No. | Title | Length |
|---|---|---|
| 1. | "Arena Wars" (featuring Health) | 3:37 |
| 2. | "The Contract – Mass" | 3:47 |
| 3. | "The Cayo Perico Heist I" (featuring &ME) | 4:29 |
| 4. | "Executives And Other Criminals" (featuring James Curd) | 4:16 |
| 5. | "Los Santos Drug Wars" (featuring Soulwax) | 2:58 |
| 6. | "The Contract – Space" | 4:31 |
| 7. | "Lowriders" (featuring Oh No) | 3:09 |
| 8. | "Bikers" (featuring Holy Fuck) | 4:18 |
| 9. | "Import/Export" (featuring Take a Daytrip) | 3:12 |
| 10. | "The Contract – The Journey" | 3:22 |
| 11. | "The Diamond Casino Heist" (featuring Nick Hook) | 4:12 |
| 12. | "The Cayo Perico Heist II" (featuring Rampa) | 3:04 |
| 13. | "Smuggler's Run" (featuring Show Me the Body) | 3:03 |
| 14. | "The Contract – House Call" | 4:39 |
| 15. | "The Contact – Smooth Kill" | 4:03 |
| Total length: | | 56:40 |

== Singles ==
=== Grand Theft Auto Online: The Cayo Perico Heist ===
On 18 December 2020, three singles were released by Rockstar alongside the Grand Theft Auto Online update The Cayo Perico Heist. The singles were released by various artists and contained music that was featured in the update.

List of singles
| No. | Title | Writer(s) | Length |
|---|---|---|---|
| 1. | "The Chocolate Conquistadors" (BadBadNotGood and MF Doom) | Alexander Sowinski; Alphonso Mizell; Chester A. Hansen; Daniel Dumile; Larry Mizell; Leland Whitty; Matthew Tavares | 7:01 |
| 2. | "1988" (Moodymann) | Kenneth Dixon | 1:27 |
| 3. | "Bim Bam Bam" (Kokoko!) | George Kranz | 3:37 |

=== GTA Online: The Contract ===
New music by Dr. Dre was added to Grand Theft Auto Online in its The Contract update in December 2021. In February 2022, the songs from the radio station were collectively released as a digital EP named GTA Online: The Contract through Aftermath Records and Interscope Records.

Tracklist
| No. | Title | Writer(s) | Producer | Length |
|---|---|---|---|---|
| 1. | "Gospel" (with Eminem) | Andre Young; Marshall Mathers III; Alvin Joiner; Farid Nassar; Thomas McCray; Vanessa Smith | Listen2KÖACH; Dr. Dre | 3:30 |
| 2. | "The Scenic Route" (with Rick Ross and Anderson .Paak) | Young; Brandon Anderson; William Leonard Roberts II; Darius Barnes; Francis Abel | Phonix; Dr. Dre | 3:02 |
| 3. | "Black Privilege" | Young; Roosevelt Harrell III; Jeremy Zumo Kollie; Jeffery N. Massey; Kion T. Williams; McKinley Jackson; Reginald Dozier; Tia Myrie; V. Smith | Bink!; Dr. Dre | 2:51 |
| 4. | "ETA" (with Snoop Dogg, Busta Rhymes, and Anderson .Paak) | Young; Calvin Cordozar Broadus Jr.; Trevor George Smith Jr.; Anderson; Joiner; Bryan Sledge; Jason Pounds; Marsha Ambrosius; Myron Lee Edwins | J. Lbs.; Dr. Dre | 3:57 |
| 5. | "Fallin Up" (with Thurz and Cocoa Sarai) | Young; Yannick Koffi; Myrie; Bernard Edwards Jr.; Byron Perry; Dwayne Abernathy Jr.; Kollie; Jeffery N. Massey; Sylvester Jordan; V. Smith | Dem Jointz; Dr. Dre | 3:23 |
| 6. | "Diamond Mind" (with Nipsey Hussle and Ty Dolla $ign) | Young; Airmiess Asghedom; Tyrone Griffin Jr.; Alan Hawkshaw; Alan Maman; Edwards; Abernathy; John Groover; Michael Cox Jr; Kollie; V. Smith | The Alchemist; Dr. Dre | 4:53 |
