= Lockah =

- Birth name: Tom Banks
- Also known as: 119 BPM; Donald Dust
- Born: 27 August 1985 (age 39)
- Origin: Aberdeen, Scotland
- Genres: Electronic
- Occupations: Record producer; DJ
- Years active: 2011–present
- Labels: Tuff Wax; Jeffree's; Mishka; Activia Benz; Donky Pitch; No Bad Days; Claptrap; Blaq Numbers

Tom Banks (born 27 August 1985), better known by his stage name Lockah, is a Scottish record producer and DJ from Aberdeen. He is a co-founder of the record label Tuff Wax. He resides in Brighton.

== Biography ==
In 2012, Lockah released an EP, titled When U Stop Feeling Like a Weirdo & Become a Threat. In that year, he also released an EP, titled Please Lockah, Don't Hurt 'Em. In 2013, he released an EP, titled Only Built 4 Neon Nites, as well as a collaborative EP with Taste Tester, titled Higher Learning. Lockah's first studio album, Yahoo or the Highway, was released in 2014. His second studio album, It Gets More Cloudy..., was released in 2015.

== Style and influences ==
His musical style has been described by Michael Cragg of The Guardian as "maximal, strangely textured day-glo dance music." Andriana Albert of The Line of Best Fit wrote: "One of the fascinating aspects of Banks' music is his ability to elicit melodies out of heavy-handed synth, sparse techno beats and trembling glistens of effects, all of which create the most strangely fantastic pop ballads."

== Discography ==
=== Studio albums ===
- Yahoo or the Highway (2014)
- It Gets More Cloudy... (2015)

=== EPs ===
- Aberdeen Truth Vol. 1 (2011)
- When U Stop Feeling Like a Weirdo & Become a Threat (2012)
- Please Lockah, Don't Hurt 'Em (2012)
- Only Built 4 Neon Nites (2013)
- Higher Learning (2013) (with Taste Tester)
- And Blue Brindle Too (2015)
- Checkmate Drums (2016) (as 119 BPM)
- Dazzle Ship (2017) (as Donald Dust)
- Fluorescent Music (2019) (as Donald Dust)
- Mouth Feel (2020) (as Donald Dust)

=== Singles ===
- "Now U Wanna (Offshore Remix)" (2013)
- "Aloe Дива" (2013) (with Pixelord)
- "If Loving U Is Wrong, I Don't Want to Be Wrong" (2014)
- "Sports Day" (2016)
- "Bike Tracks" (2016)
- "Mars R-Trax" (2018) (as Donald Dust)
- "Surf Domination" (2019) (as Donald Dust)
