= Crimewave (song) =

Single by Crystal Castles vs. Health

from the album Crystal Castles
- B-side: "XxzxcuZx Me"
- Released: August 13, 2007
- Recorded: 2006; The Exchange, Maidstone, England
- Genre: Electronic, chiptune
- Length: 4:18
- Label: Last Gang, PIAS
- Songwriters: Ethan Kath, Benjamin Miller, Jake Duzsik, John Famiglietti, Jupiter Keyes
- Producer: Ethan Kath

Crystal Castles singles chronology
| "Crimewave" (2007) | "Air War" (2007) |

Health singles chronology
| "Crimewave" (2007) | "Perfect Skin" (2008) |

Alternative cover
- French cover

Alternative cover
- Re-release cover

"Crimewave" is a song performed by Canadian experimental band Crystal Castles from Crystal Castles' self-titled debut album Crystal Castles. It was first released to music blogs in 2006. It was released physically on limited 7" vinyl on August 13, 2007 by Trouble Records, accompanied by the B-side "XxzxcuZx Me". The song is a re-working of the Health track of the same name written by the band members of Health for their eponymous debut album. It was re-written by Ethan Kath of Crystal Castles. Kath also produced the re-worked track. The song contains prominent electro and chiptune musical characteristics.

"Crimewave" achieved critical praise from most contemporary music critics. Critics complimented the song's originality and the emotion it brought to the electronic music scene. The single was accompanied by a music video upon its re-release in 2008.

== Background ==
Originally written and composed by the members of Health for their self-titled debut album, "Crimewave" was re-written and re-worked by Ethan Kath of Crystal Castles. The reworking significantly lengthened the original song while drastically altering the original vocals by Health.

== Composition ==
Musically, "Crimewave" builds from now-retro electroclash to a clattering mix of drums. The song consists of simple, catchy beats backed by lively video game sounds. "Crimewave" was composed as breezy, off-kilter electropop. Paul Lester from The Guardian likened "Crimewave" to the sound of Ian Curtis from Joy Division intoning blankly over Kraftwerk at their most synthetic. The song consists only of the following lyrics which are repeated vocally by Health in monotone throughout the song: "Eyes lit on sharp threats from dark lips, but lights press the soft skin to rough hands". "Crimewave" follows a chord progression of Em, C, Am, Bm, Em, C, G, Bm. "Crimewave" is set in the time signature of common time with an uptempo metronome of 121 beats per minute.

== Critical reception ==
Mehan Jayasuriya of PopMatters positively reviewed the "Crimewave" saying that it "might be a remix, but it sure as hell doesn't sound like one, a testament to the fact that keyboard wizard Ethan Kath manages to dress the song up in the Castles' trademark icy hedonism." Brian Reid of Prefix Magazine commented that "Crimewave" shows the depth of Crystal Castles as much more than just a dance-focused electro band. Reid went on to say: "On the tail end of 'Crimewave,' Kath lets vocal loop persist while knocking the bottom out of the track, resulting in a moment of startling beauty." Reid also said that "Crimewave" allows its listener to hear an emotive digital voice display a fragility usually lacking in electronic music. Colm Larkin of Clash reviewed the "brilliant track" saying: "Amongst a luxurious electro bassline, measured beat and achingly pretty electronic melodies, the robotic voice is scratched and split so the pleading words take on a monotonous, unknowable tone. The result combines cool electronic detachment with an undercurrent of torrid emotion, like hearing a robot plead for its life. Yet there's also that beat that helps you forget the blubbering tin man and want to dance to genuinely innovative and exciting electronic music that does have a heart." Andy Peterson of Contactmusic.com said that "Crimewave" made Crystal Castles "critically untouchable". The track was also highlighted as one of the album's strongest elements by Jamil Ahmad of musicOMH. The song was further deemed as one of the best dance tracks of the decade by Ricardo Baca of The Denver Post.

In October 2011, NME placed the Crystal Castles song at number 149 on its list of "150 Best Tracks of the Past 15 Years".

== Formats and listings ==
These are the formats and track listings of major single releases of "Crimewave":

- UK 7"
1. "Crimewave" (Ethan Kath, Benjamin Miller, Jake Duzsik, John Flamiglietti, Jupiter Keyes) – 4:15
2. "XxzxcuZx Me" (Alice Glass, Ethan Kath) – 1:58
- UK CD1"
1. "Crimewave" (Edit) – 2:58
2. "Crimewave" (Remix) – 4:26
3. "XxzxcuZx Me" – 1:58
- French 12"
1. "Crimewave (Radio Edit)" – 2:54
2. "Crimewave (Sinden Remix)" – 4:04
3. "Crimewave (LA Riots Remix)" – 4:50
4. "Crimewave (Keith Remix)" – 6:41
- Digital EP
1. "Crimewave (Radio Edit)" – 2:54
2. "Crimewave (Sinden Remix)" – 4:04
3. "Crimewave (LA Riots Remix)" – 4:50
4. "Crimewave (Keith Remix)" – 6:41
5. "Crimewave (LZRTAG Remix)" – 4:15
- UK CD2
1. "Crimewave (Gentile Radio Edit)" – 2:52
2. "Crimewave (LA Riots Remix)" – 4:48
3. "Crimewave (Keith Remix)" – 6:39
4. "Crimewave (Sinden Remix)" – 4:02
5. "Crimewave (Album Version)" – 4:18

== Credits and personnel ==
- Songwriting – Ethan Kath, Benjamin Miller, Jake Duzsik, John Famiglietti, Jupiter Keyes
- Production – Ethan Kath
- Instruments and programming – Ethan Kath
- Mixing – Ethan Kath, Lazar Nesic
- Mastering – Nils

== Song Syncs ==
"Crimewave" was used in Gossip Girl No.1 and features on its companion soundtrack, OMFGG – Original Music Featured on Gossip Girl No. 1, and was later featured on the in-game radio for the 2016 video game Watch Dogs 2.
