= Health//Disco =

Remix album by Health
- Released: May 27, 2008
- Genre: Noise rock, dance-punk
- Length: 52:44
- Label: Lovepump United

Health chronology
Health (2007)	Health//Disco (2008)	Get Color (2009)

Professional ratings
Aggregate scores
Source	Rating
Metacritic	82/100
Review scores
Source	Rating
AllMusic	3.5/5 stars
Cokemachineglow	80%
Drowned in Sound	9/10
musicOMH	3/5 stars
Now	4/5 stars
PopMatters	8/10
Pitchfork	8.0/10
Sputnikmusic	4/5
Uncut	4/5 stars
Under the Radar	7/10

Health//Disco is a remix album by American noise rock band Health. It features remixes of songs from their debut album Health.

== Track listing ==
CD edition
No.	Title	Length
1.	"Triceratops" (Acid Girls Rmx A)	5:03
2.	"Lost Time" (Pictureplane Rmx)	4:20
3.	"Triceratops" (Acid Girls Rmx B)	4:05
4.	"Crimewave" (Crystal Castles vs. Health)	4:32
5.	"Heaven" (Narctrax Rmx)	5:10
6.	"Problem Is" (Thrust Lab Rmx)	4:48
7.	"Triceratops" (CFCF Rmx)	3:35
8.	"Lost Time" (C.L.A.W.S. Rmx)	7:46
9.	"Tabloid Sores" (Nosaj Thing Rmx)	2:30
10.	"Heaven" (Pink Skull Rmx)	5:13
11.	"Perfect Skin" (Curses! Rmx)	5:46

Also included with the CD edition of the album are 5 data-only tracks that can be accessed through a computer.

1. "Zoothorns (Nastique Rmx)" - 5:21
2. "Tabloid Sores (Lovely Chords Rmx)" - 5:30
3. "Crimewave (Bearded Baby Re-Rmx)" - 3:50
4. "Glitter Pills (Toxic Avenger Rmx)" - 3:01
5. "The Power of Health (Captain Ahab Rmx)" - 5:08

Double LP edition
No.	Title	Length
1.	"Triceratops" (Acid Girls Rmx A)	5:03
2.	"Lost Time" (Pictureplane Rmx)	4:20
3.	"Triceratops" (Acid Girls Rmx B)	4:05
4.	"Crimewave" (David Wolf Re-edt)
5.	"Heaven" (Narctrax Rmx)	5:10
6.	"Problem Is" (Thrust Lab Rmx)	4:48
7.	"Triceratops" (CFCF Rmx)	3:35
8.	"The Power of Health" (Captain Ahab Rmx)	5:08
9.	"Tabloid Sores" (Nosaj Thing Rmx)	2:30
10.	"Tabloid Sores" (Lovely Chords Rmx)	5:30
11.	"Heaven" (Pink Skull Rmx)	5:13
12.	"Perfect Skin" (Curses! Rmx)	5:46
13.	"Lost Time" (C.L.A.W.S. Rmx)	7:46
14.	"Zoothorns" (Nastique Rmx)	5:21
15.	"Glitter Pills" (Matt Head Rmx)
