= Dark Rift (album) =

Studio album by Pictureplane
- Released: August 4, 2009
- Genre: Electronic
- Length: 55:08
- Label: Lovepump United Records
- Producer: Pictureplane

Pictureplane chronology
Turquoise Trail (2008)	Dark Rift (2009)	Thee Physical (2011)

Singles from Dark Rift
- 1. "Trance Doll / New Mind" Released: 2009

Dark Rift is a studio album by American electronic musician Pictureplane. It was released by Lovepump United Records on August 4, 2009. Music videos were created for "Trance Doll" and "Goth Star".

== Critical reception ==
Professional ratings
Review scores
Source	Rating
The A.V. Club	B
Pitchfork	7.3/10
PopMatters	8/10 stars
XLR8R	8.5/10

Zach Kelly of Pitchfork gave the album a 7.3 out of 10, saying, "the propulsive, strobe-streaked allegiance to the mainstream dance music of days gone by is ultimately the most admirable thing about Dark Rift." Shawn Reynaldo of XLR8R gave the album an 8.5 out of 10, saying, "Dark Rift proves that even DIY warehouse kids can make some first-rate dance music." Matthew Collins of PopMatters gave the album 8 stars out of 10, saying: "No song on Dark Rift may be especially fantastic, but no song on the album is anything less than great, either."

"Goth Star" was placed at number 79 on Pitchfork's "Top 100 Tracks of 2009" list.

== Track listing ==
No.	Title	Length
1.	"Solid Gold"	4:40
2.	"Trance Doll"	3:42
3.	"Boys in Blush"	3:36
4.	"Gang Signs"	4:35
5.	"5th Sun"	3:45
6.	"Goth Star"	3:19
7.	"Cyclical Cyclical (Atlantis)"	2:27
8.	"Time Teens"	3:18
9.	"Dark Rift"	5:15
10.	"New Mind"	3:38
11.	"Transparent Now (Thin Veil)"	4:08
12.	"Dimensional Rip III"	3:44
13.	"True Ruin"	9:01

== Personnel ==
Credits adapted from liner notes.

- Pictureplane – artwork, sounds, sampling
- Josh Bonati – mastering
