= Health::Disco2 =

Remix album by Health
- Released: June 22, 2010
- Genres: Noise rock, dance-punk
- Length: 52:57
- Label: Lovepump United

Health chronology
Get Color (2009)	Health::Disco2 (2010)	Max Payne 3 (2012)

Professional ratings
Review scores
Source	Rating
AllMusic	3.5/5 stars
Consequence of Sound	(C+)
Pitchfork Media	(7.8/10)
PopMatters	7/10 stars
URB	3.5/5 stars

Health::Disco2 is a remix album by American noise rock band Health. It features remixes of songs from the album Get Color by various artists, as well as one new track by Health.

== Track listing ==
1. "USA Boys" - 4:06
2. "Before Tigers (CFCF RMX)" - 4:39
3. "In Heat (Javelin RMX)" - 3:13
4. "Die Slow (Tobacco RMX)" - 4:07
5. "Severin (Small Black RMX)" - 3:56
6. "Before Tigers (Gold Panda RMX)" - 5:23
7. "Eat Flesh (Crystal Castles RMX)" - 3:59
8. "In Violet (Salem RMX)" - 3:00
9. "Nice Girls (Blondes RMX)" - 8:08
10. "Die Slow (Pictureplane RMX)" - 3:15
11. "Nice Girls (Little Loud RMX)" - 4:24
12. "Before Tigers (Blindoldfreak RMX)" - 4:52

Download-only bonus track version:

1. "In Violet (Hidden Cat RMX)" - 6:48
2. "Die Slow (Nastique RMX)" - 5:33
3. "Eat Flesh (Baron von Luxxury RMX)" - 4:06
4. "Die Slow (Nite Jewel RMX)" - 5:34
5. "Before Tigers (Rainbow Arabia RMX)" - 3:26
6. "We Are Water (Soft Encounter RMX)" - 3:44
7. "Death+ (Clipd Beaks RMX)" - 3:52
8. "Severin (Yip-Yip RMX)" - 3:13
9. "Death+ (Delivery RMX)" - 7:27
10. "In Heat (Rodion RMX)" - 6:02
11. "We Are Water (Azari & III RMX)" - 5:24
12. "Die Slow (Pink Stallone RMX)" - 6:20

== Charts ==
Chart (2010)	Peak position
US Top Dance Albums (Billboard)	22
