= Health (band) =

American industrial rock band

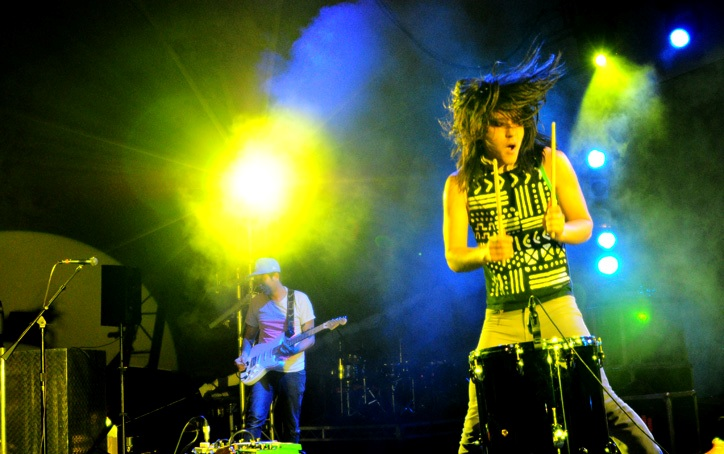
- Health performing at Becks Music Box in 2010

Background information
- Origin: Los Angeles, California, U.S.
- Genres: Industrial rock; Industrial metal; experimental rock (early); noise rock (early); indietronica (early)
- Years active: 2005–present
- Labels: Loma Vista; Trouble; Flemish Eye; No Pain In Pop; City Slang; Rome Plow
- Members: Benjamin Jared Miller; Jake Duzsik; John Famiglietti
- Past members: Jupiter Keyes
- Website: www.youwillloveeachother.com

Health (stylized in all caps) is an American industrial rock/metal band from Los Angeles, California. The band currently consists of drummer B.J. Miller, vocalist and guitarist Jake Duzsik, and bassist and producer John Famiglietti. It formerly also included Jupiter Keyes, who left in 2015. Originating from the Los Angeles underground experimental music community, they gained prominence with a remix of "Crimewave" by Crystal Castles before releasing a self-titled album in 2007.

Since then, they have released five albums: Get Color in 2009, Death Magic in 2015, Vol. 4: Slaves of Fear in 2019, Rat Wars in 2023, and Conflict DLC in 2025. The band also released the collaborative double album Disco4 in 2020 and 2022. They have contributed to a variety of video game soundtracks, including Max Payne 3, Cyberpunk 2077, Grand Theft Auto V, and Ultrakill.

== History ==
Health was founded after its singer Jake Duzsik met bassist John Famigletti, while Duzsik was working at the flagship Guitar Center in Los Angeles. They decided to form a band and enlisted guitarist Jupiter Keyes and drummer B.J. Miller, the former of which Duzsik knew from university. The band's name was chosen after the members agreed it should be an "everyday word"; when reviewing a long list of terms, "health" was the only one not taken. Their earliest work was inspired by experimentation in Los Angeles' underground music scene, with the intention of incorporating it into a more conventional band format.

=== Health ===
The band first gained a reputation through a remix of their song "Crimewave" by experimental electronic band Crystal Castles in August 2007. This was followed by their full-length debut a month later, which was recorded at L.A.'s noise/experimental venue, The Smell. At the time, Famiglietti stated in an interview that it "completely changes the tone of anything you want to record; makes a lot of things dark and beautiful". Spin praised the album, describing it as a "mind-numbing sonic overload only sauntered by Health's noisy predecessors."

Health released their first remix album, Health//Disco in 2008, which received favorable critical reception. That year, the band also opened for the rock band Nine Inch Nails on their Lights In The Sky tour; after they initially failed to gain the crowd's attention, Trent Reznor lent them his band's expensive LED equipment.

=== Get Color ===
To promote their 2009 album, Get Color, the band held a sweepstakes contest, in which the winner of a golden ticket was awarded a free trip to Los Angeles to go to Six Flags Magic Mountain with the band. Other prizes included locks of the band members' hair and posters autographed in blood. The album was praised by Pitchfork, which described it as an "unqualified success" with a "more delicate balance of noise and prettiness" than the debut album.

The following year, they released Disco2, which featured remixed tracks from Get Color in addition to some new original songs.

=== Max Payne 3 soundtrack ===
In 2012, Health composed the soundtrack for the Rockstar Games video game, Max Payne 3. The game's music director, Ivan Pavlovich stated that his team "wanted to give Max a sound that is really identifiable"; after they saw Health play "it was very clear that they were the ones". At the time, Duzsik stated that while it was a "surprise" to the band's fans, it was "fun to make music that was atypical for that sort of entertainment"; he later credited the soundtrack as forcing the band to "expand our musical palette" and head in a more electronic music-influenced direction.

The score was nominated for Best Score in a Game and "Tears" was nominated for Best Song in a Game at the 2012 Spike Video Game Awards. In 2013, this was followed by the track "High Pressure Dave" which appeared in Rockstar's Grand Theft Auto V.

=== Death Magic and Disco3 ===
Health's third album, Death Magic, was released on August 7, 2015, on Loma Vista Records. It signified a shift in the band's style, being more melodic and featuring greater usage of electronic elements than their previous work. The album's release was preceded by three singles: On April 23, 2015, Health premiered "New Coke" on SiriusXMU. The song "Stonefist" would be the second single released in June. On July 24, "Men Today" was released as the third track from the album. During the European Death Magic tour in 2015, Jupiter Keyes left the band.

Disco3 was released in the United States on February 17, 2017, on Loma Vista. Announced and released alongside a reverse telethon event on Facebook live, broadcast from the FunnyOrDie studios. Fans were asked to text a number in order to receive a call back from those involved, including B.J. and John. Later that year, the band covered New Order's "Blue Monday" for the film Atomic Blonde.

=== Slaves of Fear and further video game work ===
Health's fourth album, Vol. 4 :: Slaves of Fear, was released on February 8, 2019, on Loma Vista. The album was preceded by the singles "Slaves of Fear", released in December 2018, and "Feel Nothing", released through the Adult Swim Singles Program in January 2019.

Over the next year, Health also composed the soundtrack for GTA Online's Arena War update, and the song "Major Crimes" for the video game Cyberpunk 2077. "Major Crimes", alongside some other songs from the game, also appeared in its anime adaptation, Cyberpunk: Edgerunners, in 2022.

=== Disco4 series ===
On September 17, 2020, the band announced their fifth album, Disco4: Part I. Despite being called Disco4 "in the interest of continuity", it is not a part of Health's Disco series of remix albums, but a collection of original collaborations (with the exception of the album's lead single, "Cyberpunk 2020", which was composed solely by Health themselves). The album was released through Loma Vista on October 16, 2020. An accompanying remix album, Disco4+, was later released on April 2, 2021, on the band's Bandcamp page.

With both themselves and other artists not touring due to the COVID-19 pandemic, Health decided to use the opportunity to work on more collaborations, resulting in Disco4: Part II. After a teaser on May 3, 2021, the band released the first track off the album three days later, a song with Nine Inch Nails titled "Isn't Everyone". The full album was eventually released on April 8, 2022, featuring artists such as Poppy, Lamb of God, The Neighbourhood and Street Sects.

Just before the 10-year anniversary of the game's release in May 2022, an expanded anniversary edition of the Max Payne 3 soundtrack was announced for release later that year. This would also mark the album's first release on a vinyl record.

=== Rat Wars and collaborations ===
Health announced their next single "Hateful" as part of an April 2023 update to the video game Ultrakill. This was followed by the announcement of their sixth album, Rat Wars, with a release date of December 7, alongside two additional singles, "Children of Sorrow" and "Sicko". Thematically, the album was more "personal" than Health's previous work, being influenced by recent events in Duzsik's life. To promote its release, they published a Vampire Survivors-like game, Rat Wars Survivors, on itch.io themed around the album.

In 2024, the band collaborated with Bad Omens and Swarm for the track "The Drain" for the former's album Concrete Jungle [The OST], and released a reprised version of "Ashamed" from Rat Wars in collaboration with Lauren Mayberry. Additionally, they produced a music video for "Don't Try" with German video game studio rose-engine, using footage from the game Signalis. This was followed by the song "Mean" in 2025, a collaboration with Chelsea Wolfe.

=== Conflict DLC and R-Type ===
The band announced their next album, Conflict DLC, on September 11, 2025, alongside its first single, "Ordinary Loss". The music video for the track also incorporated announcements of an "addendum EP" to Rat Wars and a new R-Type remix album series. The R-Type series was released between February and April 2026.

== Musical style ==
Health's musical style has variously been described as industrial rock, electronic rock, experimental rock, and electro-industrial. Having origins in Los Angeles' experimental scene, the band has also been classified as noise rock, though Duzsik has stated that even its earlier work would not be categorised as such by "purists". He has described the band as a "primitive soundscape", influenced by sci-fi movies and the imagery of a dystopic future.

At the time of its first record, the band was referred to as creating noise music with "raw synth, haunting monotone vocals, and drum[s]." The band used a "Zoothorn", a permutation of microphone and guitar pedal and an occasional atonal sound without a symmetrical structure. With their third and fourth albums, Death Magic and Vol. 4: Slaves of Fear, Health shifted their style, incorporating more electronic elements and a closer adherence to a standard song structure, and taking greater inspiration from metal and industrial music. Famigletti has credited this to the innovation in the electronic scene at the time, stating that he found the resulting music to have "sheer power" that made it "orders of magnitude bigger" than its precedents.

Lyrically, the band described its tracks as "purposely kept vague for the listener", with the vocals imbuing "an even, unaffected feel. A softness, like a Zombies melody, or even a Gregorian chant". In an interview, Duzsik called them "direct", with a lack of simile or metaphor, describing his songwriting process as "therapeutic" and "akin to sad-ass slam poetry".

== Members ==
Current members

- Jake Duzsik – vocals, rhythm guitar (2005–present)
- John Famiglietti – bass, pedals, electronics (2005–present)
- B.J. Miller – drums (2005–present)

Live members

- Justin McKinney – lead guitar (2026–present)

Past members

- Jupiter Keyes – lead guitar, synthesizers (2005–2015)

== Discography ==
Studio albums

- Health (2007)
- Get Color (2009)
- Death Magic (2015)
- Vol. 4: Slaves of Fear (2019)
- Rat Wars (2023)
- Conflict DLC (2025)

Remix and collaborative albums

- Health//Disco (2008)
- Health::Disco2 (2010)
- Disco3 (2017)
- Disco4 (2020 and 2022)
- R-Type series (2026)

EPs

- Elphaba/HEALTH Split EP (2005)
- Dimensions In Noise (2009)
- Addendum (2026)
