= Death Magic =

Studio album by Health
- Released: August 7, 2015
- Genres: Industrial; EBM; synthpop; electropunk; noise rock
- Length: 39:30
- Label: Loma Vista
- Producers: Andrew Dawson; The Haxan Cloak; Justin Raisen; Lars Stalfors

Health chronology
Max Payne 3 (2012)	Death Magic (2015)	Disco3 (2017)

Singles from Death Magic
- 1. "New Coke" Released: April 24, 2015; 2. "Stonefist" Released: June 12, 2015; 3. "Men Today" Released: July 24, 2015

Death Magic is the third studio album by American noise rock band Health. It was released by Loma Vista Recordings on August 7, 2015, six years after the band's previous album, Get Color.

== Background and recording ==
After their last main album Get Color in 2009, Health was hired by Rockstar Games to work on the soundtrack for Max Payne 3. During the production of that album, they refined their production style; this combined with lengthy touring and "perfectionist" tendencies lead to a hiatus from non-soundtrack work.

The band intended to make a "modern rock record" driven by sonic experimentation and distinct from their previous work. Inspired by their soundtrack work and their Disco remix albums, they decided to take their next album in a more electronically-influenced direction, being partially inspired by genres such as intelligent dance music and artists such as Burial. However, the prevalence of instrumental passages on Max Payne lead the band to avoid including many in Death Magic.

They initially intended to produce with Rockstar's Woody Jackson, but eventually worked with Andrew Dawson, who had produced albums for Kanye West. Additionally, some tracks were produced by British electronic musician The Haxan Cloak and Lars Stalfors.

== Composition ==
Death Magic features more electronic instrumentation than Health's earlier work. It was characterised by reviewers as melding Health's previous noise rock with greater elements of melody and pop music-esque composition.

== Reception ==
Professional ratings
Aggregate scores
Source	Rating
Metacritic	73/100
Review scores
Source	Rating
AllMusic	3.5/5 stars
The A.V. Club	A−
Clash	8/10
Consequence of Sound	C
NME	8/10
The Observer	2/5 stars
Pitchfork	7.8/10
PopMatters	7/10 stars
Sputnikmusic	4.2/5

Death Magic received a score of 73 out of 100 on review aggregator Metacritic based on twenty-two critics' reviews, indicating "generally favorable" reception. Kevin Warwick of The A.V. Club praised its "electronic and industrial mystique", describing the album as "injected with a serum of growth hormones". PopMatters's Colin Fitzgerald said it was a "more open and expressive version" of Health, and Jordan Bassett of NME said that band "finally know[s] what they want".

Pitchfork's T. Cole Rachel called it a "bold, albeit occasionally jarring, step forward", saying that the more vulnerable tone in tracks like "Life" was "exhilarating and perverse". Clash magazine called the "battle between melody and noise" "fascinating". Rudy K. of Sputnikmusic praised Duzsik's "lighthouse"-like voice, stating that his vocals' newfound prominence was a "smart choice".

AllMusic's Heather Phares praised the album, but noted that fans of the band's earlier work could be "disappointed by the preponderance of hooks and emotion". Reviewer Adam Kivel of Consequence of Sound described the album as having a "sleeker focus" but the percussion as "sapped of strength and energy". In a more negative review by The Observer, Paul Mardles wrote that Death Magic was "dated" and "attention-seeking" and called Health "eternal sixth-formers – disgruntled and as if unsure what it is they want to say".

== Track listing ==
No.	Title	Writer(s)	Producer(s)	Length
1.	"Victim"	Jacob Duzsik; John Famiglietti; Jupiter Keyes; Bobby Krlic	The Haxan Cloak; Lars Stalfors^{[a]}	2:00
2.	"Stonefist"	Benjamin Miller; Duzsik; Famiglietti; Keyes; Stalfors	Stalfors; Andrew Dawson^{[a]}	3:24
3.	"Men Today"	Miller; Duzsik; Famiglietti; Keyes	Dawson; Stalfors^{[a]}	2:03
4.	"Flesh World (UK)"	Miller; Duzsik; Famiglietti; Keyes; Stalfors	Stalfors; Dawson^{[b]}	3:54
5.	"Courtship II"		Dawson; Stalfors^{[b]}	3:35
6.	"Dark Enough"	Miller; Duzsik; Famiglietti; Keyes; Stalfors	Stalfors; Dawson^{[b]}	3:42
7.	"Life"	Miller; Duzsik; Famiglietti; Keyes; Stalfors; Dawson; Justin Raisen	Stalfors; Dawson^{[a]}; Raisen^{[a]}	3:53
8.	"Salvia"	Miller; Duzsik; Famiglietti; Keyes; Stalfors	Dawson; Stalfors	1:48
9.	"New Coke"	Miller; Duzsik; Famiglietti; Keyes; Stalfors	Stalfors; Dawson^{[b]}	3:39
10.	"L.A. Looks"	Duzsik; Famiglietti; Keyes; Stalfors; Amanda Warner	Stalfors	3:24
11.	"Hurt Yourself"	Miller; Duzsik; Famiglietti; Keyes	Dawson; Stalfors^{[b]}	4:10
12.	"Drugs Exist"	Duzsik; Famiglietti; Keyes; Stalfors	Dawson; Stalfors^{[b]}	3:52
Total length:				39:30

Notes

- ^{^a} signifies a co-producer
- ^{^b} signifies an additional producer

== Personnel ==
Credits adapted from the liner notes of Death Magic.

=== Health ===
- Jacob Duzsik
- John Famiglietti
- Jupiter Keyes
- Benjamin Miller

=== Additional personnel ===
- The Haxan Cloak – production (track 1)
- Lars Stalfors – co-production (tracks 1, 3); production (tracks 2, 4, 6, 7, 9, 10); additional production (tracks 5, 8, 11, 12); mixing (all tracks)
- Andrew Dawson – co-production (tracks 2, 7); production (tracks 3, 5, 8, 11, 12)
- Justin Raisen – co-production (track 7)
- Joe LaPorta – mastering
- John Famiglietti – art direction
- Andrew Pham – design

== Charts ==
Chart (2015)	Peak position
US Heatseekers Albums (Billboard)	5
US Top Alternative Albums (Billboard)	24
US Indie Store Album Sales (Billboard)	23
