= Get Color =

Studio album by Health
- Released: September 8, 2009
- Genre: Noise rock; electronic
- Length: 32:53
- Label: Lovepump United
- Producer: Health

Health chronology
Health//Disco (2008)	Get Color (2009)	Health::Disco2 (2010)

Singles from Get Color
- 1. "Die Slow" Released: 2009

Get Color is the second studio album by American electronic noise rock band Health. It was released on Lovepump United on September 8, 2009. It received generally favorable reviews from critics. It peaked at number 17 on the Billboard Heatseekers Albums chart, as well as number 43 on the Independent Albums chart. As of 2015, it has sold 11,000 copies.

== Critical reception ==
Professional ratings
Aggregate scores
Source	Rating
Metacritic	79/100
Review scores
Source	Rating
AllMusic	4/5 stars
The A.V. Club	B
Chart Attack	4/5
Consequence of Sound	B−
Drowned in Sound	8/10
Pitchfork	7.4/10
PopMatters	8/10 stars
The Skinny	4/5 stars
State	3/5
XLR8R	9/10

At Metacritic, which assigns a weighted average score out of 100 to reviews from mainstream critics, the album received an average score of 79, based on 18 reviews, indicating "generally favorable reviews".

Jason Lymangrover of AllMusic gave the album 4 stars out of 5, saying, "As well as being larger, the aspect that separates Get Color from the band's debut of fractured near-instrumentals is that the tracks on board actually feel like fully realized songs, rather than sketched ideas." Joe Colly of Pitchfork gave the album a 7.4 out of 10, commenting that "if HEALTH can continue to find some deeper meaning behind their very impressive musicianship, they might be onto something great."

== Track listing ==
All tracks are written by Health (Jake Duzsik, John Famiglietti, Jupiter Keyes, and BJ Miller).

No.	Title	Length
1.	"In Heat"	1:47
2.	"Die Slow"	3:12
3.	"Nice Girls"	3:10
4.	"Death+"	2:39
5.	"Before Tigers"	3:26
6.	"Severin"	4:09
7.	"Eat Flesh"	4:02
8.	"We Are Water"	4:15
9.	"In Violet"	6:14
Total length:		32:53

== Personnel ==
Credits adapted from liner notes.

- Health – performance, production, engineering, mixing
- Manny Nieto – co-production, engineering, mixing
- Shane Smith – additional engineering
- Jake Friedman – executive production
- Nick Zampiello – mastering
- Rob Gonnella – mastering

== Charts ==
Chart (2009)	Peak position
US Heatseekers Albums (Billboard)	17
US Independent Albums (Billboard)	43
