= Vol. 4: Slaves of Fear =

Studio album by Health
- Released: February 8, 2019
- Genres: Noise rock; industrial metal; EBM; synthpunk
- Length: 38:17
- Label: Loma Vista
- Producer: Lars Stalfors

Health chronology
Disco3 (2017)	Vol. 4: Slaves of Fear (2019)	Grand Theft Auto Online: Arena War (Official Soundtrack) (2019)

Vol. 4: Slaves of Fear (stylized as VOL4 :: SLAVES OF FEAR) is the fourth studio album by American noise rock band Health. It was released on February 8, 2019 through Loma Vista Recordings. The album was largely praised by critics.

== Recording and composition ==
Compared to the band's previous work, Slaves of Fear was described by critics as featuring more elements of industrial music, and being thematically more dismal. Vocalist Jake Duzsik called it "darker, heavier, [and] dirtier". Sputnikmusic described it as "Death Magic if Trent Reznor had gotten a hold of it", stating that its "sterile and cold simplicity" paralleled industrial bands during the 1980s and 90s.

Bassist John Famigletti described the album as being influenced by amateur artists on SoundCloud, stating that "NC-17" was derived from the "unfinished" work found on that platform, and Duzsik additionally stated it took inspiration from other artists Health had recently collaborated with. The tracks were produced by Lars Stalfors; Famigletti stated he enjoyed the collaboration, calling him "artist focused" but someone who "will get you to finish what you’re working on".

After the album's initial completion in 2018, the band decided to take extra time to revisit and tweak the tracks, with Famigletti stating that he "[didn't] know if it's the best way to make a record, but it's really awesome".

== Reception ==
Professional ratings
Aggregate scores
Source	Rating
Metacritic	70/100
Review scores
Source	Rating
AllMusic	4/5 stars
DIY	4/5 stars
Drowned in Sound	8/10
Exclaim!	7/10
NME	3/5 stars
Pitchfork	3.4/10
Sputnikmusic	4.5/5 stars
Under the Radar	7/10

Slaves of Fear received a score of 70 out of 100 on review aggregator Metacritic based on twelve critics' reviews, indicating "generally favorable" reception. Under the Radar's Dom Gourlay described it as making "despair and desolation the band’s calling card", and Exclaim! stated that the "grimness of the lyrics works". Heather Phares of AllMusic said that "there's something special about its empathy and honesty". Matthew Davies Lombardi of DIY described it as being "relentless, dramatic and cinematic as [the band] dare to be", and Simon K. of Sputnikmusic said it was "densely packed with eerie clouds that loom over the haunting melancholia", making it the band's "most cohesive album yet".

Although he called it a "good album", Jordan Bassett of NME described its "pounding sonic template" as being "diminished through its constancy", and Drowned in Sound's Gavin Miller stated that the album "isn’t perfect, but then I’m not sure it’s trying to be". Pitchfork reviewer Sascha Geffen was more negative, perceiving the songs as having "no fight" and Health as seeming "content to throw up their hands and just die".

== Track listing ==
No.	Title	Length
1.	"Psychonaut"	2:24
2.	"Feel Nothing"	2:59
3.	"God Botherer"	2:23
4.	"Black Static"	3:05
5.	"Loss Deluxe"	3:18
6.	"NC-17"	3:08
7.	"The Message"	2:32
8.	"Rat Wars"	2:32
9.	"Strange Days (1999)"	3:24
10.	"Wrong Bag"	2:46
11.	"Slaves of Fear"	4:53
12.	"Decimation"	4:53

== Charts ==
Chart (2019)	Peak position
US Heatseekers Albums (Billboard)	6
