= Ultrakill =

Upcoming video game

- The cover art for Ultrakill
- Developer: Arsi "Hakita" Patala
- Publisher: New Blood Interactive
- Producer: Dave Oshry
- Designer: Arsi "Hakita" Patala
- Programmers: Arsi "Hakita" Patala; Heckteck; PITR
- Artists: Andrei Mishchenko; BigRockBMP; Francis Xie; Victoria Holland
- Writers: Arsi "Hakita" Patala; Jacob H.H.R.
- Composers: Arsi "Hakita" Patala; Meganeko; Keygen Church; Health; King Gizzard & the Lizard Wizard; Vylet Pony
- Engine: Unity
- Platform: Windows
- Release: 3 September 2020 (early access)
- Genre: First-person shooter
- Mode: Single-player

Ultrakill is an upcoming first-person shooter game developed by Arsi "Hakita" Patala and published by New Blood Interactive. It was released on Steam through early access for Microsoft Windows on 3 September 2020. The game uses retro-style graphics reminiscent of video games from the early PlayStation consoles and combines modern movement mechanics like those of Titanfall and Doom Eternal with gameplay elements from action games like Devil May Cry.

== Gameplay ==
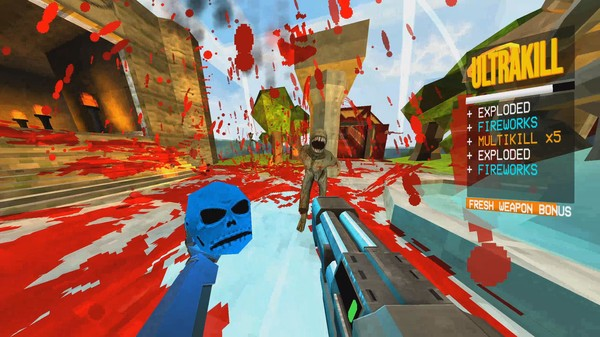
The style meter (to the right) dictates how stylishly the player defeats enemies. Certain "style bonuses" can be awarded for specific actions (like parrying).

Ultrakill is a fast-paced first-person shooter with an emphasis on movement and stylish techniques. The player must make their way through an interpretation of Dante's layers of Hell, with three acts each made up of three layers being divided into multiple levels. As of September 2026, only Act I and Act II have been fully released, with only the first two layers of Act III being available.

The player battles enemies using an arsenal of weapons, having a primary and alternate attack, and various robotic arms. These have unique interactions with each other, evoking the combination attacks of games like Devil May Cry. Many of the advanced techniques in the game are a result of combining various elements of the player's arsenal. To encourage aggressive gameplay, the player can heal by absorbing the blood of enemies through close-range combat or parrying enemy attacks. The player's performance is judged by a "style meter", similar to games such as Devil May Cry. The style meter rewards the player for performing advanced and flashy moves, as well as encouraging aerial maneuvering and quickly swapping between weapons.

At the end of each level, the player's style ranking is combined with time taken and number of kills to determine a letter grade for that run. Achieving an S rank in all three categories without dying throughout that run will earn the player a P (Perfect) rank, the highest possible rank for a level.

In addition to the main campaign, Ultrakill provides various secret levels parodying other video game genres. The game has an endless survival mode called "The Cyber Grind" where players can compete against other players' high scores, and a sandbox mode in which the player can spawn enemies and various objects. Achieving a P rank in all levels of an act allows the player to access the act's "prime sanctum", each containing a secret boss fight.

== Plot ==
=== Before the Game ===
Long before the events of the game, God created humanity, hoping they would follow his word as law. However, he couldn’t create a mind without free will, wasting countless cycles trying. In a fit of anger toward his creation, god made Hell, but once he realized what he had done, it was irreversible. At some point in between his disappearance and the creation of Hell, Lucifer questioned God's rationale for creating hell; stating:

FATHER, WHY ETERNAL TORMENT? IS IT NOT CRUEL? IS TORTURE UNENDING TRULY A FATE FIT FOR A FOOL?

For questioning God's authority, Lucifer was thrown into Hell. God would come to regret this too, weeping from his mistake. Wracked with guilt and regret, he eventually disappeared, leaving Heaven without a ruler.

Far into the future, humanity became extinct from unknown causes after a centuries-long conflict known as the Final War, followed by a brief period called the New Peace. The Final War triggered an arms race that led to the development of blood-powered machines. Blood contains supernatural power in ULTRAKILL, as discussed in a lore book in the seventh layer, Violence. Blood allows machines, and anything that can circulate it, to practically be injected with consciousness. This development made human soldiers obsolete, and while many were happy to return home, they found all national resources dumped into the war. Eventually, this caused a climate disaster referred to in game as the "Long Night" that blotted out the Sun, ending the war and depriving humanity of resources. The war ended due to the Final Machines being created, Earthmovers, who were powering partially off due to the lack of Solar power. It is implied that the Final War was a direct evolution of World War I, where it was instead dragged out for about 200 years.

During the New Peace, humans discovered Hell and began expeditions to seek new resources. During this time, they learn that Hell has both Sentience and Superintelligence. Following this discovery, they attempt to cancel their expeditions and seal off Hell, but Mankind can not; and they go extinct.

With Earth's blood supplies exhausted, several blood-powered machines descended into Hell in search of sustenance. Among them was V1, a prototype built shortly before the end of the Final War, capable of repairing itself by absorbing blood during combat.

=== During the Game ===
On its journey, V1 fought husks—physical forms of damned souls—along with demons, angels, and rival machines as it ventured deeper into Hell’s layers. In the Limbo layer, V1 fights V2, another prototype designed during the New Peace with stronger armor instead of blood absorption, who escapes after being defeated. After vanquishing the husk of King Minos in the Lust layer, the first act culminates in a fight in Gluttony against the archangel Gabriel, the newly appointed Judge of Hell. Defeated by V1, Gabriel was declared a traitor by the Council of Heaven, who ruled in God’s absence, stripping him of his holy light and giving him only 24 hours to destroy V1.

V1 continues its descent into Hell, having a rematch with V2 in the Greed layer that ends in V2's death, and killing the Leviathan in the Wrath layer. Gabriel returns at the end of the second act in Heresy, enraged by his earlier defeat. This time, though he is beaten again, Gabriel feels relief rather than anger, recognizing V1 as his first true challenge. Reflecting on his losses, he concludes that the Council of Heaven had strayed in God’s absence, manipulating him for their own ends. Resolute in his independence, he slaughters the council members and displays one of their heads to Heaven’s citizens, knowingly sealing his fate.

V1 continues its massacre in the Violence layer, where it defeats the Minotaur, clashing with the Guttermen—the first blood-powered war machines—and their rivals, the Guttertanks, whose rivalry ignited the machine arms race, and eventually destroys the Earthmover, a massive war machine from the Final War’s end that triggered the climate catastrophe. It is implied from the date of V1's firmware and the timeline of the story that V1 was the direct counter to the Earthmovers, which is further supported by the style bonus they achieve after killing them: +Raison d'être (Reason for being). After that, V1 enters the Fraud layer, where it faces Providences (akin to Seraphs) and Powers, angels venturing into Hell in search of Gabriel after his massacre of the Council of Heaven. During its time in Fraud, Hell distorts V1’s perception and fear of death, most vividly through the Mirror Reaper, a husk lurking in mirrors that briefly imitates V1 before being destroyed. Ultimately, V1 slays the winged demon Geryon, before awakening inside a theater, with all of the demons and angels as props backstage before leaving.

== Development ==
Arsi Patala, who goes by the name Hakita, began development in February 2018. An early demo of Ultrakill was released in August 2019, with the game being picked up by New Blood Interactive in May 2020. It released through early access in September of that year.

On 24 February 2025, the game received a near-complete overhaul in the "ULTRA_REVAMP" update, featuring new graphics for most layers, technical improvements, new "Encore" levels featuring different themes for each layer (such as the industrial setting of the Prelude having been frozen over), and music from King Gizzard & the Lizard Wizard. The technical updates were done in preparation for the development of the Fraud layer, with the developers stating in a Steam blog post that "much of ULTRAKILL's codebase was very messy, especially the enemy behaviors. So much so that not only would it make it harder for us (and modders) to work on the game in the future, but even for us to do some of the new things we wanted to do in Layer 8".

== Reception ==
Ultrakill has been praised for its movement mechanics and authenticity towards earlier arena shooters and first-person shooters. Christopher Livingston of PC Gamer described Ultrakill as faster and "even more metal than Doom Eternal" and commended the game for its verticality. It was also described as "[moving] like turbo Doom Eternal", in another PC Gamer article by Dominic Tarason, who noted that it "looks like a PSX game". It was also reviewed by Peter Glasgowski of TheGamer, who wrote that "...Ultrakill ticked off every box for me." On 15 May 2024, the game had achieved 100,000 Steam reviews with a 98% approval rating.

On 8 December 2022, Ultrakill gained official controller rumble support, under the guise of being sex toy support. Its developer released an official mod called UKbutt, adding support for a plugin called buttplug.io. The mod was created by Ultrakill programmer PITR and buttplug.io lead Kyle "qDot" Machulis. New Blood CEO Dave Oshry remarked that "at no point when originally testing or discussing the game with Hakita or anyone at [New Blood] were any of us like 'they're gonna want sex'." The mod was met with positive user reviews.
