= Health (Health album) =

Studio album by Health
- Released: September 18, 2007
- Genre: Noise rock
- Length: 28:42
- Label: Lovepump United

Health chronology
Health (2007)	Health//Disco (2008)

Singles from Health
- 1. "Perfect Skin" Released: February 2008; 2. "Heaven" Released: March 2008; 3. "Triceratops / Lost Time" Released: May 18, 2008; 4. "// M \\" Released: July 2008

Professional ratings
Review scores
Source	Rating
AllMusic	4/5 stars
Drowned in Sound	(8/10)
NME	4/5 stars
Pitchfork Media	(7.9/10)

Health is the debut album by American noise rock band Health. The album was recorded at the Los Angeles club The Smell.

In 2014, NME listed the album as one of the "101 Albums to Hear Before You Die," where it ranked 68th.

== Track listing ==
No.	Title	Length
1.	"Heaven"	2:37
2.	"Girl Attorney"	0:36
3.	"Triceratops"	3:14
4.	"Crimewave"	2:04
5.	"Courtship"	0:56
6.	"Zoothorns"	2:48
7.	"Tabloid Sores"	2:50
8.	"/ / M \ \"	3:26
9.	"Glitter Pills"	3:38
10.	"Perfect Skin"	4:21
11.	"Lost Time"	2:12
