= Street Sects =

American industrial punk band

- Origin: Austin, Texas, U.S.
- Genres: Industrial; punk; noise; plunderphonics
- Years active: 2013–present
- Labels: The Flenser
- Members: Leo Ashline; Shaun Ringsmuth
- Past members: Michael Lauden
- Website: streetsects.bandcamp.com

Street Sects is an American experimental band from Austin, Texas formed in 2013, composed of vocalist Leo Ashline and multi-instrumentalist Shaun Ringsmuth. Their style is extremely abrasive, characterised by industrial rhythms, use of screamed vocals, samples of both noise and synthesizers, and nihilistic lyrics. Following two EPs released in 2014, the duo's debut album End Position was released in 2016 on The Flenser to generally positive reviews.

== History ==
In 2013, in the wake of struggling with addiction for thirteen years, vocalist Leo Ashline formed Street Sects with his friend, multi-instrumentalist Shaun Ringsmuth, in order to produce extreme, experimental music addressing the negative aspects of life. In 2014, they self-released the first two EPs for the planned Gentrification: A Serial Album pentalogy: The Morning After the Night We Raped Death (February 4) and Broken Windows, Sunken Ceilings (July 15). On November 18 they also released the song "Things Will Be Better in California" which is a composition built from Spill/Fill, a collection of samples by Wreck and Reference from their 2014 album Want. All of these works were produced by the duo, mastered by James Plotkin, and illustrated by A.J. Garces Bohmer based on concepts by Ashline.

Street Sects' debut studio album End Position was released on September 16, 2016, through The Flenser to generally positive reviews. It was mixed and mastered by Machines with Magnets in Providence, Rhode Island. The album's title is based on a lyric from I See a Darkness by Will Oldham.

== Musical style ==
On their Bandcamp, Street Sects place their work within the categories of electronic, noise, punk, hardcore, industrial, sample-based, power electronics and rock. Their label, The Flenser, described their music as "a feverish marriage between industrial music and punk rock" ... "utilizing frantic, uncompromising rhythms and a variety of nightmarish samples". Their style was addressed by various critics in reviews of End Position, which were generally positive. Adam Devlin of Tiny Mix Tapes described it as a harsh noise industrial hammer punk album", noting that "Shaun Ringsmuth is an aural sculptor of rare form, mixing industrial rhythms made of machine gun parts and bursting crash cymbals with psychedelic, transgressive melodies of alien origin". Rolling Stone recommended the duo to fans of Big Black, Youth Code and Agoraphobic Nosebleed, describing their music as a "lean, murderous blend of synths, samples, pained vocals and industrial rhythms" featuring "nightmarish noise, punk and industrial punchouts". Tristan Jones of Sputnikmusic wrote: "Street Sects combine dirty synths with traces of noisecore and industrial piss, underscored with thoughts of suicide and misanthropy." Dæv Tremblay of Can This Even Be Called Music? called their music "hardcore plunderphonics". Stephen Proski of New Noise Magazine praised the interplay between Ringsmuth's sophisticated musical structures and Leo Ashline's (screamed) vocals, which he called "intimate and vehement".

== Members ==
- Leo Ashline – vocals, production (2013–present)
- Shaun Ringsmuth – instruments, samples, production (2013–present)
- Michael Lauden – guitar, drums, production (2019)

== Discography ==
Studio albums

Title	Album details
End Position	Released: September 16, 2016; Label: Flenser Records; Formats: CD, LP, digital download
The Kicking Mule	Released: October 26, 2018; Label: Flenser Records; Formats: CD, LP, digital download, cassette
Dry Drunk	Released: August 15, 2025; Label: Compulsion Records; Formats: Digital download
Full Color Eclipse	Released: August 15, 2025; Label: Compulsion Records; Formats: Digital download; Note: Street Sects are credited as Street Sex.

EPs

- Gentrification I: The Morning After the Night We Raped Death (2014)
- Gentrification II: Broken Windows, Sunken Ceilings (2014)
- Rat Jacket (2017)
- Gentrification III: Death and Displacement (2019)
- Gentrification IV: Suspended from Gallery Rails (2019)
- Gentrification V: Whitewashed (2022)

Splits

- Street Sects / Portrayal of Guilt (2018)
- Street Sects / Curse (2018)

Singles

- "Things Will Be Better in California" (2014)
- "And I Grew Into Ribbons" (2016)
- "Featherweight Hate" (2016)
- "Blacken the Other Eye" (2017)
- "Things Will Be Better In Hell" (2018)
- "In For a World of Hurt" (2018)
- "Still Between Lovers" (2018)
- "The Drifter" (2018)
- "Fourteen Frames" (featuring Nick Sadler & LINGUA IGNOTA) (2019)
- "X Amount" (2022)
