= Crystal Castles discography =

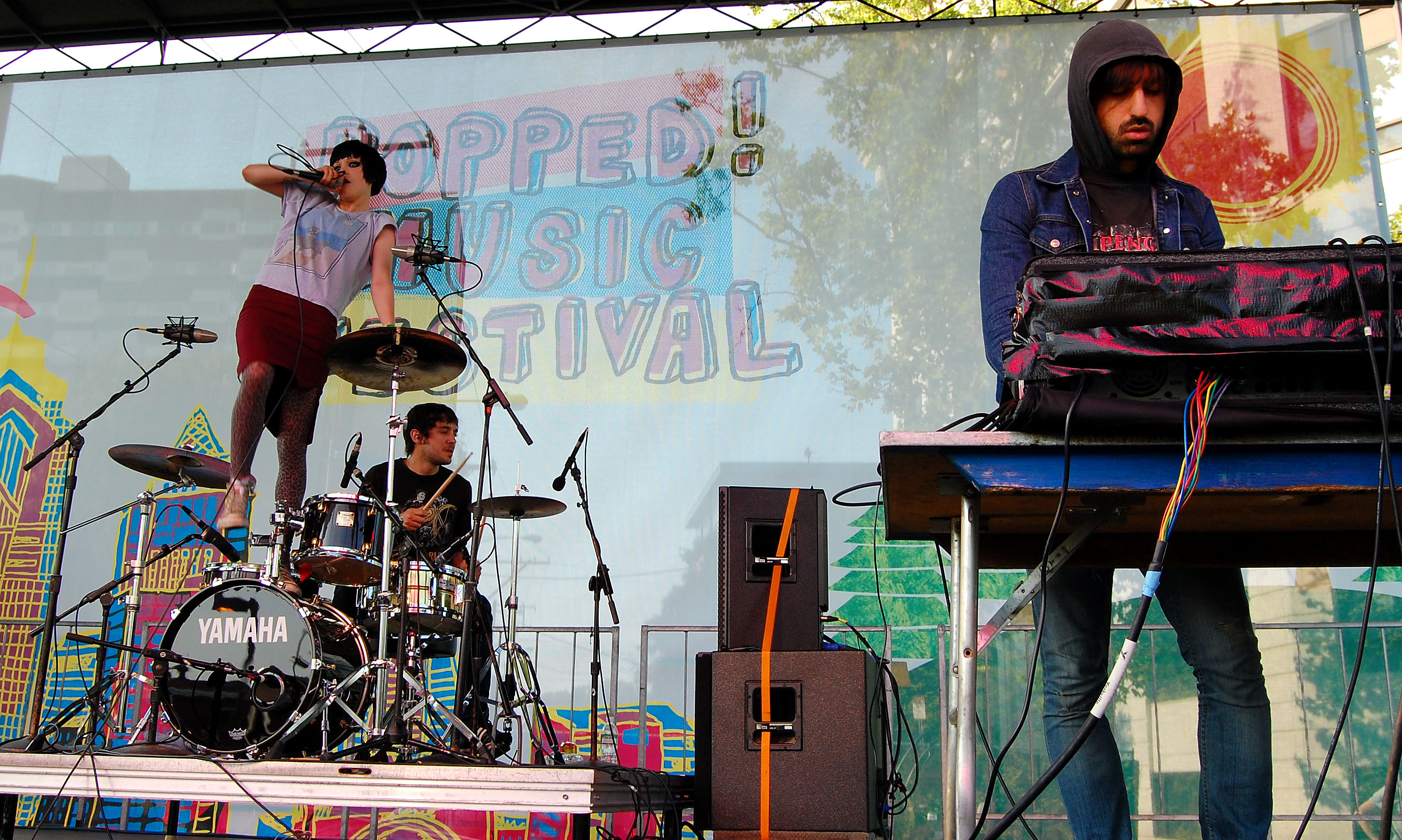
- Crystal Castles performing at the Popped! Music Festival in 2008
- Studio albums: 4
- EPs: 1
- Singles: 17
- Music videos: 14
- Remixes: 10

The discography of the Canadian electronic duo Crystal Castles consists of four studio albums, fourteen music videos, one extended play, seventeen singles, and ten remixes.

Alice Glass (real name Margaret Osborn) and Ethan Kath (real name Claudio Palmieri) first met around 2004. Their first official release as Crystal Castles was an extended play, Alice Practice (2006). After releasing four singles, they released their debut studio album, Crystal Castles (2008). It entered the national charts of France, Ireland, Scotland, and the United Kingdom, and was certified silver by the British Phonographic Industry. Two years later, they released three singles and another self-titled album (also known as Crystal Castles II or II), which charted in Australia, Ireland, Scotland, the United Kingdom, and the United States. Crystal Castles later released a re-recording of that album's "Not in Love" with vocals by Robert Smith, which charted in multiple countries and was certified gold by Music Canada.

In 2012, Crystal Castles released three singles and their third studio album, III, charting in Australia, Belgium, Ireland, Scotland, the United Kingdom, and the United States. Two years later, Glass announced that she was leaving the band, being replaced by Edith Frances the next year. Following the release of six singles, Crystal Castles released their fourth and final studio album, Amnesty (I) (2016), which charted in Belgium, Switzerland, and the United Kingdom. The band has been inactive since Glass made allegations of abuse against Kath in 2017.

== Studio albums ==
List of studio albums, with selected chart positions
Title	Album details	Peak chart positions										Sales	Certifications
Title	Album details	AUS	BEL (FL)	BEL (WA)	FRA	IRE	SCO	SWI	UK	US	US Dance	Sales	Certifications
Crystal Castles	Released: March 18, 2008; Label: Lies, Last Gang; Formats: CD, LP, digital download, streaming	—	—	—	175	49	62	—	47	— (Note: Crystal Castles (2008) did not enter the US Billboard 200, but peaked at number 13 on the US Heatseekers Albums Chart.)	6	US: 72,000	BPI: Silver
Crystal Castles	Released: April 23, 2010; Label: Fiction, Lies, Last Gang; Formats: CD, LP, digital download, streaming	25	— (Note: Crystal Castles (2010) did not enter the Ultratop 200 Albums chart, but peaked at number six on the Flemish Heatseekers chart.)	—	—	56	54	—	48	188	6		
III	Released: November 7, 2012; Label: Fiction, Polydor; Formats: CD, LP, digital download, streaming	74	116	134	—	93	60	—	63	77	2	US: 52,000	
Amnesty (I)	Released: August 19, 2016; Label: Fiction, Casablanca; Formats: CD, LP, digital download, streaming	—	85	113	—	—	—	95	86	—	2		
"—" denotes a recording that did not chart or was not released in that territory.

== Extended plays ==
List of extended plays
Title	EP details
Alice Practice	Released: July 9, 2006; Label: Merok Records; Formats: 7-inch

== Singles ==
List of singles, with selected chart positions, showing year released and album name
Title	Year	Peak chart positions										Certifications	Album
Title	Year	AUS	BEL (FL)	BEL (WA)	CAN Rock	DEN	MEX Air.	SCO	UK	US Alt.	US Dance Digital	Certifications	Album
"Crimewave" (Crystal Castles vs. Health)	2007	—	—	—	—	—	—	57	— (Note: "Crimewave" did not enter the UK Singles Chart, but peaked at number 54 on the UK Physical Singles Chart and 9 on the UK Independent Singles Chart.)	—	—		Crystal Castles (2008)
"Air War"	2007	—	—	—	—	—	—	—	— (Note: "Air War" did not enter the UK Singles Chart, but peaked at number 64 on the UK Physical Singles Chart and 7 on the UK Independent Singles Chart.)	—	—		Crystal Castles (2008)
"Courtship Dating"	2008	—	—	—	—	—	—	—	— (Note: "Courtship Dating" did not enter the UK Singles Chart, but peaked at number 39 on the UK Physical Singles Chart and 4 on the UK Independent Singles Chart.)	—	—		Crystal Castles (2008)
"Vanished"	2008	—	—	—	—	—	—	—	—	—	—	BPI: Silver	Crystal Castles (2008)
"Celestica" (Note: "Celestica" and "Doe Deer" are sometimes referred to as extended plays; both include three 2004 demos.)	2010	—	—	—	—	—	—	—	—	—	—		Crystal Castles (2010)
"Doe Deer"	2010	—	—	—	—	—	—	—	— (Note: "Doe Deer" did not enter the UK Singles Chart, but peaked at number 48 on the UK Physical Singles Chart.)	—	—		Crystal Castles (2010)
"Baptism"	2010	—	—	—	—	—	—	83	— (Note: "Baptism" did not enter the UK Singles Chart, but peaked at number 16 on the UK Dance Singles Chart.)	—	—		Crystal Castles (2010)
"Not in Love" (featuring Robert Smith)	2010	90	53	43	39	31	18	57	54	24	19	MC: Gold	Non-album single (Note: Crystal Castles' original version of "Not in Love" was released on Crystal Castles (2010) without it being a single. The re-recording containing Robert Smith's vocals was later released as a non-album single. In 2011, it was included in a digital reissue of Crystal Castles titled II, replacing the original "Not in Love".)
"Plague"	2012	—	—	—	—	—	—	—	—	—	—		III
"Wrath of God"	2012	—	—	—	—	—	—	—	—	—	—		III
"Affection"	2012	—	—	—	—	—	—	—	—	—	—		III
"Frail"	2015	—	—	—	—	—	—	—	—	—	—		Amnesty (I)
"Deicide"	2015	—	—	—	—	—	—	—	—	—	—		Non-album single (Note: "Deicide" is a demo for the Amnesty (I) track "Their Kindness is Charade".)
"Concrete"	2016	—	—	—	—	—	—	—	—	—	—		Amnesty (I)
"Char"	2016	—	—	—	—	—	—	—	—	—	—		Amnesty (I)
"Fleece"	2016	—	—	—	—	—	—	—	—	—	—		Amnesty (I)
"Sadist"	2016	—	—	—	—	—	—	—	—	—	—		Amnesty (I)
"—" denotes a recording that did not chart or was not released in that territory.

== Other charting songs ==
List of other charting songs, with selected chart positions, showing year released and album name
Title	Year	Peak chart positions			Album
Title	Year	BEL (FL)	MEX Air.	US Dance	Album
"Empathy"	2010	—	—	43	Crystal Castles (2010)
"Suffocation"	2012	—	49	—	Crystal Castles (2010)
"Sad Eyes"	2013	89	—	—	III
"—" denotes a recording that did not chart or was not released in that territory.

== Remixes ==
List of remixes, showing year released and original artist
Title	Year	Artist
"Atlantis to Interzone"	2006	Klaxons
"Leni" (Crystal Castles vs. GoodBooks)	2006	GoodBooks
"Lovers Who Uncover" (Crystal Castles vs. The Little Ones)	2006	The Little Ones
"Divebomb"	2007	The Whip
"Hunting for Witches"	2007	Bloc Party
"Lay Down the Queen" (Note: Originally titled "Lay Down the Law".)	2007	Switches
"Trash the Rental"	2007	Sohodolls
"It Fit When I Was a Kid"	2007	Liars
"Death"	2009	White Lies
"Eat Flesh"	2010	Health

== Music videos ==
List of music videos, showing year released and director
Title	Year	Director
"Air War"	2008	Unknown
"Magic Spells"	2008	Video Marsh
"Courtship Dating"	2008	Marc Pannozzo
"Crimewave"	2008	Unknown
"Knights"	2008	Unknown
"Vanished"	2008	Derrick Beckles, Vernon Chatman
"Celestica"	2010	Ethan Kath, Rob Hawkins
"Baptism"	2010	Rob Hawkins, Marc Pannozzo
"Not in Love" (featuring Robert Smith)	2011	Nic Brown
"Suffocation"	2012	Ethan Kath
"Plague"	2012	Ivan Grbin
"Sad Eyes"	2013	Rob Hawkins, Marc Pannozzo
"Affection"	2013	Stephen Agnew
"Concrete"	2016	Unknown
