= Soy Cámara =

- Also known as: Soy Cámara. El programa del CCCB
- Genre: Cultural
- Original language: Spanish or Spanish subtitles

Production
- Producers: CCCB; RTVE
- Running time: 30 minutes

Original release
- Network: La 2 of RTVE

Soy Cámara. El programa del CCCB was a television programme based around the activities organized by the Centre de Cultura Contemporània de Barcelona with the aim of creating a documentary essay. It was co-produced by the CCCB and RTVE and was broadcast monthly on La 2 from 2010 to 2015. The first programme aired in October 2010. Nowadays it is broadcasting weekly in its YouTube channel, keeping its original aim and opening itself to new collaborations with universities, cinema schools and external filmmakers.

== Format and style ==
Editing archive material and interviews as a leading thread, it experiments with television formats. The programmes invite criticism and reflection while remaining enjoyable and dynamic, introducing irony with a hint of transgression of discourse and editing. The idea of hosting different opinions about issues and the absence of a narrator mean that more questions than answers are raised.

Rather than a cultural agenda of the CCCB, this is a space for creation that is more or less independent of the activities that take place at the centre.

== Directors and collaborators ==
The programme direction varies with each episode. The most regular directors to date are Andrés Hispano and Félix Pérez-Hita, previously directors of Boing Boing Buddha (BTV) and Baixa Fidelitat (XTVL). However, other collaborators have also played this role, including Juan Insua, Judit Carrera, Elisabet Goula, Jorge Luis Marzo, Arturo “Fito” Rodríguez, Ingrid Guardiola and Antonio Monegal.

Each programme contains contributions by different collaborators. International interviewers include Roy Ascott, Philip Ball, Zygmunt Bauman, Judith Butler, Noam Chomsky, Daniel Dennett, Andrés Duque, Harun Farocki, John N. Gray, Naomi Klein, Lawrence Lessig, Jonas Mekas, Alan Moore, Martin Parr, Rick Prelinger, Michael Sandel, Richard Sennett, Vandana Shiva, Bernard Stiegler, Tzvetan Todorov, Gao Xingjian…

Interviewers from Spain include Samuel Aranda, Oriol Bohigas, Colita, Joan Fontcuberta, Manuel Huerga, Quim Monzó, Iván Morales, Albert Serra…

== Episodes ==
The programme's episodes can be divided into seven blocks. The number of the programme is shown in brackets.

New paradigms and new technologies:

1. Pensar el futuro [Conceiving the future] (2)
2. I+C+i [R+C+i] (5)
3. Mal de archivo [Archive ache] (12)
4. Secreto [Secret] (23)
5. En mi habitación [In my room] (29)
6. Somos mundos, somos vidas, somos datos, somos votos [We are worlds, we are lives, we are data, we are votes] (30)

Image analysis:

1. Violencia [Violence] (3)
2. Yo también soy cámara [I'm a camera, too] (17)
3. Más fotoperiodismo hoy [More photojournalism today] (19)
4. Material sensible [Sensitive material] (24)

Cinema and television:

1. Apropiaciones [Appropriations] (9)
2. El museo de los accidentes [The museum of accidents] (10)
3. El cine en casa [Home cinema] (20)
4. Videocracia. Ficción y Política [Videocracy. Fiction and politics] (25)
5. Asuntos domésticos [Domestic affairs] (28)
6. Pioneras del cine [Pioneering women in the cinema] (38)

Third culture. Science and art:

1. Ética [Ethics] (7)
2. Now #1 (15)
3. Now #2 (16)
4. ¿Qué nos hace humanos? [What makes us human?] (27)
5. Sueños que el dinero puede comprar [Dreams that money can buy] (37)

City and public space:

1. Ciudad [City] (3)
2. Raval (6)
3. Desde mi balcón [From my balcony] (11)
4. Europa Ciudad [Europe city] (21)
5. En paralelo [In parallel] (28)

Art and culture:

1. La música del CCCB [The CCCB's music] (8)
2. Coleccionismo [Collecting] (22)
3. La memoria externa [External memory] (18)
4. No tocar, por favor [Don't touch, please] (31)
5. El artista en su taller [The artist in their studio] (32)
6. ¿Para qué sirve la cultura? [What is culture for?] (36)

Literature and writers:

1. Querido Público [Dear audience] (33)
2. La imagen del escritor [The image of the writer] (34)
3. Pasolini hoy, todavía en los márgenes [Pasolini today, still on the fringes] (35)
