= All Hail =

All Hail may refer to:

- All Hail (Kïll Cheerleadër album)
- All Hail (Norma Jean album)
- All Hail (film)
