= Time Festival =

Music festival in Toronto, Canada

TIME Festival
- Genre: Music festival, electronic dance music, indie rock, hip hop
- Dates: August 2017
- Locations: Toronto, Ontario, Canada
- Years active: 2008–2010, 2014–present
- Founders: Embrace
- Website: www.time-fest.com

TIME Festival is a one-day summer music festival organized by Embrace Entertainment and held annually in Toronto, Ontario, Canada at Fort York Garrison Commons. The event focuses on electronic music, hip hop, and indie rock and features DJs and groups from around the world, as well as local Toronto artists.

Founded in 2008, the event now incorporates more genres of music. Since its return in 2014, headliners have included Run The Jewels, Die Antwoord, and Grimes.

== TIME Festival 2016 ==
The 2016 edition took place on Saturday, August 6 at Fort York. The event included two stages. Artists including Run The Jewels, Broods, Kehlani, Joey Bada$$, and Everything Everything performed on the main stage. DJs, electronic acts, and hip hop artists, including Bob Moses, Chrome Sparks, Kirk Knight & Nyck Caution, and Tokimonsta performed on the "overTIME" stage.

== TIME Festival 2015 ==
On August 15, 2015, TIME Festival returned to Fort York. The lineup included Die Antwoord, Mac DeMarco, Ariel Pink, BadBadNotGood, Freddie Gibbs, Ryan Hemsworth, DIIV, Alison Wonderland, Tory Lanez, and more. NOW Magazine's review of the festival praised it for its eclectic bill, with Lisa Ladouceur writing: "who needs another music festival in Toronto this summer? Misfits, that’s who... Headlined by Die Atwoord and Mac DeMarco, it was a day of disparate musical oddities, each a misfit in their own right."

== TIME Festival 2014 ==
Returning from a three-year hiatus, TIME Festival 2014 was announced for July 19. It included performances by Grimes, Flume, Action Bronson, St. Lucia, Jon Hopkins, Smith Westerns, Kaytranada, Majical Cloudz, and more. California hip hop trio Death Grips and British pop star Charli XCX both dropped out, despite being on the originally announced lineup.

== TIME Festival 2010 ==
The 2010 festival took place on July 23 at Toronto's Sound Academy. Its three stages featured performances by Diplo, Skream, Benga, Milano, Azari & III, and more.

== TIME Festival 2009 ==
TIME Festival 2009 was held Saturday, July 25 at the Sound Academy. The event included four stages. Performers were Crystal Castles, A-Trak, DJ Mehdi, Flosstradamus, Don Rimini, Meech, Barletta, Egyptrixx, Bangers & Mash, Gingy, Jeff Mills, Felix Cartal and Mark Farina. Local Toronto performers include Parallels, Andy Ares, Milano, Nasty Nav, TMDP, Duval, Vaneska, Jamie Kidd, Nitin, Evan G., Johnny White, Kenny Glasgow, Brandon Sek, Jeff Button and NuFunk DJ's.

== TIME Festival 2008 ==
The inaugural TIME Festival was held at Toronto's Sunnyside Pavilion. It included two stages – one focusing on indietronica and the other on techno-underground sounds. Notable acts included Soulwax, Matthew Dear, Erol Alkan, and A-Trak, among others. The event also featured vendors and fashion designers from around Toronto.

== Media coverage ==
"An affordable and unpredictable option on Toronto's increasingly crowded festival calendar continues to be the late-summer TIME Festival." – NOW Magazine

"This unpredictable annual fest is like a music nerd's iPod on shuffle." – Toronto Life

"For a day-long festival just around the corner and at about $30 a ticket, Toronto’s TIME festival is most definitely a great local alternative for those who can't afford the weekend long festivals away." – Into the Crowd Magazine

== See also ==
- List of electronic music festivals
