= Doe Deer =

Single by Crystal Castles

from the album Crystal Castles
- Released: April 17, 2010
- Genre: Digital hardcore
- Length: 1:37
- Label: Polydor; Fiction
- Songwriters: Alice Glass; Ethan Kath
- Producer: Ethan Kath

Crystal Castles singles chronology
"Celestica" (2010)	"Doe Deer" (2010)	"Baptism" (2010)

"Doe Deer" is a song by the Canadian duo Crystal Castles for their second studio album, Crystal Castles (2010). It was released on April 17, 2010, as the second single (Note: Some sources describe it as an EP.) from the album. The single was available exclusively on 12-inch vinyl, limited to 500 copies, and contains three 2004 songs. "Doe Deer" is one minute and 37 seconds long, and multiple critics described it as "brutal" and one of the few harsher tracks on the album. It was played on BBC Radio 1 before its official release and later peaked at number 48 on the United Kingdom's Physical Singles Chart.

== Background and composition ==
Crystal Castles wrote "Doe Deer" for their second studio album, Crystal Castles (2010); according to a press release, the album was recorded at "an Icelandic church, a Canadian cabin, and a Detroit garage". The band members Alice Glass and Ethan Kath wrote the song, with Kath producing it.

The track is one minute and 37 seconds long. Multiple critics said that the track was "brutal"; Justin Jacobs of Paste called it "a bloody electric seizure", while The New York Times's Nate Chinen named it "a corrosive blast of mania". Ian Cohen of Pitchfork said that this was one of the few "punishing, epileptic moments" on Crystal Castles, and similarly, Mosi Reeves of Spin wrote that, as a digital hardcore song, it was one of the few tracks on the album where Alice Glass kept her "agitated screaming".

Mehan Jayasuriya of PopMatters said that "Doe Deer" puts intensely distorted and piercing screams over a "fragmented, fuzzed-out synth line", while Emily Mackay of NME wrote that it is pure Crystal Castles, with "that serrated ground-Glass shriek, the itchy, nervy beats, the nagging riff". Heather Phares of AllMusic compared it to Crystal Castles' song "Alice Practice", though, despite it being "harsher, more thoroughly spindled and mutilated", it still has a shining melody behind its distortion. musicOMH's Tim Lee wrote that "Doe Deer" could be the Kath's soundtrack to Glass "[sacrificing] Bambi's mother". Mackay said that the song "makes you want to fight, fuck or flee, to jump on the nearest table and start ape-grimacing and throwing things, possibly your own faeces".

== Release and reception ==
"Doe Deer" was first announced on March 30, 2010, as a special Record Store Day release for April 17, 2010. It was available exclusively on 12-inch vinyl and limited to 500 copies. The vinyl contains the tracks "Mother Knows Best", "Seed", and "Insectica", recorded in 2004 before Crystal Castles added electronics to their sound. It was released through Polydor and Fiction. Before its official release, BBC Radio 1 played the song. Tom Breihan of Pitchfork called "Doe Deer" a "blasted-out ... banger", while AllMusic's Heather Phares said that it demonstrated how Crystal Castles' sound had evolved. In the United Kingdom, "Doe Deer" peaked at number 48 on the Official Charts Company's Physical Singles Chart.

== Track listing ==
Adapted from the vinyl liner notes.

Side A

1. "Doe Deer" – 1:37
2. "Mother Knows Best" (2004 version) – 2:01

Side B

1. "Insectica" (2004 version) – 1:48
2. "Seed" (2004 version) – 1:42

== Personnel ==
Adapted from the CD liner notes of Crystal Castles.

- Ethan Kath – producer, mixer, writer
- Alice Glass – writer
- Matthew Wagner – vocal recording

== Charts ==
Chart performance for "Doe Deer"
Chart (2010)	Peak position
UK Physical Singles Chart (OCC)	48
