= Control Freak (disambiguation) =

A control freak is a person who needs to be in control.

Control Freak or Control Freaks may refer to:

== Film and television ==
- Control Freak (film), a 2025 body horror film
- Control Freaks (TV series), a weekly video game review television show
- Control Freaks, a 2005 episode of the television show "Danny Phantom", see List of Danny Phantom episodes
- Control Freak!, a 2001 episode of the television cartoon Pokemon, see List of Pokémon episodes (seasons 1–9)

== Music ==
=== Albums ===
- Control Freak (album), a working title for the 2007 Mya album Liberation
- Control Freaks (album), the 2003 debut album by British girl group Sirens
- Control Freaks – The Remixes, a 2007 album by British indie band GoodBooks

=== Songs ===
- "Control Freak", by Recoil from Unsound Methods, 1997
- "Control Freak", by Godflesh from Us and Them, 1999
- "Control Freak", by Venom from Resurrection, 2000
- "Control Freak", by Stereomud from Every Given Moment, 2003
- "Control Freak", by Saul Williams from Saul Williams, 2004
- "Controrl Freak", by Armin van Buuren from Shivers, 2005
- "Control Freak", by Copeland from Eat, Sleep, Repeat, 2006
- "Control Freak", a 2006 single by Danny Byrd
- "Control Freak", by Bigelf from Into the Maelstrom, 2008
- "Control Freak", a 2011 song by Sodagreen
- "Control Freak", by Steve Aoki from Wonderland, 2012
- "Control Freak", by The Fizz from The F–Z of Pop, 2017
- "Control Freak", by Priests from The Seduction of Kansas, 2019

== Other uses ==
- Control Freak (Teen Titans), a DC Comics supervillain

== See also ==
- Control Freek, a 2009 album by Tash
