= Celestica =

Canadian company

Celestica Inc.
- Type: Public
- Traded as: TSX: CLS; S&P/TSX 60 component
- Industry: Electronics
- Founded: 1994; 32 years ago
- Founder: IBM
- Headquarters: Toronto, Ontario, Canada
- Key people: Rob Mionis (CEO)
- Revenue: ▲US$ 9.65 billion (2024)
- Net income: ▲US$ 145.5 million (2022)
- Total assets: ▲US$5.268 billion (2022)
- Total equity: ▲US$1.678 billion (2022)
- Number of employees: 21,900 (2025)
- Website: www.celestica.com

Celestica Inc. is a Canadian multinational design, manufacturing, hardware platform, and supply chain electronics manufacturing services (EMS) company, which is headquartered in Toronto, Ontario. The company operates in 50 sites across 15 countries.

== History ==
Celestica was incorporated in 1994 as a subsidiary of IBM. In 1996, it was sold off to Onex Corporation. On 29 June 1998, Celestica began its initial public offering (IPO) and agreed to sell 20.6 million shares at a price of US$17.50.

In April 2001, the company announced it was laying off 3,000 people, about 10% of its workforce, due to the dot-com crash. Losses mounted and on 29 January 2004 the company announced that company CEO Eugene Polistuk would be retiring. In April 2004, Stephen Delaney took over as CEO in a temporary capacity.

According to Ethan Kath, a 2010 song with the title of Celestica was inspired by a suicide that happened at this company. He said that a worker reportedly jumped into a vat of hot plastic, which was then rumoured to still be used in manufacturing.

CEO Craig Muhlhauser announced his retirement in October 2014. Rob Mionis took over from him on 1 August 2015.

In 2014, the municipality of Toronto received a multi-use redevelopment proposal targeting Celestica's head office and factory in Don Mills in Toronto, intended to capitalize on its valuable location, especially with the Eglinton LRT. Before Celestica was founded, this site was originally used by IBM Canada. On March of 2019, the sale of this site for its redevelopment was finalized. Later, the east building of the site was completely demolished, while the exterior of the west building, nominated for a Massey Medal for Architecture in 1970, was preserved via façadism for heritage conservation. Today, Celestica has its headquarters in North York Centre.

In the mid-2020s, Celestica's stocks rose rapidly due to its contributions and supply to data centres during the AI boom, making Celestica one of Canada's top-performing stocks.

=== Acquisition history ===
In 1997, Celestica established its presence in Europe with the acquisition of Design-to-Distribution (D2D) Limited, an International Computers Limited (ICL) company that was the largest European-based EMS company. The same year, Celestica announced its first US-based acquisition: Hewlett-Packard's Fort Collins, Colorado, printed circuit assembly (PCA) operation.

In January 1998, Celestica established its first manufacturing presence in Mexico by acquiring Lucent Technologies's manufacturing facility in Monterrey, Mexico. The following month, the company expanded its European footprint by acquiring Madge Networks' Dublin, Ireland operation. Also in 1998, acquired IMS (International Manufacturing Services) to establish manufacturing operations in Japan, Thailand, Hong Kong, and China.

In 2000, Celestica acquired IBM's facilities in Vimercate and Santa Palomba, Italy and a facility in Rochester, Minnesota. In May 2001, certain Avaya, Inc., products and manufacturing processes were acquired by Celestica. The locations of Avaya's Denver, Colorado and Little Rock, Arkansas were for Celestica to supply telecommunications products such as printed circuit boards and systems repair, test, and assembly. This acquisition of Avaya's certain assets were for Celestica to establish a five-year contract in manufacturing outsourcing partnership and supply chain management for a more diverse telecommunication products for Celestica.

In August 2001, certain Lucent Technologies manufacturing assets in Oklahoma City, Oklahoma and Columbus, Ohio were signed into a five-year supply agreement by Celestica and positioning it as a lead electronics manufacturing services provider for Lucent’s North American wireless networking systems, access, and switching products. With this supply agreement with Lucent, it was one of the top three customers with over 10% of the revenue for Celestica in 2001, IBM and Sun Microsystems were the other customers in this revenue segment since 2000 and 1999, respectively. The Lucent deal cost $570 million in cash for Celestica and possible value of up to $10 billion as a contract manufacturer for Lucent's strategy of developing networking systems, instead of manufacturing.

In August 2001, Celestica acquired certain assets in Saumur, France and established a global location at the following address: ZI de Saint Lambert 49412 Saumur Cedex France. In October 2001, Celestica acquired Omni Industries, expanding the company's presence in China, Malaysia and Singapore. Additionally, adding corporate locations in Thailand and Indonesia with the Omni acquisition. Later in February 2005, Celestica announced it will close its manufacturing plant in Mt. Pleasant, Iowa, affecting 334 employees and 90 temporary workers. In 2012, Celestica acquired D&H Manufacturing Company, a leading manufacturer of precision machined components and assemblies. In 2018, Celestica acquired Atrenne Integrated solutions and Impakt.

== Social and environmental responsibility ==
When Celestica moved out of their Don Mills campus in the 2010s, they tried to minimize the amount of items left behind before demolition by reusing them in the new Newmarket campus in Canada, recycling, donations, sales and auctions. This included binders, computers, e-waste, furniture and other equipment. Close to 1.5 million pounds of wood were sent to farmers as animal bedding or wooden pallets, and around 900,000 pounds of metal was recycled. In total, Celestica achieved a 93% waste diversion rate, keeping about 5.4 million pounds of items away from landfills.

In 2021, Celestica committed to the UN Global Compact corporate responsibility initiative and its principles in the areas of human rights, labour, the environment, and anti-corruption. Celestica adopted the UN Sustainable Development Goals (SDGs) as part of its sustainability strategy and corporate social responsibility programs. The goals promote strategies to address poverty, inequality, climate change, environmental degradation, peace, and justice.

== Awards and recognition ==
Celestica has been the recipient of the following awards:

- The Corporate Knights, Best 50 Corporate Citizens (years: 2022, 2021, 2019, 2017, 2016, 2015)
- The Global 100 Most Sustainable Corporations in the World, Corporate Knights (years: 2019, 2016, 2015)
- Lam Research, Supplier Excellence Award (2020)
- Clean 16 Leadership in Greenhouse Gas Emissions Reductions (2021)
- Clean 50 Top Project: Recognition for Environmental Protection and Recycling Practices (2021)

== See also ==
- List of companies of Canada
- Companies listed on the New York Stock Exchange (C)
- List of multinational corporations
- List of mergers and acquisitions by IBM
- List of largest technology companies by revenue
