= Control (GoodBooks album) =

Studio album by GoodBooks
- Released: July 30, 2007
- Recorded: 2006–2007
- Genre: Indie rock
- Length: 49:53
- Label: Columbia

GoodBooks chronology
Control (2007)	Control Freaks – The Remixes (2007)

Professional ratings
Review scores
Source	Rating
NME	link
Yahoo! Music UK	link

Control is the debut and only studio album by indie rock band GoodBooks. It was released on July 30, 2007 on CD, LP and as a digital download. The end of the song "Start/Stop" has an instrumental at the end of it.

== Track listing ==
1. "Beautiful to Watch"
2. "The Illness"
3. "Passchendaele"
4. "The Curse of Saul"
5. "Alice"
6. "Good Life Salesman"
7. "Violent Man Lovesong"
8. "The Last Day"
9. "Walk with Me"
10. "Leni"
11. "Turn It Back"
12. "Start/Stop"
13. "Leni (Crystal Castles vs. GoodBooks)" (iTunes UK exclusive)
14. "The Illness (acoustic version)" (iTunes UK exclusive)
15. "Walk with Me (Live from the Scala)" (iTunes UK exclusive)
