= Not in Love (Crystal Castles song) =

Single by Crystal Castles featuring Robert Smith
- Released: October 26, 2010
- Genre: Gothic rock
- Length: 3:49
- Label: Polydor
- Songwriters: Alice Glass; Ethan Kath; Mark Holmes; Robert Smith
- Producers: Ethan Kath; Jacknife Lee; Paul Epworth

Crystal Castles singles chronology
"Baptism" (2010)	"Not in Love" (2010)	"Plague" (2012)

Robert Smith singles chronology
"J'aurai tout essayé" (2010)	"Not in Love" (2010)	"It Never Was the Same" (2015)

"Not in Love" is a song recorded by the Canadian electronic music duo Crystal Castles. It is a cover of the 1983 single by the Canadian rock band Platinum Blonde. A first version appeared on Crystal Castles' second studio album, Crystal Castles (2010), with vocals from the member Ethan Kath. Following the album's release, Robert Smith of the Cure asked for permission to remix one of its tracks. Kath instead asked Smith to record his own vocals, which were used in a remix that was digitally released as a non-album single on October 26, 2010, alongside a music video.

Critics stated the first version of "Not in Love", which is a synth-pop song, is calmer than Smith's version, which is a gothic rock song and has stronger beats and synthesizers. Although critics generally described the album version as unexciting, they praised Smith's cover, especially its vocals, and some publications named it one of the best songs of 2010. The Smith cover appeared in the singles charts of Australia, Denmark, Scotland, and the United Kingdom, and was certified gold by Music Canada.

== Background and release ==
"Not in Love" is a 1983 song by the Canadian rock band Platinum Blonde that the Canadian electronic music duo Crystal Castles covered for their self-titled 2010 studio album. Ethan Kath recorded his vocals as "a scratch demo". He intended to re-record the song, but the demo was used for the finished version and released on the album. Following the album's launch, Robert Smith of the Cure, whom Crystal Castles had first met when the duo opened for the band at London's The O2 Arena in February 2009, asked if he could remix one of its tracks. Kath instead suggested that Smith record his own vocals for their version of "Not in Love". Smith recorded demo vocals in his home. According to Kath, when the band listened to the result, they became attached to his "raw" vocals and decided to retain Smith's demo and cancel their plans to re-record him in a studio.

The version of "Not in Love" with Smith's vocals was announced on October 25, 2010, and officially released as a single the next day through Polydor Records. It was planned to be launched in the United Kingdom via Fiction Records with acoustic demos of "Celestica" and "Suffocation" as B-sides on December 6. "Not in Love" was sent to American alternative radio stations on January 11, 2011, and an accompanying music video that was directed by Nic Brown was released the same month, containing VHS-styled footage. The song was included in the video game FIFA 12 (2011).

== Composition ==
"Not in Love" (album version)
The album version of "Not in Love" is calmer, with Ethan Kath providing distant vocals.

"Not in Love" (version with Robert Smith)
The version with Robert Smith has stronger synthesizers and vocal delivery, as well as a heavier mix in the chorus.

Heather Phares of AllMusic characterized Crystal Castles' first cover of "Not in Love" as synth-pop. Pitchfork's Mark Richardson wrote that the album version is filled with digital noise and heavy distortion. Cameron Scheetz of The A.V. Club said Kath's "distant, distorted vocals" on the first version provides a ghostly feel to the lyrics. According to an NME writer, the keyboards' urgency builds into a wall of sound that surrounds the listener "like a blanket".

Rolling Stone's Andi Harriman characterized the version with Smith's vocals as gothic rock. Scheetz said it brings Smith's emotive vocals to the forefront and enhances the song's "throbbing" beat, adding that, in the chorus, "the already propulsive synthesizers become unavoidably sweeping". Beats Per Minute's Philip Cosores said this version's chorus has a heavier mix than the first's. Mark Pytlik, writing for Pitchfork, felt the first cover was "much tamer" than the Smith version. According to Pytlik, Kath's "storming synth squalls" provide a perfect contrast to Smith's "precarious and insecure delivery". Larry Fitzmaurice of Pitchfork said the Smith version has powerful synths with an anthemic intensity and a "more muscular framework" when compared to the first.

== Critical reception ==
=== Album version ===
Critics generally considered the album version of "Not in Love" unexciting; according to Pytlik, the track "barely seemed to make a dent" when it was released. Drowned in Sound's James Lawrenson wrote that it could be considered filler and launched as a B-side, while Cosores of Beats Per Minute agreed that it was pedestrian. Emily Bick of The Quietus wrote of "discomfort, disillusion, despair", while Justin Jacobs of Paste described it as pretty and as sounding "the way twinkling Christmas lights look".

=== Robert Smith version ===
Smith's cover was generally well received by critics. Pitchfork named it a "Best New Track" and Fact staff called the track "as satisfying as you could have hoped for". Larry Fitzmaurice, writing for Pitchfork, said the cover is massive, evoking chills, and its "high-definition angst" made it unique to the band. Molly Beauchemin, also from Pitchfork, called it one of Crystal Castles' "finest, most cathartic ballads", having an explosive, life-affirming chorus that transitions into Kath's tender interludes with "triumphant precision". Brandon Stosuy of Stereogum said the Smith version could be considered the best the Cure song in years, while providing a new perspective on the "saturated, blasted goth-noise prettiness" of Crystal Castles. A writer for DIY described the song as the most-destined for festival stages and the purest of any Crystal Castles release; they concluded that it was one of the best covers of the 2010s and "a crazed re-creation of a song that looked to be dead and buried".

Smith's vocals in particular drew praise. According to Scheetz, his emotional vulnerability reveals "the tender longing[s] beneath Crystal Castles' cool, icy facade". Slant Magazine staff wrote that the gritty production, along with Smith's "familiar pangs", is "heart-wrenching and nothing short of blisteringly gorgeous", while a The Independent reviewer said the song is great, with Crystal Castles' "electro noise" perfectly fitting Smith's characteristic vocals. Fitzmaurice also considered it one of Smith's best performances in a long time, with Rolling Stone's Barry Walters naming it Smith's "catchiest, most immediately satisfied record" since "Friday I'm in Love" (1992). Richardson judged that Smith improved Crystal Castles' first version, balancing nostalgia and the immediacy of life. Pitchfork's Ryan Dombal described Smith's vocals as "loud and clear", making this one of Crystal Castles' catchiest works.

Reviewing a live performance of "Not in Love" with Alice Glass's vocals at the Brixton Academy, a The Independent writer felt that her voice was "too harsh", with her timing being off.

==== Accolades ====
The "Not in Love" re-recording with Smith was ranked as one of the 20 best songs of 2010 by Beats Per Minute, Pitchfork, and Slant Magazine. It also entered the year-end lists of BBC Radio 6 Music, Fact, and PopMatters, while Pazz & Jop critics voted it as one of the best songs of the year. Rolling Stone considered it one of the best covers of the year. In 2014, Pitchfork considered it among the best songs of the decade thus far. In 2022, Rolling Stone named the track as one of the best goth songs of all time.

Accolades for "Not in Love"
Publication	List	Rank	Ref.
BBC Radio 6 Music	Top 40 of 2010 (shortlist)	—N/a	
Beats Per Minute	The top 50 tracks of 2010	18	
Fact	The 100 best tracks of 2010	39	
Pazz & Jop	2010 singles poll	22	
Pitchfork	The top 100 tracks of 2010	15	
Pitchfork	The 200 best tracks of the decade so far (2010–2014)	34	
PopMatters	The 60 best songs of 2010	47	
Rolling Stone	Best covers (2010)	—N/a	
Rolling Stone	The 50 best goth songs of all time (2022)	20	
Slant Magazine	The 25 best singles of 2010	13	

== Commercial performance ==
In Australia, "Not in Love" peaked at number 90 in the ARIA Charts. In Belgium, it charted at number 3 on the Ultratip Bubbling Under Flanders chart, and at number 43 on the Ultratop 50 Wallonia chart. In Canada, the song entered Billboard's Canada Rock at number 39 and was certified gold by Music Canada, with 40,000 certified units. It appeared at number 31 in Denmark's Tracklisten. In Mexico, it peaked at 18 on Billboard's Mexico Ingles Airplay chart. "Not in Love" peaked at number 57 on the Official Charts Company's Scottish Singles Chart and at number 53 on the UK Singles Chart. In the United States, it entered the two Billboard charts, peaking at number 24 on Alternative Airplay and at number 19 on Dance/Electronic Digital Song Sales.

== Personnel ==
Album version

- Mark Holmes – writer
- Ethan Kath – writer, producer, mixer
- Jacknife Lee – producer

Robert Smith version

- Alice Glass – performer, writer
- Ethan Kath – performer, writer, producer
- Robert Smith – performer, writer
- Mark Holmes – writer
- Jacknife Lee – producer
- Paul Epworth – producer

== Chart performance ==
Chart performance for "Not in Love"
Chart (2010)	Peak position
Australia (ARIA)	90
Belgium (Ultratip Bubbling Under Flanders)	3
Belgium (Ultratop 50 Wallonia)	43
Canada Rock (Billboard)	39
Denmark (Tracklisten)	31
Mexico Ingles Airplay (Billboard)	18
Scotland Singles (OCC)	57
UK Singles (OCC)	54
US Alternative Airplay (Billboard)	24
US Dance/Electronic Digital Song Sales (Billboard)	19

== Certifications ==
Certifications for "Not in Love"
Region	Certification	Certified units/sales
Canada (Music Canada)	Gold	40,000^{‡}
^{‡} Sales+streaming figures based on certification alone.
