= Kïll Cheerleadër =

Canadian rock band (1999–2006)

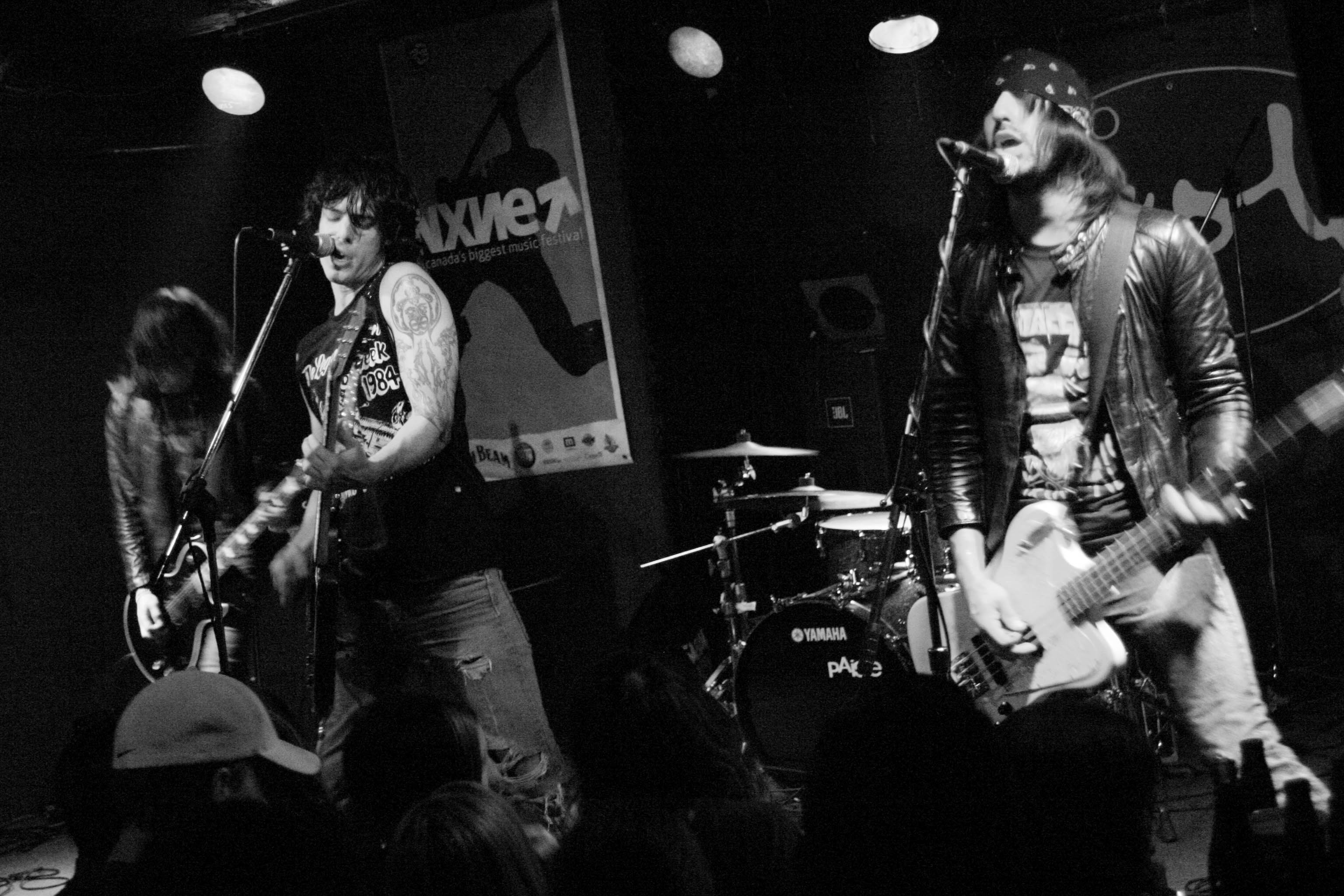
- Kïll Cheerleadër performing in 2003

Background information
- Origin: Toronto, Ontario, Canada
- Genres: Sleaze metal, biker metal
- Years active: 1999–2006
- Labels: Spinerazor, Sonico, Corporate Punishment
- Spinoffs: Crystal Castles; Goat Horn; Skull Fist; Darlings of Chelsea; Diemonds
- Past members: Chad "Dallas" MacKinnon; Christopher "Rites" Chartrand; Ethan Kath; Jason Decay; Anthony Useless; Zach "Jakki" Slaughter; Jimmy Nova; Brandon Wars

Kïll Cheerleadër (previously known as Cheerleader 666) was a Canadian rock band whose members formed in 1999 in Toronto. Mainly influenced by punk rock and heavy metal acts such as the Stooges, early-era Guns N' Roses, Mötley Crüe, Iron Maiden, the Ramones, Girlschool, Joan Jett, and Neil Young, they had crafted their own unique, sleazy style of rock and roll, once being described as "a derailed train hitting a Baptist Church". Lemmy of Motörhead described Kïll Cheerleadër as "the greatest rock'n'roll band since Guns N' Roses".

== History ==
After some 8,000 demo CDs were sold, a German record label licensed one of their unmixed/unmastered recordings and released it as 7-track LP titled Gutter Days, which was rereleased on 10" vinyl in 2003. Lemmy Kilmister from Motörhead invited them to open their UK tour and talked about them on SuicideGirls.com and in Playboy, declaring Kïll Cheerleadër as the "greatest rock and roll band since Guns N' Roses".

After travelling to the U.S. West Coast and playing a number of high-profile shows in Los Angeles. Their debut album, All Hail, was released in 2004 through Spinerazor Records.

The band broke up in 2006 on the eve of a major record deal.

== Discography ==
- 2000: Demo CD-R
- 2001: Gutter Days (CD-R released in 2001, 10" vinyl released in 2003 as Cheerleader 666)
- 2004: All Hail (debut full-length CD as Kill Cheerleader released on Spinerazor/Corporate Punishment in 2004, re-issued on Sanctuary in 2006, limited vinyl release on Yeah Right Records in 2015.)

== See also ==
- Music of Canada
- Canadian rock
- List of bands from Canada
