= Darlings of Chelsea =

Canadian punk rock band

- Origin: Toronto, Ontario, Canada
- Genre: Punk rock
- Years active: 2008–present
- Label: North Ruckus
- Members: Jay Millette; Chris Nova; Robby Ruckus; Paul Thompson
- Past members: Sean Robertson
- Website: darlingsofchelsea.net

The Darlings of Chelsea are a Canadian punk rock band formed in 2008 in Toronto. The band toured Ireland in 2009 as part of Canadian Music Week.

== Biography ==
The band's name is credited to Englishman Sean Robertson. The band thought it would be good to have a British flair to their name and hence Chelsea. The Darlings of Chelsea sound has been compared to The Rolling Stones, The Hellacopters and Led Zeppelin. Often referred to as veterans of the Canadian punk/rock scene, their members have played in other bands: The Black Halos (Jay Millette), Robin Black (Robby Ruckus), Kïll Cheerleadër (Chris "Jimmy" Nova), Scratching Post, The Parkas, and CJ Sleez. Their debut EP The Mimico Sessions, was released domestically on North Ruckus and in the US on distributor Ribotto June 26, 2009. It was named "Top 5 Album of the Year" and "Best New Band of 2009" by Mass Movement Magazine.

The Darlings of Chelsea's first full-length album Panic is Worse than the Emergency was released September 13, 2011 on label North Ruckus.

The band has received radio play on campus radio stations across Canada.

=== Members ===
- Paul Thompson - Guitar and Lead Vocals
- Jay Millette - Guitar
- Robby Ruckus - Bass guitar
- Chris Nova - Drums

== Discography ==
- The Mimico Sessions EP (Independent/North Ruckus) - June 26, 2009
- Panic is Worse than the Emergency (Independent/North Ruckus) - September 13, 2011

== See also ==
- Music of Canada
- Canadian rock
- List of bands from Canada
