= III (Crystal Castles album) =

2012 studio album by Crystal Castles

Studio album by Crystal Castles
- Released: November 7, 2012
- Recorded: Berlin, Germany; Warsaw, Poland
- Genres: Electronica; witch house
- Length: 39:33
- Labels: Fiction; Last Gang; Polydor
- Producers: Ethan Kath; Jacknife Lee

Crystal Castles chronology
Crystal Castles II (2010)	III (2012)	Amnesty (I) (2016)

Singles from III
- 1. "Plague" Released: July 25, 2012; 2. "Wrath of God" Released: September 26, 2012; 3. "Affection" Released: October 31, 2012

III (stylized as (III)) is the third studio album by Canadian electronic music duo Crystal Castles, released on November 7, 2012, by Fiction Records and Polydor Records. Production was handled by Ethan Kath, with additional production by Jacknife Lee.

III is the last Crystal Castles album with vocalist Alice Glass before her departure in 2014, and is also their last eponymous album, as the band's 2016 album is titled Amnesty (I) instead of (IV) or Crystal Castles. Alice Glass continued the series on her own by including "IV" into the title of her 2022 debut album Prey//IV.

== Background and recording ==
Produced by Ethan Kath, III was recorded in Berlin and Warsaw, and mixed in London. The album addresses the theme of oppression, with the musicians using different pedals and keyboards to create a diverse "palette of sound". "A lot of bad things have happened to people close to me since II and it's profoundly influenced my writing as I've realized there will never be justice for them. I didn't think I could lose faith in humanity any more than I already had, but after witnessing some things, it feels like the world is a dystopia where victims don't get justice and corruption prevails", Alice Glass explained in a statement. On October 9, 2012, the track listing for the album was revealed via the duo's official Facebook page.

== Artwork ==
The album cover features an award-winning photograph by Spanish-born Catalan photojournalist and photographer Samuel Aranda. It shows a mother, Fatima al-Qaws embracing her son Zayed who is suffering from the effects of tear gas after taking part in a street demonstration against the then-ruling President Ali Abdullah Saleh in Sana'a, Yemen, on October 15, 2011. The photo was awarded the World Press Photo of the Year 2012 in February, 2012.

== Release and promotion ==
III was released digitally on November 7, 2012, in the United States, and the CD was released on November 8 in Australia, Canada, and the United States.

The album's first two singles, "Plague" and "Wrath of God", were made available for free download on the duo's SoundCloud page on July 25 and September 26, 2012, respectively. The accompanying music video for "Plague" debuted on September 24, 2012, and uses footage from Andrzej Żuławski's 1981 film Possession. "Affection" was released as the album's third single on October 31, 2012. The music video for "Affection" premiered on April 26, 2013, and was filmed on the duo's South American tour. "Violent Youth" premiered on Zane Lowe's BBC Radio 1 show on November 1, 2012. A music video for "Sad Eyes", shot in Berlin and Toronto, was released on January 20, 2013.

On July 26, 2012, Crystal Castles announced a North American tour with Health and Kontravoid in support of the album, as well as festivals appearances in Europe and Australia, starting on August 9, 2012, and ending on January 28, 2013. In November 2012, the band performed six dates in the United Kingdom. Additional dates across Europe, Oceania, North America, and South America were announced on October 17, 2012, and January 9, 2013. III is The Last Album to Feature Alice Glass, along with the current Roman numeral pattern

== Critical reception ==
Professional ratings
Aggregate scores
Source	Rating
AnyDecentMusic?	7.3/10
Metacritic	76/100
Review scores
Source	Rating
AllMusic	4/5 stars
The A.V. Club	C
Consequence of Sound	4/5 stars
The Guardian	4/5 stars
The Independent	4/5 stars
NME	9/10
The Observer	2/5 stars
Pitchfork	8.0/10
PopMatters	8/10
Slant Magazine	2.5/5 stars

III received generally positive reviews from music critics. At Metacritic, which assigns a weighted mean rating out of 100 to reviews from mainstream critics, the album received an average score of 76, based on 33 reviews, which indicates "generally favorable reviews". Louis Pattison of NME commented that, "in toning down the shock and awe, [Crystal Castles have] revealed the beating heart at the centre of their work. The message, still, is that the world is a cruel and fucked-up place. But being doomed seldom sounded so beautiful." AllMusic's Heather Phares viewed III as the duo's "most serious set of songs yet" and stated, "Artistic progress is as much about subtraction as it is about addition, and on III, Crystal Castles have made room to be sad, angry, pretty, and danceable at the same time." Pitchfork's Ian Cohen dubbed III "the duo's most focused record", adding, "While not as immediately striking as either Crystal Castles (I or II), the streamlined sound allows more maneuverability and subtle variety in the actual songwriting." Matt James of PopMatters wrote, "Perennial outsiders to the death, Crystal Castles' third act is inspiring, warped, feverishly uncomfortable, bold, bloody and brilliant."

Dan Pfleegor of Consequence of Sound opined that "III is less playful than the duo's previous couple of offerings, but its thematic mood is much tighter and more fully realized." The Guardian's Tim Jonze noted that "witch house is an obvious influence [on the album], and you could question whether the former chip-tune terrorists are still as ahead of the curve as they once were. It hardly matters when they can come up with stuff like 'Child I Will Hurt You', a dream-state lullaby that is both beautiful and unbearably sorrowful." Simon Price of The Independent stated that the album "shudders and shimmers like some massive, monstrous machine. But, when heard loud, the more accurate metaphors come from nature: flashes of lightning at the top end, earthquakes and landslides at the bottom." In a mixed review, Jesse Cataldo of Slant Magazine described III as "earnest, expansive electronica from a duo few are expecting such sincerity from, and it edges them directly into the middle of the road", concluding, "In striving for something new, the duo has only found a more recognizable sort of tedium." Annie Zaleski of The A.V. Club expressed that, "instead of anarchist dance jams full of crunchy 8-bit noise, (III) is more like a static-filled radio station fading in and out of range." Zaleski continued, "While (III) can use this disorientation effectively [...] too often the music is irritating, not disruptive." Hermione Hoby of The Observer felt that "there's very little on this third LP that could qualify as 'experimental'. Track after track leans heavily on the relentless four-to-the-floor of trance, with Alice Glass's yelped vocals muffled under a weight of sound that's simultaneously boring and abrasive." In 2023, the song Kerosene went viral on TikTok and is used in aviation edits.

=== Accolades ===
Publication	List	Rank
Complex	The 50 Best Albums of 2012	19
Consequence of Sound	Top 50 Albums of 2012	39
The Hype Machine	Top Ten Albums of 2012	1
NME	50 Best Albums of 2012 list	4
Pitchfork	Top 50 Albums of 2012	49
Spinner	The 50 Best Albums of 2012	34

== Commercial performance ==
The album debuted at No. 145 on Billboard 200, and No. 5 on Top Dance/Electronic Albums for charts dated November 24, 2012, selling 4,000 copies in the first week. The album reached No. 77 on Billboard 200 the following week, and No. 2 on Dance/Electronic Albums. The album has sold 52,000 copies in the United States as of August 2016.

== Track listing ==
All tracks are written by Ethan Kath and Alice Glass.

No.	Title	Length
1.	"Plague"	4:56
2.	"Kerosene"	3:12
3.	"Wrath of God"	3:07
4.	"Affection"	2:37
5.	"Pale Flesh"	3:00
6.	"Sad Eyes"	3:27
7.	"Insulin"	1:47
8.	"Transgender"	3:05
9.	"Violent Youth"	4:22
10.	"Telepath"	3:54
11.	"Mercenary"	2:39
12.	"Child I Will Hurt You"	3:33
Total length:		39:33

== Personnel ==
Credits adapted from the liner notes of III.

Crystal Castles

- Ethan Kath – production (all tracks); mixing (tracks 1–6, 8–10)
- Alice Glass – vocals

Additional personnel

- Lexxx – mixing (tracks 1–6, 8–10); vocal recording (tracks 5, 11, 12)
- Alex Bonenfant – vocal recording (tracks 1–6, 8, 10, 11)
- Jeremy Glover – vocal recording (tracks 7, 9)
- Jacknife Lee – additional production, synth (tracks 1, 6)
- Samuel Aranda – cover photograph
- Brian Gardner – mastering
- Christopher Chartrand – live drums

== Charts ==
=== Weekly charts ===
Weekly chart performance for III
Chart (2012)	Peak position
Australian Albums (ARIA)	74
Australian Dance Albums (ARIA)	7
Belgian Albums (Ultratop Flanders)	116
Belgian Albums (Ultratop Wallonia)	134
Irish Albums (IRMA)	93
Scottish Albums (Official Charts)	60
UK Albums (Official Charts)	63
US Billboard 200	77
US Top Dance Albums (Billboard)	2

=== Year-end charts ===
Year-end chart performance for III
Chart (2012)	Position
Australian Dance Albums (ARIA)	46

== Release history ==
Release dates and formats for III
Region	Date	Format	Label	Ref.
Germany	November 7, 2012	Digital download	Polydor	
Ireland	November 7, 2012	Digital download	Polydor	
United Kingdom	November 7, 2012	Digital download	Polydor	
United States	November 7, 2012	Digital download	Casablanca	
Australia	November 8, 2012	Digital download	Shock	
Canada	November 8, 2012	CD; digital download	Last Gang	
United States	November 8, 2012	CD	Casablanca; Universal Republic	
Germany	November 9, 2012	CD	Universal	
Ireland	November 9, 2012	CD	Fiction; Polydor	
United Kingdom	November 12, 2012	CD; LP	Fiction; Polydor	
Australia	November 16, 2012	CD	Shock	
Japan	December 5, 2012	CD	Universal	
United States	January 8, 2013	LP	Casablanca; Universal Republic	
