= Wrath of God (song) =

Single by Crystal Castles

from the album III
- Released: September 26, 2012
- Length: 3:06
- Label: Casablanca, Fiction, Universal Republic
- Songwriters: Alice Glass; Ethan Kath
- Producer: Ethan Kath

Crystal Castles singles chronology
"Plague" (2012)	"Wrath of God" (2012)	"Affection" (2012)

"Wrath of God" is a song by the Canadian duo Crystal Castles for their third studio album, III. It was released on September 26, 2012, as the album's second single, through Casablanca, Fiction, and Universal Republic. It was previously played on the band's shows.

Pitchfork named it the "Best New Track" at the time of its release. NME ranked it as the 44th best song of the year.
