= Control Freaks – The Remixes =

Remix album by GoodBooks
- Released: 18 November 2021
- Genre: Indie
- Label: Columbia

GoodBooks chronology
Control (2007)	Control Freaks – The Remixes (2021)

Professional ratings
Review scores
Source	Rating
NME	(6/10)

Control Freaks – The Remixes is a remix album released by British indie rock band GoodBooks, featuring remixes of songs from their debut album Control. This album was only released as a download.

== Track listing ==
1. "The Illness" (The Teenagers Mix)
2. "Leni" (Crystal Castles vs. GoodBooks)
3. "Turn It Back" (Freaks Mix)
4. "Leni" (Kissy Sell Out Remix)
5. "Passchendaele" (Minotaur Shock More Faithful Remix)
6. "Walk with Me" (Subsource Remix)
7. "Turn It Back" (Lo-Fi-Fnk Mature Remix)
8. "The Illness" (Herve Dub Remix)
9. "Passchendaele" (KGB Remix)
