= Plague (song) =

Single by Crystal Castles

from the album III
- Released: June 9, 2012
- Length: 4:56
- Label: Fiction; Polydor
- Songwriters: Ethan Kath; Alice Glass
- Producer: Ethan Kath

Crystal Castles singles chronology
| "Not in Love" (2010) | "Plague" (2012) | "Wrath of God" (2012) |

"Plague" is a song recorded by the Canadian electronic music duo Crystal Castles. It is the first single of the band's 2012 album, (III). On June 9, 2012, it was made available for free download on the duo's SoundCloud page.

== History ==
The song debuted at the band's live performance at Parklife Festival in Manchester, England, in June 2012. The band posted a SoundCloud link to the song on their Facebook page July 25, 2012, without providing any further information about the song or the next album. The release date of the album was eventually announced with the release of the next single, "Wrath of God", on June 6, 2012.

== Critical reception ==
The song mostly received positive reviews. Jason Lipshutz of Billboard magazine wrote: "Consisting of three movements between calm, ethereal verses and an assault of synthesizers and programmed drums on the refrain, "Plague" obscures Glass' lyrics as her voice tries to overpower an avalanche of noise." Tom Breihan of Stereogum called the song "their [Crystal Castles'] latest bit of bloodthirsty gothed-out dance music," while stating that "it will doubtless sound amazing the next time you see them in some dank cavern of a venue." Marc Hogan of Spin magazine contrasted the song with the previous album, inferring that the band is interested in "strobe lights and strangulated screams, not synchronized lanterns or future-R&B lullabies." Jamie Fullerton of NME noted "the ominous thump and nasty bass, plus eerie silences that act like post-apocalyptic drops", also further commenting that the band still sounds "dangerous, demented and utterly thrilling" with their new song. In his elaborative track review, Dean Lucas of This Is Fake DIY called the song "almost a modern day interpretation of the 'O Fortuna' movement of Carl Orff's 'Carmina Burana' as the drama builds thanks to an ominous-sounding beginning to a frighteningly huge catharsis." He also described Alice Glass' vocals as "sounding like a threat of suicide thanks to her petulant psycho-brat charm," while writing that "quieter build-up to its gothic chorus drenched in black keys is both immediately oppressive and haunting." To conclude his assessment of the song, he stated that "the song feels different to their previous efforts, as by their own standards, it's much more of a slow burner."

== Music video ==
The music video was released on September 24, 2012. It was originally directed as a fan-made video by Ivan Grbin, before being released as an official music video. It features footage from Andrzej Żuławski's 1981 horror film, Possession.

== Personnel ==
- Ethan Kath – production, mixing
- Alice Glass – vocals
- Alex Bonenfant – vocal engineering
- Brian Gardner – mastering
- Jacknife Lee – synthesizer
- Lexxx – mixing
