= TMDP =

Canadian electronic music duo

- Origin: Toronto, Ontario, Canada
- Genres: Electronic
- Years active: 2009–present

TMDP is a Canadian electronic music duo based in Toronto, Ontario. TMDP's particular brand of electronic music is recreated for the stage using synthesizers and laptops.

== History ==
Jeffrey Addison and Gavin Rough, who had been playing together informally, formed TMDP with the help of promoter Craig Hill. The pair began performing in clubs and bars in Toronto; they released their self-titled debut album in 2009 through Hill's newly formed YYZ Records. On the national campus and community radio report, the album of dance music charted number 18 of the top 20 electronic albums that year.

TMDP were a part of Toronto's burgeoning electronic music scene of 2008/2009 and have played with Modeselektor, Dragonette, Ubiquitous Synergy Seeker, A-Trak, Aeroplane, and toured with fellow Canadian dance punk/electro group, Shout Out Out Out Out. Also in 2009, TMDP, along with Crystal Castles, performed at Toronto's Sound Academy as part of the TIME Festival.

In November 2009, TMDP remixed the single, "Self Taught Learner" by Lissy Trullie. The release enjoyed moderate success featuring on RCRDLBL, as well as being released by Hugo Boss on their December 2009 monthly mix series.

== Discography ==
=== Albums ===
- TMDP (2009)
