= Frail (Crystal Castles song) =

Single by Crystal Castles

from the album Amnesty (I)
- Published: April 17, 2015
- Released: May 11, 2015
- Genre: Electropop; electropunk; witch house; experimental
- Length: 2:48
- Label: Fiction
- Songwriter: Ethan Kath
- Producer: Ethan Kath

Crystal Castles singles chronology
"Affection" (2012)	"Frail" (2015)	"Deicide" (2015)

"Frail" is a song by Canadian electronic music band, Crystal Castles. It is the first single of the band's 2016 album, Amnesty (I). On April 17, 2015, it was made available for free download on the duo's SoundCloud page.

== History ==
On April 17, 2015, Ethan Kath shared a new track titled "Frail" on soundcloud, writing 'this is Edith on vocals'. The track was released digitally on iTunes a month later on May 11.

== Personnel ==
- Ethan Kath – production, mixing
- Edith Frances – vocals
- Alex Zelenka – engineer
- Samuel Jacob – engineer
- Patrick Mundy – mix
- Brian Gardner – master
- Au Vyst – artwork
