= Baptism (Crystal Castles song) =

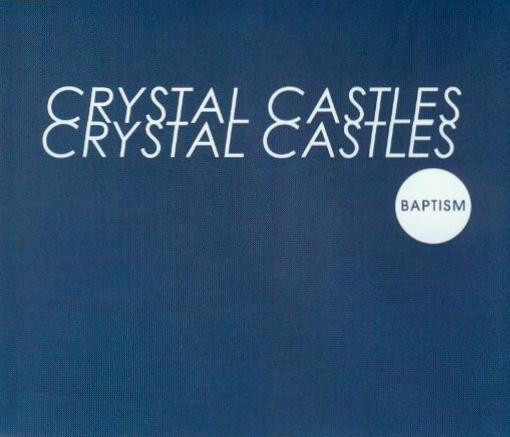

Single by Crystal Castles

from the album Crystal Castles
- Released: July 26, 2010
- Length: 4:13 (album version); 3:38 (radio edit)
- Label: Fiction; Last Gang
- Songwriters: Crystal Castles; Luke Leeder
- Producers: Ethan Kath; Jacknife Lee

Crystal Castles singles chronology
"Doe Deer" (2010)	"Baptism" (2010)	"Not in Love" (2010)

"Baptism" is a song by the Canadian duo Crystal Castles for their second studio album, Crystal Castles (2010). It was released on July 26, 2010, through Fiction and Last Gang as the third and final single from the album.

== Background and release ==
Crystal Castles wrote "Baptism" for their second studio album, Crystal Castles (2010); according to a press release, the album was recorded at "an Icelandic church, a Canadian cabin, and a Detroit garage". "Baptism" was written by Crystal Castles members Ethan Kath and Alice Glass, along with Luke Leeder. It was produced by Kath and Jacknife Lee. It was released on July 26, 2010 through Fiction and Last Gang as the third and final single from the album. An accompanying music video was released on October 8. Crystal Castles performed the song at Jimmy Kimmel Live! in December.

"Baptism" entered two charts by the Official Charts Company: the Scottish Singles Chart at 87 and the UK Dance Singles Chart at 16.

== Track listing ==
UK promo CD

- Baptism (radio edit) – 3:38

Germany promo CD

- Baptism (radio edit) – 3:38
- Baptism (No Age remix) – 4:16
- Baptism (Rory Phillips remix) – 5:10
- Baptism (Punks Jump Up remix) – 5:00

== Personnel ==
Adapted from the CD liner notes.

- Ethan Kath – writer, producer
- Alice Glass – writer
- Luke Leeder – writer
- Jacknife Lee – producer
- Alex Bonenfant – vocal recording
- Lexxx – mixing
- Nilesh Patel – mastering

== Charts ==
Chart performance for "Baptism"
Chart (2010)	Peak position
Scottish Singles Sales (Official Charts)	87
UK Dance (Official Charts)	16
