= Gutter Days =

EP by Cheerleadër 666
- Released: 2003
- Recorded: 2001
- Genre: Punk rock, heavy metal, hard rock
- Length: 21:00
- Label: Sonico Records
- Producer: Cheerleadër 666

Cheerleadër 666 chronology
Go (2001)	Gutter Days (2003)	All Hail (2004)

Gutter Days is a 2003 10" vinyl EP re-release of Kïll Cheerleadër's second demo CD, originally released in 2001.

Some CD-R versions of "Gutter Days" included a cover of the Ramones song, "I Just Wanna Have Something to Do". Four of the seven songs found on this EP were re-recorded (and in some instances also renamed) for their 2004 debut full-length album, All Hail.

== Track listing ==
1. "R.N.R."
2. "Don't Call Me Baby, Baby"
3. "Nikki"
4. "I Want Action"
5. "Straight To Hell"
6. "Shit City"

All songs arranged by Cheerleadër 666

== Personnel ==
- Ethan Deth - Vocals, Bass
- Cobra (Anthony Useless, T. War) - Vocals, Guitar
- Dallas MacKinnon (Chad MacKinnon) - Lead Guitar
- Jimmy Nova - Drums

== Cover art ==
The cover art for the album is a picture of Peter Fonda from the movie The Wild Angels. It was taken from the back cover of the soundtrack LP of that 1966 movie.

== Album reviews ==
- Sleazegrinder, November 2003 review
