= Robin Black =

Canadian singer and MMA analyst

- Born: August 10, 1969 (age 57); Pinawa, Manitoba, Canada
- Occupation: Martial arts commentator
- Notable credit(s): Karate Combat; WLC; TSN; CBS; UFC
- Children: 2

Robin Black is a Canadian combat analyst and sports commentator. He formerly competed in mixed martial arts, and previously had a career as a glam rock musician. Robin Black has commentated for most major combat sports organizations in the world such as Bellator MMA, ONE Championship, Brave Combat Federation, Karate Combat, World Lethwei Championship in Myanmar and ACB in Russia.

== Career ==
=== Music career ===
Black grew up in Pinawa, Manitoba, before moving to Winnipeg after high school. In Winnipeg he formed the band Ballroom Zombies in the mid-1990s, before moving to Toronto in 1998 to form Robin Black and the Intergalactic Rock Stars.

According to Black, he went around Toronto confidently boasting that he was going to be a rock star before he even actually had a band, and was forced to hastily assemble a band when his bluffing got him invited to perform at Canadian Music Week in 1999. The original band members included guitarist Stacey Stray, bassist Killer Ky Anto, keyboardist Chris "Starboy" Cunnane, and drummer Kevin "K-Tron" Taylor, while Black himself was sometimes billed as Robin Fucking Black.

The band released their first recording, the two-song "Time Travel Tonight"/"More Effeminate Than You", as a novelty CD single cut in the shape of a star in 2000. The album Planet Fame, produced by Moe Berg and Garth Richardson, followed on February 14, 2002. It was filled with glam rock tracks, led by the single "So Sick of You", and was supported by a national tour. According to Black, "we've never hidden the fact that we want to be the filthy, beer-drinking, chick-fucking Beatles of the 21st century. You've got Edwin on one hand or you have Robin Black & the Intergalactic Rock Stars on the other. This is an easy choice to make. I mean, is Raine Maida really going to make you a better person? I don't think so."

Black made an appearance on Showcase's TV series KinK in 2002.

Prior to the release of their second album, the band brought in two new members, Chris "The Kidd" Avolos on drums and John "The Creep" Kerns on bass. The 2005 album was named Instant Classic, and was produced by Bob Ezrin along with Garth Richardson. For this release the band's name was shortened to just Robin Black. They toured extensively for this release, including internationally.

In 2006, while touring in UK, Black suffered a drug-induced seizure. For almost two minutes, Black’s body jerked and he was unable to speak. The seizure was attributed to Black's lack of sleep, alcohol and drug use such as speed.

Black became a judge on the Much Music show VJ Search.

=== Mixed martial arts ===
In 2007, Black pitched a new reality series to Much Music called Fearless or Stupid, which would have featured Black performing dangerous stunts, highlighting his new training regime, and culminating in his first MMA fight. At the age of 36, Black started competing as a mixed martial artist after attaining a second degree black belt in Tae Kwon Do. Although he had been a hobby martial artist throughout his career, he attributed his decision to start actively competing in MMA to the seizure incident forcing him to clean up many aspects of his life and take his health more seriously.

"I couldn't go through life getting weaker, and dumber, and sicker. I didn't want to be having seizures on weird couches in the UK. I knew that I needed to prioritize being healthy. I stopped drinking for almost a year. I started to work out three times a week [...] Then I started training martial arts."

In 2009, MuchMusic aired a one-off documentary special Robin Black: Cage Fighter, which featured Black training with mixed martial artists Georges St-Pierre, Sam Stout, and Mark Hominick.

=== Sports commentating ===
In 2008, Black was guest commentator at an XMMA show in Montreal featuring David Loiseau. This marked the first time that Robin did color commentary for fights. Robin eventually started interviewing fighters between rounds at local and provincial events such as Warrior-1 MMA - Inception, WRECK MMA, CFC and others. In 2009, Black submitted opponent Stephane Poirier to becoming Champion in Canada's ELITE 1 MMA promotion. On November 30, 2012, Robin returned to the cage at the inaugural SLAMM: Tristar Fights event, submitting opponent Derek Charbonneau via Kimura armlock in the 2nd round. "What would be the one thing that, to me, would be more exciting and more thrilling and more authentically who I am as a person than being a rock star? And the answer was, 'I want to be a UFC commentator in 10 years,'"said Black. In 2018, Brave Combat Federation signed Black as the lead fight analyst and joined Karate Combat in 2021. Black is known for his signature word Bink!.

==== Lethwei ====
On August 2, 2019, Black was invited to be commentator for the World Lethwei Championship at WLC 9: King of Nine Limbs in Mandalay, Myanmar. The event was streamed on UFC Fight Pass. He won the Lethwei World "Lethwei Analyst of the Year" for his performance at WLC 9. The event also won Best Sport Program at the Asian Academy Awards. On November 7, 2020, Black commentated the rematch between Dave Leduc and Cyrus Washington held at the Outlaw Saloon in Cheyenne, Wyoming.

== Music ==
- Robin Black - vocals
- Peter Arvidsson - lead guitar, backing vocals
- Chris "Starboy" Cunnane - guitar, backing vocals
- Robby Ruckus (who also plays in Darlings of Chelsea) - bass
- Aaron Verdonk - Drums (who also plays in Stereos)

=== Robin Black and the Intergalactic Rock Stars ===
(1998–2002)

- Robin Black - lead vocals
- Stacy Stray - lead guitar, backing vocals
- Chris "Starboy" Cunnane - guitar, keyboards, backing vocals
- Jackie Duncan - bass (May–September 1998)
- Killer Ky Anto - bass (September 1998–May 2002)
- Kevin Taylor aka K-Tron - drums

(2002–2003)

- Robin Black - lead vocals
- Killer Ky Anto - lead guitar, backing vocals
- Chris "Starboy" Cunnane - guitar, keyboards, backing vocals
- B.B. McQueen - bass
- Kevin Taylor - drums

(2003–2006)

- Robin Black - lead vocals
- Killer Ky Anto - lead guitar, backing vocals
- Chris "Starboy" Cunnane - guitar, keyboards, backing vocals
- John "The Creep" Kerns - bass
- Chris "The Kid" Avolos - drums

== Discography ==
=== Albums ===
- Planet:Fame – 2002
- Instant Classic – 2005

=== Singles ===
- "Time Travel Tonight"/"More Effeminate Than You" – 2000
- "So Sick of You" – 2002
- "Some Of You Boys (And Most of You Girls)" – 2002
- "Time Travel Tonight" – 2002
- "Take Myself Away" – 2002
- "Hellraiser" – 2003
- "We See Right Through Ya" – 2005
- Why Don't You Love Me? – 2005

=== DVDs ===
- We Came, We Saw...We Came! – 2002

== Awards and recognition ==
- Lethwei World
  - 2019 Analyst of the year
- Spia Asia Awards
  - 2019 Best Sport Tourism Destination Campaign of the Year - Bronze Commentator at WLC 9
- Asian Academy Awards
  - 2019 Best Sport Program - National Winner Commentator at WLC 9

== Mixed martial arts record ==
Professional record breakdown
9 matches	4 wins	5 losses
By knockout	1	1
By submission	3	4

Res.	Record	Opponent	Method	Event	Date	Round	Time	Location	Notes
Win	4–5	Derek Charbonneau	Submission (kimura)	Slamm 1 - Garcia vs. Lamarche	Nov 30, 2012	2	2:34	Montreal, Quebec, Canada	
Loss	3–5	Mike Reilly	Submission (armbar)	Wreck MMA - Strong and Proud	Jan 28, 2011	1	0:57	Casino du Lac-Leamy, Gatineau, Quebec, Canada	
Loss	3–4	Eric Perez	TKO (punches)	CFC - Canadian Fighting Championship 5	Jun 4, 2010	1	1:23	Winnipeg Convention Centre, Winnipeg, Manitoba, Canada	
Win	3–3	Matt Knysh	TKO (punches)	AMMA 2 - Vengeance	Feb 5, 2010	2	1:20	Edmonton Expo Centre, Edmonton, Alberta, Canada	
Loss	2–3	Corey Lautischer	Submission (guillotine choke)	AMMA 1 - First Blood	Oct 24, 2009	1	0:31	Edmonton Expo Centre, Edmonton, Alberta, Canada	
Win	2–2	Stephane Poirier	Submission (rear-naked choke)	Elite 1 - Never Back Down	Jul 25, 2009	1	1:31	Moncton, New Brunswick, Canada	
Win	1–2	Stephane Poirier	Submission (triangle choke)	CFC - Canadian Fighting Championship 1	Feb 6, 2009	1	2:57	Winnipeg, Manitoba, Canada	
Loss	0–2	Janz Stein	Submission (rear-naked choke)	UCW 14 - November to Remember	Nov 28, 2008	1	1:36	Winnipeg, Manitoba, Canada	
Loss	0–1	Chris Myra	Submission (triangle choke)	Freedom Fight - Title Quest	Jul 26, 2008	2	1:15	Gatineau, Quebec, Canada	
