= Crystal Castles (2010 album) =

Studio album by Crystal Castles

Studio album by Crystal Castles
- Released: April 23, 2010
- Genre: Synth-pop; noise pop; experimental
- Length: 52:54
- Label: Fiction; Lies; Last Gang; Polydor
- Producer: Alex Bonenfant; Paul Epworth; Ethan Kath; Jacknife Lee

Crystal Castles chronology
| Crystal Castles (2008) | Crystal Castles (2010) | III (2012) |

Singles from Crystal Castles
- 1. "Celestica" Released: April 16, 2010; 2. "Doe Deer" Released: April 17, 2010; 3. "Baptism" Released: July 26, 2010

Crystal Castles (Note: Sometimes referred to as Crystal Castles II, stylized Crystal Castles (II).) is the second studio album by the Canadian electronic music duo Crystal Castles, released on May 24, 2010, by Fiction Records and Last Gang Records. The album was initially scheduled for release on June 7, 2010; however, the release dates were moved forward after the album leaked online, thus a digital version of the album was released on April 23, 2010.

On April 25, 2011, the album was reissued digitally under the title II (stylized as (II)), which replaced the original version of "Not in Love" with the version featuring Robert Smith (of the Cure).

== Background ==
"Celestica"
Critics cited the song as a shift from Crystal Castles' usual sound, presenting a pop sound and resembling shoegaze.

Crystal Castles was recorded by Ethan Kath in a variety of locations including an abandoned church in Iceland, a self-built cabin in northern Ontario, a garage behind an abandoned drug store in Detroit, as well as Paul Epworth's London studio. Of the experience, Kath said, "I recorded most of the record in the coldest winter in decades in a church without heat in Iceland. It was so cold that when I listen back I can hear myself shivering. I chose it because it felt right". In December 2009, Kath gave vocalist Alice Glass a CD-R containing 70 instrumental tracks, for which she then recorded vocals on 35 tracks.

In order to promote the album, the band released the first single "Celestica" in April followed by an EP titled Doe Deer that was released only a few days later. In May the band physically released the album. The album reached number 48 on the UK Albums Chart and number 188 on the US Billboard 200. Later on in December, the single version of "Not in Love", featuring guest vocals from Robert Smith of the Cure, was released. The single became Crystal Castles' highest-charting single to date.

== Critical reception ==
Professional ratings
Aggregate scores
| Source | Rating |
|---|---|
| AnyDecentMusic? | 7.2/10 |
| Metacritic | 77/100 |
Review scores
| Source | Rating |
| AllMusic | 4/5 stars |
| Billboard | 4.5/5 stars |
| The Guardian | 3/5 stars |
| Los Angeles Times | 3/4 stars |
| NME | 7/10 |
| Pitchfork | 8.5/10 |
| Q | 3/5 stars |
| Spin | 8/10 |
| The Times | 4/5 stars |
| Uncut | 3/5 stars |

Crystal Castles received generally positive reviews from music critics. At Metacritic, which assigns a weighted mean rating out of 100 to reviews from mainstream critics, the album received an average score of 77, based on 24 reviews, which indicates "generally favorable reviews". Daniel Brockman of The Boston Phoenix praised the band for creating "a dense-yet-airy thicket of pure pop transcendence." MusicOMH also gave an extremely positive review, describing the album as "bold, dramatic, more than a little screwed-up and stunningly exciting statement." Pitchfork rated the album 8.5 out of 10, and awarded it their "Best New Music" accolade.

== Commercial performance ==
In February 2012, Crystal Castles released a fashion video using some of the songs in their album's track list and featuring singer Alice Glass in collaboration with Vs. magazine.

As of July 2012, Crystal Castles' first and second studio albums had sold a combined 174,000 copies in the United States, according to Nielsen SoundScan.

=== Accolades ===
The album was a longlisted nominee for the 2010 Polaris Music Prize.

| Publication | List | Rank |
|---|---|---|
| Drowned in Sound | Albums of the Year 2010 | 18 |
| musicOMH | Top 50 Albums of 2010 | 33 |
| NME | 75 Best Albums of 2010 | 31 |
| Pitchfork | The Top 50 Albums of 2010 | 34 |
| Pitchfork | The 100 Best Albums of the Decade So Far (2010–2014) | 65 |
| PopMatters | The 70 Best Albums of 2010 | 51 |
| Rough Trade | Albums of the Year (2010) | 35 |
| Slant Magazine | The 25 Best Albums of 2010 | 6 |
| Slant Magazine | The 100 Best Albums of the 2010s | 69 |
| Spin | The 40 Best Albums of 2010 | 21 |
| Stereogum | Top 50 Albums of 2010 | 12 |

== Track listing ==
| No. | Title | Writer(s) | Producer(s) | Length |
|---|---|---|---|---|
| 1. | "Fainting Spells" | Ethan Kath; Alice Glass | Kath | 2:44 |
| 2. | "Celestica" | Kath; Glass | Kath; Paul Epworth^{[a]} | 3:48 |
| 3. | "Doe Deer" | Kath; Glass | Kath | 1:38 |
| 4. | "Baptism" | Kath; Glass; Luke Leeder | Kath; Jacknife Lee | 4:13 |
| 5. | "Year of Silence" | Kath; Sigur Rós | Kath | 4:54 |
| 6. | "Empathy" | Kath; Glass | Kath; Alex Bonenfant | 4:11 |
| 7. | "Suffocation" | Kath; Glass | Kath; Lee | 4:02 |
| 8. | "Violent Dreams" | Kath; Stina Nordenstam | Kath | 4:35 |
| 9. | "Vietnam" | Kath; Nordenstam | Kath; Lee | 5:08 |
| 10. | "Birds" | Kath; Glass | Kath | 2:31 |
| 11. | "Pap Smear" | Kath; Glass | Kath | 3:43 |
| 12. | "Not in Love" | Mark Holmes | Kath; Lee | 3:33 |
| 13. | "Intimate" | Kath; Glass | Kath | 4:45 |
| 14. | "I Am Made of Chalk" | Kath | Kath; Epworth^{[b]} | 3:09 |

Big Day Out edition bonus tracks
| No. | Title | Length |
|---|---|---|
| 15. | "Not in Love" (featuring Robert Smith from The Cure) | 3:48 |
| 16. | "Celestica" (Bear in Heaven Remix) | 3:29 |
| 17. | "Celestica" (Thurston Moore Remix) | 3:51 |
| 18. | "Baptism" (No Age Remix) | 4:18 |
| 19. | "Baptism" (Punks Jump Up Remix) | 5:03 |
| 20. | "Suffocation" (Memory Tapes Remix) | 5:09 |
| 21. | "Mother Knows Best" | 2:01 |
| 22. | "Insectica" | 1:49 |
| 23. | "Seed" | 1:44 |

Notes

- ^{^[a]} signifies an additional producer.
- ^{^[b]} signifies an additional vocal producer.

Sample credits

- "Year of Silence" contains a sample of "Inní mér syngur vitleysingur" by Sigur Rós.
- "Vietnam" and "Violent Dreams" contain a sample of "A Walk in the Park" by Stina Nordenstam.

== Personnel ==
Credits adapted from the liner notes of Crystal Castles.

Crystal Castles

- Ethan Kath – production (all tracks); mixing (tracks 2, 3, 12–14)
- Alice Glass – vocals

Additional personnel

- Lexxx – vocal recording (track 1); mixing (tracks 1, 4–11)
- Paul Epworth – additional production, vocal recording (track 2); guitar solo recording (track 10); additional vocal production (track 14)
- Matthew Wagner – vocal recording (track 3)
- Jacknife Lee – production (tracks 4, 7, 9, 12)
- Alex Bonenfant – vocal recording (tracks 4, 7, 10, 11); production (track 6); mixing (tracks 7, 13); guitar recording (track 10); drum recording (track 13)
- Christopher Chartrand – drum solo (track 13); live drums
- X Tecumseh Clark – cover model
- Todd Tamanend Clark – photograph
- Marc Pannozzo – band photo
- Nilesh Patel – mastering

== Charts ==
Chart performance for Crystal Castles
| Chart (2010) | Peak position |
|---|---|
| Australian Albums (ARIA) | 25 |
| Irish Albums (IRMA) | 56 |
| Scottish Albums (Official Charts) | 54 |
| UK Albums (Official Charts) | 48 |
| UK Dance Albums (Official Charts) | 8 |
| US Billboard 200 | 188 |
| US Top Dance Albums (Billboard) | 6 |
