= Ingrid Guardiola =

Spanish director, producer and cultural essayist

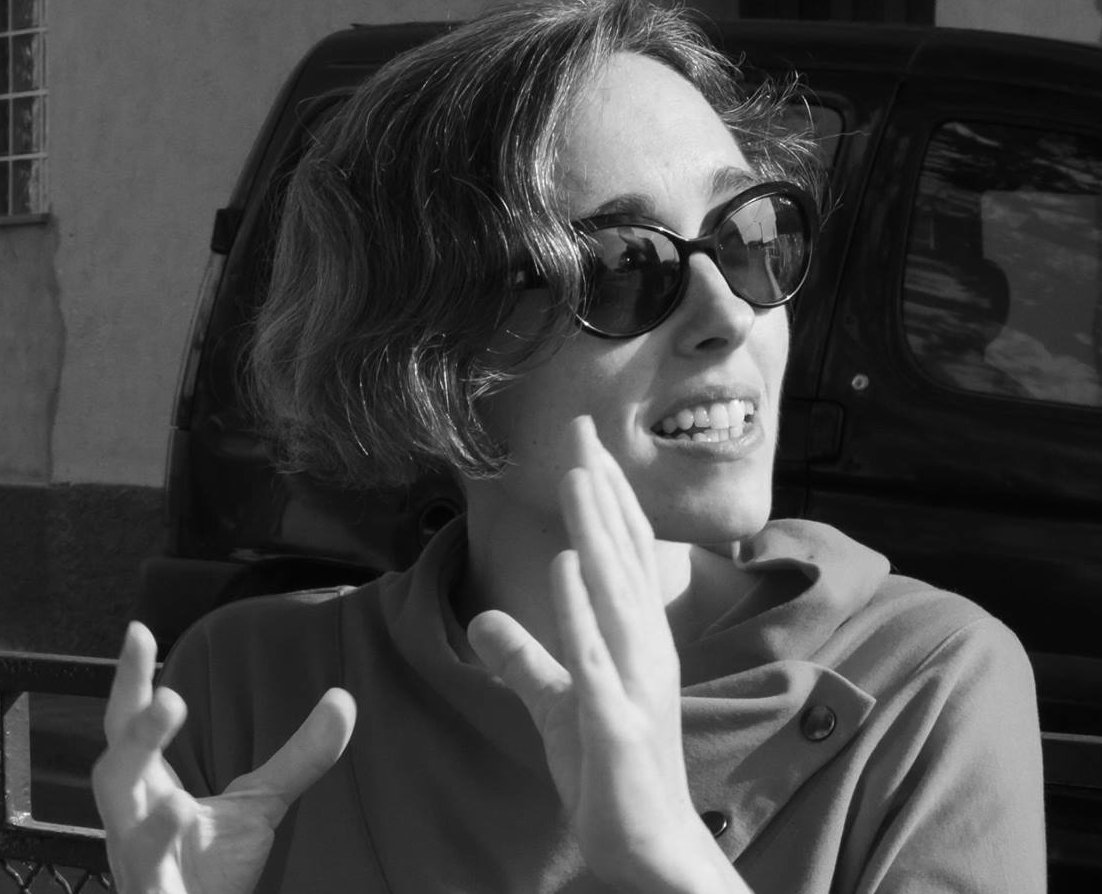
- Ingrid Guardiola
- Born: Ingrid Guardiola Sánchez; 1980 (age 45–46); Girona, Spain
- Occupations: Director; producer; essayist
- Years active: 21st century
- Notable work: "L'ull i la navalla: un assaig sobre el món com a interfície"

Ingrid Guardiola Sánchez (Girona, 1980) is a Catalan filmmaker, producer, and cultural essayist. Between 2021 and 2025, she was the director of Bòlit, Contemporary Art Center of Girona.

== Career ==
Ingrid Guardiola holds a PhD in Humanities from Pompeu Fabra University; she has been an associate professor at the University of Girona since 2010 and, since 2025, has been a lecturer for the Cultural Communication degree at the same university. Her work focuses on audiovisual culture linked to inequality, technology, gender, and culture.

=== Management ===
She served as the director and manager of Bòlit, the contemporary art center of Girona, from 2021 to 2025. She coordinated MINIPUT (Quality Television Showcase) from 2002 to 2018. From 2016 to 2020, she was a member of the Executive Committee of the Culture Council of the Barcelona City Council, and was also a member of the Advisory Board of Teatre Lliure under the direction of Juan Carlos Martel, a member of the Board of Trustees of Hangar, and of the Governing Board of L'Auditori concerta hall in Barcelona. From 2001 to 2020, she collaborated with the Centre de Cultura Contemporània de Barcelona (CCCB), her final project there being Soy Cámara, an audiovisual essay project that aired from 2010 to 2015 on La2 of TVE and has been on YouTube since 2015. She has participated in various initiatives, most notably: TVLata and the TVE Cultural Channel.

She is one of the promoters of www.pioneresdelcinema.cat, a project researching female film professionals, and has worked at various film festivals such as the Sitges Film Festival.

=== Outreach ===
Over recent years, she has given lectures and courses at various national and international centers. She has collaborated with media outlets such as the CCMA on programs like "Planta Baixa," "Els matins," "Il·luminats," "Nervi," "Quatre Gats," "Amb Filosofia", and "L'hora del lector". She has published articles in various publishing houses and national newspapers. She was a columnist and member of the advisory board for the Cultura/s supplement of La Vanguardia from 2011 to 2014 and currently writes for the opinion section of Diari Ara.

=== Exhibitions ===
She has curated or participated in the exhibitions «Vendrán las mujeres» (2025, with Mita Casacuberta and Anna Maria Iglesias, Museo Cabañas in Guadalajara, Mexico), «Brutal/Feral: Architectures of survival» (2025, Bòlit, curatorial support for Andrés Hispano), «Holes to make a requiem» (2024, Bòlit), «Aporias on air» (2024, Bòlit, with Olga Subirós), «How the skin opens without a dagger» (2024, Embarrat), «Spilling the shadow: Pep Aymerich» (2024, Vilabertran Canonry), «Growing plants in the dark» (2023), «My body knows unheard songs, the flesh speaks true, I am spacious flesh that sings» (2023, Bòlit, finalist for the ACCA awards for best curatorship), «That is to say: Mim Juncà and Alícia Voguel» (2023, Vilabertran Canonry), «Setting the table: Tura Sanglas, Isabel Banal» (2022, Vilabertran Canonry), «Insectodrome» (2022, Bòlit), «Towards the springs: a fluvial grammar» (2021, Bòlit, finalist for the ACCA awards for best curatorship), «Radiomensió» (El Prat de Llobregat 2009, IDENSITAT project), «The little-known dimension: Pioneers of cinema» (Cinema Museum, 2014) and «Terralab» (2016-2018, MUME, Museum of L'Empordà).

== Works ==
=== Filmography ===
In 2017, she released her first feature film, Casa de ningú (Nobody's House), a docu-essay reflecting on memory, productivity, and labor using two aging communities as references: a retirement home in a Barcelona neighborhood and a former mining colony in León. The film was featured at the Gijón International Film Festival, the Guadalajara International Film Festival in Mexico, and the D'A Film Festival Barcelona, among others.

=== Essays ===
In 2018, she published L'ull i la navalla (The Eye and the Razor), an essay on the world as an interface, in which she reflects on how the contemporary dynamic of permanent digital hyper-connection has blurred the public and private worlds, and the relationship between technology and work. Simultaneously, Guardiola questions "the idea that the future of the economy must inevitably pass through technological innovation and its derivatives."

In 2020, she published Fils (Threads), which includes an epistolary dialogue with Marta Segarra between September 2019 and May 2020. In 2025, she published La servitud dels protocols (The Servitude of Protocols) (Arcàdia), about how technosocial protocols—both computer-based and bureaucratic—influence how we construct our identities, social relationships, and our relationship with time, space, and the construction of desire.

In 2025, she published Marge de maniobra (Room for Maneuver), an essay where she explains her project at Bòlit and the importance of operating, tactically, from historical, territorial, social, anthropological, and artistic margins. In 2026 she published Feminisme gòtic with Núria Gómez Gabriel.

== Awards ==
- 2019 - Serra d'Or Critics' Award for Essay for L'ull i la navalla
