= Celestica (song) =

Single by Crystal Castles

from the album Crystal Castles
- Released: April 16, 2010
- Genre: Dream pop
- Length: 3:50
- Label: Fiction; Lies; Last Gang; Polydor
- Songwriter: Crystal Castles
- Producer: Ethan Kath

Crystal Castles singles chronology
"Vanished" (2008)	"Celestica" (2010)	"Doe Deer" (2010)

"Celestica" is a song by the Canadian duo Crystal Castles for their second studio album, Crystal Castles (2010). Polydor Records released it as the album's lead single (Note: The single is also considered an EP.) on April 16, 2010, a day after its premiere on BBC Radio 1. A music video recorded at the Abney Park Cemetery was released in June. The song was written by members Ethan Kath and Alice Glass, with production handled by Kath. According to him, "Celestica" was inspired by a suicide at Celestica, a Canadian electronics company.

Critics cited the song as a shift from Crystal Castles' usual noisy sound, instead presenting a pop sound that resembled shoegaze. Others highlighted its melody and member Alice Glass's vocals. NME considered it one of the best songs of the year, while Pitchfork named it as one of the best tracks between 2010 and 2014 and among the best Crystal Castles songs.

== Background ==
Crystal Castles, composed of Alice Glass and Ethan Kath, wrote "Celestica" for their second studio album, Crystal Castles (2010). According to a press release, the album was recorded at "an Icelandic church, a Canadian cabin, and a Detroit garage". Kath said that the track was inspired by a suicide at Celestica, a Canadian electronics manufacturing services company. According to Kath, a worker reportedly jumped into a vat of hot plastic, which was then rumoured to still be used in manufacturing products. Kath produced the song, with vocals provided by Glass. Paul Epworth did additional production. Kath did mixing for the album version, while Cenzo Townshend mixed it for the radio edit single. The song was mastered by Nilesh Patel for the album.

== Composition ==
"Celestica"
Critics cited the song as a shift from Crystal Castles' usual noisy sound, instead presenting a pop sound that resembled shoegaze.

"Celestica" is in the key of B minor and has a speed of 126 beats per minute. Multiple critics described "Celestica" as a shift in Crystal Castles' usual glitchy and noisy sound; Molly Beauchemin of Pitchfork said that the song is "more muted" when compared to their other songs. Larry Fitzmaurice of Pitchfork compared it to Crystal Castles' "Courtship Dating" (2008), but with its "buzzy, brain-addling riff" replaced with "stadium-sized synths and a throbbing house heart". NME writers described the instrumental as a "Moloko-style anthemic pop house". Pitchfork's Ian Cohen and Jay Hill of Tiny Mix Tapes said that the track resembled shoegaze, with Hill comparing it to Galaxie 500 and Ride. Ben Rayner of The Toronto Star characterized it as dream pop, while The Bangor Daily News's Travis Gass compared it to the noise pop present in My Bloody Valentine's 1991 album Loveless.

Multiple reviewers highlighted the melody of "Celestica"; Rebecca Schiller of NME described it as "sweepingly melodic", with Crystal Castles "embracing simple, calm beauty". She said that the song presents "spacious spirituality". Eric Torres wrote to Pitchfork that the track combines member Alice Glass's "gorgeous melody" with Kath's "cavernous synths and scraping guitars". DJ Zane Lowe of BBC Radio 1 described it as a "deep club and longing melody", which was unusual for the band. The Guardian's Michael Hann compared "Celestica" to "those swooning, melancholy European faux-classical melodies" of Pet Shop Boys and described it as the most pop-centric of the Crystal Castles album.

Regarding Glass's vocals on "Celestica", Los Angeles Times writer August Brown described them as a delicate alto reminiscent of Hope Sandoval, while Emily Mackay of NME compared her soft singing to the one in Delerium's "Silence". The Quietus's Emily Bick felt they were similar to vocals by Ladytron and Lady Gaga. Billboard staff said that Glass "glides sensitively" with her vocals, while Mosi Reeves of Spin wrote that she "coos seductively". Heather Phares wrote to AllMusic that the song "puts the focus on Glass's decidedly clear, melancholy vocals and the four-on-the-floor beat". PopMatters's Mehan Jayasuriya wrote that, with Glass being "stripped of the vocal effects for which she is known", she "sounds approachable—innocent, even", calling it a "disarming moment".

== Release and reception ==
"Celestica" was premiered by BBC Radio 1 on April 15, 2010. It was digitally released as a single a day later through Polydor Records, along with the 2004 demos "Insectica", "Seed", and "Mother Knows Best". A radio edit was released on May 31 through Fiction, Lies, and Last Gang in the United Kingdom. The song received remixes by Sonic Youth member Thurston Moore on June 2 and American band Bear in Heaven on June 9. A music video for "Celestica" was released on June 22, 2010. Directed by Ethan Kath and Rob Hawkins, the clip showcases children from the London College of Music playing violins and interacting playfully in London's Abney Park Cemetery. At the same time, Glass lip-syncs the song while Kath applies mud to his face. In September, Crystal Castles performed the song live at the Grand Central in Miami.

"Celestica" was generally well received by critics. Naming it the "Best New Track" at the time of its release, Pitchfork's Larry Fitzmaurice described it as "a stone-cold beauty of a song", while Andrzej Lukowski of Drowned in Sound called it "a pretty polished piece of music". Molly Beauchemin of Pitchfork felt it was an "excellent counterpart" to "Doe Deer", which follows "Celestica" on the Crystal Castles album, while also considering it a "gorgeous, harmonious classic". August Brown of the Los Angeles Times described it as "fantastic" and "a delicate and unexpectedly moving single", while The New York Times's Nate Chinen called it "a disarmingly sweet-tempered single". NME named it the 19th best track of 2010, while Rayner considered it one of the best Canadian songs of the year. In 2014, Pitchfork named it the 89th best track of the 2010–2014 period, and Beauchemin considered it one of Crystal Castles' ten best songs up to that year.

== Track listing ==
Digital single / EP

1. "Celestica" (album mix) – 3:50
2. "Insectica" (2004 version) – 1:48
3. "Seed" (2004 version) – 1:42
4. "Mother Knows Best" (2004 version) – 2:01
5. "Celestica" (single mix) – 3:47

Radio edit CD

1. "Celestica" (radio edit) – 3:34
2. "Celestica" (instrumental) – 3:50

== Personnel ==
Adapted from the CD liner notes of Crystal Castles and the "Celestica" radio edit single.

- Ethan Kath – production, recording, engineering, writing; mixing (album version)
- Alice Glass – writing (vocals, lyrics)
- Paul Epworth – additional production, vocal recording
- Cenzo Townshend – mixing (radio edit)
- Nilesh Patel – mastering
