= GoodBooks =

Former English rock band

- GoodBooks live in 2006

Background information
- Origin: Kent, England
- Genre: Indie rock
- Years active: 2005–2009
- Labels: Transgressive, Columbia
- Members: Max Cooke; Chris Porter; JP Duncan; Leo von Bülow-Quirk
- Website: blog.ilovegoodbooks.com

GoodBooks were an English indie rock band from Sevenoaks in Kent. They first received media attention upon releasing their self-published EP Valves and Robots in June 2005.

The band signed to Transgressive Records in late 2005 for one single and released "Walk With Me" in April, before being signed by Columbia Records shortly after. GoodBooks disbanded after their last gig on 28 June 2009.

The name GoodBooks was suggested to Max Cooke at a gig by the children's TV presenter Holly Willoughby.

== History ==
GoodBooks' evolution began when Max Cooke and Leo von Bülow-Quirk started doing Beatles covers in their attic when they were 8. It took till 2001 for the band to take shape when at Sevenoaks School in Kent, Cooke and von Bülow-Quirk came together with Chris Porter and JP Duncan to form The Fingerprints. The Fingerprints set about their musical career by self-recording two albums; Cards on the Table, Clothes on the Floor and Miranda. Tracks such as "Tangerine" appeared on local radio stations such as BBC Radio Kent and KMFM. The band also started gigging locally in the South-East during this time, with regular gigs at the Tunbridge Wells Forum helping them to develop a modest regional fanbase, performing in front of 8,000 people on one eventful Christmas.

The Fingerprints disbanded in late 2004 when their bassist left. The band decided to continue as a four-piece and on the day of their first rehearsal "Walk With Me" was created. The band continued to write more songs but this time they had a maturer more electronic-influenced sound. The sessions created tracks for the Valves and Robots EP such as "Passchendaele" and "Isabella" which not only became fan favourites but impressed influential members of the industry and in late 2005 the band signed a deal for a one-off single with indie label Transgressive Records.

The following months saw GoodBooks establishing a place within the UK Alternative rock scene on a wider scale with gigs all over the country, notably supporting Art Brut and a gig with The Magic Numbers in Sweden. "Walk With Me" was rerecorded and was released as the band's debut single on Transgressive on 3 April 2006 on 7" vinyl and cassette only (one of only a very small number of cassette singles released that year). The video was shown on MTV2 and NME awarded it Runner-Up in its track of the week section, proclaiming GoodBooks "the best new band in Britain".

The band were approached by Columbia Records at the start of 2006 and signed a deal in May, releasing the singles "Turn it Back" and "Leni" in the second half of 2006 as well as making important and well-received performances at the Carling Reading and Leeds Festivals and the Truck Festival; their debut album, Control, was released on 30 July 2007 in the UK. The band maintained a Myspace page with updates on their progress. This page reported that their second album, with the working title 'Cry Of The Hunters', was completed and would be released in Summer 2009. NME claimed that this would occur on 4 May, although the album has yet to be released.

GoodBooks disbanded after Glastonbury 2009, where they played their last set on the John Peel Stage on 28 June 2009.

== Discography ==
=== Studio albums ===
- Control (2007)
- Control Freaks – The Remixes (2021)

=== EPs and singles ===
- Valves And Robots EP (2005)
- Walk With Me (2006)
- "You Can't Fool Me Dennis" (Mystery Jets Cover) (2006)
- "Turn It Back" (2006)
- Leni Mixes (2006)
- Leni (2006)
- "The Illness" (2007)
- The Illness Mixes (2007)
- "Passchendaele" (2007) No. 73 UK
- Passchendaele Mixes (2007)
- Lovesongs on Casio (2007)
