= All Hail (Kïll Cheerleadër album) =

Studio album by Kïll Cheerleadër
- Released: 2004 (Reissued in 2006)
- Recorded: January 2003 and July 2004
- Genre: Punk rock, heavy metal, hard rock
- Length: 38:03
- Label: Spinerazor/Corporate Punishment
- Producer: Kïll Cheerleadër, Jordon Zadoronzy

Kïll Cheerleadër chronology
| Gutter Days (2004) | All Hail (2004) |

All Hail is Kïll Cheerleadër's first full-length album, released in 2004, by Spinerazor/Corporate Punishment Records and later reissued in 2006. 6 out of the 12 songs on this album were featured on their previous releases as well.

== Track listing ==
1. "Sell Your Soul" (E.Deth, T.War) – 3:11 (Appeared on Gutter Days as "RNR")
2. "So Young" (E.Deth, T.War, C.MacKinnon) – 3:43 (Appeared on the Go demo as "Go")
3. "Deathboy" (E.Deth, T.War) – 2:39
4. "Lady of the Night" (E.Deth, T.War) – 3:39 (Appeared on Gutter Days as "Straight To Hell")
5. "No Feelings" (E.Deth, T.War, C.MacKinnon) – 3:30
6. "Go Away" (E.Deth, T.War) – 3:38
7. "Find Your Own Way Home" (E.Deth, T.War, C.MacKinnon) – 3:08
8. "Want Action" (E.Deth, T.War) – 3:14 (Appeared on the Go demo and Gutter Days)
9. "Don't Call Me Baby, Baby" (E.Deth, T.War, C.MacKinnon) – 3:55 (Appeared on Gutter Days)
10. "Bad Habit" (E.Deth, T.War) – 3:15 (Appeared on the Go demo)
11. "No Lullabies" (E.Deth, T.War) – 3:42
12. "Hurt the People You Love" (E.Deth, T.War) – 0:49

== Personnel ==
- Ethan Deth - Vocals, Bass
- Anthony Useless (T. War) - Vocals, Guitar
- Chad MacKinnon - Lead Guitar
- Kriss Rites - Drums
- All songs arranged by Kïll Cheerleadër
- Recorded and Produced by Jordon Zadoronsky and Kïll Cheerleadër
- Mixed by Terry Sawchuck, Kïll Cheerleadër, Jordon Zadoronsky (track 11) and No One (track 12)
- Mix Touch-Ups - Ted Onyszczak
- Mastered by Andy Krehm
- Exec. Produced by Spencer Cage
- Drums on track 3 by Jimmy Nova
- Cover Art by Ethan Deth and Penny Parker

== Critical reception ==
Evan Davies of Now gave the album a three out of five rating, calling it "a well-executed and upbeat hard rock album that succeeds at capturing the band’s energy and sweat without compromising quality", and noting similarities to Motörhead and Mötley Crüe.
