= Amnesty (I) =

2016 studio album by Crystal Castles

Studio album by Crystal Castles
- Released: August 19, 2016
- Recorded: 2015–2016
- Studio: Konk (London)
- Genre: Electropop
- Length: 33:14
- Labels: Fiction; Casablanca
- Producers: Ethan Kath; Samuel Jacob

Crystal Castles chronology
III (2012)	Amnesty (I) (2016)

Singles from Amnesty (I)
- 1. "Frail" Released: April 15, 2015; 2. "Their Kindness Is Charade (as Deicide)" Released: July 2, 2015; 3. "Concrete" Released: July 6, 2016; 4. "Char" Released: July 11, 2016; 5. "Fleece" Released: August 16, 2016; 6. "Sadist" Released: August 18, 2016

Professional ratings
Aggregate scores
Source	Rating
Metacritic	67/100
Review scores
Source	Rating
AllMusic	3.5/5 stars
Clash	7/10
Consequence of Sound	B−
Drowned in Sound	6/10
The Guardian	3/5 stars
Pitchfork	6.8/10
PopMatters	7/10 stars

Amnesty (I) (also titled Amnesty I and sometimes referred to as Amnesty) is the fourth and final studio album by Canadian electronic music duo Crystal Castles, released on August 19, 2016, by Fiction Records and Casablanca Records. It is their first album since the departure of previous frontwoman Alice Glass in 2014, and their only album to feature vocalist Edith Frances.

It is the band's only non-eponymous album. According to the band, their share of the proceeds from Amnesty (I) was donated to Amnesty International, the record's namesake.

== Release and promotion ==
On April 15, 2015, Ethan Kath shared a new track titled "Frail" on SoundCloud, writing 'this is Edith on vocals'. The track was released commercially to digital retailers a month later on May 11. Kath shared another track titled "Deicide" on July 2 on SoundCloud, later seeing a commercial digital release on July 10. "Deicide" was later revealed to be a demo for the album's outro track, "Their Kindness Is Charade". In late November 2015, Edith Frances played her first show as a member of Crystal Castles in South Africa.

On February 29, 2016, the band announced that they aimed to release the album sometime spring of that year, and revealed that the 2015 SoundCloud demos "Frail" and "Deicide" were slated for inclusion on the record.

In the last week of June 2016, the track "Concrete" was leaked on Korean website MNet. With the Concrete leak, fans discovered information about the album via Shazam, such as the title, track list, and cover art. Although the Shazam track list was not in order and the release date was unknown, Amazon Germany accidentally leaked the ordered track list and release date before the album was officially announced on July 11, 2016. The track Concrete was later released as a single on July 6 with an accompanying video on the same day on YouTube.

On June 29, the band previewed a new track "Femen" with a teaser of the music video showing birds caught and struggling in mist nets via Vimeo. On July 11, the band officially announced the new record, Amnesty (I) along with its cover art and track list while also premiering a new single, "Char", as Annie Mac's Hottest Record on BBC Radio 1. The single and pre-order for the album were made available a day later on July 12. The fourth pre-order single "Fleece" was made available on August 16 at the band's iTunes page. A CD rip of the album, including the bonus track "Kept", leaked online the same day. The band released "Sadist" on August 18, 2016, via their YouTube channel, followed by the official release of the album on August 19, 2016.

== Track listing ==
Amnesty (I) – digital edition track listing
No.	Title	Writer(s)	Producer(s)	Length
1.	"Femen"	Ethan Kath; Nirvana	Kath	2:32
2.	"Fleece"	Kath; Edith Frances	Kath	2:35
3.	"Char"	Kath	Kath	3:08
4.	"Enth"	Kath; Frances	Kath	3:29
5.	"Sadist"	Kath	Kath	2:30
6.	"Teach Her How to Hunt"	Kath	Kath	1:55
7.	"Chloroform"	Kath	Kath	3:08
8.	"Frail"	Kath	Kath	2:49
9.	"Concrete"	Kath; Frances	Kath	3:16
10.	"Ornament"	Kath	Kath; Samuel Jacob	4:07
11.	"Their Kindness Is Charade"	Kath	Kath	3:45
Total length:				33:18

Amnesty (I) – physical edition track listing
No.	Title	Writer(s)	Producer(s)	Length
11.	"Kept"	Kath; Beach House	Kath	4:03
12.	"Their Kindness Is Charade"	Kath	Kath; Lee	3:45
Total length:				37:21

Sample credits

- "Femen" samples Scala & Kolacny Brothers's cover of "Smells Like Teen Spirit" by Nirvana.
- "Kept" samples "Other People" and "New Year" by Beach House, from their 2012 album Bloom. "Kept" has been removed from digital versions of Amnesty (I); the song remains present on both the vinyl and CD versions of the album.

== Personnel ==
- Edith Frances – vocals
- Ethan Kath – production, mixing
- Lexxx – mixing (tracks 1–5, 7–10, 12)
- Patrick Mundy – mixing (track 8)
- Alex Zelenka – engineering (tracks 8, 9)
- Niko Stoessi – mixing (track 9)
- Etnik – mixing (tracks 9–12)
- Samuel Jacob – production (track 10); vocal engineering
- Kevin Durante – mixing (track 11)
- Pilo – mixing (track 11)
- Jake Lee – production (track 12)
- Mike Marsh – mastering
- Lisa Wiltse – cover photograph
- Ari D – band photograph

== Charts ==
Chart performance for Amnesty (I)
Chart (2016)	Peak position
Belgian Albums (Ultratop Flanders)	85
Belgian Albums (Ultratop Wallonia)	113
Swiss Albums (Schweizer Hitparade)	95
UK Albums (Official Charts)	86
US Top Dance Albums (Billboard)	2
