= Samuel Aranda =

Spanish photojournalist

Samuel Aranda (born 1979) is a Spanish photojournalist, best known for winning World Press Photo of the Year 2012.

== Early life ==
Aranda was born in Santa Coloma de Gramenet, Spain.

== Career ==
Aranda began to work as a photographer for newspapers El País and El Periódico de Catalunya at the age of 19. Two years later he traveled to the Middle East, where he covered the Israeli–Palestinian conflict for the Spanish news agency EFE.

In 2004 Aranda begun working for Agence France-Presse (AFP), covering stories in Europe, Asia, the Middle East and Africa. The photojournalist association ANIGP-TV awarded Arandas' photo series, about African immigrants trying to reach Europe, with the Spanish National Award of Photography. Since 2006 he has worked as a freelance photojournalist.

In 2011 Aranda covered the Arab Spring in Tunisia, Egypt, Libya and Yemen for The New York Times. In 2012 he was awarded the World Press Photo of the Year 2011. His winning picture shows a woman embracing her son, wounded during clashes against the rule of President Ali Abdullah Saleh in Sana'a, Yemen, part of the Arab Spring.

In 2014 he documented the Ebola outbreak in Guinea, Sierra Leona and Liberia for The New York Times.

In 2016 he received the Ortega y Gasset award for his photographs on the migration crisis in Greece.

During the next years he developed personal projects in Mali and Egypt, and received a grant from the BBVA foundation for a project to document the Nile.

He photographed the COVID pandemic in Spain for The New York Times.

Since 2023 he lives in Paris, and is a member of the British agency Panos.
