= Crystal Castles =

Canadian electronic music group (2005–2017)

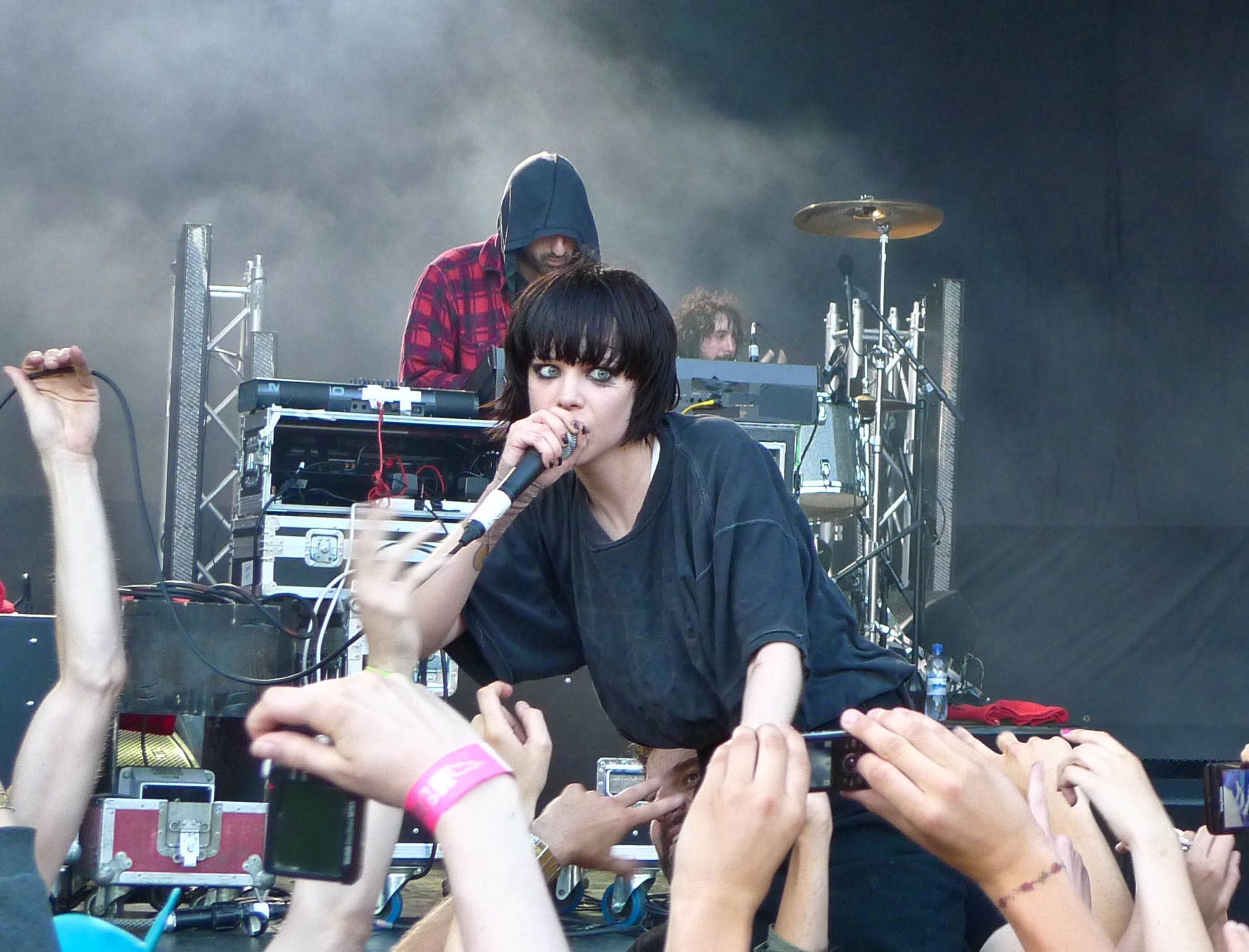
- Crystal Castles performing in Oslo in 2010

Background information
- Origin: Toronto, Ontario, Canada
- Genres: Electropunk; electroclash; synth-pop; witch house
- Years active: 2005–2017
- Labels: Lies; Last Gang; Fiction; Polydor
- Spinoff of: Kïll Cheerleadër
- Past members: Alice Glass; Ethan Kath; Edith Frances
- Website: crystalcastles.com

Crystal Castles were a Canadian electronic music group formed in 2005 in Toronto, Ontario, by songwriter-producer Ethan Kath and singer-songwriter Alice Glass. Crystal Castles was known for their chaotic live shows and lo-fi melancholic homemade productions. They released many limited vinyl singles between 2006 and 2007 before releasing four studio albums between 2008 and 2016.

Glass announced her departure from the band in October 2014, citing personal and professional reasons, and was soon replaced by Edith Frances. Three years later, during the band's 2017 tour, Glass accused Kath of sexual misconduct during her time in Crystal Castles, causing the remaining tour dates to be cancelled. Crystal Castles has since been inactive, having provided no updates on new material or performances since Glass's allegations.

== History ==
=== 2005–2007: Formation and Alice Practice ===
Ethan Kath (born Claudio Palmieri) met Alice Glass (born Margaret Osborn) in Toronto, Ontario, when she was in the 10th grade and he was 10 years her senior. Kath had already found some fame in Toronto's music scene, having made appearances on local television with his previous band, Kïll Cheerleadër. A couple of years later, Kath asked Glass to record vocals over tracks he had been working on since 2003. The sessions resulted in the track "Alice Practice", which was shelved for six months.

After being posted online, this track garnered attention and the duo decided to re-form for a formal release. The pair picked their stage names together, with the name "Crystal Castles" pulled from a line in the cartoon She-Ra: Princess of Power: "The fate of the world is safe in Crystal Castles." Musical influences included Kraftwerk, New Order, Orchestral Manoeuvres in the Dark, Pet Shop Boys and Yello.

Alice Practice became the band's first limited vinyl release in 2006. After miming the song on the British television series Skins, demand for the Alice Practice EP grew rapidly. Several limited-edition 7-inch vinyl singles followed in 2006 and 2007 on various independent labels, including two on London's Trouble Records. In February 2008, Kath said his aim was to "...make the most annoying sounds ever [for Alice to] scream over and then we'll try to open for Melt Banana".

=== 2008–2009: Crystal Castles ===
On March 18, 2008, Lies Records collected most of the vinyl singles and released them on CD and 12-inch vinyl for their debut eponymous album titled Crystal Castles, along with many previously unreleased tracks and three songs recorded for the collection. As Kath had declared, some of the tracks, including "XXZXCUZX ME", were deliberately designed to be grating. This eponymous debut album was included in NME's "Top 100 Greatest Albums of the Decade" list at number 39.

In mid-2008, Pitchfork and the Torontoist blog published stories about Crystal Castles' use of Trevor Brown's artwork without his permission. The image, depicting the singer Madonna with a black eye, was used as the band's logo. The issue was resolved after the band bought the rights to use the image from Brown.

In one of Kath's earliest unreleased demos, he incorporated a sample without permission; years later his record label discovered the track and uploaded it to the label's MySpace page without Kath's permission, and without credit to the original sampled song. The track, "Insectica" (CC vs Lo-Bat version), uses clips chopped out of a song by Lo-bat called "My Little Droid Needs a Hand", released under a Creative Commons license. Another track called "Love and Caring", samples the kick and snare from Covox's "Sunday".

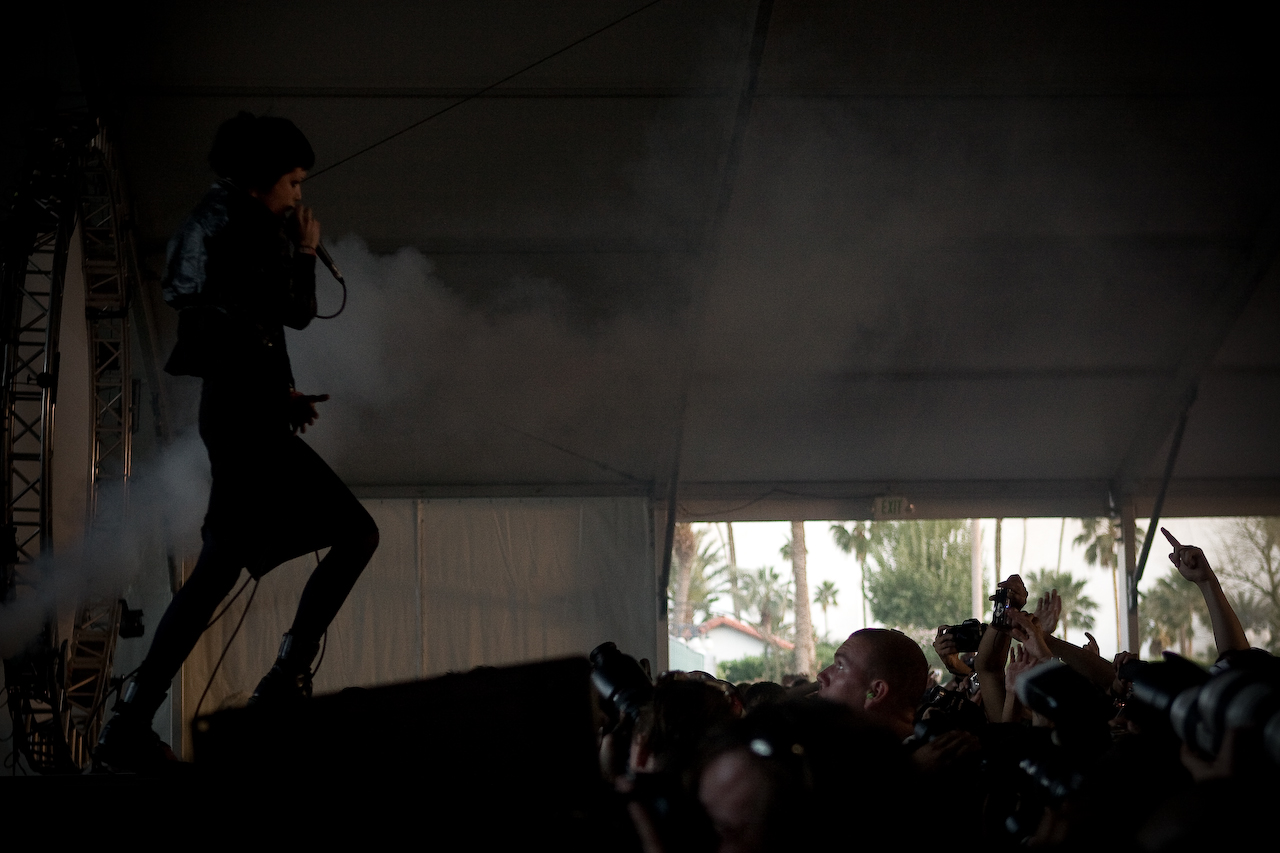
Crystal Castles performing at the Coachella Valley Music and Arts Festival 2009

Crystal Castles toured and performed at numerous festivals around the world to support the album, including Ireland's Oxegen Festival, the All Points West Music & Arts Festival in New Jersey, Coachella Valley and Music Festival in Indio, California, the Heineken Open'er Festival in Poland, and the Reading and Leeds Festivals in England. They headlined a Vice magazine tour across the UK in November 2007, and the 2008 NME New Noise tour across the UK.

Crystal Castles performed at the Glastonbury Festival in June 2008, where the on-stage antics of Glass, including climbing the rigging and stage-diving, led to the organizers curtailing their set. Crystal Castles played five dates with Nine Inch Nails in August 2008. The band also played Connect 2008 and the Iceland Airwaves festival. Over Halloween, they played a gig in LA that involved Alice Glass wrecking the drum kit.

They supported Blur on the first of two comeback shows in Hyde Park, London in July 2009. They also performed at the 2009 Bonnaroo Music & Arts Festival in Manchester, Tennessee. Back in Toronto, Crystal Castles performed at the Sound Academy as part of the Time Festival.

=== 2010–2011: Crystal Castles (II) ===
The band began recording their second album in a variety of locations including an abandoned church in Iceland, a self-built cabin in northern Ontario, a garage behind an abandoned drug store in Detroit, as well as Paul Epworth's London studio. Of the experience, Kath said, "I recorded most of the record in the coldest winter in decades in a church without heat in Iceland. It was so cold that when I listen back I can hear myself shivering. I chose it because it felt right". In December 2009, Kath gave vocalist Alice Glass a CD-R containing 70 instrumental tracks, for which she then recorded vocals on 35 tracks.

The group's second album, released variously as Crystal Castles, Crystal Castles (II), and simply (II), was released on May 24, 2010. With the release of their second album, their music became more aesthetic and more sharply focused, mixing synth pop and loud rock sounds with increasing skill. In April 2010, an early mix of the album leaked, prompting the label to release prior to the originally-planned date of June. The album was moderately successful charting in the UK at number 48, the US at number 188 and number 25 in Australia. The first two singles were "Celestica" and "Baptism". The third single, "Not in Love" featuring Robert Smith from the Cure, became the band's highest-charting single at that time.

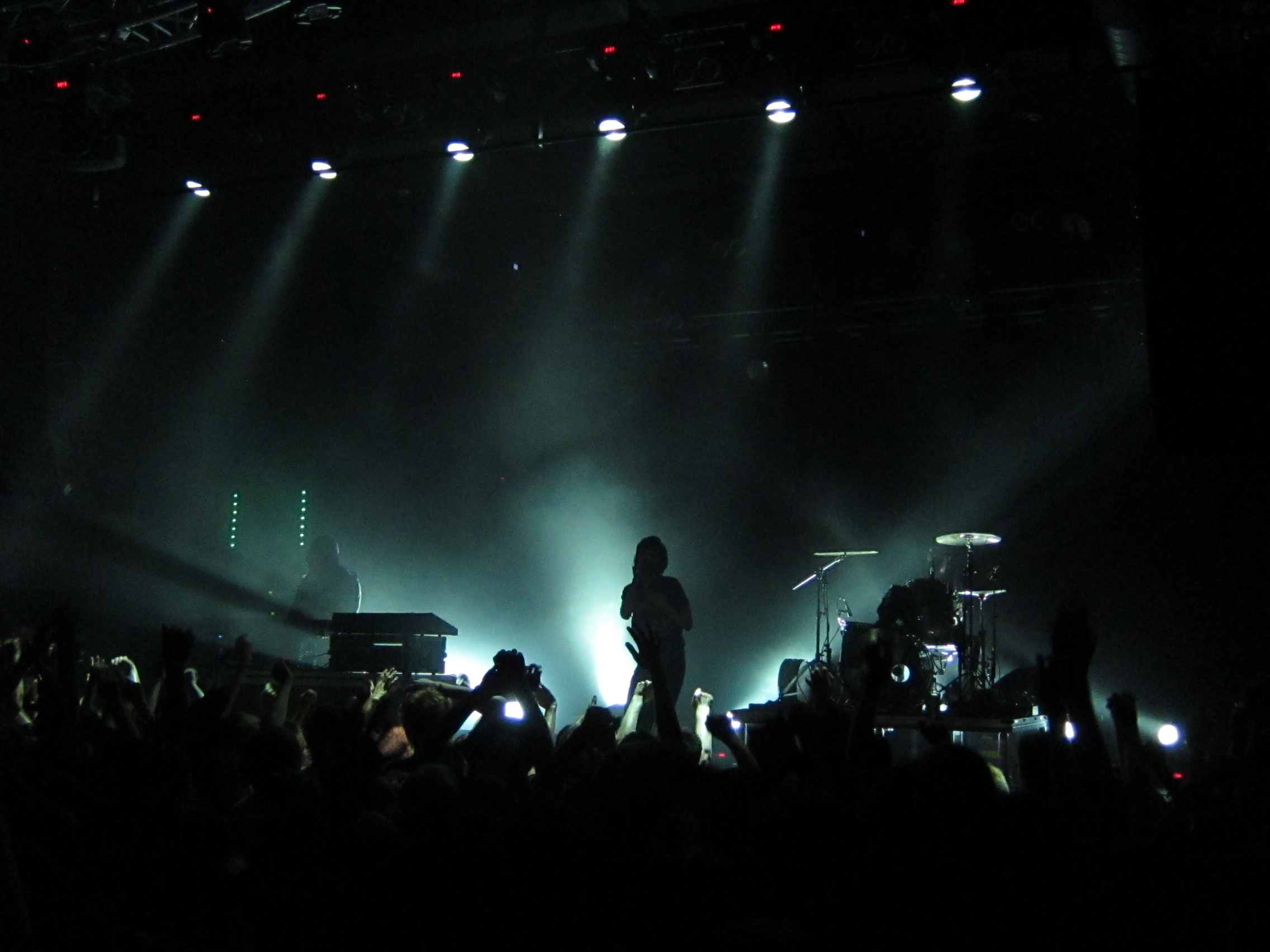
Crystal Castles in Helsinki, Finland, in June 2011

To support the album, the band played the Latitude Festival, Glastonbury 2010, RockNess 2010, the Pohoda Festival in Trenčín, Slovakia, the Exit Festival in Novi Sad, Serbia, the Emmabodafestivalen in Emmaboda, Sweden, BBC Radio 1's Big Weekend in Wales, and the 2010 Estrella Levante SOS 4.8 in Murcia, Spain. Crystal Castles did a Full-Length UK tour in November 2010, and headlined Hard Festival 2010.

In January 2011, Alice broke her ankle and had to perform some shows on crutches, but the band headlined the Shockwaves NME Awards Tour 2011 in the United Kingdom alongside Magnetic Man, Everything Everything and the Vaccines. They also performed the 2011 Ultra Music Festival in Miami, the Danish music festival NorthSide Festival in Aarhus, Australia's Big Day Out festival and Bestival, alongside the Cure whose vocalist, Robert Smith, contributed to Crystal Castles' new version of "Not in Love", the last night of Oxegen 2011 in Ireland, and Moogfest in Asheville, North Carolina.

Crystal Castles won the John Peel Award for Innovation at the Shockwaves NME Awards 2011, an award that recognizes an act who possesses a pioneering spirit and uncompromising approach to music. At the end of the summer, Rolling Stone named Crystal Castles icons of 20 Years of Lollapalooza.

=== 2012–2014: Crystal Castles (III) and Alice Glass's departure ===
In March 2012, Crystal Castles announced their relocation to Warsaw, Poland, to begin recording their third album. A fan's video of the band's June 9 performance at Parklife 2012 was uploaded to YouTube, boasting the first appearance of new song "Plague", which was released as the album's first single on July 25. On September 26, the band released second single "Wrath of God". The band performed on the Main Stage of Reading and Leeds Festival 2012. They also appeared at Electric Picnic 2012 in Ireland and The Parklife Weekender in Manchester. Crystal Castles toured North America in the fall of 2012 with old collaborators HEALTH.

The album (III) was released on November 7. During recording of their third album, Kath decided to forgo the use of computers, and ditched their old synthesizers and keyboards. They also recorded each track in one take. This gave their new recordings a significantly different sound, less practised and more original. "Sad Eyes" was the album's third single, released January 2013. "Affection" was released as the fourth single in April 2013. A planned fifth single, "Telepath", did not materialize.

More tour dates were announced in early 2013. This included a return to Australia to play the Big Day Out, and traveling to Colombia for the 2013 Estéreo Picnic Festival in Bogotá D.C. Following the North American leg of their headlining tour, the group performed as the opening act for Depeche Mode on The Delta Machine Tour, performing in Phoenix, Mountain View, Santa Barbara, San Diego, Dallas, and Houston.

In October 2014, via a Facebook post, Alice Glass announced that she was leaving Crystal Castles, that the band was finished, and that she intended to pursue a solo career. Crystal Castles' manager assured fans that the band would continue without her.

=== 2015–2016: Arrival of Edith Frances and Amnesty (I) ===
On April 16, 2015, Ethan Kath released a new Crystal Castles track, "Frail", featuring a new vocalist named Edith Frances. The song was accompanied with a caption by Kath, wishing Glass well but stating that she did not appear on the band's well-known songs. The caption was soon removed, but Glass responded by calling Kath's statement "manipulative" and said she helped shaped the band's aesthetic from the very beginning. On July 2, 2015, another new song, "Deicide", was released. Crystal Castles' first live performance with the new vocalist was on November 27 at Soundswild Festival in Johannesburg, South Africa.

The band played two sold-out shows at London's Electrowerkz on February 23–24, 2016, and soon followed this with a U.S. Festival Tour during Spring 2016. They were included in the announced lineup for the 79 Cents event at SXSW, a concert showcase organized by Tumblr to highlight women's income disparity. In an interview with The Verge, Glass stated her opinion that Kath was not a suitable person to be performing at a feminism-centric event. Shortly after, the band was removed from the lineup.

In July 2016 they released the single "Char" and announced the twelve-track album Amnesty (I) set for release on August 19 through Fiction Records. Also announced was a world tour starting in September 2016, including their first appearance in Hong Kong at the Clockenflap Festival on November 27, 2016.

=== 2017: Planned fifth album, allegations from Glass and cancelled tour dates ===
In 2017, Kath announced that he and Frances had recorded new demos for a followup album, Amnesty (II). Following the success of their world tour, a North American leg was also announced for 2017.

On October 24, 2017, Glass published a statement that detailed events of Kath subjecting her to sexual, physical and mental abuse during her time in Crystal Castles. She alleged that these patterns of abuse began when she started recording with Kath and continued to escalate until her eventual departure from Crystal Castles. Kath responded the same day in a statement issued to Pitchfork through his attorney, where he called the accusations "pure fiction" and said he was consulting with his lawyers as to his legal options. However the band cancelled the rest of their North American tour in light of Glass's accusations.

=== 2017–present: Inactivity and further sexual misconduct accusations ===
Crystal Castles has since been inactive, having not released any new material, performed any concerts, or even provided any updates on its own status since prematurely ending their tour. It was revealed after Glass' accusations that the band's longtime manager James Sandom no longer worked with the group. Kath sued Glass for defamation, but his suit was dismissed by the court. On December 21, 2017, Police Constable Allyson Douglas-Cook of the Toronto Police Service confirmed that Kath (real name Palmieri) was the subject of a Sex Crimes unit investigation.

In an interview with The Daily Beast, Glass and four other women came forward alleging that Kath had sexually preyed on them when they were teenagers and he was in his mid to late twenties. With Kath using his fame with Crystal Castles and Kïll Cheerleadër to get in contact with them at a young age, the alleged victims stated that he took advantage of their naivety and supplied them with drugs and alcohol in order to coerce them into sexual acts.

Glass later gave an interview with The Guardian and further elaborated on Kath's behavior towards her, commenting that he had thrown her phone out of a moving car, torn her hair out and lied about the nature of her rib injury. Kath had at several points gone against doctor's orders and made her perform when she was suffering from a concussion. Kath also held onto Glass' passport and controlled her finances, preventing her from having her own cell phone or credit card until a couple of years before she left. Glass also mentioned that if she ever thought of leaving Crystal Castles, Kath would threaten to replace her with someone "who's a better singer and who would put up with a lot worse than [she] would". After discovering that Kath had done similar actions towards other women, Glass felt it was her responsibility to come forward. Glass would disavow her work with Crystal Castles and asked fans to cease their support of the band.

== Musical style ==
Crystal Castles' musical style was described by reviewer Jack Shankly as "ferocious, asphyxiating sheets of warped two-dimensional Gameboy [sic] glitches and bruising drum bombast that pierces your skull with their sheer shrill force, burrowing deep into the brain like a fever." In a 2008 review for the BBC, Sophie Hammer wrote that to listen to Crystal Castles "is to be cast adrift in a vortex of deafening pain without a safety net. [... You get] the feeling you could do anything in the world, but that nothing would ultimately mean anything."

== Members ==
- Alice Glass – vocals, songwriter (2005–2014)
- Ethan Kath – instruments, songwriter, record producer, vocals (2005–2017)
- Edith Frances – vocals (2015–2017)

Touring members

- Christopher Chartrand – drums (2006–2017)
- Cameron Findlay – drums (2007–2008)
- Thomas Cullen – drums (2008)
- Mike Bell – drums (2008–2009)

== Discography ==
- Crystal Castles (2008)
- Crystal Castles (2010)
- III (2012)
- Amnesty (I) (2016)

== Tours ==
- Crystal Castles Tour (2007–2009)
- Crystal Castles II Tour (2010–2012)
- Crystal Castles III Tour (2012–2013)
- Amnesty (I) Tour (2016–2017)
