= Ethan Kath =

Canadian musician (born 1977)

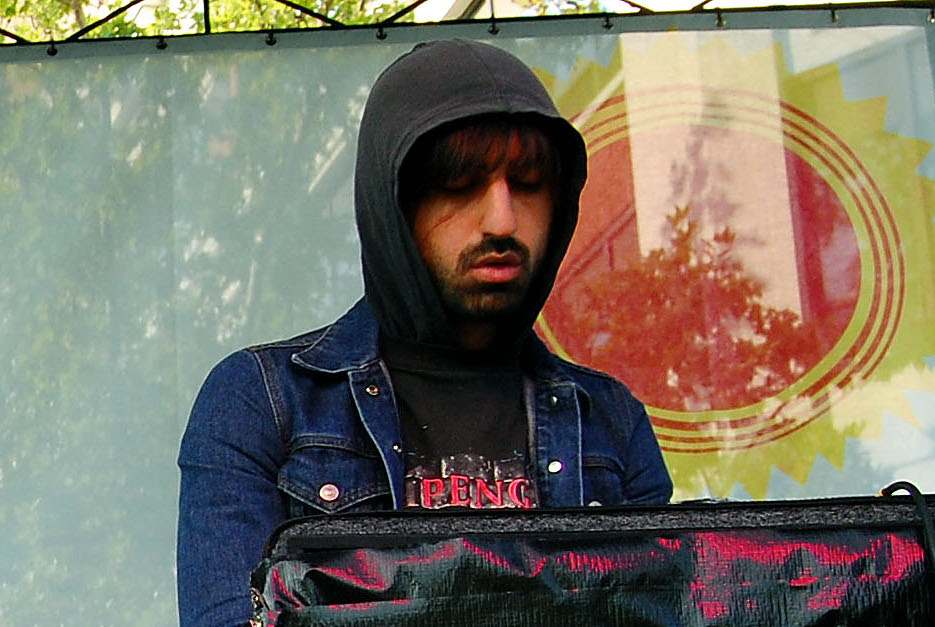
- Ethan Kath performing with Crystal Castles at Popped! Music Festival, 2011

Background information
- Also known as: Ethan Deth, Ethan Cawke
- Born: Claudio Paolo Palmieri; 25 December 1977 (age 48); Toronto, Ontario, Canada
- Genres: Electronic; noise; experimental; dream pop; indietronica; synth-pop; punk rock; heavy metal; electropunk; IDM; witch house
- Occupations: Musician; songwriter; record producer; multi-instrumentalist
- Instruments: Keyboards; synthesizers; sampler; guitar; bass guitar; drums; vocoder
- Years active: 1999–2017
- Labels: Lies; Last Gang; Fiction; Merok
- Formerly of: Crystal Castles; Kïll Cheerleadër; Die Mannequin; Jakarta

Claudio Paolo Palmieri (born December 25, 1977), known professionally as Ethan Kath, is a Canadian musician. He was the co-founder and songwriter/producer for Crystal Castles and bassist of Kïll Cheerleadër and Die Mannequin.

== Early life and career ==
Kath was born to Italian parents in Toronto, Ontario, on December 25, 1977. Prior to Crystal Castles, Kath played different instruments in many bands. At age 14, he played drums in Jakarta, an anarchist-hardcore band. Later, he was the bassist in a sleaze metal band called Kïll Cheerleadër under the pseudonym "Ethan Deth", originally "Ethan Cawke". He was also in a two-piece folk band.

Crystal Castles were known for the elusiveness of their off-stage lives and identities. Kath was routinely photographed wearing hoodies which obscured some or all of his face and has gone by many different aliases over the years.

Rolling Stone named Crystal Castles icons of 20 Years of Lollapalooza. Kath and his band Crystal Castles received the John Peel Award For Innovation at the 2011 NME Awards. Crystal Castles' debut album was included in NME's "Top 100 Greatest Albums of the Decade" list at #39.

== Sexual misconduct allegations ==
On October 24, 2017, Alice Glass posted a statement on her official website explaining her departure from Crystal Castles, accusing co-founder Ethan Kath of sexual, physical and mental abuse. The accusations detail the alleged abuse starting when Glass was 15 and began recording with Kath, and escalated until her eventual departure from Crystal Castles. Kath responded the same day in a statement issued to Pitchfork through his attorney, where he called the accusations "pure fiction" and said he was consulting with his lawyers as to his legal options. Kath subsequently sued Glass for defamation, which was dismissed in February 2018. Police Constable Allyson Douglas-Cook of the Toronto Police Service confirmed on December 21, 2017, that Palmieri was the subject of a Sex Crimes unit investigation.

In an interview with The Daily Beast, Glass and four other women came forward alleging that Kath had sexually preyed on them when they were teenagers and he was in his mid to late twenties. With Kath using his fame in Crystal Castles and Kill Cheerleader to get in contact with them at a young age, the alleged victims stated that he took advantage of their naivety and supplied them with drugs and alcohol in order to coerce them into sexual acts.

Glass later gave an interview with The Guardian and further elaborated on Kath's behavior towards her, commenting that he had thrown her phone out of a moving car, torn her hair out, lied about the nature of her rib injury, and had at several points gone against doctor's orders and made her perform after she received a concussion. Kath also held onto Glass's passport and controlled her finances, preventing her from having her own cell phone or credit card until a couple of years before she left. Glass also mentioned that if she ever thought of leaving Crystal Castles, Kath would threaten to replace her with someone "who's a better singer and who would put up with a lot worse than [she] would". After discovering that Kath had behaved similarly towards other women, Glass felt it was her responsibility to come forward.

== Discography ==
=== With Kïll Cheerleadër ===
- Gutter Days (2001)
- All Hail (2004)

=== With Die Mannequin ===
- How To Kill (2006)

=== With Crystal Castles ===
- Crystal Castles (2008)
- Crystal Castles (II) (2010)
- (III) (2012)
- Amnesty (I) (2016)
