= Raja Kumari =

American rapper (born 1986)

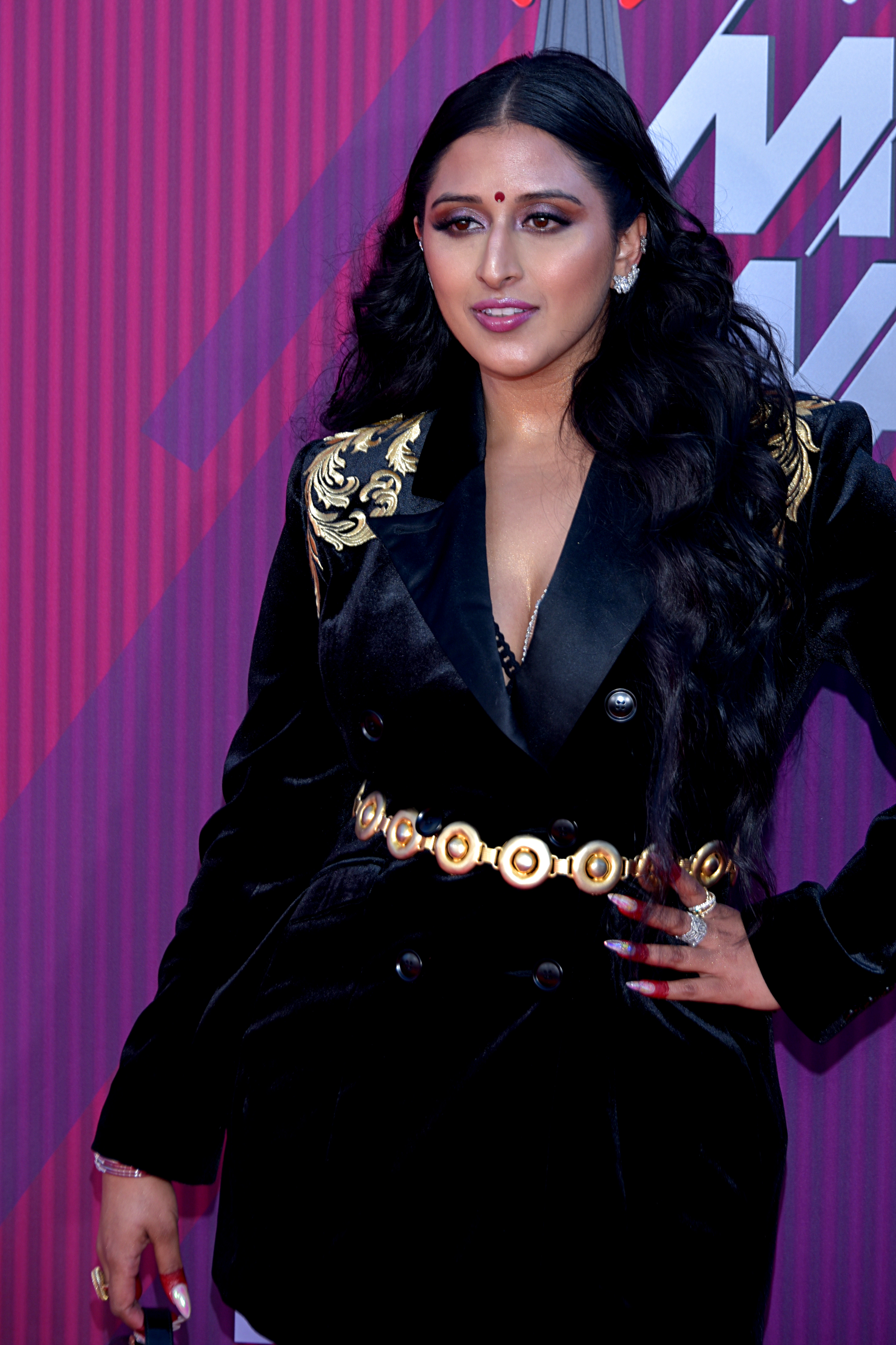
- Kumari at the 2019 iHeartRadio Music Awards in Los Angeles California

Background information
- Born: Svetha Yallapragada Rao; January 11, 1986 (age 40); Claremont, California, United States
- Genres: Hip hop; Pop
- Occupations: Rapper, singer, songwriter
- Instruments: Vocals, keyboards, guitar
- Years active: 2012–present
- Labels: Godmother Records; Previously: Epic Records, Mass Appeal Records
- Website: rajakumari.com

Svetha Yallapragada Rao (born January 11, 1986), professionally known as Raja Kumari, is an American rapper, songwriter and singer from Claremont, California. Kumari is best known for her collaborations with notable artists including Gwen Stefani, Iggy Azalea, Fifth Harmony, Sidhu Moosewala, Knife Party, and Fall Out Boy. She is also notable for receiving as a songwriter, the BMI Pop Awards in 2016, and featuring on BBC Asian Network programme Bobby Friction on July 5, 2016.

== Early life ==
Raja Kumari was born as Svetha Yallapragada Rao into a Telugu family in Claremont, California. Her family hails from Andhra Pradesh, India. Kumari holds a Bachelor of Arts degree in religious studies, with an emphasis on South Asian religions.

Her parents played an important role in developing her Indian character and trained her to become an Indian classical dancer who started performing at the age of 5. In an interview with Rolling Stone, Raja Kumari said that she found it tough and lonely as a South Indian girl growing up in Los Angeles.

While in fifth grade, Kumari discovered hip hop through the Fugees' album The Score. By the age of 14, she was a noticed freestyle MC known as "Indian Princess" (IP) or "Raja Kumari". She is a trained dancer in Kuchipudi, Kathak, and Bharatanatyam and had given many live performances in Ravindra Bharathi in Hyderabad.

During her artist career, she has contributed to several philanthropic activities through her performances including the creation of a hospital in Bangalore and a meditation hall in Hyderabad for the Vegesna Foundation, a school for children with physical disabilities. As a result, Kumari has been recognized as a benefactor by the Foundation for Indic Philosophy and Culture (Indic Foundation) and has been honored with the Kohinoor Award for excellence in the Classical Arts by the Governor of Tamil Nadu.

== Career ==
=== 2013-2016: Career beginnings as a songwriter and debut EP The Come Up ===
Kumari co-wrote, featured in or performed background vocals in a number of notable songs including Fall Out Boy's double-platinum single "Centuries", Iggy Azalea's "Change Your Life" feat. T.I., Vicetone's "Don't You Run", "Mirage" by Lindsey Stirling and "Set Me Free" for Baz Luhrmann's Netflix series The Get Down about the birth of hip-hop. She has also contributed as a songwriter to the songs "Like Mariah" by Fifth Harmony, "Eclipse" by Twin Shadow, and "Freefallin'" by Dirty South.

In March 2016, she worked as a songwriter on six songs from Gwen Stefani's third studio album This Is What the Truth Feels Like. In May 2016, Kumari was honored at the 2016 BMI Pop Awards for co-writing the song "Centuries". She released a mixtape on SoundCloud, titled Curry Sauce Vol. 1, in 2016. On July 1, 2016, she released her debut solo single "Mute" featuring Elvis Brown and produced by Jules Wolfson at Epic Records, which premiered on Paper Magazine's website. Her next single was "Believe in You", which released in October, accompanied by a music video. Both songs were later included in her debut EP, The Come Up, which released on November 17, 2016.

In addition, she had a recording contract with Epic Records that she signed in 2015, through L.A. Reid and collaborated with several players in the music industry, including artists Polow Da Don, J.R. Rotem, Timbaland, Rodney Jerkins, Soulshock and Karlin, Tricky Stewart and The-Dream, Justin Tranter and Fernando Garibay. She has also been inspired in her music style by the Indian composer and producer A. R. Rahman.

=== 2017-2020: BLOODLINE and further successes in India ===
In 2017, she made her debut in Hindi film soundtracks, with the song "Freaking Life" from the film Mom. In 2018, she co-wrote and released the songs, "Roots" and "City Slums" in collaboration with Indian rapper Divine. She starred in the Bollywood film Gully Boy as a judge, in a cameo appearance. In 2019, she finally made her debut in mother tongue Telugu by featuring in "Attention Everybody", a single produced by SouthBay (subsidiary of Ramanaidu Studios). The music was composed by Kone Kone and the Telugu lyrics were penned by Pranav Chaganty, which was a tribute to Telugu actor Venkatesh Daggubati released on his birthday.

Kumari was nominated for an MTV European Music Awards three times for Best India Act. She released her second EP Bloodline, in February 2019. She hosted the American Music Awards of 2019 Pre-Show telecast, alongside Lauren Jaregui. Kumari was also announced as the face of MAC Cosmetics' holiday campaign: #MACStarringYou, in which she appears in adverts and marketing materials around the globe. In September 2019, she collaborated with rapper Shah Rule on the track "Kaun Hai Tu". She was a judge on the first season of MTV Hustle, an Indian rap reality show. In 2021, she collaborated with rapper Sidhu Moose Wala on the song "US", from the latter's album, Moosetape.

=== 2022-present: Independent label ===
In 2022, she started her own independent label, Godmother Records. Her first release under the label was her third EP, HBIC, which featured guest appearances from Indian rappers KRSNA and Shah Rule. The EP's release was preceded by the lead single "MADE IN INDIA", a remix of the song "Made in India" by Alisha Chinai, which was accompanied by a music video, featuring veteran Indian actress Madhuri Dixit. She was nominated for the MTV Europe Music Award for Best India Act at the 2022 MTV Europe Music Awards.

In April 2023, Kumari released her debut studio album, The Bridge, featuring no guest appearances. In the same year in December, she worked with KSHMR on the track "All Fall Down", alongside Indian rappers Yashraj and Riar Saab, which was included on KSHMR's fourth studio album Karam. She also wrote and sung the title track from the soundtrack of the film Jawan. She released the single "Sherni Aayi" for the promotion of the web-series Aarya.

In 2024, she worked with Stefflon Don on the track "Renegade" for Arcane League of Legends: Season 2 and in 2025, won an American Music Award for the track, being the first person of Indian descent to ever do so.

In February 2025, she released her sophomore studio album, Kashi to Kailash, a devotional and spiritual project that blended traditional Sanskrit chants with modern hip-hop and electronica beats, under her independent label Godmother Records. In July 2025, KALKI Fashion collaborated with Kumari to launch a bold and inclusive ethnic wear collection. In the same year, she was featured on the song "Durga Trance" alongside Kanika Kapoor and Siroyi, from the album, Sounds of Kumbha, by Grammy-nominated producer Siddhant Bhatia. The album went on to be nominated at the 68th Annual Grammy Awards in the category for Best Global Music Album. In September 2025, she was featured on two songs from the soundtrack of the web-series The Ba***ds of Bollywood.

In 2026, she was signed to the talent management agency, Cornerstone Music. In the same year, she composed the soundtrack for the Telugu film Impure. She further released her debut Punjabi-language single, "Gyaara", a tribute to Sidhu Moose Wala, which was initially planned as a collaboration between the two, before the latter was assassinated in 2022. The song is the lead single from her upcoming sixth studio album, Zindabad: The Dekade of Kumari. She is now set to perform at the second edition of the hip-hop festival, Rolling Loud India.

== Discography ==
=== Film songs ===
Year	Song	Work	Composer	Co-Singer(s)	Writer(s)	Language	Notes
2017	"Jugni"	Kaatru Veliyidai	A. R. Rahman	Tejinder Singh; Shikara	Shellee	Tamil	
2017	"Freaking Life"	Mom	A. R. Rahman	Rianjali; Suzanne D'Mello	Irshad Kamil; Rianjali	Hindi	
2017	"Never Give Up"	Vivegam	Anirudh Ravichander		Raja Kumari	Tamil	
2018	"Allah Duhai Hai"	Race 3	JAM8	Amit Mishra; Jonita Gandhi; Sreeram	Shabbir Ahmed; Shloke Lal; Raja Kumari	Hindi	
2018	"Husn Parcham"	Zero	Ajay–Atul	Bhoomi Trivedi	Irshad Kamil	Hindi	
2019	"The Wakhra Song"	Judgementall Hai Kya	Tanishk Bagchi	Navv Inder & Lisa Mishra	Tanishk Bagchi, Raja Kumari	Hindi	
2020	"Afreeda"	Dil Bechara	A.R. Rahman	Sana Musa	Amitabh Bhattacharya	Hindi	
2021	"Phire Faqeera"	Pagglait	Arijit Singh	Amrita Singh, Arijit Singh	Neelesh Misra	Hindi	
2021	"Pagal"	Pagglait	Arijit Singh	Amrita Singh	Neelesh Misra	Hindi	
2023	"Jawan Title Track"	Jawan	Anirudh Ravichander		Raja Kumari	Hindi	Also Tamil and Telugu dubbed versions
2024	"Baby John - Beast Mode"	Baby John	Thaman S	Dhanunjay Seepana; Sai Charan; Saketh Kommajosyula; Saatvik G Rao; Ritesh G Rao; Sumanas Kasula	Raja Kumari; Adviteeya Vojjala; Ritesh G Rao	Hindi	
2025	"Dhop (Hindi)"	Game Changer	Thaman S	Thaman S; Prudhvi; Sruthi Ranjani Modumudi	Raqueeb Alam	Telugu	
2025	"Firestorm"	They Call Him OG	Thaman S	Thaman S • Deepak Blue • Silambarasan	Vishwa, Srinivasa Mouli, Raja Kumari (English), Adviteeya Vojjala (Japanese)	Telugu	
2025	"Firestorm"	They Call Him OG - (D)	Thaman S	Thaman S • Deepak Blue • Silambarasan • Nazeeruddin • Bharathraj R	Raqueeb Alam, Adviteeya Vojjala	Hindi	
2025	"Everybody Knows"	The Ba***ds of Bollywood	Ujwal Gupta	–	Dev Singh	Hindi	
2025	"Revolver"	The Ba***ds of Bollywood	Shashwat Sachdev	Vishal Dadlani, Piyush Kapoor and Shashwat Sachdev	Aryan Khan, Raja Kumari	Hindi	
2026	"Kismat Ki Chaabi"	Rahu Ketu	Abhinav Shekhar		Raja Kumari, Abhinav Shekhar	Hindi	
2026	"Woh Ikka Hai"	Ikka	Mithoon	Vishal Dadlani (Hindi)	Sayeed Qadri (Hindi), Raja Kumari (English)	Hindi, English	Netflix film

=== Albums, EPs and mixtapes ===
Year	EP / Mixtape	Track	Artist(s)
2016	Curry Sauce Vol. 1	New Level	Raja Kumari
2016	Curry Sauce Vol. 1	Memo	Raja Kumari
2016	Curry Sauce Vol. 1	MF Bawse	Raja Kumari
2018	The Come Up	Tribe	Raja Kumari
2018	The Come Up	Mute	Raja Kumari
2018	The Come Up	The Come Up	Raja Kumari
2018	The Come Up	Believe in You	Raja Kumari
2018	The Come Up	Meera	Raja Kumari
2018	The Come Up	The City	Raja Kumari
2019	Bloodline	SHOOK	Raja Kumari
2019	Bloodline	KARMA	Raja Kumari
2019	Bloodline	ROBIN HOOD	Raja Kumari
2019	Bloodline	STILL CARE	Raja Kumari
2019	Bloodline	BORN HUSTLA	Raja Kumari ft. Janine The Machine
2022	HBIC	MANIFEST	Raja Kumari
2022	HBIC	MADE IN INDIA	Raja Kumari
2022	HBIC	HBIC	Raja Kumari
2022	HBIC	ON	Raja Kumari ft. KR$NA
2022	HBIC	THE DON	Raja Kumari ft. Shah Rule
2023	The Bridge	BORN TO WIN	Raja Kumari
2023	The Bridge	NO NAZAR	Raja Kumari
2023	The Bridge	BABYLON	Raja Kumari
2023	The Bridge	JUICE	Raja Kumari
2023	The Bridge	COLORS	Raja Kumari
2023	The Bridge	LOVESICK	Raja Kumari
2023	The Bridge	LA INDIA	Raja Kumari
2023	The Bridge	GODS	Raja Kumari
2023	The Bridge	FEARLESS	Raja Kumari
2025	Kashi to Kailash	KASHI TO KAILASH	Raja Kumari
2025	Kashi to Kailash	THE DESTROYER (Shiv Tandav Strotam)	Raja Kumari
2025	Kashi to Kailash	I DARE THEM (Mrithunjay Mantra)	Raja Kumari
2025	Kashi to Kailash	I WORSHIP YOU (Lingashtakam)	Raja Kumari
2025	Kashi to Kailash	SHAMBO (808 Kirtan)	Raja Kumari

=== Singles and collaborations ===
Year	Track	Artist(s)	Note(s)
2016	Don't You Run	Vicetone ft. Raja Kumari	From the Aurora EP by Vicetone
2016	Mirage	Lindsey Stirling ft. Raja Kumari	From the album Brave Enough by Lindsey Stirling
2016	Medicine	Ferras ft. Raja Kumari	
2017	Drips Gold	Eden xo ft. Raja Kumari	
2017	City Slums	Raja Kumari ft. DIVINE	
2018	Vamos	Badal ft. Dr Zeus & Raja Kumari	From the Puro Puro EP by Badal
2018	I Did It	Raja Kumari	
2018	Roots	DIVINE ft. Raja Kumari	
2019	Kaun Hai Tu?	Shah Rule & Raja Kumari	
2019	Sab Theek Ae	Deep Jandu ft. Raja Kumari	From the album Down to Earth by Deep Jandu
2020	Bindis and Bangles	Raja Kumari	
2020	I Am A Rebel	Raja Kumari	Promotional track for boAt
2020	N.R.I.	Raja Kumari	
2020	Goddess	Krewella, NERVO ft. Raja Kumari	
2020	PEACE	Raja Kumari	
2020	One Love (in support of UNICEF)	The Amplified Project, Bob Marley & Skip Marley ft. Various Artists	Cover of Bob Marley's song "One Love", in support of UNICEF's COVID-19 response
2020	SHANTI (PEACE - Hindi Version)	Raja Kumari	
2021	Hello World	Rita Wilson, Claudia Leitte & Raja Kumari	
2021	US	Sidhu Moose Wala ft. Raja Kumari	From the album Moosetape by Sidhu Moose Wala
2021	Rani Cypher	Raja Kumari ft. Dee MC, SIRI & Meba Ofilia	
2021	Firestarter	Raja Kumari	
2021	Get It In	Raja Kumari	
2022	Cleopatra	THEMXXNLIGHT ft. Raja Kumari	From the album Skypearl by THEMXXNLIGHT
2022	Sahi Ja Nahi? (Good Or Not?)	F1rstman ft. Raja Kumari	From the album The Blend by F1rstman
2022	MADE IN INDIA	Raja Kumari	Lead single from her HBIC EP
2022	Out of Love	Raashi Sood & Raja Kumari	
2022	Life	King Sunny, Raja Kumari & Deep Jandu	
2023	RUN IT UP	Raja Kumari	
2023	Sherni Aayi	Raja Kumari	Promotional single for the web-series Aarya
2024	JUICE	Raja Kumari	Lead single from her debut album The Bridge
2024	In Love	Guru Randhawa, Raja Kumari, JSL Singh	
2024	Born Superstar	Raja Kumari	In collaboration with NEXA Music
2025	Bombay Acid	Indo Warehouse, Raja Kumari, Kunal Merchant	
2025	Thug Life	DJ Five Venoms, Raja Kumari, Harman Batra	

=== Songwriting credits ===
Year	Track	Artist(s)	Album / EP
2013	Change Your Life	Iggy Azalea	The New Classic
2014	Freefallin'	Dirty South	With You
2014	Boss Mode	Knife Party	Abandon Ship
2014	Centuries	Fall Out Boy	Non-album single
2015	Like Mariah	Fifth Harmony ft. Tyga	Reflection
2015	Sadness	Selah Sue	Reason
2015	Eclipse	Twin Shadow	Eclipse
2015	Spark	Ghost Town	Non-album single
2015	Runnin'	Yazz, Jamila Velazquez, Raquel Castro and Yani Marin	Empire: Original Soundtrack Season 2, Volume 1
2015	Broken Hearted	Kalin and Myles	Non-album single
2015	Changed My Life	Kalin and Myles	Kalin and Myles
2016	Red Flag	Gwen Stefani	This Is What the Truth Feels Like
2016	Naughty	Gwen Stefani	This Is What the Truth Feels Like
2016	Loveable	Gwen Stefani	This Is What the Truth Feels Like
2016	Obsessed	Gwen Stefani	This Is What the Truth Feels Like
2016	Splash	Gwen Stefani	This Is What the Truth Feels Like
2016	War Paint	Gwen Stefani	This Is What the Truth Feels Like
2016	Mirage	Lindsey Stirling	Brave Enough
2017	Never Give Up	Anirudh Ravichander	Vivegam
2019	Attention Everybody	Kone Kone and Pranav Chaganty	Non-album single

== Filmography ==
=== Television ===
Year	Title	Network	Role	Note(s)
2018	Lockdown	ZEE5	Recreating a Hindi Song	Web reality show
2019	MTV Hustle	MTV	Judge	
2022	The Kapil Sharma Show	Sony Entertainment Television	Guest	

=== Film ===
Year	Title	Role	Note(s)
2019	Gully Boy	Herself	Cameo
