= Todd (album) =

Studio album by Todd Rundgren
- Released: February 1974
- Recorded: July–August 1973
- Venues: Wollman Rink (New York); Griffith Park (Los Angeles)
- Studio: Secret Sound (New York)
- Length: 66:28
- Label: Bearsville
- Producer: Todd Rundgren

Todd Rundgren chronology
A Wizard, a True Star (1973)	Todd (1974)	Initiation (1975)

Singles from Todd
- 1. "A Dream Goes On Forever" Released: March 1974

Todd is the fifth studio album (and second double album) by the American musician Todd Rundgren, released in February 1974 by Bearsville Records. It is the follow-up to the previous year's A Wizard, a True Star and features a comparatively heavier reliance on guitar playing and synthesizers. About half of the tracks were performed by Rundgren alone, with the other half recorded with varying configurations of musicians. In the US, the album peaked at number 54, while lead single "A Dream Goes On Forever" reached number 69.

== Background ==
In March 1973, Rundgren's fourth album A Wizard, a True Star was released. Recorded at his newly built Secret Sound Studios in Manhattan, Wizard's sound and structure was heavily informed by his recent experiments in psychedelic drugs. Critical reception to Wizard was mixed, and according to Rundgren, the album was generally regarded as "professional suicide". In the weeks following the album's release, he produced the New York Dolls' self-titled debut album and Grand Funk Railroad's We're an American Band. Rundgren also prepared a technologically ambitious stage show with a new band, Utopia, his first official group since the Nazz. The tour began in April and was cancelled after only a couple weeks on the road due to its extensive technical demands.

Once Rundgren was finished with his production duties, he began formulating plans for an improved configuration of Utopia, but first returned to Secret Sound to record the songs that became Todd, which was more material drawing on his hallucinogenic experiences. This time, he had also formed a fascination with religion and spirituality, reading works by authors such as Helena Blavatsky, Rudolf Steiner, and Jiddu Krishnamurti that he had found at an occult book store in Lower Manhattan. He said he "started to have a great curiosity about where that psychedelic experience fits into not just my own personal history but the larger history of people's quest for meaning."

== Style and production ==
Compared to Wizard, Todd features synthesizers more heavily, although it still employs Rundgren's usual selection of guitar, piano, and found sounds. Its musical contents range from a Gilbert and Sullivan show tune, to fusions of Philadelphia soul and progressive rock. Due to the success of "Hello It's Me", Rundgren was primarily known for singer-songwriter ballads. In March 1974, he penned an article for Phonograph Record in which he compared Todd to his previous work: "Todd has the least number of ballads, I think, of all the albums I’ve done. It also has more guitar playing. It varies… I do what I feel inspired to do. If I don’t feel like playing that much rock ‘n roll, I don’t need another outlet — another band to play rock and roll." Further, he explained the concept of the record:

The whole record (Todd) is about states of consciousness. The Wizard album marked a beginning of new forms of communication — basing my musical ideas on responses other than just purely physical or material. In the Wizard album I was just discovering a different language. In the new album, it is more of a discourse in this new language — telling what I’ve discovered with this new attitude — that is, out of directing my attention to things other than material – to other states on consciousness. ... I did the Wizard album where the song ideas ranged from 15 seconds to 10 minutes. A further refinement of that idea is represented in Todd, and the refinement is that I’m breaking down all these barriers — removing the six spirals – just saying there are no limitations as to what is sung about or what the music sounds like, or how long it is… or whether it is even music at all.

Recording for the album lasted from July to August 1973. About half of the tracks were performed by Rundgren alone, with the other half recorded with varying configurations of musicians. It was envisioned as a single-disc album, but became a double album due to the unexpectedly large amount of material that was recorded. During the making of Todd, Rundgren took note of the "fusion jazz sensibility" between session musicians Kevin Ellman (drums) and John Siegler (bass). Rundgren chose them, along with Moogy Klingman and keyboardist Ralph Schuckett, to form the new configuration of Utopia. This line-up performed their first show at Central Park on August 25, 1973, sharing the bill with the Brecker Brothers and Hall & Oates. The purpose of this show was to record the track "Sons of 1984"; another show was carried out at Griffith Park in Los Angeles to accentuate the recording with overdubs. According to Rundgren: "We went in and taught the audience the lyrics and they sang it. I guess I was a little surprised that it really worked out. ... We were considering doing a whole record that way, as part of our touring show. Teach the audience a song, then record it, and you have a whole album’s worth of these songs from different cities."

Later, he commented of the album, "my psychedelic adventures were more a part of a spiritual quest to have a greater understanding about the nature of things. As a result, Todd is naturally more orderly, but it also dealt with alternative concepts such as empathy to the point of telepathy. So, on 'I Think You Know,' it's also saying, 'I think at the same moment that you know,' which is the formula for telepathy."

== Release ==
Originally scheduled for release in December 1973, Todd was delayed to the next February due to a vinyl shortage caused by the 1973 oil crisis. The sleeve included a computer-printed rendition of the cover photo in poster form, made up entirely of names of fans that had sent back the postcard included within the sleeve of A Wizard, a True Star. Utopia played more shows throughout November and December, performing material from Something/Anything? and Wizard after a solo opening set by Rundgren on piano playing along to a pre-recorded track. These shows resumed in March 1974, in support of Todd's release, and lasted until May. "A Dream Goes on Forever", a song originally written for Wizard but recorded for Todd, was issued as lead single.

== Reception ==
Professional ratings
Review scores
Source	Rating
Allmusic	4/5 stars
Christgau's Record Guide	C
Creem	C+

Robert Christgau of Creem reviewed: "I've been giving Todd the benefit of the doubt, so now he has to bear a burden of suspicion. On sides one and four ... the useful moments are buried in a mess of electronic studio junk, and even though they manage to pick themselves up from the rubble on sides two and three, that ratio is both uneconomical and unecological. This may well have honest ambitions, which are welcome, but it's too bad they're so self-deluded." Writing in the NME, Nick Kent said, "On first hearing, the album is the most annoying creation I've encountered in an age — all unrelated electroid scribbling, punctuated by a series of songs that sag next to seemingly similar work on Something/Anything and, to a lesser extent the Wizard album." Creem's Wayne Robbins similarly felt that the record was too esoteric for most listeners, concluding, "I think through all the noise and the occasional overplayfulness in place of composition, Todd has basically found his tongue. ... He's created a Grand Bouffe for the ears, which is as creatively rewarding to some as it is repulsive to others."

Reviewing the album for Zoo World, Jon Tiven wrote that "for those who claim that Todd's evolution since Something/Anything? has been one long and tedious descent, this critic suggests you give Todd many a listening before you pass judgement. It's an extremely complex and confounding album in terms of both structure and production, and although there may be an unnecessary surplus of wasted space, there's an awful lot of fine material to be found on it." Andrew Tyler, also from NME, felt that Todd was not as good as Wizard and explained, "In some ways Todd is as decisive and brainstorming as Wizard but it's fraught, almost evil ... as though Rundgren bummed out on the whole space celebration riff and wasn't sure what came next. Again we're out in the blue void, but this time you feel like your frozen with no way back."

Retrospectively, Stephen Thomas Erlewine wrote for AllMusic: "These are some major additions to his catalog, but the experiments and the excesses are too tedious to make Todd a necessary listen for anyone but the devoted. But for those listeners, the gems make the rough riding worthwhile." Nicholas Olivier, writing in The Rough Guide to Rock (2003), was less favorable: "One of the dullest double albums ever made, it covered a Gilbert And Sullivan song alongside a 3000-strong chorus for 'Sons of 1984', and suggested our hero was taking himself far too seriously."

XTC guitarist Dave Gregory became a lifelong Rundgren fan after hearing "The Last Ride" on BBC Radio. As he remembered: "I loved the maverick spirit of the guy. ... He was talented enough to stick a finger up to the industry and say 'This is my record – take it or leave it.'" Rundgren would later produce XTC's 1986 album Skylarking. "Izzat Love?" was prominently sampled in Neon Indian's "Deadbeat Summer", while both "The Spark of Life" and "A Dream Goes On Forever" were sampled in Charli XCX's "So Far Away". In 2000, Todd was voted number 1000 in the third edition of Colin Larkin's All Time Top 1000 Albums.

== Live performances ==
In 2010, Rundgren performed Todd and his 1981 album Healing live in full for the first time. A large video display and lasers were on display throughout the shows, with Rundgren and the band dressed in various psychedelic costumes.

== Track listing ==
All tracks are written by Todd Rundgren, except "Lord Chancellor's Nightmare Song" by Gilbert and Sullivan.

Side one
No.	Title	Length
1.	"How About a Little Fanfare?"	1:03
2.	"I Think You Know"	3:04
3.	"The Spark of Life"	6:23
4.	"An Elpee's Worth of Toons"	2:09
5.	"A Dream Goes On Forever"	2:21
6.	"Lord Chancellor's Nightmare Song"	3:32
Total length:		18:35

Side two
No.	Title	Length
7.	"Drunken Blue Rooster"	3:00
8.	"The Last Ride"	4:48
9.	"Everybody's Going to Heaven/King Kong Reggae"	6:38
Total length:		14:27

Side three
No.	Title	Length
10.	"No. 1 Lowest Common Denominator"	5:12
11.	"Useless Begging"	3:40
12.	"Sidewalk Cafe"	2:15
13.	"Izzat Love?"	1:55
14.	"Heavy Metal Kids"	4:16
Total length:		17:20

Side four
No.	Title	Length
15.	"In and Out the Chakras We Go (Formerly: Shaft Goes to Outer Space)"	5:47
16.	"Don't You Ever Learn?"	6:04
17.	"Sons of 1984"	4:34
Total length:		16:31

== Personnel ==
=== Musicians ===
- Todd Rundgren – vocals, guitars, synthesizers, acoustic piano, electric piano, organ (2, 5, 13), bass (2–3, 5, 7, 11, 13), drums (2, 5, 13), harpsichord (7), drum machine, percussion, arrangements
- Moogy Klingman – organ (6, 9–10, 14), grand piano (6, 8), harpsichord (6), electric piano (16–17)
- Ralph Schuckett – organ (8, 16–17), clavinet (9–10)
- Buffalo Bill Gelber – bass (8)
- John Siegler – bass (10, 17)
- John Miller – bass (9, 14, 16)
- Kevin Ellman – drums (9–10, 14, 16–17)
- Wells Kelly – drums (8)
- Peter Ponzol – soprano saxophone (8)
- Michael Brecker – saxophone (17)
- Randy Brecker – trumpet (17)
- Barry Rogers – trombone (17)
- First United Church of the Cosmic Smorgasbord, New York and San Francisco chapters – voices (17)

=== Technical ===
- Produced and engineered by Todd Rundgren
- Project coordination – Steve Hammonds
- Mastered by Andrew Pearce at Sterling Sound (New York, NY)
- Liner notes – Paul Lester
- Cover photography – Alen MacWeeney
- Photography – Joel Shapiro and Bill Klein, Jr.
- Design – Sarah Southin

== Charts ==
Todd

Chart (1974)	Peak position
Canadian RPM Top Albums	33
US Billboard Top LP's & Tape	54
US Cash Box Top 100 Albums	26
US Record World Album Chart	39

Singles

Year	Single	Chart	Position
1974	"A Dream Goes On Forever"	Canada RPM Top Singles	45
1974	"A Dream Goes On Forever"	US Billboard Hot 100	69
1974	"A Dream Goes On Forever"	US Cash Box Top 100	46
1974	"A Dream Goes On Forever"	US Record World Singles Chart	66
