= I Can't Wait =

I Can't Wait may refer to:

== Albums ==
- I Can't Wait (EP), by Yngwie Malmsteen, or the title song, 1994
- I Can't Wait, by Sanchez, 1991

== Songs ==
- "I Can't Wait" (Akon song), 2008
- "I Can't Wait" (Brooke McClymont song), 2002
- "I Can't Wait" (Nu Shooz song), 1985
- "I Can't Wait" (Stevie Nicks song), 1985
- "I Can't Wait", by Celldweller from Wish Upon a Blackstar, 2011
- "I Can't Wait", by Kanye West from Bully, 2026
- "I Can't Wait", by KeKe Wyatt from Soul Sista, 2001
- "I Can't Wait", by Kelly Osbourne from Sleeping in the Nothing, 2005
- "I Can't Wait", by Mudvayne from Mudvayne, 2009
- "I Can't Wait", by Ol' Dirty Bastard from Nigga Please, 1999
- "I Can't Wait", by Ric Ocasek from Beatitude, 1983
- "I Can't Wait", by Sleepy Brown and Outkast from the Barbershop 2: Back in Business soundtrack
- "I Can't Wait", by the Sundays from Static & Silence, 1997
- "I Can't Wait", by Twin Shadow from Forget, 2010
- "I Can't Wait", by the White Stripes from White Blood Cells, 2001

== See also ==
- "I Can't Wait Another Minute", a song by Hi-Five, 1991
- "Can't Wait", a song by Redman, 1995
- "Can't Wait", a song by Bob Dylan from Time Out of Mind, 1997
- "Can't Wait", a song by Doja Cat from Scarlet, 2023
- "Can't Wait", a song by Foreigner from Inside Information, 1987
