= Caer (disambiguation) =

Caer is a placename element in the Welsh language meaning "stronghold".

Caer can also refer to:

- Chester, a city known as Caer in Welsh
- Caër, a location in France
- Caer Ibormeith, a figure in Irish mythology
- Caer (album), a Twin Shadow album
