= Tim Nackashi =

American film director

Tim Nackashi is an American filmmaker, documentarian, and music video director. He is perhaps best known for his one-take music video for OK Go's "WTF?" and the documentary film Dirty Work, co-directed by David Sampliner and executive produced by Edward Norton, which had its premiere at the Sundance Film Festival.

== Career ==
Nackashi has created music videos for Maroon 5, Neon Indian and Death Cab for Cutie. He created a 360-degree video interactive film for the song "Are We" by musician Craig Wedren. In addition to music videos and commercial work, he continues to create socially aware documentaries such as the short film Through the Wall and the PSA Is History Repeating Itself? which was co-directed with Aya Tanimura and executive produced by Katy Perry.

== Films and documentaries ==
- Is History Repeating Itself?, PSA (2016)
- Through the Wall, short documentary (2015)
- Dirty Work (2004)

== Music videos ==
- "No Lie", Sean Paul and Dua Lipa, the music video also surpassed 1 billion views on YouTube in April 2022, making it Sean Paul's most popular music video.
- "Caffeinated Consciousness", TV on the Radio
- "Polish Girl", "Slum Lord Rising", Neon Indian
- "Girl Friend", Icona Pop
- "Flying Overseas", "Tribe", Theophilus London
- "Lying to You", Goldroom
- "Never Gonna Leave This Bed", Maroon 5
- "You Are a Tourist", Death Cab for Cutie
- "Shower", Becky G
- "100 Bad Days", AJR
- "Mind Over Matter", Young the Giant
- "Talk on Indolence", "Matrimony", "Die Die Die" by The Avett Brothers

== Commercials ==
- Heineken
- Ray-Ban
- HP

== Soundtracks ==
- The Paper
- Dirty Work (2004)

== Discography ==
Albums as Empire State

- Empire State (Warm Electronic Recordings, 2000)
- Eternal Combustion (Warm Electronic Recordings, 2001)

== Awards ==
- Imagen Awards, Though the Wall (2016)
- Webby Award, "WTF?", OK Go (2009)
- Grammy Award (nomination), Best Long Format Music Video, "Caffeinated Consciousness", TV on the Radio
- MTV Video Music Award (nomination), Best Art Direction, "You Are a Tourist", Death Cab for Cutie
- Atlanta Film Festival, Best Documentary, Dirty Work (2004)
- BendFilm Festival Jury Prize, Dirty Work (2004)
