= Era Extraña =

Studio album by Neon Indian
- Released: September 7, 2011
- Recorded: 2010 – 2011
- Studios: 45 Kalevankatu, Helsinki; Brooklyn, New York; Tarbox Road, Cassadaga, New York
- Genres: Chillwave; indietronica
- Length: 42:27
- Labels: Static Tongues; Mom + Pop
- Producer: Alan Palomo

Neon Indian chronology
The Flaming Lips with Neon Indian (2011)	Era Extraña (2011)	Errata Anex (2013)

Singles from Era Extraña
- 1. "Fallout" Released: July 27, 2011; 2. "Polish Girl" Released: August 3, 2011; 3. "Hex Girlfriend" Released: May 28, 2012

Era Extraña is the second studio album by American electronic music band Neon Indian. It was released on September 7, 2011, by Static Tongues and Mom + Pop Music. The recording took place between the winter of 2010 and 2011 during frontman Alan Palomo's visit to Finland. Containing influences and elements of psychedelic pop, shoegaze, and new wave, the album has the same summery sound as the band's debut studio album, Psychic Chasms (2009), but with a darker and more serious tone.

Era Extraña upon release received positive reviews from critics, a number of whom called it more focused, tight, and cohesive than Psychic Chasms, while some praising its songcraft. However, some mixed reviews noted that on this album, Neon Indian lost much of the charm that was apparent on Psychic Chasms. The album peaked at number 74 on the US Billboard 200, the band's first release to appear on the chart. The band toured North America from December 2011 to May 2012 to promote Era Extraña.

== Background and production ==
The album was recorded from the winter of 2010 to 2011 at Kalevankatu 45 in Helsinki, Finland, when Palomo lived there for four weeks. Palomo primarily wrote the album using a Voyetra-8, a Korg MS-20, and a modified Commodore 64, with the first weeks of production in Helsinki involving him learning this equipment. Palomo first saw the Voyetra-8 in the music video for New Order's "The Perfect Kiss" (1985), saying that he was amazed by its appearance: "It's this bizarre, kaleidoscope interface with these knobs, and it's really physical to use, a strange kind of challenge." Palomo's songwriting on Era Extraña was more influenced by his live performances than his previous projects, and he claimed that he had never expected to perform his songs live before. He said that "it was an influence; not so much something that limited me, but a feeling that lead to longer, more soundscape-driven songs. That was something that was undeniably in my mind: 'What would I want to be playing every night for eight months?' And the album evolved from there."

Unlike Neon Indian's debut studio album Psychic Chasms (2009), which involved creating "microloops" via building up one-bar samples into multiple bars that would make up a full song, Palomo said that in composing Era Extraña, he recorded a riff from a sound he made and tried to "keep that momentum up". For Era Extraña, in order to develop ideas he was having while recording the record, it was necessary for him to have more control of the effects and instruments he was using for the album. Making the album helped him learn how to create synth sounds and become a "gear geek", instead of relying on presets as he did with his previous works. He said that "the more tedious aspects of production do have the capacity to take the wind out of your sails, so you always have to navigate through that as quickly as you can before you start feeling burnt on the song, before you forget that initial spark that made you even want to write it in the first place".

The title plays with the different meanings of the word "extraña" in Spanish. Although it directly translates into "strange", it could also be interpreted as 'she was a stranger,' or 'strange era.' Or, could also mean to "command the act of longing".

== Composition ==
Era Extraña is significantly influenced by psychedelic pop, shoegaze, and new wave. Clash reviewer Nick Levine described the album as a loud indietronica record and "chillwave that's not actually that, well, chilled", joking that its genre should be marked as "drillwave". The instrumentation is cluttered with unsteady synth arrangements, as well as stray sounds of rocket-ship noises, phone conversations, laser sounds, and visceral samples of video games, but the music still manages to be tight. As Drowned in Sound reviewer Robert Cooke explained, the retro video game samples are used as "incidental noise, or miniature musical experiments", and Era Extraña also includes the "sparkling synths and wide-eyed wonder" of M83's more pop-sounding material that makes it sound like "a soundtrack for an Eighties teen movie about surfers from space" rather than just "Nintendo-sponsored masturbation". Spin reviewer Nick Murray also compared some of the songs to M83, while describing other tracks as "one Martin Rushent assist away from being genuine synth-pop hits".

Era Extraña has the same "lazy summer feel" as Psychic Chasms, but with a more serious and slightly darker tone. In a PopMatters review, Nathan Wisnicki said that Palomo's introversion is "certainly apparent", citing that even the album's most joyful melodies are "rigidly grafted to both rhythmic thrust and hooks more anxious than comfortable". Pitchfork's Larry Fitzmaurice said that the album is much more serious than Psychic Chasms, but "Palomo isn't always as assured in rendering the darker material". He also noted that while Era Extraña is not exactly a breakup album, it does sound "romantic and lovesick" and uses sounds that emulate these feelings. At the same time, the album also feels "expansive and lonely, like someone staring at the night sky in solitude". Era Extraña also contains the same unsteady synth riffs, filtered drums, and vocal hooks as Psychic Chasms, with the addition of crunchy, fuzzy guitars; thick analog synths; and a lot of reverb, as well as much clearer production.

== Songs ==
Era Extraña is connected by three brief, wispy instrumental interludes: "Heart: Attack", "Heart: Decay", and "Heart: Release". "Attack" opens the album "like a 200-foot-tall Game Boy loading up", according to Cooke. It starts with the sound of 8-bit particles coming to a "celestial boil" in the first few seconds, followed up by "what the birth of the universe must have sounded like had the Big Bang occurred inside the original Nintendo Entertainment System", according to Paste critic Wyndham Wyeth. "Decay" starts the "it-has-to-get-worse-before-it-gets-better" phase of the post-breakup period that is explored on Era Extraña, while "Release" ends the album with relief, yet also a fearful first step forward from a breakup. Heather Phares of AllMusic said that out of all of its songs, these three tracks, along with "Future Sick", sound the most similar to Psychic Chasms.

Fitzmaurice found "Polish Girl" to be similar to the song "Reunion" (2004) by Canadian band Stars, seeing a resemblance to its theme of someone trying to recover, and yearning for, young love. Palomo asks questions in the song that are likely to be unanswered, such as "Do I still cross your mind?/ Your face still distorts the time". Cooke noted the "dazzling syncopated pulse" to be similar to the coin sound effect in games from the Mario series, while observing melodies that "splash and slide around sickly-sweet flurries of arpeggios and a family-friendly feel-good beat". Parry Ernsberger of Blurt said that the song includes what sounds like samples from the game Super Mario World (1991), and has the "euphoric energy" of Cut Copy's album Zonoscope (2011). Beats Per Minute writer Aurora Mitchell said the song "sounds like 80s disco distorted through an old computer", while Phares noted the song sounds more like Palomo's other project Vega than Neon Indian. "The Blindside Kiss" includes elements of alternative rock, grunge, and garage rock. Club Fonograma writer Blanca Méndez said that "The Blindside Kiss" is about the "staying-at-home-and-staring-at-ceilings early stage" of a breakup, which is "the one in which you allow yourself to wallow in the pain because you deserve at least that much". Méndez noted the song's "tinny layers of sound" and Palomo's "breathy, almost frustrated vocals". The electro-shoegaze song "Hex Girlfriend" addresses an ex-girlfriend, and includes video game synth timbres similar to those on Psychic Chasms opener "(AM)". Both "The Blindside Kiss" and "Hex Girlfriend" are filled with "buzzsaw"-toned guitars, which BBC Music's John Aizlewood compared to the Jesus and Mary Chain.

Likened to Orchestral Manoeuvres in the Dark and Depeche Mode, the "cavernous Anglophile disco" song "Fallout" is about trying to forget a failed relationship, with Palomo asking the subject to "please let me fall out of love with you". Palomo sounds unreachable on this song, like "a lonely planet boy sending out distress signals from the saddest corner of the solar system", said Rolling Stone critic Jon Dolan. Wisnicki said there is "a haunting vagueness" to the slow pace, with the song's "subtle synth-disguised-as-choir tactics used to help the song break unexpectedly from slow Joy Division-esque pummel to a bridge that reaches into bliss...if only for a few seconds". DIY's Dani Beck and Derek Robertson said that the track sounds like music for the opening credits of a late-night Arnold Schwarzenegger B-movie, while Phares stated it could have been recorded by Love and Rockets or Billy Idol back in the 1980s. Both "Fallout" and "Halogen" contain dramatic keyboard riffs inspired by the music of Duran Duran. The title track represents a first post-breakup sign of hope. Dramatic, clattering drums are present on the track, and musicOMH reviewer Ben Hogwood compared its heavy, firm beat to Ultravox's "Vienna" (1981). Aizlewood noted that the song resembles "Out of Touch" (1984) by Hall & Oates.

The three following songs, "Halogen (I Could Be a Shadow)", "Future Sick", and "Suns Irrupt", follow three different types of forgetting a breakup. Reminiscent of music released in the New Romanticism period, "Halogen (I Could Be a Shadow)" was described by Méndez as "a spectacularly enveloping piece," with its somber instrumentation of "steady, comforting percussion, delicate, inviting synths, and vintage girl group-evoking background vocals" resulting in "a gorgeous vessel for ecstatic release". Fitzmaurice described "Halogen (I Could Be a Shadow)" as the "near-double" of "Kim and Jessie" by M83, whereas Aizlewood compared the song to the works of the Thompson Twins, while Phares said it sounds like music that would "play over the credits of a sci-fi teen sex comedy". With its "seasick synths" as well as "bits of arena rock guitar and girlish harmonies", the heavy, playfully sad "Future Sick" manages to convey "the feeling of growing older in a world that's growing faster than you are". It depicts Palomo lamenting "mid-volume under his own creation's drunken abstraction" about wanting to go back into the past, because thinking of the future is making him ill. At this point, according to The Observer's Killian Fox, some of the wooziness that Era Extraña takes from Psychic Chasms "veers into nausea". Mitchell described the instrumentation of "Suns Irrupt" as "hypnotic and firework fizzling synths with a woozy synth background". Palomo repeatedly whisper-growls the line "Suns irrupt / I wake up I wake up", and Fitzmaurice compared its repetitiveness to "Someone Great" (2007) by LCD Soundsystem.

== Release and promotion ==
Three singles were released from Era Extraña: "Fallout", on July 27, 2011; "Polish Girl", on August 3, 2011; and "Hex Girlfriend", on May 28, 2012. The album was first released in Japan on September 7, 2011. The limited edition package came with the Pal198X, a mini analog synthesizer created by Palomo and the company Bleep Labs. With three oscillators, including two triangle waves and a square low-frequency oscillator, it is a modified version of the company's synth kit Pico Paso, with the addition of swappable controls. Era Extraña was the first Neon Indian album to appear on the US Billboard 200, reaching position 74. It also charted on the same magazine's Independent Albums, Top Alternative Albums, Dance/Electronic Albums and Top Rock Albums. Outside the US, the album also charted on the Japanese Albums Oricon chart. A 42-date North American tour for Era Extraña was announced on December 6, 2011. It premiered on December 31 at the Lights All Night festival in Dallas, Texas, and ended with a show at New York City's Terminal 5 on May 12, 2012.

== Reception ==
Professional ratings
Aggregate scores
Source	Rating
AnyDecentMusic?	7.2/10
Metacritic	76/100
Review scores
Source	Rating
AllMusic	4/5 stars
The A.V. Club	B−
Clash	8/10
NME	8/10
The Observer	4/5 stars
Pitchfork	7.9/10
PopMatters	5/10
Rolling Stone	3.5/5 stars
Spin	7/10
Tiny Mix Tapes	3.5/5 stars

Era Extraña was met with generally positive reviews from music critics. At Metacritic, which assigns a normalized rating out of 100 to reviews from mainstream publications, the album received an average score of 76, based on 27 reviews. Based on their assessment of the critical consensus, it was given 7.2 out of 10 on AnyDecentMusic?.

Some reviewers praised Era Extraña for being more focused, tight, and cohesive than Psychic Chasms. Phares said that while it does not have the same homespun charm as Psychic Chasms, the album proved that the project could be more than just a chillwave group. Fitzmaurice called it "a commitment to tighter, wide-reaching songcraft and appeal", also praising the "kitchen-sink arrangements" for still sounding "taut and defined". Wyeth said that Palomo made a fluid album with Era Extraña, something intended but not properly achieved on the project's last studio album.

Hogwood called the album a "fascinating listen, borne of a man who clearly has an extremely active imagination". He praised the hooks, the witty and thoughtful lyrics, and the unpredictable harmonic structures, also noting that the album turns the building blocks of the tracks from the last album "into very appealing little morsels", aiding listeners with short attention spans. In Consequence of Sound's 4-star review, Mohammad Choudhery wrote that, while Psychic Chasms was "a shy and fragmented collection of songs", a product of the bedroom production era, Era Extraña is "a confident, all-inclusive album" that the public wouldn't be able to "fence into a single, silly-titled subgenre". NME critic Anne T. Donahue labeled the album as "a lesson in how to execute electronic music properly". In Mitchell's 79%-rated review, he called Era Extraña "electronic [music] in its purest form". He said that the flow of the album is not as smooth as Psychic Chasms, but that Palomo's influences are "in all the right places and it seems that [he] is wearing them proudly on his sleeve".

Aizlewood found Era Extraña to be an intriguing yet unusual record, but disliked the lack of "obvious emotion", calling the album overall "easy to admire but hard to love". Tiny Mix Tapes's Guy Frowny called it "an agreeable listening experience with moments of catchiness and beauty throughout, and hints of an evolutionary path that leave future expectations open-ended". Dolan saw the album as an improvement on Psychic Chasms and said it dunks "dreamy early-MTV haircutband balladry in layers of psychedelic schmutz, almost hiding excellent songs in the murk". Olly Parker, a reviewer for Loud and Quiet, also noted an improvement and praised the album's songcraft and interesting sound, but said it fell in the "meh" category and "can't get below the surface". Cooke opined that "it has a lot to offer around the edges, but is difficult to truly connect with at its core", reasoning that the album is not the best example of cutting-edge modern-day pop music, nor does it contribute anything new to electronic music.

Some reviews were more mixed. The A.V. Club critic Steven Hyden wrote that while Era Extraña sounds "fuller" than Psychic Chasms and "still has plenty of hooks to offer", Palomo "has to take both feet out of the bedroom to move his music forward". He also compared it to another chillwave album that was released a few months before, Washed Out's Within and Without, saying, "Where Within is an immaculately conceived graduation from [Ernest] Greene's early lo-fi work, Extraña is a minor refinement that still feels chintzy in places." Beck and Robertson also discussed Washed Out, as well as Toro y Moi, dubbing the album an unfunny parody of chillwave and also criticizing it as "such a strong homage to everything that's cool about retro-chic that you can't help but smell a rat". At PopMatters, Wisnicki wrote that Era Extraña does not have the same quality tunes and aesthetic as Psychic Chasms, declaring that while each song on Psychic Chasms "felt like getting to open another piece of candy", Era Extraña "feels more like opening one of those refrigerated boxed sandwiches from the grocery store".

On year-end lists, Era Extraña came in at number 50 on Under the Radar's list of their top 80 albums of 2011, and number 16 on Stereogum's list.

== Track listing ==
All tracks are written by Alan Palomo, except The Blindside Kiss; co-written by Joshua McWhirter.

Standard edition
No.	Title	Length
1.	"Heart: Attack"	0:59
2.	"Polish Girl"	4:26
3.	"The Blindside Kiss"	3:35
4.	"Hex Girlfriend"	3:18
5.	"Heart: Decay"	1:46
6.	"Fallout"	3:34
7.	"Era Extraña"	2:59
8.	"Halogen (I Could Be a Shadow)"	4:37
9.	"Future Sick"	4:49
10.	"Suns Irrupt"	5:30
11.	"Heart: Release"	2:07
12.	"Arcade Blues"	4:47
Total length:		42:27

Japanese edition
No.	Title	Length
13.	"Eras Ending Above Us"	4:48
14.	"(AM)"	0:25
15.	"Deadbeat Summer"	4:03
16.	"Laughing Gas"	1:43
17.	"Terminally Chill"	3:34
18.	"(If I Knew, I'd Tell You)"	0:48
19.	"6669 (I Don't Know If You Know)"	3:21
20.	"Should Have Taken Acid with You"	2:21
21.	"Mind, Drips"	3:09
22.	"Psychic Chasms"	4:06
23.	"Local Joke"	3:27
24.	"Ephemeral Artery"	2:52
25.	"7000 (Reprise)"	0:57

== Personnel ==
Credits adapted from the liner notes of Era Extraña.

- Alan Palomo – production, arrangements, performer
- Dave Fridmann – additional production, mixing
- Claudius Mittendorfer – mixing (tracks 1, 2, 7, 8)
- Joshua McWhirter – guitars (tracks 3, 5–7, 10)
- Adam Corbesmeyer – bass (track 4)
- Jason Faries – percussion (track 6)
- Jezy Gray – guitar (track 6)
- Aaron Brown – album art
- Ben Chappell – album art
- Rob Carmichael – layout, design

== Charts ==
Chart performance for Era Extraña
Chart (2011)	Peak position
Japanese Albums (Oricon)	193
US Billboard 200	74
US Independent Albums (Billboard)	16
US Top Alternative Albums (Billboard)	12
US Top Dance Albums (Billboard)	4
US Top Rock Albums (Billboard)	21

== Release history ==
Release dates and formats for Era Extraña
Region	Date	Format(s)	Label(s)	Ref.
Japan	September 7, 2011	CD	Yoshimoto R and C	
Australia	September 9, 2011	CD; digital download	Popfrenzy	
Germany	September 12, 2011	Digital download	Transgressive	
United Kingdom	September 12, 2011	Digital download	Transgressive	
United States	September 13, 2011	CD; LP; digital download	Static Tongues; Mom + Pop	
United Kingdom	October 3, 2011	CD	Transgressive	
Germany	October 7, 2011	CD; LP + CD	[PIAS] Cooperative; Transgressive	
