= Errata Anex =

EP by Neon Indian
- Released: April 9, 2013
- Recorded: 2010–2013
- Length: 28:07
- Label: Static Tongues; Mom + Pop
- Producer: Alan Palomo

Neon Indian chronology
Era Extraña (2011)	Errata Anex (2013)	Vega Intl. Night School (2015)

Professional ratings
Review scores
Source	Rating
AllMusic	3.5/5 stars
Virgin Group	6.5/10

Errata Anex is the second extended play (EP) by American electronic music band Neon Indian. It was released digitally on April 9, 2013, by Mom + Pop Music. The EP consists of remixes of tracks from the band's second studio album, Era Extraña (2011). The EP's title is an anagram of Era Extraña. The band's frontman, Alan Palomo, said of the EP:

These remixes are a small collection found along the way of my year on the road while we were touring Era Extraña. The artists were chosen by whatever most consistently blared out of my headphones that fall and what I was most giddy to hear an amalgamation of from the songs I was playing live, and the artists I'd listen to later that night. If imitation is the highest form of flattery, then total re-imagination from song scraps must be something far more warm, mutant, and mutual. I hope you enjoy them.

== Track listing ==
No.	Title	Length
1.	"Polish Girl" (Optimo Mix)	7:51
2.	"Halogen" (Boyd Rice Remix)	4:35
3.	"Heart Release" (Patten Remix)	6:07
4.	"Blindside Kiss" (Actress Remix)	6:21
5.	"Hex Girlfriend" (Twin Shadow)	3:13

== Release history ==
Region	Date	Format	Label	Ref.
United States	April 9, 2013	Digital download	Static Tongues; Mom + Pop	
United Kingdom	April 28, 2013	Digital download	Transgressive	
France	April 29, 2013	Digital download	Universal	
