= Vega Intl. Night School =

Studio album by Neon Indian
- Released: October 16, 2015
- Studio: The Palomo Dojo; Plantain, New York City; Maze, Atlanta; Rad, New York City; Midnight Sun, New York City; Carnival Fantasy
- Genre: Vaporwave; synth-pop; chillwave
- Length: 51:21
- Label: Mom + Pop
- Producer: Alan Palomo

Neon Indian chronology
Errata Anex (2013)	Vega Intl. Night School (2015)	World of Hassle (as Alan Palomo) (2023)

Singles from Vega Intl. Night School
- 1. "Annie" Released: May 26, 2015; 2. "Slumlord" Released: August 13, 2015; 3. "The Glitzy Hive" Released: October 8, 2015

Vega Intl. Night School is the third album by American electronic music band Neon Indian. It was released on October 16, 2015, by Mom + Pop Music. The album title was an intentional nod to Alan Palomo's other music project, titled Vega, for which he produced only a single EP. Noticing that ideas from Neon Indian and Vega were merging, Palomo decided to combine the two projects into one and retire the use of the Vega moniker.

== Critical reception ==
Professional ratings
Aggregate scores
Source	Rating
AnyDecentMusic?	7.7/10
Metacritic	79/100
Review scores
Source	Rating
AllMusic	4.5/5 stars
The A.V. Club	A−
Consequence of Sound	B
Drowned in Sound	9/10
Exclaim!	7/10
Pitchfork	8.6/10
Q	4/5 stars
Rolling Stone	3.5/5 stars
Spin	7/10
Uncut	6/10

Vega Intl. Night School received generally positive reviews from music critics. At Metacritic, which assigns a normalized rating out of 100 to reviews from mainstream publications, the album received an average score of 79, based on 17 reviews. Praising "the most rewarding of danceable peaks" in the album's middle section, Calum Slingerland of Exclaim! wrote, "Palomo's four-year absence has yielded a flashy, fun record with welcome diversity".

After noting that "there's plenty of Tom Tom Club and Blondie in the album's bubbly disco", Heather Phares of AllMusic said, "In its own way, VEGA INTL. Night School is just as immersive as Neon Indian's previous work and even more impressionistic, with a flamboyance that makes it a captivating standout within his own work as well as his contemporaries".

Rolling Stone reviewer Renato Pagnani said, "Palomo peels back the layers of psychedelia that have sometimes obscured his work in the past, striving for a directness that results in the most crystallized – and accessible – version of his aesthetic yet".

Sasha Geffen of Consequence of Sound praised "the sequence of 'Slumlord' into 'Slumlord's Re-lease' and 'Techno Clique'", declaring that it "proves to be Night School's centerpiece and the most concrete realization yet of Neon Indian as pure electronic music".

=== Year-end lists ===
Publication	Accolade	Year	Rank	Ref.
The 405	The 30 Best Albums of 2015	2015	10	
Complex	The Best Albums of 2015	2015	44	
Gorilla vs. Bear	Best Albums of 2015	2015	35	
The Line of Best Fit	The 50 Best Albums of 2015	2015	—	
No Ripcord	Top 50 Albums of 2015	2015	49	
Pitchfork	The 50 Best Albums of 2015	2015	35	
Pretty Much Amazing	The 50 Best Albums of 2015	2015	15	
Under the Radar	Top 100 Albums of 2015	2015	20	
Variance	The 50 Best Albums of 2015	2015	17	

== Track listing ==
All tracks are written by Alan Palomo, except where noted.

No.	Title	Writer(s)	Length
1.	"Hit Parade"		1:05
2.	"Annie"	Alan Palomo; Jorge Palomo	4:03
3.	"Street Level"		4:02
4.	"Smut!"		3:27
5.	"Bozo"		1:23
6.	"The Glitzy Hive"		3:51
7.	"Dear Skorpio Magazine"	A. Palomo; J. Palomo	3:56
8.	"Slumlord"	A. Palomo; J. Palomo	5:15
9.	"Slumlord's Re-lease"		2:25
10.	"Techno Clique"		4:32
11.	"Baby's Eyes"		6:26
12.	"C'est la vie (Say the Casualties!)"		3:03
13.	"61 Cygni Ave"	A. Palomo; J. Palomo	4:04
14.	"News from the Sun (Live Bootleg)"	A. Palomo; J. Palomo	3:53
Total length:			51:21

Japanese edition bonus track
No.	Title	Length
15.	"Smiley Sticker"	2:51

== Personnel ==
Credits adapted from the liner notes of Vega Intl. Night School.

=== Musicians ===
- Alan Palomo – all vocals; Fender Rhodes electric piano (track 7)
- Jorge Palomo – bass (tracks 2, 7, 8, 13, 14); guitar (tracks 2, 6, 7, 13, 14)
- Alex Epton – drum programming (tracks 2, 3, 6, 7, 10, 14); percussion (track 11)
- Ben Allen – guitar (track 3); drum programming (tracks 3, 9, 13)
- Morgan Wiley – outro Minimoog keyboard (track 4); Rhodes Chroma keyboard (track 7); Korg PS-3100 keyboard intro (track 8); piano (track 11)
- Nicole Brenny, Gryphon Graham, Eliza Walton, Austin Brown, John Jacobson, Kai Flanders, Lanneau White – partygoes in background (track 6)
- Chris Coombs – guitar (tracks 7, 11, 12)
- W. Andrew Raposo – Fender Rhodes electric piano (track 7)
- Nick Millhiser – drums (track 8)
- Mark Cobb – percussion (track 9)
- Abe Seiferth – additional guitar (track 11)
- Jason Faries – drums (track 11)
- Josh Ascalon – outro noise textures (track 12)
- Brandi Ullian – back-up vocals (track 14)

=== Technical ===
- Alan Palomo – production (all tracks); engineering (tracks 1–8, 10–14)
- Alex Epton – mixing (tracks 1–10, 12, 14); additional production (track 4); engineering (tracks 6, 8, 10)
- Sumner Jones – engineering (tracks 2, 3, 6, 8, 13); outro mixing (track 6)
- Ben Allen – additional production (tracks 2, 3, 6, 8, 9, 13); mixing (tracks 9, 13)
- Josh Ascalon – engineering (tracks 6, 7, 11, 12)
- W. Andrew Raposo – engineering (tracks 7, 8, 11, 13)
- Eric Broucek – engineering (tracks 8, 14)
- Jordan Richardson – engineering (track 11)
- Heba Kadry – mastering at Timeless Mastering, Brooklyn, New York

=== Artwork ===
- Robert Beatty – artwork, design, art direction
- Luke Lanter – cover photo
- Alan Palomo – art direction

== Charts ==
Chart (2015)	Peak position
US Billboard 200	100
US Independent Albums (Billboard)	13
US Top Alternative Albums (Billboard)	12
US Top Rock Albums (Billboard)	14
