= World of Hassle =

Studio album by Alan Palomo
- Released: September 15, 2023
- Genres: Experimental pop, jazz-funk
- Length: 48:26
- Languages: English; Spanish; French
- Label: Mom + Pop
- Producer: Alan Palomo

Alan Palomo chronology
Vega Intl. Night School (as Neon Indian) (2015)	World of Hassle (2023)

Singles from World of Hassle
- 1. "Nudista Mundial '89" Released: May 1, 2023; 2. "Stay-at-Home DJ" Released: June 6, 2023; 3. "Meutrière" Released: July 11, 2023; 4. "Club People" and "La Madrileña" Released: August 8, 2023

World of Hassle is a solo album by Alan Palomo, better known for his work under the alias Neon Indian. The album, Palomo's first release under his birth name, was released on September 15, 2023, by Mom + Pop Music.

Robert Beatty acted as the album's art director. The album includes contributions from Palomo's brother Jorge Manuel, Flore Benguigui, and Mac DeMarco. Palomo sang in English, Spanish, and French on the album. It was preceded by four singles.

The album was inspired by 1980s-era Leonard Cohen and various rock frontmen of the time who had left their bands for solo careers. The music consists of experimental pop and jazz-funk, and was inspired primarily by city pop and the music of Bobby Caldwell. It was received positively by critics.

== Background ==
Palomo started releasing music as Neon Indian in 2009 at age 21, his third musical alias after launching the projects Ghosthustler and Vega. On July 27, 2023, a few days after his 35th birthday, Palomo explained his reasoning for releasing World of Hassle under his real name, saying he was inspired by I'm Your Man-era Leonard Cohen and multiple 1980s rock frontmen who had left their bands and reinvented themselves as solo acts. He called the idea "impish" and "refreshing", and said that despite the loss of name recognition, he couldn't resist the idea and figured that "50 year old me might thank me for it in the long run". He also emphasized that the Neon Indian name wasn't being "officially retired".

In an interview for Tone Glow, Palomo elaborated on Cohen's influence, saying:

And one big thing that was on my mind was that for some reason I'd missed–I mean I'd listened to Leonard Cohen in college but I'd never heard his later '80s stuff–I just ran across I'm Your Man. That whole album and just him in the black suit, total Jewish zaddy vibes, grown-ass man. And he's discovered his sense of humor or at least finally showcasing it. Everyone's like "dude since when are you funny?" and he's like "I've always been funny, I just never put it in my music." That was so liberating. The lyrics are so smart but they're also so ham-and-cheese and really lean into the self-parody aspect of it.

If I was to do the '80s sophisti-pop, male frontman rock cliché, "I'm quitting my band and making a jazz record!"–if I was to do it, I also had to make fun of it. So that was kinda where that came from, but also with Neon Indian, you hear the production, they're very textural records–I kept asking myself, "Well they know you can do that, what have they not heard you do yet?" And I realized it was really putting your vocals in the front and center, not hiding behind any reverb or distortion. I know the real fans will go on Genius, they'll buy the record, they'll look at the lyrics. But a lot of the time, nobody really understands what I'm saying on those records. This one it's like "dude let's just throw it on the forefront", especially in the era of lyric videos. Don't hide behind it, if that's gonna be you up front, what do you have to say? And the answer nine times out of ten is jokes, that's just how I communicate with my friends. So that was just something where, if it was going to be more of an Alan Palomo record, and be more personal in that regard, the humor had to be there by design. And the Leonard Cohen realization allowed me to do that.

The album is Palomo's first work of his own under his birth name, though he previously used the name when featuring on the Miami Horror song "Holidays" from their 2010 album Illumination. The album name came from a quote from the Thomas Pynchon novel Inherent Vice.

== Release ==
Prior to the album's announcement, Palomo released its lead single, "Nudista Mundial '89", on May 1. The song features indie rock singer-songwriter Mac DeMarco, who was brought on board because he had a Yamaha CP-70 which Palomo wanted for the song. The single came with a music video inspired by the video game series Leisure Suit Larry.

The album was announced on June 6, set for release on September 15, 2023, by Mom + Pop Music. Along with the announcement came its second single, "Stay-at-Home DJ", which Palomo cowrote with his brother in 2019 and previously performed on tour as Neon Indian. The single came with a music video directed by Robert Beatty, who is also the album's art director. The third single, "Meutrière" featuring L'Impératrice singer Flore Benguigui, was released on July 11, 2023. "Club People" and "La Madrileña" were released together on August 8.

== Style and influences ==
The album has been called experimental pop and jazz-funk. It is also said to include disco, R&B, yacht rock, city pop, synthwave, reggae, Italo disco, and funk. The album is built on a core instrumental lineup of guitar, bass, synthesizer, and saxophone. Lyrics on the album are written in English, Spanish, and French; the Spanish lyrics were inspired by contemporary Mexican novelists including Fernanda Melchor and Yuri Herrera.

Palomo's inspiration for the record came from listening to Bobby Caldwell and city pop records, namely Awakening by Hiroshi Sato, and decided he wanted to incorporate their fusion of Steely Dan-esque jazz fusion with disco. He also described the sound he was striving for as "Thomas Dolby-type Fairlight PPG-style production" recreated with a Yamaha TG33. During the making of the album, Palomo mainly read the Thomas McGuane novels Panama and 92 in the Shade and the Jay McInerney novels Bright Lights, Big City and Brightness Falls, and also watched the film adaptation of Bright Lights, Big City starring Michael J. Fox.

== Reception ==
Professional ratings
Review scores
Source	Rating
Clash	7/10
Paste	8.5/10
Pitchfork	7.6/10
Under the Radar	7.5/10 stars

Glide Magazine's Ryan Dillon called the album "an endlessly fun LP that takes you on a cosmic journey through Palomo's limitless artistry." Paste's Sam Rosenberg wrote that the album "does, sometimes, feel a touch pastiche-y", but "Palomo's sun-soaked, salt-rimmed, neon-tinged world has such an immersive, hypnotic pull that its more derivative tendencies don't really matter." Everything Is Noise's David Rodriguez called the album "without a single doubt one of the best I'll hear this year."

Joshua Minsoo Kim of Pitchfork called the tracks "the funniest and most musically accomplished songs of his career", as well as Palomo's "most fun record because it's his most accomplished". Clash's Nick Roseblade called the album "pretty fun" with "some killer melodies", but was disappointed by the lack of diversity between songs which are "of a similar tempo, tone, and theme." Under the Radar's Andy Steiner called the album "leisurely and confident" and "as easy as a beach day."

Paste ranked the album as one of the 30 best pop albums of 2023.

== Track listing ==
All tracks are written by Alan Palomo with others noted below. All tracks produced by Palomo.

World of Hassle track listing
No.	Title	Writer(s)	Length
1.	"The Wailing Mall"	Ian Wilson Cronin	5:08
2.	"Meutrière" (featuring Flore Benguigui)	Flore Marie Sidonie Benguigui; Cronin; Lou-Rebecca di Domenico	3:34
3.	"La Madrileña"		3:50
4.	"Nudista Mundial '89" (featuring Mac DeMarco)	DeMarco	3:04
5.	"The Return of Mickey Milan"		4:06
6.	"Stay-at-Home DJ"	Jorge Manuel Palomo	3:47
7.	"Club People"	J.M. Palomo; Joachim Polack	4:23
8.	"Alibi for Petra"		2:01
9.	"Nobody's Woman"	J.M. Palomo; Max S. Townsley	4:18
10.	"Is There Nightlife After Death?"	J.M. Palomo; Townsley	3:14
11.	"Big Night of Heartache"	J.M. Palomo; Townsley	4:09
12.	"The Island Years"		4:43
13.	"Trouble in Mind"		2:09
Total length:			48:26

== Personnel ==
- Alan Palomo – vocals, synthesizers, drum programming
- Mac DeMarco – vocals, vocal engineering (4, 7)
- Claudius Mittendorfer – mixing engineer (1–5, 7–12)
- Jorge Manuel Palomo – mixing engineer (6, 13)
- Heba Kadry – mastering engineer
- Robert Beatty – art director
