= Polish Girl =

Single by Neon Indian

from the album Era Extraña
- Released: August 3, 2011
- Recorded: Winter 2010–2011
- Studio: Kalevankatu 45, Helsinki
- Genre: Electropop, dance pop
- Length: 4:26
- Label: Static Tongues, Mom + Pop
- Songwriter: Alan Palomo
- Producer: Alan Palomo

Neon Indian singles chronology
"Fallout" (2011)	"Polish Girl" (2011)	"Hex Girlfriend" (2012)

"Polish Girl" is a song recorded by the American band Neon Indian. It was released on August 3, 2011, as the second single from their second studio album, Era Extraña (2011). A music video, directed by Tim Nackashi and produced in collaboration with The Creators Project, was released on September 13. It was included in the PC, PlayStation 4 and Xbox One rereleases of Grand Theft Auto V in 2014 and 2015 as part of the radio station Radio Mirror Park.

== Composition ==
Era Extraña was recorded from the winter of 2010 to 2011 at Kalevankatu 45 in Helsinki, Finland, when Palomo lived there for four weeks. "Polish Girl" was defined as electropop and dance pop, and was compared to the work of OMD and New Order.

Larry Fitzmaurice of Pitchfork found "Polish Girl" to be similar to the song "Reunion" (2004) by Canadian band Stars, seeing a resemblance to its theme of someone trying to recover, and yearning for, young love. Palomo asks questions in the song that are likely to be unanswered, such as "Do I still cross your mind?/ Your face still distorts the time". Drowned in Sound reviewer Robert Cooke noted the "dazzling syncopated pulse" to be similar to the coin sound effect in games from the Mario series, while observing melodies that "splash and slide around sickly-sweet flurries of arpeggios and a family-friendly feel-good beat". Parry Ernsberger of Blurt said that the song includes what sounds like samples from the game Super Mario World (1991), and has the "euphoric energy" of Cut Copy's album Zonoscope (2011). Beats Per Minute writer Aurora Mitchell said the song "sounds like 80s disco distorted through an old computer", while Heather Phares of AllMusic noted the song sounds more like Palomo's other project Vega than Neon Indian.

== Reception ==
Pitchfork gave "Polish Girl" their "Best New Track" accolade at the time of its release. They named it the 69th best song of 2011, while Consequence named it the year's 18th best, with Frank Mojica writing: "With 'Polish Girl', Neon Indian has traded their signature chillwave stylings in favor of a dreamy spin on dance pop and set the new standard for retro chic".

== Personnel ==
Credits adapted from the liner notes of Era Extraña.

- Alan Palomo – production, arrangements, performer
- Dave Fridmann – additional production, mixing
- Claudius Mittendorfer – mixing

== Charts ==
Chart performance for "Polish Girl"
Chart (2011)	Peak position
Mexico Ingles Airplay (Billboard)	39
