= Old Love / New Love =

Single by Twin Shadow featuring D'Angelo Lacy

from the album The Music of Grand Theft Auto V and Eclipse
- Released: September 13, 2013
- Genre: Dance-pop; house
- Length: 3:49
- Label: Rockstar Games; Warner Bros.
- Songwriters: George Lewis Jr.; Dennis Herring; D'Angelo Lacy
- Producers: Twin Shadow; Herring

Twin Shadow singles chronology
"The One" (2012)	"Old Love / New Love" (2013)	"To the Top" (2014)

Remix cover
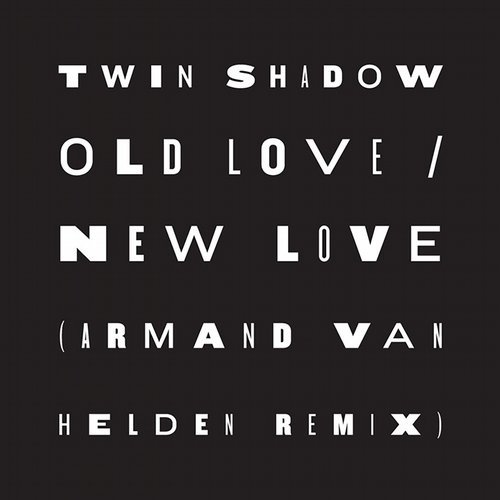
- "Old Love / New Love [Armand Van Helden Remix]"

"Old Love / New Love" is a song by American singer-songwriter Twin Shadow featuring D'Angelo Lacy. It was written for the 2013 video game Grand Theft Auto V, broadcast on the fictional radio station Radio Mirror Park, which Shadow hosted. To promote the video game, the song was released as a single on September 13, 2013, and Rockstar Games included it on their soundtrack album The Music of Grand Theft Auto V, on the Vol. 1: Original Music side.

Musically, "Old Love / New Love" is a dance and house song with R&B and Hi-NRG influences. Its lyrics explore the confusion of a protagonist who receives a phone call from an ex-girlfriend he still loves despite his sorrow. "Old Love / New Love" also appeared on Shadow's third studio album, Eclipse, released by Warner Bros. in 2015. Critics praised the track for its distinctive composition and dance-floor appeal, marking a departure from the artist's earlier work. That year, Shadow promoted the song through live performances, and it was remixed by American DJ Armand Van Helden.

== Background ==
Rockstar Games published the action-adventure game videogame Grand Theft Auto V (GTA V) on September 17, 2013. Its original soundtrack contained 214 songs, including the track "Old Love / New Love", which was written specifically for the video game by George "Twin Shadow" Lewis Jr., D'Angelo Lacy and Dennis Herring. In an interview for Ouch, My Ego! Shadow explained he became involved in the project after developing a friendship with some of the developers, who had been interested in collaborating with him "for a long time". In addition to contributing music, he served as the in-game host of the fictional radio station Radio Mirror Park. According to him, Shadow accepted the offer after being asked whether he wanted "to host the radio show and do songs for the soundtrack".

== Composition ==
"Old Love / New Love"
A 20-second sample of "Old Love / New Love". Christopher Monk from musicOMH called the featured verse a "desperate death throe", while Joseph Moore considered the millennial whoop "repetitive".

Shadow said the lyrics of "Old Love / New Love" are "a little bit about someone trying to get back into your life and have you repeat what has happened", while also suggesting that "sometimes doing everything over again, even though it's all messed up, it's also important". A reviewer for Tiny Mix Tapes described the song as depicting "a relationship of extremes". Ascher Kulich of The Tufts Daily, wrote that the protagonist continues to have feelings for his former partner despite her repeated emotional harm. The refrain includes the line "Drill me to the floor, this hurts even more than I expected it to do", which Christopher Monk from musicOMH described as a "desperate death throe". Andrew Unterberger interpreted the phone call from the ex-girlfriend as the basis for the song's "evocative and discomfiting lyrics".

Herring and Shadow record produced "Old Love / New Love", with the latter also performing bass guitar, drums, guitar, and keyboards. Ted Jensen and Joe LaPorta handled the track's mastering. Additional contributions included Wynne Bennett on keyboards, Ryan Gilligan on audio mixing, and Lacy contributed featured vocals.

Musically, while Shadow described "Old Love / New Love" as "dance-y", music critics categorized it as a dance, dance-pop, and house act, with influences from R&B and 1990s Hi-NRG. Tiny Mix Tapes compared the vocals to those of Michael McDonald, and wrote the song features a disco-influenced guitar, a Geiger counter drum program, and a common house beat. The track has a tempo of 116 beats per minute, and incorporates piano house elements, guitars, drum beats, and synthesizers. Kulich described the refrain as being supported by a "catchy, drum-and-piano [sound]"; while Jamie Milton defined it for DIY as a "gigantic trance chorus", and Dan Reilly, from Spin, said that during this verse the song becomes "an electrifying jam".

== Release and promotion ==
To promote GTA V, "Old Love / New Love" was released as a single, on September 13, 2013. The single cover features the black-and-white face of Shadow with his tongue sticking out; music critics Alex Young and Josiah Hughes complimented it. On September 24, Rockstar Games released the soundtrack album The Music of Grand Theft Auto V, and the song was featured on the Vol. 1: Original Music album.

In March 2015, Warner Bros. released Shadow's third album titled Eclipse, which included "Old Love / New Love". In that year he performed the song at various venues, including the Troubadour, in Los Angeles, the Music Hall of Williamsburg, in New York City, the South Side Music Hall, in Dallas, at Fordham University's WFUV radio station, following a cross-country train trek tour, and the Landmark Music Festival. In 2015, when asked about if he would film more music videos, Shadow he expressed interest in filming a music video for the song but noted that his touring schedule made it difficult. The song was remixed by American DJ Armand Van Helden that same year.

Shadow performed the song in 2022 at the Thalia Hall in Chicago.

== Critical reception ==
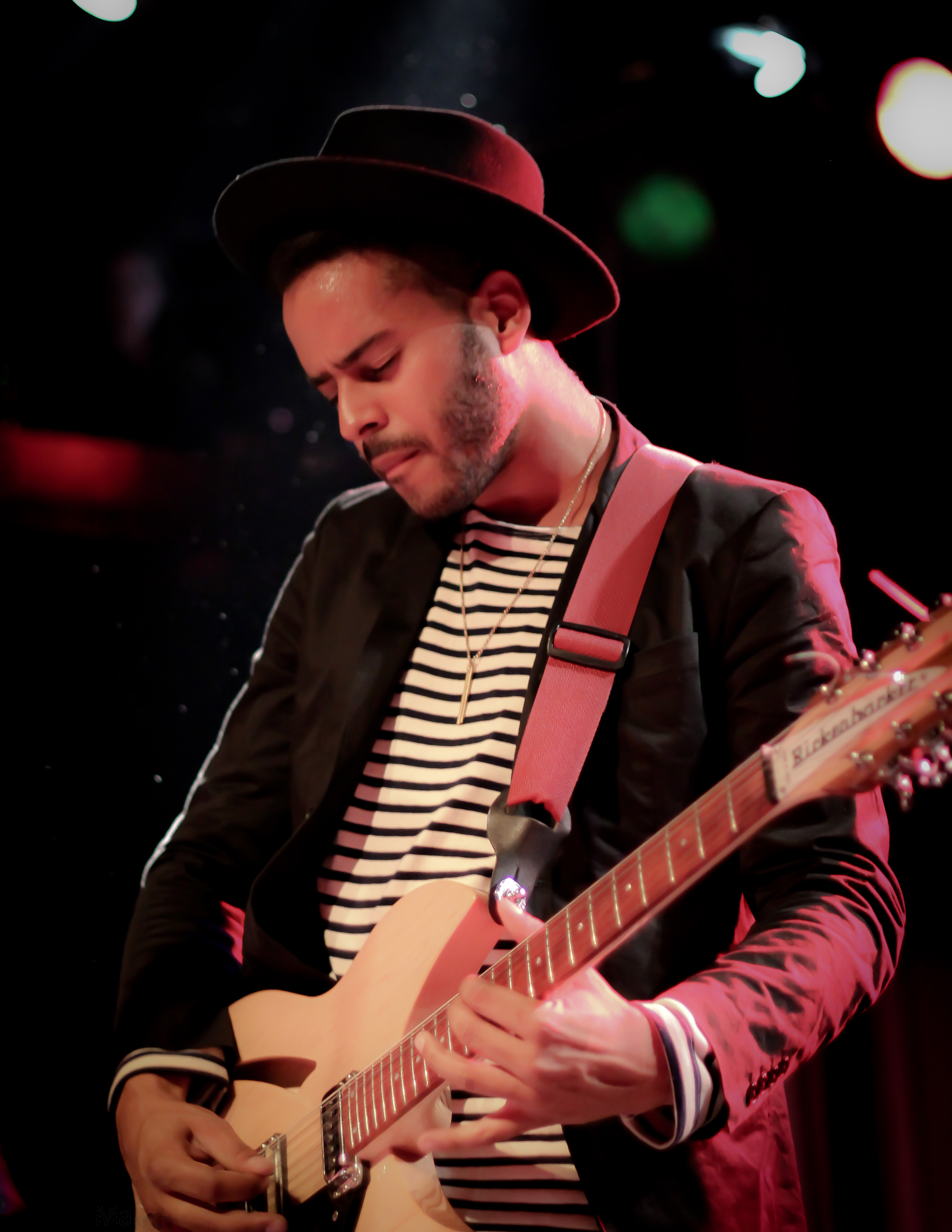
Twin Shadow (pictured in 2011) was praised by music critics for presenting a sound distinct from his earlier work.

Following its 2013 release, "Old Love / New Love" received positive reviews from music critics. Dan Reilly called the song "soulful", while Ian Cohen of Pitchfork highlighted its "gleaming piano" and Shadow's sincere "heatseaking lyricism". In Death and Taxes, Alex Moore praised its introduction as Shadow "makes you wade through about 30 seconds of wind-up" before the hook arrives around the 50-second mark. He called the payoff "good" and praised the song's conclusion, declaring it, unlike Lorde's "Team", which was released on the same day, "your new fucking jam".

Jamie Milton penned for DIY it fits to the "mass rampages and elaborate bank robberies" of GTA V, comparing it to David Guetta's music. Alex Young of Consequence of Sound found it more fitting for dance clubs than a "six-star killing spree". Gerrit Feenstra of KEXP-FM called it "one of the finest tracks" on The Music of Grand Theft Auto V soundtrack, a feeling Pat Levy echoed in a Consequence of Sound review, adding it is Shadow's best efforts ever, and marked it as an "essential track". Feenstra, in a separate review for the same radio station, added that the song's "over-dramatic [tone]" holds up even outside the context of the game. Rolling Stone ranked "Old Love / New Love" at number 71 on its list of the 100 Best Songs of 2013, comparing it to "Get Lucky" (2013) by Daft Punk and Pharrell Williams.

After the release of Eclipse, several music critics identified "Old Love / New Love" as a highlight. But some reviewers criticized the album precisely because the track stood out so strongly. In a review for The Observer, Daniel O'Boyle lamented the gap between the song's promise and the rest of the album, calling it a reminder of what the record "could have been". Joseph Moore noted that the harmonies with Lacy "hint at a darkness far greater than what is expressed on" the rest of the album. Tom Walters named it for DIY "an infectious dance floor belter" but was uneasy that it became the centerpiece of a collection of new material. Similarly, David Turner from Rolling Stone wrote that the song delivers "rave-level bliss on an album that more often sticks to cocksure swagger or somber introspection". Eric Webb of the Austin American-Statesman found difficult the album's musical direction when listening to the song.

In contrast, many reviewers praised the song's individual strengths. Embling for Tiny Mix Tapes praised the song and Shadow. Ian Gormely of Exclaim! called it a "sublime catharsis", while AllMusic's Heather Phares lauded its contemporary sound. Philip Cosores from Paste considered it Shadow's funniest song, while Jayson Greene from Pitchfork labeled it "sexy"; Sand Avidar-Walzer described it for Glide as "a straight-up summer house jam", and Ryan Leas wrote for Stereogum noted it would not be out of place in a club setting, a feeling shared by Andy Battagli, who also compared the song's sound to Daft Punk in a review for The Current.

In his analysis for Slant Magazine Jesse Cataldo examined it as upbeat and "less focused on grandiloquence" praising its "uncanny, off-kilter momentum". George Schlesinger noted for The Village Voice the song "[reminds] of the good stuff, the midnight mystique and inherent sexiness that help pull you back in", and Andrew Unterberger mentioned for Spin that although it is the most aged song from Eclipse, it is "the most exciting for Shadow's future", as well. However, Samuel Tolzmann from Pretty Much Amazing called it "cheesy", and Joseph Moore asserted for No Ripcord that its millennial whoop is monotonous.

== Track listing ==
The Music of Grand Theft Auto V, Vol. 1: Original Music (2013)
3. "Old Love / New Love" – 3:55

Armand Van Helden Remix (2015)
1. "Old Love / New Love [Armand Van Helden Remix]" (featuring D'Angelo Lacy) – 6:15

Eclipse (2015)
8. "Old Love / New Love" (featuring D'Angelo Lacy) – 3:49

== Credits ==
Liner notes adapted from Eclipse, published by Warner Bros. Records.

- George "Twin Shadow" Lewis Jr. – vocalist, producer, songwriter, bass, drums, guitar, keyboards
- D'Angelo Lacy – featured vocalist, songwriter
- Dennis Herring – co-producer, songwriter
- Wynne Bennett – keyboards
- Ryan Gilligan – audio engineer, additional mixing
- Ted Jensen – masterer
- Joe LaPorta – masterer
