= Twin Shadow (album) =

Studio album by Twin Shadow
- Released: July 9, 2021
- Studios: FAMA Studios, Santo Domingo
- Length: 31:02
- Label: Cheree Cheree
- Producer: Twin Shadow

Twin Shadow chronology
Broken Horses (2018)	Twin Shadow (2021)	Georgie (2025)

Professional ratings
Review scores
Source	Rating
Paste	7.9/10
Pitchfork	5.5/10

Twin Shadow is the fifth studio album by Dominican-American singer-songwriter George Lewis Jr., under his stage name Twin Shadow. It was released on July 9, 2021, on Lewis's own label, Cheree Cheree. According to a press release quoted by Paste magazine, the self-titled album "represents Lewis' biggest sonic shift to date and finds the artist reexamining the cherished sounds of the golden era of soul and punk that were part of his musical upbringing and embracing his Dominican heritage, recording portions of the album at FAMA Studios in the Dominican Republic".

== Track listing ==
All music is composed by George Lewis, except "Brown Sugar", composed by George Lewis and Raymond Brady III. All lyrics are written by George Lewis, except where noted.

1. "Alemania" (Lewis, William Peacock) – 3:55
2. "Sugarcane" – 3:30
3. "Johnny & Jonnie" – 2:49
4. "Get Closer" – 3:21
5. "Is There Any Love" (Lewis, Edward Bezalel) – 3:27
6. "Gated Windows" (Lewis, Jan Hammer, Ivona Reich) – 3:20
7. "Modern Man" – 2:31
8. "Lonestar" (Lewis, Bezalel) – 2:45
9. "Brown Sugar" (Lewis, Bezalel, Raymond Brady III) – 2:35
10. "I Wanna Be Here (Shotgun)" (Lewis, Bezalel) – 2:44

== Personnel ==
- George Lewis – vocals, bass guitar, electric guitar, piano, programming, production, mixing, engineering (all tracks); drums, keyboards (tracks 1–6, 8–10); saxophone (3–6, 8, 10), executive production
- Dave Cooley – mastering
- Kadhja Bonet – background vocals (track 1)
- D'Angelo Lacy – background vocals (track 4)
- Guillermo Brown – background vocals (track 4)
- Ligia Lewis – background vocals (track 4)
- Wynne Bennett – background vocals (track 4)
- Trevor Dandy – vocals (track 5)
- Dominique Xavier Taplin – keyboards (track 7)
- Ray Brady – electric guitar, programming (track 9)
- Edward Bezalel – executive production
