= The Flaming Lips with Neon Indian =

EP by The Flaming Lips and Neon Indian
- Released: March 23, 2011
- Recorded: Tarbox Road Studios (Cassadaga, New York); Wayne's house (Oklahoma City, Oklahoma)
- Genre: Experimental; psychedelia; electronic
- Length: 21:38
- Label: Lovely Sorts of Death; Warner Bros.
- Producer: The Flaming Lips; Dave Fridmann

Flaming Lips EP chronology
It Overtakes Me (2006)	The Flaming Lips with Neon Indian (2011)	Gummy Song Skull (2011)

Neon Indian chronology
Psychic Chasms (2009)	The Flaming Lips with Neon Indian (2011)	Era Extraña (2011)

The Flaming Lips with Neon Indian is an extended play by American rock band the Flaming Lips and American electronic music band Neon Indian. It was released on March 23, 2011 as part of The Flaming Lips 2011 series of monthly music releases. The 12-inch EP was a limited release pressed on special colored vinyl and distributed to select record stores in the United States. The song "Is David Bowie Dying?" was later included on the 2012 album The Flaming Lips and Heady Fwends.

== Background ==
Neon Indian frontman Alan Palomo met Flaming Lips lead vocalist Wayne Coyne during a show in Portland, Oregon: "He was like 'hey, man, we should do something!' We didn't know exactly what it was going to be; maybe we'd play some shows together, maybe we'd make some music. We just kept in contact, and by the time I was in the studio with Fridmann, the Lips had a couple of extra days lined up to record there that were overlapping, then Wayne said 'why don’t we show up a couple of days early, we'll fuck around in the studio and see what happens?' And, sure enough, the songs we made all came out of that period".

== Critical reception ==
Professional ratings
Review scores
Source	Rating
Pitchfork	7.4/10
Tiny Mix Tapes	3/5 stars

Reviews of The Flaming Lips with Neon Indian were positive. Marc Masters of Pitchfork gave the EP a rating of 7.4 out of 10.

== Track listing ==
All tracks are written by The Flaming Lips and Alan Palomo.

The Flaming Lips with Neon Indian track listing
No.	Title	Length
1.	"Is David Bowie Dying?"	6:44
2.	"Alan's Theremin"	8:09
3.	"You Don't Respond"	3:49
4.	"Do You Want New Wave or Do You Want the Truth Part 2"	2:56

== Personnel ==
Credits adapted from the liner notes of The Flaming Lips with Neon Indian.

- Derek Brown – performer
- Wayne Coyne – performer
- Steven Drozd – performer
- The Flaming Lips – production
- Dave Fridmann – production
- Michael Ivins – performer
- Alan Palomo – performer
- George Salisbury – design, layout
- Kliph Scurlock – performer
