= Eclipse (Twin Shadow album) =

Studio album by Twin Shadow
- Released: 16 March 2015
- Recorded: 2013–15
- Genre: Indie pop; new wave; synth-pop
- Length: 38:00
- Label: Warner Music Group
- Producer: Twin Shadow

Twin Shadow chronology
| Confess (2012) | Eclipse (2015) | Caer (2018) |

Singles from Eclipse
- 1. "Old Love / New Love" Released: September 12, 2013; 2. "To the Top" Released: April 15, 2014; 3. "Turn Me Up" Released: December 5, 2014; 4. "I'm Ready" Released: February 16, 2015

Eclipse is the third album by George Lewis Jr., released under his stage name, Twin Shadow. Lewis produced the album himself.

== Reception ==
Professional ratings
Aggregate scores
| Source | Rating |
|---|---|
| Metacritic | 62/100 |
Review scores
| Source | Rating |

The album was received with generally positive reviews, as opposed to a scathing Pitchfork review, resulting in his lowest-scoring album from the publication. The song "To the Top" was chosen to be used in two major projects, the film Paper Towns and the fourth episode of the episodic video game Tales from the Borderlands by Telltale Games, while "Old Love / New Love" was created and used for the video game Grand Theft Auto V.

== Track listing ==
| No. | Title | Writer(s) | Featured artist(s) | Length |
|---|---|---|---|---|
| 1. | "Flatliners" | George Lewis; Eric Green | | 4:19 |
| 2. | "When the Lights Turn Out" | George Lewis; Wynne Bennett; Daniel Nigro | | 3:30 |
| 3. | "To the Top" | George Lewis; Wynne Bennett | | 3:16 |
| 4. | "Alone" | George Lewis; Elizabeth Vanessa Harper | Lily Elise | 3:01 |
| 5. | "Eclipse" | George Lewis; Raja Kumari | | 3:04 |
| 6. | "Turn Me Up" | George Lewis; Wynne Bennett | | 3:21 |
| 7. | "I'm Ready" | George Lewis; Dennis Herring; Jesse Shatkin | | 3:32 |
| 8. | "Old Love / New Love" | George Lewis; Dennis Herring; D'Angelo Lacy | D'Angelo Lacy | 3:49 |
| 9. | "Half Life" | George Lewis; Nikolai Potthoff; Andrew Tyler | | 3:22 |
| 10. | "Watch Me Go" | George Lewis | | 3:53 |
| 11. | "Locked & Loaded" | | | 2:57 |
| Total length: | | | | 38:04 |

== Personnel ==
- George Lewis Jr. – vocals, production

== Charts ==
| Chart (2015) | Peak position |
|---|---|
| US Billboard 200 | 175 |
| US Top Alternative Albums (Billboard) | 13 |
