= Confess (album) =

Studio album by Twin Shadow
- Released: July 10, 2012
- Recorded: 2012
- Studio: RAD Studio, Music Friends, The House on Micheltorena, Jefferson Ave & Electric Lady Studios
- Genre: Indie pop; new wave; synth-pop
- Length: 43:08
- Label: 4AD
- Producer: Twin Shadow

Twin Shadow chronology
Forget (2010)	Confess (2012)	Eclipse (2015)

Confess is the second album by Dominican American artist Twin Shadow, released on July 10, 2012, through 4AD.

== Background and recording ==
Although its predecessor, Forget, reminisces over the past, Confess focuses on the present. George Lewis Jr. explained, "This album is about being on the road and the way my relationships have changed with people. I'm spelling out my reality as it is right now."

== Commercial performance and reception ==
Professional ratings
Aggregate scores
Source	Rating
AnyDecentMusic?	7.3/10
Metacritic	76/100
Review scores
Source	Rating
AllMusic	4/5 stars
The A.V. Club	A−
The Guardian	4/5 stars
Mojo	3/5 stars
NME	8/10
The Observer	4/5 stars
Pitchfork	8.6/10
Rolling Stone	3.5/5 stars
Spin	7/10
Uncut	8/10

Critical reception for Confess was positive. At Metacritic, which assigns a normalized rating out of 100 to reviews from mainstream critics, the album has received an average score of 76, based on 32 reviews.

Confess debuted with first week sales of 8,000 copies in the United States. As of March 2015, Confess has sold 30,000 copies in the United States.

== Track listing ==
All tracks are written by George Lewis Jr..

No.	Title	Length
1.	"Golden Light"	4:38
2.	"You Call Me On"	3:31
3.	"Five Seconds"	4:20
4.	"Run My Heart"	4:38
5.	"The One"	3:18
6.	"Beg for the Night"	3:42
7.	"Patient"	3:25
8.	"When the Movie's Over"	3:58
9.	"I Don't Care"	2:47
10.	"Be Mine Tonight" (hidden track "Mirror in the Dark" starts at 5:27)	8:49
Total length:		43:08

== Personnel ==
- George Lewis Jr. – vocals, LinnDrum programming, production
- Wynne Bennett – backing vocals

Other personnel

- Michael H. Brauer – mixing
- Ryan Gilligan – mix assistant, Pro Tools engineer
- Leon Kelly – assistant recording engineer

== Charts ==
Chart (2012)	Peak position
Belgian Albums (Ultratop Flanders)	162
UK Albums (OCC)	186
UK Independent Albums (OCC)	27
US Billboard 200	54
US Independent Albums (Billboard)	10
US Top Alternative Albums (Billboard)	13
US Top Rock Albums (Billboard)	18
