= Psychic Chasms =

Studio album by Neon Indian
- Released: October 13, 2009
- Recorded: 2009
- Genre: Chillwave; indie pop; electropop
- Length: 30:46
- Label: Lefse
- Producer: Alan Palomo

Neon Indian chronology
Psychic Chasms (2009)	The Flaming Lips with Neon Indian (2011)

Professional ratings
Aggregate scores
Source	Rating
AnyDecentMusic?	7.4/10
Metacritic	81/100
Review scores
Source	Rating
AllMusic	4/5 stars
The A.V. Club	A
Beats Per Minute	82%
Consequence of Sound	4/5 stars
Drowned in Sound	7/10
The Guardian	4/5 stars
Pitchfork	8.6/10
PopMatters	7/10
Spin	4/5 stars
Under the Radar	8/10

Psychic Chasms is the debut studio album by American electronic music band Neon Indian, released on October 13, 2009, by Lefse Records. Pitchfork placed the album at number 14 on its list of Top 50 Albums of 2009, while Rhapsody ranked it at number 17 on its list of 25 Best Albums of 2009.

A special edition of the album, titled Mind Ctrl: Psychic Chasms Possessed, was released digitally on August 31, 2010, and physically on September 28 by Fader Label, including a set of nine bonus remixes. In the United Kingdom, the special edition was released on September 28, 2010, by Static Tongues and added the track "Sleep Paralysist", while omitting two remixes.

== Track listing ==
All tracks are written by Alan Palomo.

No.	Title	Length
1.	"(AM)"	0:25
2.	"Deadbeat Summer"	4:03
3.	"Laughing Gas"	1:43
4.	"Terminally Chill"	3:34
5.	"(If I Knew, I'd Tell You)"	0:48
6.	"6669 (I Don't Know If You Know)"	3:21
7.	"Should Have Taken Acid with You"	2:21
8.	"Mind, Drips"	3:09
9.	"Psychic Chasms"	4:06
10.	"Local Joke"	3:27
11.	"Ephemeral Artery"	2:52
12.	"7000 (Reprise)"	0:57
Total length:		30:36

Mind Ctrl: Psychic Chasms Possessed bonus tracks
No.	Title	Length
13.	"Deadbeat Summer" (Toro y Moi Remix)	2:59
14.	"Should Have Taken Acid with You" (Body Language Remix)	3:19
15.	"(If I Knew, I'd Tell You)" (Javelin Remix)	3:10
16.	"Mind, Drips" (Bibio Remix)	4:13
17.	"Terminally Chill" (Yacht Remix)	3:53
18.	"Ephemeral Artery" (Darby Cicci of The Antlers – Fresh Breath Remix)	3:01
19.	"Psychic Chasms" (Twin Shadow Cover)	3:08
20.	"Local Joke" (Dntel Mix)	3:52
21.	"Psychic Chasms" (Anoraak Remix)	4:45
Total length:		63:06

Mind Ctrl: Psychic Chasms Possessed bonus tracks (UK edition)
No.	Title	Length
13.	"Sleep Paralysist"	4:34
14.	"Deadbeat Summer" (Toro y Moi Remix)	2:59
15.	"Should Have Taken Acid with You" (Body Language Remix)	3:19
16.	"(If I Knew, I'd Tell You)" (Javelin Remix)	3:10
17.	"Mind, Drips" (Bibio Remix)	4:13
18.	"Terminally Chill" (Yacht Remix)	3:53
19.	"Ephemeral Artery" (Darby Cicci of The Antlers – Fresh Breath Remix)	3:01
20.	"Local Joke" (Dntel Mix)	3:52
Total length:		59:47

Sample credits

- "Deadbeat Summer" contains a sample of "Izzat Love?" by Todd Rundgren.
- "Local Joke" contains a sample of "How About a Little Fanfare?" by Todd Rundgren.

== Personnel ==
Credits adapted from the liner notes of Psychic Chasms.

- Alan Palomo – recording, production
- Ronald Gierhart – guitar on "Terminally Chill" and "Ephemeral Artery"

== Charts ==
Chart (2009)	Peak position
US Heatseekers Albums (Billboard)	26
US Top Dance Albums (Billboard)	11
