= Twin Shadow =

American musician (born 1983)

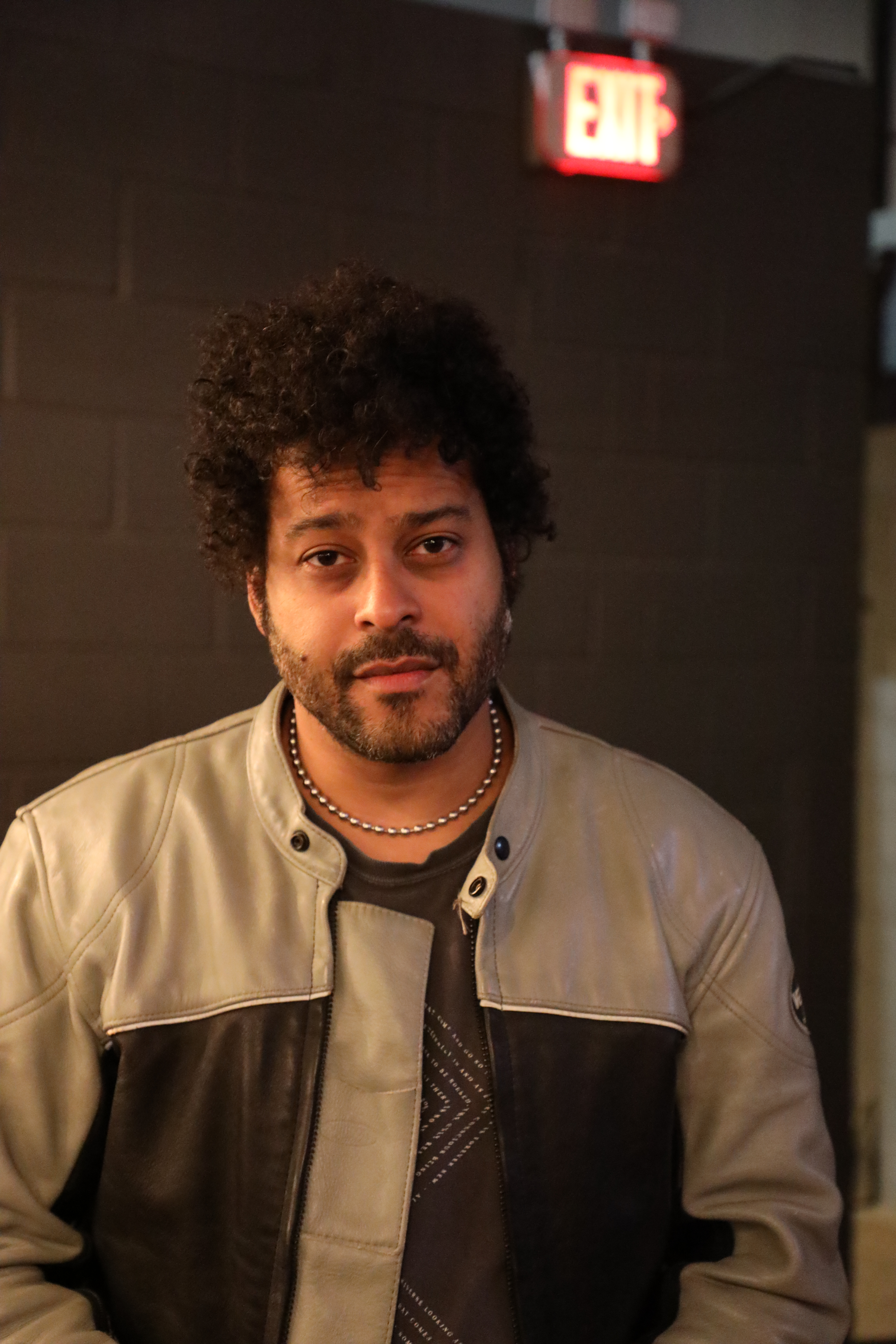
- Twin Shadow in 2025

Background information
- Born: George William Lewis Jr. March 30, 1983 (age 43); Santo Domingo, Dominican Republic
- Origin: Bushwick, Brooklyn, New York, U.S.
- Genres: Synth-pop; new wave; chillwave; indie pop; pop rock
- Occupations: Musician; producer; actor
- Instruments: Vocals; guitar; keyboards; bass guitar
- Years active: 2000–present
- Labels: Cheree Cheree; Warner Bros.; 4AD; Terrible
- Formerly of: Mad Man Films
- Website: twinshadow.net

George William Lewis Jr. (born March 30, 1983), better known by his stage name Twin Shadow, is a Dominican-born American musician, producer, and actor. He has released seven studio albums to date: Forget (2010), Confess (2012), Eclipse (2015), Caer (2018), Twin Shadow (2021), Georgie (2025), and Cadet (2025).

== Biography ==
=== Early life and career beginnings (1983–2009) ===
Lewis was born March 30, 1983 in the Dominican Republic and raised in Florida. His first exposure to music was singing in his church choir.

Around 2000, he moved to Boston and started the band Mad Man Films alongside Joseph Ciampini (drums) (of Hooray for Earth) and Zak Longo (bass) of Before Lazers. Mad Man Films released two records independently. In 2006, not satisfied with recording music for theatre and films, Lewis moved to Brooklyn, New York, and started the Twin Shadow project.

=== Forget (2010–2011) ===
Lewis's debut album, Forget, was released on November 15, 2010, on Terrible Records. It was produced by Chris Taylor of Grizzly Bear.

Forget received critical acclaim, appearing on numerous "album of the year" lists, including Pitchfork (No. 26) and Stereogum (No. 32). It has been described as "steeped in 1980s new wave", "building from streaks of haunting synth textures", having "sophisticated melodies", "R&B intimacy", and "poetic lyrics", and "hazily new wave-tinged pop". Twin Shadow was Rolling Stone's Band of the Week on October 7, 2010.

=== Confess (2012–2013) ===
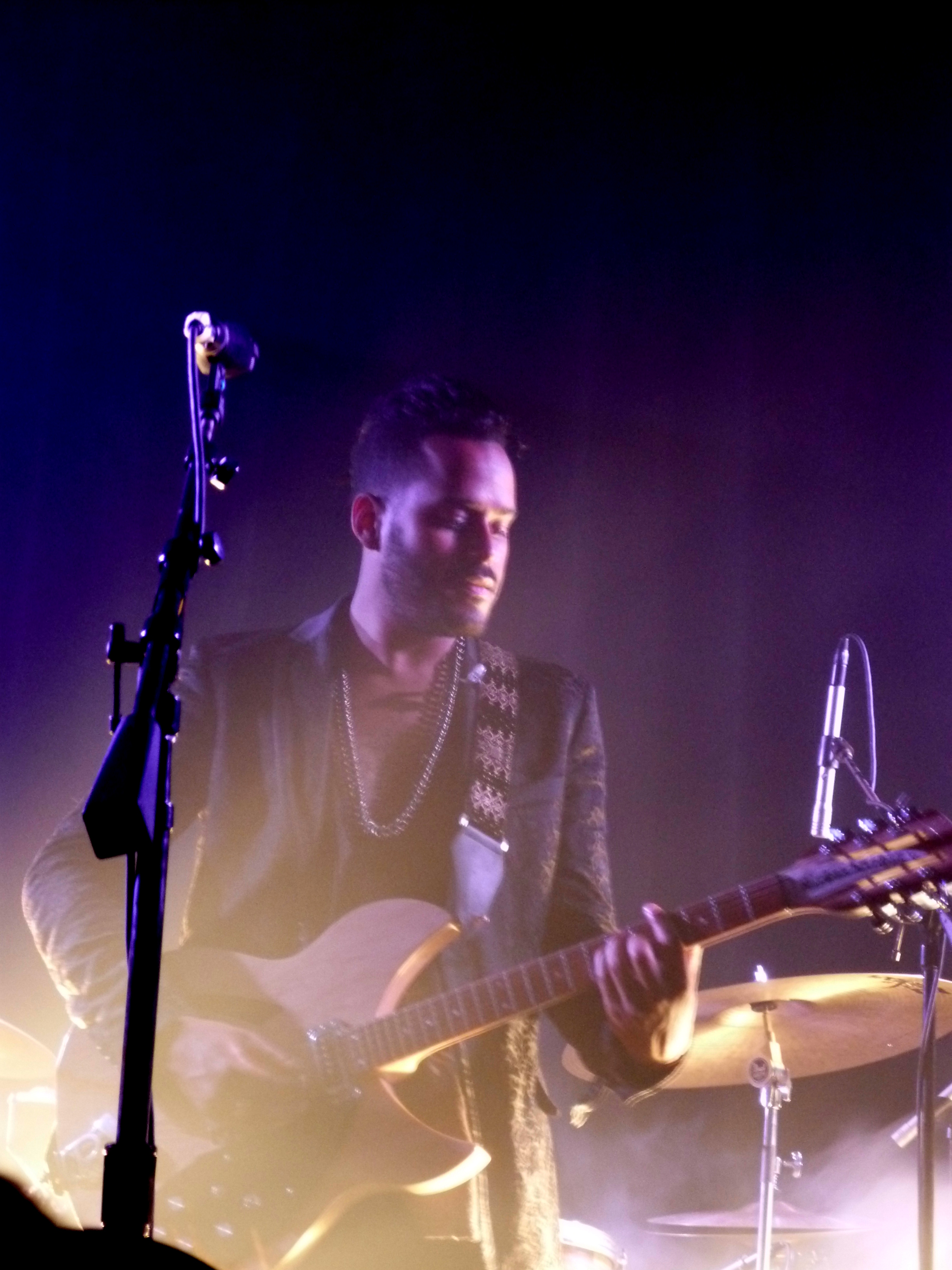
Twin Shadow at Lincoln Hall in Chicago, August 5, 2012

On July 10, 2012, Lewis released his follow-up album, Confess, which he produced himself. He gained inspiration for the album after being involved in a motorcycle accident in Boston. Two of the album's songs, "Five Seconds" and "Patient", were transformed into a music video saga that drew inspiration from Lewis's 2012 novel, The Night of the Silver Sun. The A.V. Club described the record as "filled with Morrissey-esque yelps and Human League-worthy choruses, [...] Twin Shadow manages to digest his influences rather than simply replicate them. Confess retains the humid fog that saturated Forget, but the instrumentation is brighter, louder, and sharper. Synthesizers punch through the atmosphere, and Lewis' exquisite croon floats above it all."

Confess debuted on the Billboard 200 at No. 54, and on the Top Rock Albums chart at No. 18. It had sold 30,000 copies in the US as of March 2015.

=== Eclipse and Night Rally (2014–2016) ===
After criticising his own work for being too elitist, Lewis set out to create a more approachable album, which he named Eclipse. It was his first with a major record label, Warner Music. Carl Wilson of Billboard magazine noted that Twin Shadow had left behind much of his "foggy layers of synths and drum machines", reminiscent of the likes of Depeche Mode and Simple Minds, in favor of a more contemporary sound.

Eclipse is also noted for being a near-complete departure from guitar-playing, a conscious decision by Lewis, according to a Pitchfork interview in January 2015.

The track "To the Top" was featured in the trailer for the film Paper Towns.

On April 17, 2015, Twin Shadow and his band and crew were involved in a tour bus crash. The driver, John Crawford, and drummer Andy Bauer were hospitalized and in serious condition. Lewis underwent reconstructive hand surgery following the accident.

On July 28, 2015, Twin Shadow released the Night Rally mixtape for free online, in conjunction with the announcement of tour by the same name. Due to Bauer's severe injuries from the April bus crash, the band retooled the songs in the live set, with samples and a drum machine to keep time. Twin Shadow toured the United States and Canada and opened a portion of Death Cab for Cutie's US tour.

Night Rally consists of recordings from 2010 to 2014. During his convalescence in Los Angeles following the bus crash, Lewis began to look through old hard drives. He left a message under the mixtape on SoundCloud, expressing how his discovery gave him a glimpse into the past five years:

The more I dug, the more I realized how much music was made in the last 5 years. Being home, I had the time and perspective to enjoy all the little impulses, embarrassing choices, and exciting moments that I couldn't bottle. There were also some songs that I couldn't understand why I never finished".

=== Caer, "Hollow Days", Broken Horses (2018) ===
Twin Shadow released his fourth studio album, Caer, on April 27, 2018, which was his final album with Warner Bros. On October 26, 2018, he launched his own label, Cheree Cheree, with the release of the single "Hollow Days", which incorporates the bachata sounds of his birthplace, the Dominican Republic. An EP titled Broken Horses was issued on December 26, 2018.

=== Twin Shadow (2021) ===
Twin Shadow released his fifth, self-titled studio album on July 9, 2021, on his own label, Cheree Cheree. According to a press release quoted by Paste magazine, the record "represents Lewis' biggest sonic shift to date and finds the artist reexamining the cherished sounds of the golden era of soul and punk that were part of his musical upbringing and embracing his Dominican heritage, recording portions of the album at FAMA Studios in the Dominican Republic".

== Fashion ==
Fashion is a notable interest for Lewis, as chronicled by The New York Times, who stated that he is "giving Kanye West a run for his money as the music world's leading fashion dilettante". Twin Shadow was a featured musician in Levi's "Live in Levi's" ad campaign. Since 2010, he has served as a muse and composer for Dao-Yi Chow and Maxwell Osbourne, the designers of the CFDA-award-winning fashion line "Public School". In 2015, Twin Shadow composed the music for their spring/summer 2015 and spring/summer 2016 runway shows, which took place during New York Fashion Week. In addition to composing music for Public School, Lewis has modeled for the clothing brand, both on and off the runway.

== Writing ==
In 2012, Lewis published a novel titled The Night of the Silver Sun.

== Discography ==
=== Studio albums ===
Title	Album details	Peak chart positions				
Title	Album details	US	US Heat	BEL (FL)	UK	UK Indie
Forget	Released: November 15, 2010; Label: 4AD, Terrible	—	24	—	—	—
Confess	Released: July 10, 2012; Label: 4AD	54	—	162	186	27
Eclipse	Released: March 16, 2015; Label: WMG	175	—	—	—	—
Caer	Released: April 27, 2018; Label: WMG	—	—	—	—	—
Twin Shadow	Released: July 9, 2021; Label: Cheree Cheree	—	—	—	—	—
Georgie	Released: March 14, 2025; Label: Cheree Cheree	—	—	—	—	—
Cadet	Released: November 20, 2025; Label: Cheree Cheree	—	—	—	—	—
"—" denotes album that did not chart or was not released

=== EPs ===
- Broken Horses (2018)

=== Mixtapes ===
- Night Rally (2015)

=== Singles ===
- "Yellow Balloon" (2010)
- "Castles in the Snow" (2010)
- "I Can't Wait" (2010)
- "Slow" (2010)
- "At My Heels" (2010)
- "Changes" (non-album single, 2011)
- "Five Seconds" (2012)
- "Patient" (2012)
- "The One" (Live on KCRW) (2012)
- "Old Love / New Love" featuring D'Angelo Lacy (2013)
- "To the Top" (2014)
- "Turn Me Up" (2015)
- "I'm Ready" (2015)
- "Saturdays" featuring Haim (2018)
- "Little Woman" (2018)
- "Brace" featuring Rainsford (2018)
- "Hollow Days" (non-album single, 2018)
- "Only for the Broken-Hearted" (non-album single, 2019)
- "Truly" (non-album single, 2019)
- "Crushed" (non-album single, 2019)
- "Slave" (non-album single, 2020)
- "Johnny & Jonnie" (2021)
- "Alemania" (2021)
- "Get Closer" (2021)
- "Sugarcane / Lonestar" (2021)

=== Remixes and collaborations ===
- Neon Indian – "Psychic Chasms" (cover, 2009)
- Bear in Heaven – "Lovesick Teenagers" (Twin Shadow Remix, 2009)
- Hooray for Earth – "Surrounded by Your Friends" (Twin Shadow Remix, 2010)
- Surfer Blood – "Floating Vibes" (Twin Shadow Remix, 2010)
- N.E.R.D. feat. Daft Punk – "Hypnotize Remix" (Twin Shadow Remix, 2010)
- Gypsy & the Cat – "Jona Vark Remix" (Twin Shadow Remix, 2010)
- Oh Land – "White Nights" (Twin Shadow Remix, 2011)
- Lady Gaga – "Born This Way" (Twin Shadow Remix, 2011)
- Wim – "See You Hurry" (Twin Shadow Remix, 2011)
- Flume (musician) – "Sleepless" (featuring Twin Shadow, 2012)
- Neon Indian – "Hex Girlfriend" (Twin Shadow Remix, 2013)
- Goldfrapp – "Thea" (Twin Shadow Remix, 2013)
- MS MR – "Hurricane" (Twin Shadow Remix, 2013)
- Sky Ferreira – "Everything Is Embarrassing" (Twin Shadow Remix, 2013)
- SKATERS – "Deadbolt" (Twin Shadow Remix, 2013)
- Haim – "Edge" (co-writer, 2013)
- Zeds Dead – "Somewhere Else" (featuring Twin Shadow, 2014)
- Transviolet- "Girls Your Age" (Twin Shadow Remix, 2015)
- Big Data (music project) – "Perfect Holiday" (featuring Twin Shadow, 2015)
- Zeds Dead – "Stardust" (featuring Twin Shadow, 2016)
- Alt-J Feat. Pusha-T – "In Cold Blood" (Twin Shadow Remix, 2017)
- Rainsford – "Intentions" (featuring Twin Shadow, 2018)
- The Album Leaf – "Cry When I'm Nervous" (with Twin Shadow)

=== UNDER THE CVRS ===
In 2013, Twin Shadow launched the UNDER THE CVRS series, in which he covers requested songs from various artists.

- "I'm Not in Love" (10cc) August 2013
- "I'm on Fire" (Bruce Springsteen) September 2013
- "Silent All These Years" (Tori Amos) September 2013
- "Perfect Day" (Lou Reed) October 2013
- "With or Without You" (U2) November 2013
- "Cupid" (112) January 2014
- "There Is a Light That Never Goes Out" (The Smiths) February 2014

== Acting ==
In 2013, Lewis appeared as a fictional version of himself in the video game Grand Theft Auto V as a DJ for the in-game radio station Radio Mirror Park. His songs "Shooting Holes", "Forget", and "Old Love / New Love", a track he made specifically for the video game, were featured on the station.

He made his feature film debut in the 2018 science fiction action Western film Future World.

== Television appearances ==
- Conan

Episode 1,183 (July 10, 2018) (song performed: "Saturdays")

- Late Night with Jimmy Fallon

Episode 1.435 (2011) (song performed: "Castles in the Snow")

- Conan

Episode 578 (June 3, 2014) (song performed: "To the Top")
Season 22 Episode No. 27 (Tuesday, February 17, 2015) (song performed: "Turn Me Up")

- Late Show with David Letterman
