= Forget (Twin Shadow album) =

Studio album by Twin Shadow
- Released: November 15, 2010
- Recorded: 2010, New York City
- Genres: New wave; synth-pop; chillwave; alt-pop; electropop; R&B
- Length: 41:17
- Labels: 4AD; Terrible
- Producers: Prince Language; Chris Taylor; Twin Shadow

Twin Shadow chronology
Forget (2010)	Confess (2012)

Forget is the debut studio album by American musician Twin Shadow (George William Lewis Jr.). It was produced in Brooklyn, New York by Chris Taylor of Grizzly Bear.

The album was largely inspired by a long-distance relationship Lewis had with a Danish person as well as his impressions of love and relationships prior to experiencing them, having observed them in other people. Swedish filmmaker Ingmar Bergman, particularly his 1957 film The Seventh Seal, was influential to the album's songwriting and editing process.

The songs "Forget" and "Shooting Holes" can be heard in the game Grand Theft Auto V, on the radio station Radio Mirror Park, which features Twin Shadow as a DJ.

As of 2011, it has sold 10,985 copies in the United States, according to Nielsen SoundScan.

== Critical reception ==
Professional ratings
Aggregate scores
Source	Rating
AnyDecentMusic?	7.7/10
Metacritic	84/100
Review scores
Source	Rating
AllMusic	4/5 stars
The A.V. Club	A−
The Boston Phoenix	3.5/4 stars
Mojo	4/5 stars
NME	8/10
Pitchfork	8.4/10
PopMatters	9/10
Q	3/5 stars
Spin	7/10
Uncut	4/5 stars

Under the Radar described Lewis as a "solid songwriter" and Forget as "very much an '80s affair, full of chorused guitars, 808 drum machine sounds, big ol' synth stabs, and Lewis' distinct croon." The magazine drew comparisons to Duran Duran, the Pet Shop Boys, New Order, Depeche Mode, and OMD. Pitchfork placed the record at number 26 on its Top 50 Albums of 2010 list.

== Track listing ==
All songs written by Twin Shadow.

No.	Title	Length
1.	"Tyrant Destroyed"	3:28
2.	"When We're Dancing"	4:11
3.	"I Can't Wait"	3:53
4.	"Shooting Holes"	3:28
5.	"At My Heels"	3:36
6.	"Yellow Balloon"	4:22
7.	"Tether Beat"	3:35
8.	"Castles in the Snow"	2:52
9.	"For Now"	4:08
10.	"Slow"	3:54
11.	"Forget"	3:50
Total length:		41:17

The CD tracklist slightly differs from the one above.

No.	Title	Length
1.	"Tyrant Destroyed"	3:28
2.	"When We're Dancing"	4:11
3.	"Slow"	3:54
4.	"Shooting Holes"	3:28
5.	"At My Heels"	3:36
6.	"Yellow Balloon"	4:22
7.	"Tether Beat"	3:35
8.	"Castles in the Snow"	2:52
9.	"For Now"	4:08
10.	"I Can't Wait"	3:53
11.	"Forget"	3:50
Total length:		41:17

== Personnel ==
- Twin Shadow – vocals, Roland Juno-60, Oberheim DMX programming, Roland TR-808 programming, photography
- Chris Taylor – producer, mixer
- Prince Language – producer, additional (on "Shooting Holes" and "Forget")
- Emily Lazar – mastering
- Joe LaPorta – mastering
- Samantha West – cover photography
