= Caer (album) =

Studio album by Twin Shadow
- Released: April 27, 2018
- Genre: New wave; art pop
- Length: 41:07
- Label: Warner Music Group; Reprise
- Producer: George Lewis Jr.; BJ Burton; Nate Donmoyer; Wynne Bennett

Twin Shadow chronology
Eclipse (2015)	Caer (2018)	Broken Horses (2018)

Professional ratings
Aggregate scores
Source	Rating
AnyDecentMusic?	6.7/10
Metacritic	69/100
Review scores
Source	Rating
DIY	3/5 stars
Drowned in Sound	7/10
Exclaim!	5/10
The Independent	4/5 stars
Loud and Quiet	8/10
PopMatters	6/10
Slant Magazine	2.5/5 stars

Caer is the fourth studio album by Dominican-American singer-songwriter George Lewis Jr., under his stage name Twin Shadow. It was released on April 27, 2018 under Warner Music Group.

== Release ==
On February 22, 2018, Twin Shadow announced the release of the new album, alongside two new singles "Little Woman" and "Saturdays", which features a collaboration by Haim. On March 16, 2018, the next single "Brace" was released, with a collaboration by Rainsford.

== Critical reception ==
Caer was met with "generally favorable" reviews from critics. At Metacritic, which assigns a weighted average rating out of 100 to reviews from mainstream publications, this release received an average score of 69, based on 10 reviews. Aggregator Album of the Year gave the release a 69 out of 100 based on a critical consensus of 10 reviews.

== Track listing ==
Caer track listing
No.	Title	Writer(s)	Producer(s)	Length
1.	"Brace" (featuring Rainsford)	George Lewis Jr.; Ethan Silverman; Wynne Bennett; Rainey Qualley	George Lewis Jr.; Wynne Bennett	3:26
2.	"Saturdays" (featuring Haim)	Lewis Jr.; Este Haim; Danielle Haim; Alana Haim	Lewis Jr.; BJ Burton	2:52
3.	"Sympathy" (featuring Rainsford)	Lewis Jr.; Bennett; Edward Bezalel; Qualley	Lewis Jr.; Bennett	2:52
4.	"18 Years"	Lewis jr.	Lewis Jr.; Burton; Bennett; Nate Donmoyer	3:18
5.	"Little Woman"	Lewis Jr.; Bennett	Lewis Jr.; Bennett	3:32
6.	"When You're Wrong"	Lewis Jr.; Bezalel; Bennett	Lewis Jr.; Bennett	3:29
7.	"Twins Theme"	Lewis Jr.	Lewis Jr.	1:28
8.	"Littlest Things"	Lewis Jr.; Bennett; Donmoyer	Donmoyer; Lewis Jr.	3:43
9.	"Too Many Colors"	Bezalel; Lewis Jr.	Burton; Lewis Jr.	3:46
10.	"Rust"	Lewis Jr.	Lewis Jr.	1:34
11.	"Obvious People"	Lewis Jr.	Lewis Jr.	3:42
12.	"Runaway"	Lewis Jr.; Bezalel	Lewis Jr.; Donmoyer; Burton; Bennett	3:42
13.	"Bombs Away"	Lewis Jr.; Bezalel	Lewis Jr.; Burton	2:36

== Personnel ==
Musicians

- George Lewis Jr – lead vocals, producer
- Rainey Qualley – vocals
- Alana Haim – vocals
- Danielle Haim – vocals
- Este Haim – vocals

Production

- Wynne Bennett – producer
- Nate Donmoyer – engineer
- BJ Burton – mixer
