= Neon Indian =

American band

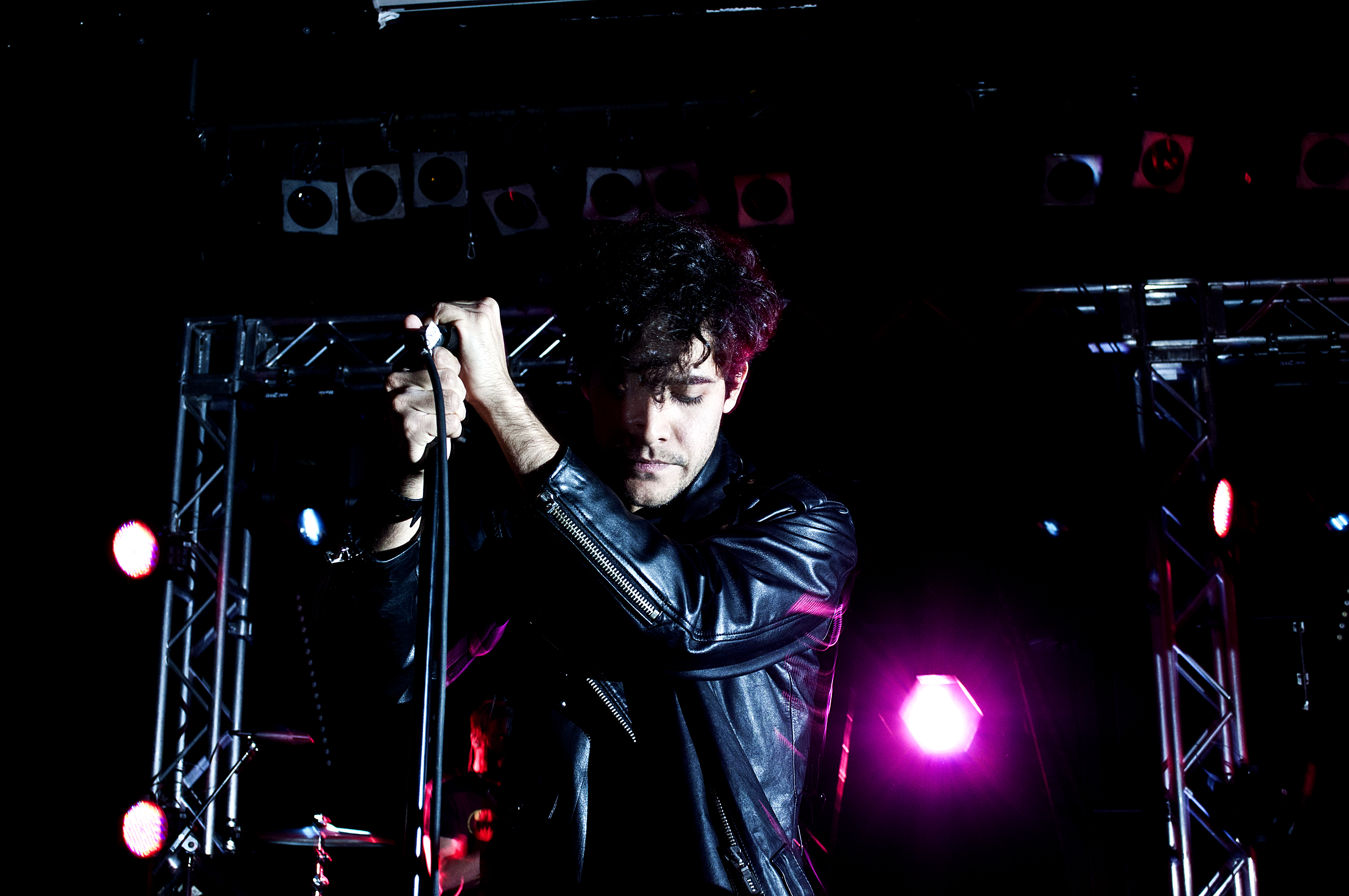
- Alan Palomo of Neon Indian performing in 2011

Background information
- Origin: Denton, Texas, US
- Genres: Electronic; chillwave; glo-fi; synth-pop; hypnagogic pop
- Years active: 2008–present
- Labels: Lefse; Fader Label; Static Tongues; Mom + Pop; Transgressive; Arts & Crafts México
- Members: Alan Palomo; Drew Erickson; Jason Faries; Jorge Palomo; Max Townsley
- Past members: Ronald Gierhart; Leanne Macomber; Joshua McWhirter
- Website: neonindian.com

Neon Indian is an American electronic music band from Denton, Texas. The music is composed by Alan Palomo (born July 24, 1988), who is also part of the band Ghosthustler and releases solo music under his birth name and the stage name VEGA. The project has been characterized as defining the 2010s music genre chillwave.

The band's debut studio album, Psychic Chasms, was released in October 2009 to favorable reviews. Rolling Stone named Neon Indian one of the best new bands of 2010. Their second studio album, Era Extraña, was released in September 2011, followed by Vega Intl. Night School in October 2015.

== History ==
=== Beginnings ===
Palomo was born in Monterrey, Mexico, and later moved to San Antonio, Texas at the age of 5. He relocated to Denton, Texas for college at the University of North Texas. Palomo had already been writing and performing music before the inception of Neon Indian, in his projects Ghosthustler and VEGA, through much of his high school years. Shortly before the release of Psychic Chasms, Palomo said he planned on releasing another album as VEGA, although this did not happen. In an interview, Palomo cites his father as a musical influence, "just because that's how he makes his living—he had a brief stint in the late 70s and early 80s as a Mexican pop star." Palomo said that he sampled some of his father's material in his work with Neon Indian. Spin also observed the influence of OMD and New Order.

The name Neon Indian was conceived by an ex-girlfriend of Palomo's, Alicia Scardetta, who was also the subject of their song "Should Have Taken Acid with You". The song was originally presented as a musical apology for a missed acid date. Her positive reaction to the song spurred Palomo to continue writing more songs as Neon Indian.

=== 2009–2010: Psychic Chasms ===
Neon Indian's debut album, Psychic Chasms, was released on October 13, 2009, by Lefse Records. The album was designated Best New Music by Pitchfork, and Spin magazine praised it as a "dreamy collage of samples and synth tones". Pitchfork named Psychic Chasms the 14th best album of 2009, while including the songs "Deadbeat Summer" and "Should Have Taken Acid with You" at numbers 13 and 74, respectively, on its list of Top 100 Tracks of 2009. The project was associated with the 2000s lo-fi style alternately known as chillwave, glo-fi and hypnagogic pop, while also incorporating synth-pop.

Psychic Chasms was re-released in September 2010, including a set of bonus remixes titled Mind Ctrl: Psychic Chasms Possessed. In the United Kingdom, the reissue also contains "Sleep Paralysist" as a bonus track.

=== 2011–2013: Era Extraña and Errata Anex ===
Recorded in Helsinki, Finland during the winter of 2010, Neon Indian's second studio album, Era Extraña (a Spanish-language title, literally "Strange Era" or "She Was Strange" or "She Was a Stranger", depending on the context), was released September 13, 2011 by Mom + Pop Music and Palomo's Static Tongues imprint. Soon after the album's release, the band embarked on a North American tour, featuring Purity Ring and Com Truise as opening acts.

A short video filmed in Helsinki was released on April 20, 2011, featuring an excerpt from the track "Heart: Attack", the first of a three-part instrumental piece that appeared on the album. It was followed by "Heart: Decay" and "Heart: Release".

On September 4, 2011, the album was made available to stream in full on NPR's "First Listen" for a limited time.

The extended play Errata Anex was released on April 9, 2013, containing remixes of five tracks from Era Extraña by Optimo, Boyd Rice, Patten, Actress and Twin Shadow. Palomo said of the EP, "These remixes are a small collection found along the way of my year on the road while we were touring Era Extraña. The artists were chosen by whatever most consistently blared out of my headphones".

Neon Indian contributed their song "Change of Coast" exclusively to the soundtrack to the video game Grand Theft Auto V, released on September 24, 2013. Their song "Polish Girl" was later added to the Xbox One, PlayStation 4 and PC versions of the game.

=== 2014–2019: Vega Intl. Night School ===
On December 30, 2014, Palomo announced via his Instagram account that he was working on a new album, slated to be released sometime in 2015. the idea of Vega is intended to be really just dance music. Just true, one-speed — a clean, solid version of poppy, dance electronic music. It's gonna have more groovy bass lines, more straightforward drums."

On May 26, 2015, the single "Annie" was released. On August 13, 2015, Palomo revealed that the band's third studio album would be titled Vega Intl. Night School, which was released on October 16. At the same time, he also released "Slumlord", the second single off that album. Third single "The Glitzy Hive" was released on October 8.

In March 2016, Downtown Music Publishing and indie label Mom + Pop Music announced a joint publishing venture. The first signing as part of the new partnership was a publishing deal with Neon Indian. In an April 2016 interview, Palomo said, "If Neon Indian were to continue at all, it would have to undergo some aesthetic overhaul to remain interesting to me", and that his immediate focus after touring behind Vega Intl. Night School would be filmmaking.

In March 2017, Palomo appeared in director Terrence Malick's film Song to Song, opposite Rooney Mara. He also composed the score for the science fiction film Everything Beautiful is Far Away. On November 14, 2019, the single "Toyota Man" was released, marking Neon Indian's first release of new music in four years.

=== 2023–present: Alan Palomo's solo career ===
On May 1, 2023, Palomo released the single "Nudista Mundial '89" featuring Mac DeMarco, his first single under his own name. He released a second single, "Stay-at-Home DJ", on June 6, 2023, along with the announcement of his debut solo album, World of Hassle, released on September 15, 2023.

== Tour and live performances ==
When performing, Palomo is joined on stage by a live band, which originally consisted of Jason Faries (drums), Leanne Macomber (keyboard, vocals) and Lars Larsen (live visuals). Ronald Gierhart played guitar and sang in the live group prior to 2011, leaving to finish college and begin a solo project called Ronnie Heart.

On February 11, 2010, Neon Indian made their live television debut on NBC's Late Night with Jimmy Fallon, performing a medley of the songs "Terminally Chill" and "Ephemeral Artery".

Palomo later revised the live lineup, with only Faries remaining from the original backing band. Added were keyboardist Drew Erickson, guitar and synth player Max Townsley, and Palomo's brother, bassist Jorge Palomo. During the 2019 tour, Brad Oberhofer joined on synth.

== Discography ==
=== Studio albums ===
Title	Album details	Peak chart positions				
Title	Album details	US	US Dance	US Rock	AUS Hit.	JPN
Psychic Chasms	Released: October 13, 2009; Label: Static Tongues, Lefse; Formats: CD, LP, digital download	— (Note: Psychic Chasms did not enter the US Billboard 200, but peaked at number 26 on the US Heatseekers Albums Chart.)	11	—	—	—
Era Extraña	Released: September 7, 2011; Label: Static Tongues, Mom + Pop; Formats: CD, LP, digital download	74	4	21	—	193
Vega Intl. Night School	Released: October 16, 2015; Label: Mom + Pop; Formats: CD, LP, digital download	100	—	14	20	—
"—" denotes a recording that did not chart or was not released in that territory.

=== Extended plays ===
- Well Known Pleasures (2009) (As VEGA)
- The Flaming Lips with Neon Indian (2011)
- Errata Anex (2013)

=== Singles ===
Year	Song	Peak chart positions		Album
Year	Song	US Sales	MEX Air.	Album
2010	"Deadbeat Summer"	—	27	Psychic Chasms
2010	"Sleep Paralysist"	—	17	Psychic Chasms
2011	"Fallout"	7	—	Era Extraña
2011	"Polish Girl"	—	39	Era Extraña
2011	"Hex Girlfriend"	—	—	Era Extraña
2015	"Annie"	—	47	Vega Intl. Night School
2015	"Slumlord"	—	—	Vega Intl. Night School
2015	"The Glitzy Hive"	—	—	Vega Intl. Night School
2019	"Toyota Man" (ft. Daniela Lalita)	—	—	Non-album single

=== Music videos ===
Year	Title	Director(s)
2010	"Sleep Paralysist"	Aaron Brown and Ben Chappell
2010	"6669 (I Don't Know If You Know)"	João Machado
2010	"Mind, Drips"	Lars Larsen
2011	"Polish Girl"	Tim Nackashi
2012	"Fallout"	Lilfuchs
2015	"Slumlord"	Tim Nackashi and Alan Palomo
2016	"Annie"	Alan Palomo
2019	"Toyota Man"	Alan Palomo
