= Prey//IV =

Studio album by Alice Glass
- Released: 16 February 2022
- Recorded: 2018 – 2021
- Studios: Misery Labs, Los Angeles, California
- Genre: Electronic
- Length: 32:16
- Label: Eating Glass Records
- Producer: Jupiter Keyes

Alice Glass chronology
Alice Glass (2017)	Prey//IV (2022)

Singles from Prey//IV
- 1. "Suffer and Swallow" Released: 6 January 2021; 2. "Baby Teeth" Released: 19 November 2021; 3. "Fair Game" Released: 8 December 2021; 4. "Love Is Violence" Released: 28 January 2022

Prey//IV (stylized as PREY//IV) is the debut studio album by Canadian singer-songwriter Alice Glass. It was released on 16 February 2022 by Eating Glass Records. It is her first collection of solo material since the release of her self-titled EP released five years prior. The album title and track listing were revealed on 19 November 2021. The release of the album was preceded by four singles, "Suffer and Swallow", "Baby Teeth", "Fair Game", and "Love Is Violence". To promote the album, Glass embarked on a 15-date tour of the United States, the Traumabond Tour, from the 7 September to 31 October 2022.

== Background ==
Following the release of her self-titled EP, Alice Glass released a statement in October 2017 which accused former Crystal Castles bandmate Ethan Kath of sexual abuse during her tenure with the group. Following this, Glass was subject to a defamation lawsuit from Kath (which was later dismissed, with Alice winning $21,000 in legal fees) and online harassment. "Everything I did, it felt like there was a lot of people that wanted me to crash and burn and kill myself," she later recalled to DIY. "It's horrible, especially this picking of sides, because people label you a liar for attention and that's that. Seeing all these fans that you've met in person now harassing you online… It's just like, I don't know… surreal…"

After releasing a few more singles through 2018, including "Cease and Desist", "Mine" and "I Trusted You", Glass decided to stop releasing singles and instead release a new record to channel her experiences. "[I] felt the pressure to have a record speak for my experience, rather than having songs and singles here and there that I was working on at the time. I wanted [Prey//IV] to be a statement."

== Recording ==
The album was produced by Jupiter Keyes, formerly of the noise rock band Health, and who also helped produce Alice Glass's self-titled EP. "I've always loved Jupiter's production. He has an ability to make sounds sound really sad," she told Dork. "I definitely like sad music, but I don't listen to it all the time. I like to dance when I'm sad." The duo worked on the songs together in their basement, which is listed in the album credits as "Misery Labs".

Glass had written hundreds of songs since 2015, but only begun to narrow it down and begin recording the album in 2018. Most of the album was written prior to her therapist getting her started on medication for depression and anxiety in 2021. "It was a really dark time", Glass reflected to The Sydney Morning Herald. "I was numb and catatonic, going through the motions and routines, figuring out why everything was so f---ed up, and [understanding] that it wasn't my fault was a huge step." Glass intends to release more of the music she and Keyes have recorded in the future. "I'm just going to open the floodgates, honestly, because we [Keyes and I] have so many songs."

== Composition and lyrics ==
"If I could take a pill and erase all my memories, I would. I didn't think I would be here – I thought I'd be dead for sure. I was very suicidal as a teenager and young person… There's so much suffering in the world, and I bring [up my difficult experiences] now because, in a weird way, every time I open up about this, somebody writes me or sends a really nice message where they can relate to what I'm saying. It's been really helpful for me psychologically to put things out. That's what this record is like for me: I'm going to put my pain out into the world and then I don't own it any more."

— Alice Glass discussing the album's lyrical themes to NME

Prey//IV's lyrics mainly have themes of domestic violence and abuse.

"Love Is Violence" was described by Glass as a song about manipulative and toxic partnerships. "Any person who uses their partner's 'love' to control, use, and hurt them is using one of the most cruel and disgusting manipulative tactics in human experience. Disguising power struggles and calling it 'love', it's a form of violence against a partner. I want to help people to see those red flags and encourage them to remove themselves from those types of toxic situations", Glass explained in a press release.

"Baby Teeth" was described by Glass as "...probably the darkest and most hopeless track on my record, but it sounds misleadingly hopeful." The song itself is about "embracing despair. It understands that violence against the vulnerable is inevitable, and it probably always will be."

The song "Fair Game" is written from the perspective of an abuser, and she used real quotes from her own abuse in the lyrics. "It's a song made of actual phrases that were used in repetition to gaslight me, to intentionally keep me confused and weakened", Alice Glass explained in a statement upon the song's release. Glass described the song's creation as "cathartic". She later disclosed that the song was released at the suggestion of late Scottish producer Sophie, who wanted to make a remix of the song.

== Title and artwork ==
"It's my fourth LP. And I was thinking about how even just me saying that would enrage people I've never met, and how ridiculous that is. So yeah. It's a little cheeky. It's also "pray for Alice Glass". Pray for me. But having the Roman numerals in there and having "IV" in there is kind of a cheeky fuck-you. Who's going to tell me what I can name my own record? It's going to be me. I've been in the game for over 10 years, and I'm proud of the actual work that I did. It's awkward to talk about, let alone celebrate. But I am proud of the work that I've done."

— Glass explaining the album title to Bandcamp

In an interview with NME, Glass stated the album title is directly a reference to her previous band, Crystal Castles, and the numbering system on their albums (II) and (III), with Glass considering Prey//IV to be her fourth album; "Look at the writing credits throughout the years, and I am the most consistent songwriter on the CC records."

Glass has also stated the album cover, created by Astra Zero, is also directly a reference to the cover of Crystal Castles' debut release Alice Practice, stating on Twitter that "there is no such thing as coincidence".

== Release and promotion ==
After the record was initially completed, Glass left her label, Loma Vista Recordings, after a year-long legal battle. Glass felt ignored by the label, and stated she handed in "pretty much the same record" to no response from the label. The legal troubles surrounding her departure delayed the album, but also allowed Glass and Keyes to work on the songs further. By the time she had left the label, Glass had enough money to self-fund, and decided to release her music via her own label, Eating Glass Records. "The fact you don't have to rely on a label now is a big thing. Any artist can start and not have to be reliant on a label at all. Not having to deal with the weird business side, which I've never been good at. I feel like there's more empathy in general. The new generation of alternative girls have been really supportive, as well as my younger SoundCloud rap friends. It was a different situation for me because I was only talking to people I was working with – a lot of men older than me."

=== Promotion ===
Glass released the single "Suffer and Swallow" on 6 January 2021, which was announced as the first single from her debut album. The song was accompanied by a stop-motion music video by Lucas David.

On 19 November 2021, Glass unveiled the title and shared the track listing of the album and announced an initial release date of 28 January 2022. The announcement was accompanied by the single "Baby Teeth", which had by a music video by Astra Zero and Lucas David.

On 8 December 2021, Glass premiered the single "Fair Game", which was accompanied by a music video directed by Bryan M. Ferguson.

On 28 January 2022, Glass released "Love Is Violence". The single was accompanied by a gory music video by Bryan M. Ferguson. The early 2000s-inspired video depicts two teenagers who sensually pull out each other's entrails. It was released to make up for the album's delay to February 16.

Upon the album's release on the 16 February 2022, Glass premiered a music video for "Everybody Else" directed by Astra Zero.

== Reception ==
Professional ratings
Aggregate scores
Source	Rating
AnyDecentMusic?	7.1/10
Metacritic	76/100
Review scores
Source	Rating
AllMusic	4/5 stars
Clash	7/10
DIY	3.5/5 stars
Exclaim!	8/10
The Guardian	3/5 stars
NME	4/5 stars
Pitchfork	6.9/10
Slant Magazine	3.5/5 stars

The album received generally positive reviews from critics. On Metacritic, it has a score of 76 out of 100, based on reviews from ten critics.

== Track listing ==
All tracks are written by Jupiter Keyes and Alice Glass, except where noted.

No.	Title	Writer(s)	Length
1.	"Prey"		2:20
2.	"Pinned Beneath Limbs"		1:56
3.	"Love is Violence"		2:37
4.	"Baby Teeth"		2:25
5.	"Everybody Else"	Glass; Keyes; Illangelo; Matt Radosevich	3:49
6.	"The Hunted"		2:46
7.	"Fair Game"		2:46
8.	"Witch Hunt"	Glass; Keyes; MØ	2:58
9.	"Suffer and Swallow"		2:53
10.	"Suffer in Peace"		1:48
11.	"Animosity"		2:50
12.	"I Trusted You"		2:29
13.	"Sorrow Ends"		1:00
Total length:			32:00

Notes

- All track titles are stylised in all caps.
