= Irene Gibbons =

Irene Gibbons can refer to:

- Irene Lenz (1900-62), American costume designer usually called Irene
- Eva Taylor (1895-1977), American singer (birth name)
