= Vanished (Crystal Castles song) =

2008 single by Crystal Castles

Single by Crystal Castles

from the album Crystal Castles
- Released: July 21, 2008
- Recorded: 2006
- Genre: Dark pop; electro; synth-pop; new rave
- Length: 4:02
- Label: Different, PIAS
- Songwriters: Ethan Kath, Van She
- Producer: Ethan Kath

Crystal Castles singles chronology
"Courtship Dating" (2008)	"Vanished" (2008)	"Celestica" (2010)

"Vanished" is a song by the Canadian duo Crystal Castles for their debut studio album, Crystal Castles (2008). It was released on July 21, 2008, through Different and PIAS as the album's fourth and final single. The song was composed and produced by member Ethan Kath, with vocals sampled from the song "Sex City" by Van She, who are credited as writers. "Vanished" has elements of dark pop, electro, disco, and nu-rave, and some critics felt it was lighter than other songs on the Crystal Castles album. An accompanying music video was released in November 2008.

== Background and composition ==
"Vanished" was recorded in 2006. It was composed and produced by the Crystal Castles member Ethan Kath. The song contains a sample of the vocal track and melody of Van She's "Sex City", used with permission; he is credited as a writer. It leans towards dark pop and has elements of electro, disco, and nu-rave. Mehan Jayasuriya of PopMatters described the song as "an echoey tunnel of fuzzed-out synths and bouncy, cartoonish tones", while Pitchfork's Molly Beauchemin said the song has "echoey, boomeranging, headphones [melodies]". Writing for The Skinny, Jason Morton described the "Atari beat" as "upbeat but not pounding". Heather Phares of AllMusic said that the "danceable gloom" of the track evidenced the "remarkable amount of melancholy" that "haunts" the band. Kath provides vocals for "Vanished", instead of the member Alice Glass as usual for the band; Alex Young of Consequence said this added variety on an album that mainly contained female vocals. Jayasuriya felt Kath's vocals were as indecipherable as Glass's. Morton described the vocals as "velvety".

== Release and reception ==
Crystal Castles released their debut studio album, Crystal Castles, on March 18, 2008, in the United States and on April 18 in the United Kingdom. "Vanished" was digitally released as the album's fourth and final single on July 21 through record labels Different and PIAS. In Europe, a promotional compact disc was released through Lies, Last Gang, Different, and PIAS. The duo recorded a music video for "Vanished" in April 2008 at the CiRCA superclub in downtown Toronto amidst their tour. However, a different video was released in November, recorded at the Union Pool in Brooklyn and directed by Derrick Beckles with the help of Vernon Chatman. It does not feature the duo. Allison Franks of Consequence said the video "carries some strong opinions about children's fame and the exploitation of younger generations". She described it as the duo's "strangest video yet" and as perfectly matching the song.

Tony Naylor of NME described "Vanished" as "just sensational, a weightless, sleekly designed electro-disco anthem". Writing for Hotpress, Paul Nolan said that the track evidenced that Crystal Castles "[knows] how to rustle up a killer groove in their own right", it being "brilliantly crafted" and "guaranteed to get any dancefloor moving". The Skinny's Jason Morton praised the song's dark pop vibe, but said "the lack of gusto may not sit well with fans of previous singles". He said it is "one of the most subdued songs" on the "raucous" album. Writing for the same magazine, Sean McNamara felt that "Vanished" was "drowned in the plain screechy nonsense" of other tracks. Mark Horne of The Bolton News described "Vanished" as a "lightweight release" and an "album-filler". He felt there were better tracks on the Crystal Castles album that could be released as singles instead. Slant Magazine's Dave Hughes described it as an "excellent remix" of Van She's "Sex City", which he compared negatively to. In 2014, Molly Beauchemin of Pitchfork named "Vanished" one of Crystal Castles' ten best songs, describing it as "a paradoxically dystopian message enveloped in palpating, nu-rave warmth".

== Track listing ==
Digital download
No.	Title	Length
1.	"Vanished" (radio edit)	2:58
2.	"Vanished" (Nasty Nav remix)	5:32
3.	"Tell Me What to Swallow" (beat demo)	2:14
4.	"Vanished" (album version)	4:02

Promotional compact disc
No.	Title	Length
1.	"Vanished" (radio edit)	2:58
2.	"Vanished" (album version)	4:02

== Personnel ==
Adapted from the CD liner notes of Crystal Castles and "Vanished".

- Ethan Kath – composer, producer
- Van She – writer
- Lexxx – mixer
- Paul Martin – photographer

== Certifications ==
Region	Certification	Certified units/sales
United Kingdom (BPI)	Silver	200,000^{‡}
^{‡} Sales+streaming figures based on certification alone.
