= Courtship Dating =

2008 single by Crystal Castles

Single by Crystal Castles

from the album Crystal Castles
- B-side: "Trash Hologram"
- Released: 21 April 2008
- Recorded: 2006
- Genre: Electropop, bitpop, experimental
- Length: 3:32
- Label: Different, PIAS, Last Gang
- Songwriters: Ethan Kath, Alice Glass
- Producer: Ethan Kath

Crystal Castles singles chronology
"Air War" (2007)	"Courtship Dating" (2008)	"Vanished" (2008)

Music video
- "Courtship Dating" on YouTube

"Courtship Dating" is a song by the Canadian duo Crystal Castles for their debut studio album, Crystal Castles (2008). It was released on 21 April 2008 through Different, PIAS, and Last Gang, as the third single from the album. It was ranked as one of the best songs of the year by multiple publications.

== Background and composition ==
"Courtship Dating" was recorded in 2006. It was written by Crystal Castles members Ethan Kath and Alice Glass, with Kath producing it. According to the Independent, the song "is about human taxidermy, the idea of preserving the beauty of a lover the way you would an animal".

== Release and reception ==
Crystal Castles released their debut studio album, Crystal Castles, on 18 March 2008 in the United States and on 28 April in the United Kingdom. "Courtship Dating" was digitally released as the album's third single on 21 April through Different, PIAS, and Last Gang. In the United Kingdom, it was released on vinyl through Lies, Last Gang, and Different. Both releases contain a demo, "Trash Hologram". An accompanying music video directed by Marc Pannozzo was released in April. According to Brandon Stosuy of Stereogum, it shows darkened footage of Alice Glass singing and "being angsty" with flashes of Ethan Kath "rocking it". In the United Kingdom, "Courtship Dating" peaked on the Official Charts Company's Independent Singles Chart at number 4 and their Physical Singles Chart at number 39.

NME described "Courtship Dating" it as "synth-pop filled up with muted screams, jerking bass and sparking circuit boards" and "the best piece of humanity-loathing cyborg pop since the Knife's Silent Shout".

"Courtship Dating" was named one of the best songs of 2008 by laut.de, NME, Pitchfork, and Slant Magazine, with the latter considering it one of the best tracks from the 2000–2009 period.

The song is believed to have been sampled in 50 Cent's Ayo Technology.

== Track listing ==
"Courtship Dating" track listing
No.	Title	Length
1.	"Courtship Dating"	3:32
2.	"Trash Hologram" (demo)	2:14

== Personnel ==
Adapted from the CD liner notes of "Crystal Castles" and the vinyl liner notes of "Courtship Dating".

- Alice Glass – writer (1)
- Ethan Kath – writer, producer (1, 2)
- Health – backing screams (1)
- Alex Bonenfant – additional vocal recording (1)
- Squeak E. Clean – vocal production (1)
- Lexxx – mixing (1)
- Graham Turner – photo

== Accolades ==
Accolades for "Courtship Dating"
Publication	List	Rank	Ref.
laut.de	2008 staff poll	22	
NME	Top 50 tracks of 2008	17	
Pitchfork	The 100 best tracks of 2008	60	
Slant Magazine	The 25 best albums & singles of 2008	19	
Slant Magazine	Best of the aughts (2000–2009)	205	

== Charts ==
Chart performance for "Courtship Dating"
Chart (2021)	Peak position
UK Independent Singles Chart (OCC)	4
UK Physical Singles Chart (OCC)	39
