= Stillbirth (disambiguation) =

A stillbirth is the death of a fetus before or during delivery, resulting in the delivery of a dead baby.

Stillbirth may also refer to:

- Stillbirth (album), by Oneiroid Psychosis, 1995
- "Stillbirth" (song), by Alice Glass, 2015

== See also ==
- Stillborn (disambiguation)
