= Crystal Castles (2008 album) =

Studio album by Crystal Castles

Studio album by Crystal Castles
- Released: March 18, 2008
- Recorded: 2004–2007
- Genres: Synth-punk; chiptune; noise; indie electronic
- Length: 51:55
- Labels: Lies; Last Gang
- Producers: Crystal Castles; Ethan Kath; Squeak E. Clean; Matthew Wagner

Crystal Castles chronology
Alice Practice (2006)	Crystal Castles (2008)	Crystal Castles (2010)

Singles from Crystal Castles
- 1. "Crimewave" Released: August 13, 2007; 2. "Air War" Released: December 17, 2007; 3. "Courtship Dating" Released: March 31, 2008; 4. "Vanished" Released: June 14, 2008

Crystal Castles, also known as Crystal Castles (I) or simply (I), is the debut studio album by Canadian electronic music duo Crystal Castles; at the time of its release, the group consisted of producer Ethan Kath and singer Alice Glass. The two met each other in 2004 and both had an interest in noise acts like AIDS Wolf & The Sick Lipstick. This inspired the two to start a noise music project, but instead of guitars, they claimed to use electronic sounds made with a circuit-bent Atari 5200–which effectively led to the media pigeonholing the act as chiptune, despite the fact that the members themselves didn't deliberately intend this.

Despite being labeled as the group's debut album, Crystal Castles is a compilation of singles that popularized the duo internationally, as well as unreleased demos recorded in 2004 along with two new songs: "Courtship Dating", and "Tell Me What to Swallow". The content on the LP includes samples of tracks from acts such as Death from Above 1979, Grandmaster Flash and the Furious Five, Luciano Berio, Drinking Electricity, and Van She. Some professional music journalists highlighted its random and unpredictable nature as well as its unique style and sound.

Crystal Castles was released on March 18, 2008, by Lies Records and Last Gang Records, and performed well commercially in the United States, allowing it to make its way onto Billboard charts such as Independent Albums, Top Dance/Electronic Albums, and Top Heatseekers. It also charted in Australia, France, Ireland, Scotland and the United Kingdom. Many professional critics had complimentary opinions towards the album, with the writer for Delusions of Adequacy calling it "one of the best electronic albums of the year". The record ranked in the top 20 on numerous year-end lists by publications such as Pitchfork, NME, and PopMatters and landed on lists of the best albums of the 2000s by NME and Complex. In 2013, Crystal Castles was placed at number 477 on NME's list of "The 500 Greatest Albums of All Time".

== Background and release ==
Ethan Kath and Alice Glass first met each other around 2004 while doing community service at a center for the blind. They were both interested in noise music and formed Crystal Castles to produce a new style of noise, replacing guitars with electronic keyboards and dance music elements. Kath gave Glass a CD of twenty-five instrumentals in the summer of that year, and Glass chose to record vocals for five of them. Crystal Castles includes some of these demo recordings that were previously unreleased. In 2005, British label Merok Records discovered Crystal Castles via an alleged mic check recording (Note: This story has since been denied by Alice Glass, who claimed that Ethan Kath fictionalised the story to minimise her input into the band.) titled "Alice Practice" that was uploaded to MySpace in 2005 and released an extended play of the same name by the duo in 2006. Following a set of sold-out 7-inches releases on other UK labels, Crystal Castles became popular on an international level.

The Montreal-based Last Gang Records issued Crystal Castles in North America on March 18, 2008, with an April 28 release in the United Kingdom. In order to prevent online leaking of the record, Last Gang did not issue any previews of it. However, an article published in Now in February 2008 reported of a fake version of the LP published around several file-sharing sites and garnering numerous downloads. This version was a set of demos recorded in 2004, while the actual LP consisted of content recorded from 2005 to 2007. According to Kath, "I originally gave Alice [Glass] a CD of 24 songs to choose from back when we first started, and some kid took 16 of them and put them up on the Internet as the album, and people have been reviewing it. I've actually read some very positive reviews for the 2004 demos."

== Production and composition ==
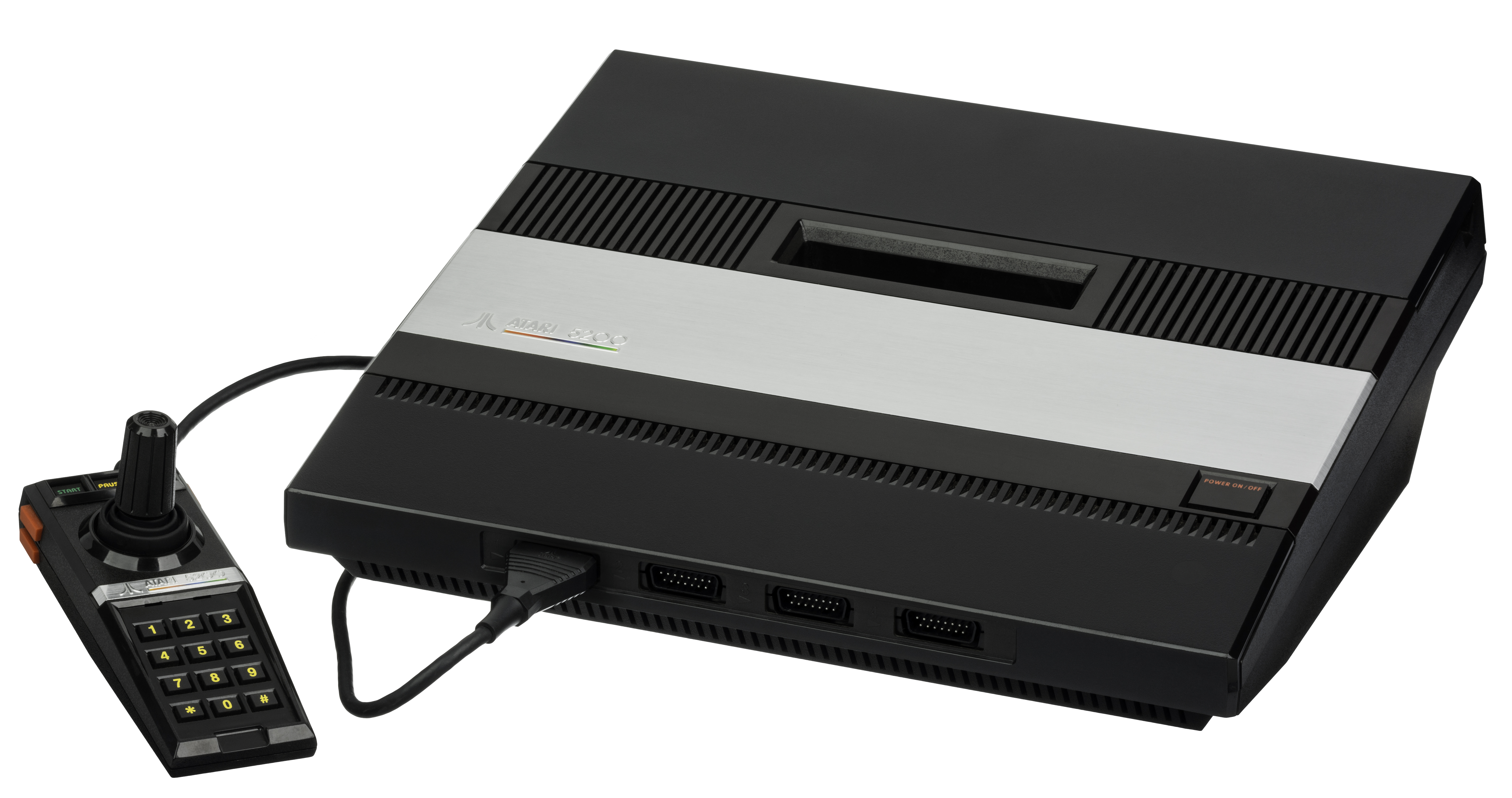
Kath claims to have produced the sounds on Crystal Castles by circuit bending an Atari 5200 console.

We both hate video games. We were just breaking apart electronics and toys to get annoying sounds. AIDS Wolf is going to annoy you with guitars; we're going to annoy you with the insides of old electronics.

— Ethan Kath on the electronic sound of Crystal Castles

Kath described their musical style as "AIDS Wolf get into a fight with New Order". In making their music, the duo mainly focused on how "abrasive" noise music was; as Glass explained, "annoying people still evokes an emotion in them. When you hear a bunch of crazy sounds you're gonna feel something." In analyzing how this relates the music that appears on their self-titled debut album, Edgar Smith of Time Out London wrote that the meaning of the tracks come from their "splintered melod[ies] and melancholic drum-loops" and not from their incomprehensible vocals and lyrics. Kath explained that in order for music to have "annoying" elements he created many of the sounds used on Crystal Castles by sampling textures produced from a circuit-bent Atari 5200 console. The use of these sounds led multiple journalists and bloggers to categorize the works of Crystal Castles under an 8-bit chiptune genre that the duo did not intend to be classified as; this categorization was further affected by the coincidence of Crystal Castles being also an arcade game from 1983 by Atari.

The 8-bit sounds are played over harsh, industrial music-style drums. Ian Cohen, a contributor for Pitchfork, analyzed that while the content on Crystal Castles spans multiple genres and types of structures, "the body of the album can be distilled to an essence of the glassy, ten-lane stare of Last Exit with Ed Banger's egg-frying EQ". A writer for Prefix magazine categorized it as a mix of mid-tempo melodic electronic dance songs and dark, noisy, and less accessible electro-punk. Writing for Resident Advisor, Stéphane Girard compared the DIY aspect of the album to the works of Scottish group Bis and American band Adult, while Entertainment Weekly's Youyoung Lee compared the album's sound to English electronic band Ladytron.

However, some reviewers highlighted Crystal Castles' style and sound as unique in comparison to most other electronic dance acts. Mehan Jayasuriya, writing for PopMatters, called it the "most iconoclastic and the most convincing" record of 2008's electro dance scene, reasoning that "their stripped-down, yet grimy aesthetic spits in the face of maximalist electro, offering a counterpoint to the polished, melodically overstated sound of Daft Punk and their progeny". Tiny Mix Tapes writer Cor Limey labeled the LP as "independent" from similar nostalgia-driven indie electronic music because of its elements of irony and self-awareness. He wrote that it "smash[es] all allusions to the Atari/cartoon generation of the '80s into their minute molecular parts and then piec[es] their electrum fragments into a bigger, newer, musical battlecat". A Drowned in Sound critic went as so far as to call the music "otherworldly" and "almost new-worldly" and compared it to the works of My Bloody Valentine, The Velvet Underground, and Sonic Youth in that the band explores unconventional sounds and turns them into pop.

Throughout Crystal Castles, all elements of the music's structure constantly change in moments unforeseeable by the listener; this includes the amount of chaos, noise, melodic elements, energy, and atmosphere in the tracks, with Daiana Feuer from URB labeling the instrumentals as a "mix of tragedy and uppity beat munching". Cohen noted that this unpredictable aspect was especially true in the LP's last two tracks, "Black Panther" and "Tell Me What to Swallow", the latter of which he called a "disquietingly beautiful shoegaze comedown". Despite this, however, Girard analyzed the album still "sounds immensely coherent, even when it is not at all".

The random element of Crystal Castles also applies to Glass's vocal performances where, in the words of AllMusic journalist Heather Phares, it can be "terrifying on one track and kittenish on another". Ginger King of Consequence of Sound compared Glass to Karen O, Jemina Pearl, or Glass Candy singer Ida No but also wrote that "the difference is Alice Glass somehow gives less of a fuck". Limey described Glass's vocal performance as "violent", "sometimes morose", and other times "lilting like a Valley girl", while Spin magazine's Mosi Reeves labeled it as "sarcastic". The vocals are heavily altered digitally, and Prefix noted them to have a "fragility" unusual in most electronic dance music.

== Content ==
Crystal Castles is a compilation of the band's previous sold-out singles, early unreleased tracks and three new songs recorded for the album. New tracks on the LP include "Through the Hosiery", "Reckless", and the album's closing track "Tell Me What to Swallow", a ballad that consists of an acoustic guitar and 40 vocal layers sung by Glass.

The album's opener "Untrust Us" uses vocals from Death from Above 1979's "Dead Womb". The vocals are "disembodied and chopped up" and are performed over a "cyclical synth loop", wrote Pitchfork contributor Ian Cohen. The vocals are edited in a way that "could very well be confused for gibberish or Japanese", analyzed King. The electroclash-style "Courtship Dating" includes Three 6 Mafia-esque percussion click sounds, what Cohen described as "fizzy synths" and a "call-and-response chant". Phares described Glass' singing on the track as like a "spaced-out valley girl".

"Alice Practice" was claimed to be a mic check recording that Merok chose as Crystal Castles' first single. Journalist John Brainlove categorized it as a "hit and run electropop" song that includes "flailing, pulsing beeps smashed over an evil beat and driven onward by an incomprehensible shrieked vocal". Cohen labeled "Good Time" a "veritable toybox with undulating octaves, an almost Eastern-sounding riff and tweaked nice-guy vocals which combine the Knife and New Order". As Phares wrote, "Xxzxcuzx Me" depicts Glass sounding like an android with her voice "degrad[ing] into pixels almost as soon as she opens her mouth." King notes that it is "similar to 'Alice Practice' in style and product, but shorter and a bit more aggressive". "Crimewave", another electroclash-infused track, is a collaboration with American noise group HEALTH that includes a set of rattling drum sounds. "Magic Spells" starts with a set of incoherent sounds that, in the words of King, "gently transition into James Murphy style smoothness". Distorted singing then comes in near the end of the song.

== Critical reception ==
Professional ratings
Aggregate scores
Source	Rating
Metacritic	73/100
Review scores
Source	Rating
AllMusic	4/5 stars
Robert Christgau	(2-star Honorable Mention)
Consequence of Sound	5/5 stars
Entertainment Weekly	B
The Guardian	2/5 stars
NME	8/10
Pitchfork	7.8/10
PopMatters	7/10
Slant Magazine	3/5 stars
Spin	3.5/5 stars

According to review aggregator Metacritic, Crystal Castles received "generally favorable reviews" from critics, with an average rating of 73 out of 100 based on 22 reviews. Bryan Sanchez of Delusions of Adequacy called it "one of the best electronic albums of the year", highlighting how it was "stylishly sequenced", where "change of paces happen and come in at just the right times". Some critics praised the LP's unpredictable nature; AllMusic journalist Heather Phares described the album as "fresher, more complex, and much less gimmicky than might be expected, especially for those familiar with only the band's singles" and a "familiar-sounding, edgy, innocent, menacing, bold, nuanced, and altogether striking debut". Consequence of Sound's King praised the album for its "high energy" and "pure originality". Tony Naylor, writing for NME, noted feeling "intrigued and awestruck" after listening to the record and opined that "you will hear nothing better this year than" the tracks "Untrust Us", "Crimewave", "Air War", and "Vanished".

A critic for Prefix called Crystal Castles "an electro record that challenges, succeeding and failing all at once, and perhaps most important, never forgetting the primary goal of dance music". He stated that in spite of its random amounts of moods and genres, the listener can still "truly enter the artists' world", and the record "never feel[s] out of step or over the players' heads". A reviewer for Drowned in Sound stated that "what makes Crystal Castles so thrilling is that [the duo] turn the fruits of [the availability of technology] into weapons to use against it, using [it] to cut through the shitty mire". He praised it as "a crystal castle of technological rubbish fusing together under the harsh gaze of a falling sun, Kath and Glass digging around in the molten plastic for things to bang together, new-age Stigs dreaming of leisure's lost golden age in a data dump".

Crystal Castles also had a few mixed critical opinions. Paul Nolan from Hot Press felt that the more noise-induced, less pop-music-orientated songs of the LP were its weakest tracks. Dorian Lynskey of The Guardian summarized that the record is "all manic with youthful enthusiasm but unsatisfyingly feels half-finished, as if Crystal Castles are still struggling to mould these wonderful sounds into something coherent". In a piece for The Skinny, Sean McNamara opined that most of the album's content was "static, ZX Spectrum computer style melodies and sheer noise-a-rama", which was disappointing given that songs like "Crimewave", "Magic Spells", and "1991" show "real evidence that when they calm down a bit they can produce some high quality electro that is a delight to hear".

In Dave Hughes' review of Crystal Castles for Slant Magazine, he noted three types of songs on the record that he marked as "Wii", "Xbox", and "Huffing Paint Thinner". "Wii" tracks, which include "1991" and "Black Panther", are "stupid, simplistic, and incredibly fun" and have "ping-ponging keyboard melodies and stray laser beam noises" foreground in the mix with vocals that work as "atmospheric background mumbles". "Xbox" songs, such as "Untrust Us" and "Magic Spells", feature complex concepts, and Hughes opined that while these types of tracks were "accomplished", they didn't have a "killer app". "Huffing Paint Thinner" was labeled by Hughes as the worst type of tracks on the LP; he wrote that songs in this category such as "Alice Practice" "make one nostalgic for the soothing sounds of Atari Teenage Riot" and are "quite irritating and certainly not good for one's brain cells — even if you're the type who enjoys the ranty screams of lead singers who cannot, strictly, sing". He summarized that while the rest of the album offers "cheap-sounding and eccentric but still rather charming variations on punky dance-pop", its more rock-oriented moments are presented in a way that makes them "arty by being as annoying as possible".

== Commercial performance ==
As of April 2010, sales in the United States have exceeded 72,000 copies, according to Nielsen SoundScan. As of September 2014, it was certified Silver for 60,000 copies sold in the UK by British Phonographic Industry.

== Accolades ==
Publication	List	Rank
Complex	The 100 Best Albums of The Complex Decade	76
Consequence of Sound	The Top 100 Albums (2008)	25
Drowned in Sound	50 Albums of 2008	15
NME	Top 50 Albums of 2008	12
NME	50 Greatest Debut Albums	Unranked
NME	The Top 100 Greatest Albums of the Decade	39
NME	"The 500 Greatest Albums of All Time"	477
Pitchfork	The 50 Best Albums of 2008	15
PopMatters	The Best Albums of 2008	17

== Track listing ==
No.	Title	Writer(s)	Producer(s)	Length
1.	"Untrust Us"	Ethan Kath; Death from Above 1979	Kath	3:06
2.	"Alice Practice"	Kath; Alice Glass	Kath; Matthew Wagner^{[a]}	2:42
3.	"Crimewave" (Crystal Castles vs. Health)	Kath; Health	Kath	4:18
4.	"Magic Spells"	Kath	Kath	6:07
5.	"Xxzxcuzx Me"	Kath; Glass	Kath; Crystal Castles^{[a]}; Wagner^{[a]}	1:54
6.	"Air War"	Kath	Kath	4:12
7.	"Courtship Dating"	Kath; Glass	Kath^{[b]}; Squeak E. Clean^{[a]}	3:30
8.	"Good Time"	Kath; Drinking Electricity	Kath	2:56
9.	"1991"	Kath	Kath	1:53
10.	"Vanished"	Kath; Van She	Kath	4:02
11.	"Knights"	Kath	Kath	3:13
12.	"Love and Caring"	Kath; Glass	Kath; Crystal Castles^{[a]}; Wagner^{[a]}	2:18
13.	"Through the Hosiery"	Kath; Glass	Kath; Squeak E. Clean^{[a]}; Crystal Castles^{[a]}	3:07
14.	"Reckless"	Kath	Kath	3:28
15.	"Black Panther"	Kath; Glass	Kath^{[b]}; Squeak E. Clean^{[a]}	2:56
16.	"Tell Me What to Swallow"	Kath; Glass	Kath	2:14

Japanese edition bonus tracks
No.	Title	Length
17.	"Trash Hologram"	2:17
18.	"Air War" (David Wolf remix)	3:21

Notes

- ^{^a} signifies a vocal producer
- ^{^b} signifies a main and vocal producer

Sample credits

- "Untrust Us" contains a sample of "Dead Womb" by Death from Above 1979.
- "Magic Spells" contains a sample of "The Message" by Grandmaster Flash and the Furious Five.
- "Air War" contains a sample of "Thema (Omaggio a Joyce)" by Luciano Berio.
- "Good Time" contains a sample of "Good Times" (Dance Mix) by Drinking Electricity.
- "Vanished" contains a sample of the vocal track and melody of "Sex City" by Van She.

== Personnel ==
Credits adapted from the liner notes of Crystal Castles.

Crystal Castles

- Crystal Castles – vocal production (tracks 5, 12, 13)
- Ethan Kath – production (all tracks); mixing (tracks 3, 6, 16); vocal production (tracks 7, 13)
- Alice Glass – vocals

Additional personnel

- Health – backing screams (track 7)
- Alex Bonenfant – additional vocal recording (track 7); mixing (track 11); recording (track 16)
- Matthew Wagner – vocal recording (track 2); vocal production (tracks 5, 12)
- Squeak E. Clean – vocal production (tracks 7, 13, 15)
- Lexxx – mixing (tracks 1, 4, 7–10, 13–15)
- Lazar Nesic – mixing (tracks 3, 6)
- Nils – mastering
- Stuart Pillinger – cover photo
- Mikey Apples – layout

== Charts ==
=== Weekly charts ===
Chart (2008)	Peak position
Australian Dance Albums (ARIA)	23
French Albums (SNEP)	175
Irish Albums (IRMA)	49
Scottish Albums (Official Charts)	62
UK Albums (Official Charts)	47
UK Independent Albums (Official Charts)	3
US Independent Albums (Billboard)	32
US Top Dance Albums (Billboard)	6
US Heatseekers Albums (Billboard)	3

=== Year-end charts ===
Chart (2008)	Rank
US Dance/Electronic Albums (Billboard)	24

== Certifications ==
Certifications for Crystal Castles
Region	Certification	Certified units/sales
United Kingdom (BPI)	Silver	60,000^{*}
^{*} Sales figures based on certification alone.
