= Cease and Desist (song) =

Single by Alice Glass
- Released: 23 January 2018
- Genre: Electropunk; noise pop
- Length: 1:54
- Label: Loma Vista
- Songwriters: Alice Glass; Luwayne Glass; Jupiter Hoover-Keyes
- Producers: Dreamcrusher; Jupiter Keyes

Alice Glass singles chronology
"Forgiveness" (2018)	"Cease and Desist" (2018)	"Mine" (2018)

Music video
- "Cease and Desist" on YouTube

"Cease and Desist" is a song by Canadian singer-songwriter Alice Glass, released on 23 January 2018 through Loma Vista. The song was written by Glass, Jupiter Keyes and Luwayne Glass, and produced by Keyes and Dreamcrusher.

== Release ==
"Cease and Desist" was released on 23 January 2018 through Loma Vista Recordings, and is the first new material Glass released since her eponymous debut EP (2017). The track came after former bandmate Ethan Kath denied allegations of sexual misconduct made by Glass, and confirmed that he was seeking legal action against her. In a press release, Glass stated:

This song is a call to arms for all survivors. But being a survivor often means feeling afraid, it means sometimes feeling worthless, like you can’t go on. We need to fight back against those who have victimized us and against the feelings that tell us to give up inside. Sometimes we think we deserve the pain others have inflicted on us. This song is what I need to tell myself to get through each day, and what I hope other survivors can remember when they feel like they can't make it through the darkness of their own recovery. Every day is a fight.

== Composition ==
"Cease and Desist" clocks in at less than two minutes and features writing and production contributions from former Health member Jupiter Keyes and noisecore producer Dreamcrusher. The song consists of a corrosive industrial beat and Glass' "unchained vocals". Noisey said the track is "like only Glass can make it: fast, sort-of-sparse, brittle-feeling, but tough at its core. Glass' vocals are a frantic cry, and a refusal to be downtrodden: "Honestly, you're never the victim" her lyrics implore, offering a balm for her own wounds, but also for those of others too." Consequence of Sound called the song "a tight, furious burst of catharsis." Dazed characterized it as an "electro-punk thrasher". Paste described the song as an "abrasive, dirty noise-pop track." Stereogum called it "a staticky noise blast." Spin noted the song's "shrieking vocals and harsh, distorted synths, along with lyrics that inspire resilience."

== Music video ==
The release of "Cease and Desist" was accompanied by a music video directed by Lindsey Nico Mann and Dan Streit. The video features colorized and pixelated images of various live footage of Glass mixed in with shots of vintage animation, security footage, cats and rabbits, and more.

== Personnel ==
- Alice Glass – vocals
- Jupiter Keyes – production, artwork design
- Dreamcrusher – production
- Ryan Kaul – mixing
- Lucas David – photography
