= Without Love =

Without Love may refer to:

== Music ==
=== Albums ===
- Without Love (Black 'n Blue album)
- Without Love, an album by Tinga Stewart

=== Songs ===
- "Without Love" (Alice Glass song)
- "Without Love" (Hairspray song)
- "Without Love" (Nick Lowe song), a 1979 song by Nick Lowe from the album Labour of Lust, covered in 1980 by Johnny Cash
- "Without Love" (Clyde McPhatter song) (1957), covered by Little Richard, Ray Charles, Tom Jones
- "Without Love", a 1986 song by Bon Jovi, found on Slippery When Wet
- "Without Love", a 1973 song by Katja Ebstein
- "Without Love", a 1974 song by Aretha Franklin
- "Without Love", a 2011 song by Sara Groves from the album Invisible Empires
- "Without Love", a 2024 song by Paris Hilton from the album Infinite Icon
- "Without Love", a 1996 song by Donna Lewis from the album Now in a Minute
- "Without Love", a 2016 song by the Descendents from the album Hypercaffium Spazzinate
- "Long Train Runnin'", a 1973 song by the Doobie Brothers that prominently features the words "without love" in the chorus

== Other uses ==
- Without Love (film), a 1942 play by Philip Barry adapted to a 1945 film with Spencer Tracy and Katharine Hepburn
- "Without Love", a 1913 poem by Galaktion Tabidze
