= Alice Practice =

EP by Crystal Castles
- Released: July 9, 2006
- Recorded: 2005–2006
- Genres: Electropunk, experimental, chiptune
- Length: 8:37
- Label: Merok Records

Crystal Castles chronology
| Alice Practice (2006) | Crystal Castles (2008) |

Professional ratings
Review scores
| Source | Rating |
|---|---|
| Drowned in Sound | 9/10 stars |

Alice Practice is the debut extended play (EP) by the Canadian electronic music duo Crystal Castles. It was released on July 9, 2006, through Merok Records. The release was limited to 500 copies on 7" vinyl and sold out in three days.

The cover of the EP features artwork by Trevor Brown of Madonna with a black eye. Brown sued the band, claiming that they had used his work without permission. In 2008, Brown and the band came to a settlement in which he was paid for the rights to the image.

The title track, "Alice Practice", was claimed to be a soundcheck secretly recorded by the sound engineer before the band launched into a five-song recording session in 2005. This story has since been denied by Alice Glass, who claimed that Ethan Kath fictionalised the story to minimise her input into the band. Crystal Castles later performed "Alice Practice" on an episode of the British television series Skins. After being featured on the show, demand for the Alice Practice EP grew rapidly. In October 2011, NME rated the song number 29 on its list of "150 Best Tracks of the Past 15 Years".

The track "Air War" garnered attention from prominent indie website Pitchfork Media. The track "Dolls" is exclusive to the Alice Practice EP and is not available on any other official release.

== Track listing ==
1. "Alice Practice" – 2:16
2. "Dolls" – 1:33
3. "Air War" – 2:28
4. "Love and Caring" – 2:20

== See also ==
- List of controversial album art
