= Stillborn (disambiguation) =

A stillborn is a baby born without signs of life.

Stillborn may also refer to:

- Stillborn (album), by Malevolent Creation, 1993
- Stillborn (band), a Polish heavy metal band
- "Stillborn" (song), by Black Label Society, 2003

== Other uses ==
- Still/Born, 2017 film

== See also ==
- Stillbirth (disambiguation)
