= Forgiveness (Alice Glass song) =

2018 song performed by Alice Glass

Single by Alice Glass

from the EP Alice Glass
- Released: 11 January 2018
- Genre: Industrial pop; dark pop; electropop; dance-pop; futurepop; dark wave
- Length: 3:11
- Label: Loma Vista
- Songwriters: Alice Glass; Jupiter Hoover-Keyes; Atticus Ross
- Producers: Jupiter Hoover-Keyes; Matt Rad

Alice Glass singles chronology
"Without Love" (2017)	"Forgiveness" (2018)	"Cease and Desist" (2018)

Music video
- "Forgiveness" on YouTube

"Forgiveness" is a song by Canadian singer-songwriter Alice Glass. It was written by Glass, Jupiter Keyes and Atticus Ross, with production handled by Keyes and Matt Rad. The song was released on 11 January 2018 as the second single from Glass' eponymous debut EP, Alice Glass (2017).

== Composition ==
According to Alex Robert Ross of Noisey, "Forgiveness" is "a palpitating bit of dark-pop, full of claustrophobic lyrics, built on this line: "Four walls holding me / Cold eyes haunting me."" He later noted, "It's difficult not to read that as a chunk of autobiography and a comment on Ethan Kath, whom Glass has accused of a pattern of sexual, physical, and emotional abuse towards her while the two were in Crystal Castles." Dazed described the song as "an industrial-pop thumper driven by a chugging electronic bassline." Glass stated that the song is about "rejecting the idea of forgiveness," continuing: "Forgiveness isn't always a moral act, the way some religions portray it. Sometimes forgiveness can be exploitative or even predatory, especially when people use it as a means to guilt someone rather than heal them. When forgiveness is used to create a false sense of superiority it is a toxic act."

== Music video ==
The music video for "Forgiveness" was directed by Lindsey Mann. It is a dark, lo-fi video in which Glass writes the lyrics to the song in lipstick across various mirrors, before smudging the words at the end. Those scenes are interspersed with footage of her playing live with her band, and being mostly submerged in a pool of water. Glass said the video was shot at her house, and that "it was originally just going to be a lyrics video with me writing in lipstick on mirrors but then we drank too much tequila and filmed more fun stuff."
