= Mine (Alice Glass song) =

Single by Alice Glass
- Released: 15 June 2018
- Genre: Gothic pop
- Length: 3:04
- Label: Loma Vista
- Songwriter(s): Alice Glass; Jupiter Hoover-Keyes; Matt Rad
- Producer(s): Jupiter Keyes; Matt Rad

Alice Glass singles chronology
"Cease and Desist" (2018)	"Mine" (2018)	"I Trusted You" (2018)

Music video
- "Mine" on YouTube

"Mine" is a song by Canadian singer-songwriter Alice Glass, released on 15 June 2018, through Loma Vista. The song was written by Glass, Jupiter Keyes and Matt Rad, and produced by the latter two.

== Release ==
Glass announced the release of "Mine" on 5 June, ten days prior to the release of the song. In the announcement, she stated that an exclusive viewing party of the video would be held on 12 June at Faultline Bar in Los Angeles, which included DJ sets by her, Lulo, Matt Pernicano and Danny Lethal, as well as drag lip sync performances of Glass' eponymous debut EP (2017). "Mine" was premiered on Triple J on 14 June, a day prior to its release. In a press release, Glass stated that the song is about "someone who hurts themselves in an attempt to regain control of their own life and experiences. It's a form of self-sacrifice and also an act of personal freedom for someone who feels completely out of control. I do not condone self-harm, but like a lot of my music, "Mine" is about my struggle with coming out of an intensely abusive relationship. In the ritual of hurting myself or taking something from myself I am at the very least in control of that act, when in so many other aspects of my life I felt hopeless."

== Composition ==
Writing for The Guardian, Laura Snapes stated, "None of Glass's solo material has been an easy listen – eerie melodies snake around blasts of digital static – but "Mine" is a profoundly heavy listen, describing self-harm: "Abuse myself till I’m finally mine," she sings. "That's how desperate I felt," she says now." Anna Gaca of Spin said the song "is a unflinching look at turning to self-harm as a coping strategy, an experience Glass evokes with spacey goth-pop and an aching topline that soars above the song's murkier rhythmic elements with startling clarity." Consequence of Sound's Allison Shoemaker said the song is "a haunting track, a perfect backdrop for Glass's lilting, almost otherworldly voice, and the video is similarly affecting."

== Music video ==
The music video for "Mine" was premiered on 12 June at an exclusive viewing party in Los Angeles, and was officially released on 15 June. The video was directed by frequent collaborator Lucas David, marking his debut as a director, and stars American drag queen Violet Chachki. The video explores self-harm in a gothic, stylised setting.

== Personnel ==
- Alice Glass – vocals
- Jupiter Keyes – production
- Matt Rad – production
- Ryan Kaul – mixing
- Lynch Cassidy – artwork
