= Irene (costume designer) =

American fashion designer (1901–1962)

Irene Lentz
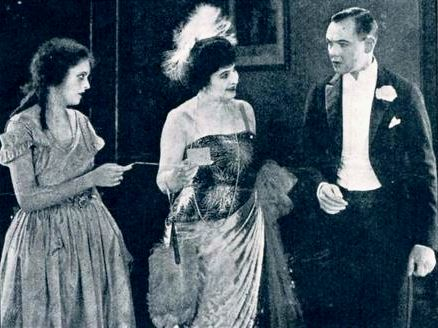
- Irene Lentz, Edythe Chapman, and Charles Ray in A Tailor-Made Man (1922)
- Born: December 8, 1901; Baker, Montana, U.S.
- Died: November 15, 1962 (aged 60); Los Angeles, California, U.S.
- Resting place: Forest Lawn Memorial Park
- Other name: Irene Gibbons
- Occupations: Costume designer, fashion designer, actress
- Known for: Designing costumes for motion picture actors
- Label: Irene Inc.
- Spouse(s): F. Richard Jones; Eliot Gibbons

Irene Maud Lentz (December 8, 1901 – November 15, 1962), also known mononymously and professionally as Irene, was an American actress turned fashion designer and costume designer. Her work as a clothing designer in Los Angeles led to her career as a costume designer for films in the 1930s. Lentz also worked under the name Irene Gibbons.

== Early life ==
Born in Baker, Montana to Emil Lents and Maud Walters, Lentz started out as an actress under her birth name, appearing in secondary roles in silent films beginning with Mack Sennett in 1921. She played ingénue parts opposite Sennett's leading comedians, Ben Turpin and Billy Bevan. Lentz was directed in her first film by Sennett's production chief, F. Richard Jones; their professional relationship matured into a personal one. They had been married for less than a year when Jones succumbed to tuberculosis in 1930.

== Design career ==
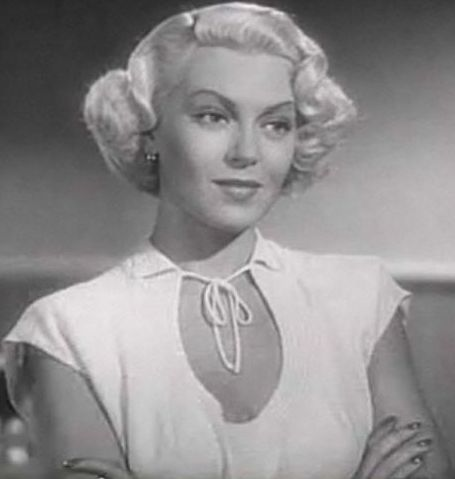
Lana Turner in The Postman Always Rings Twice (1946)

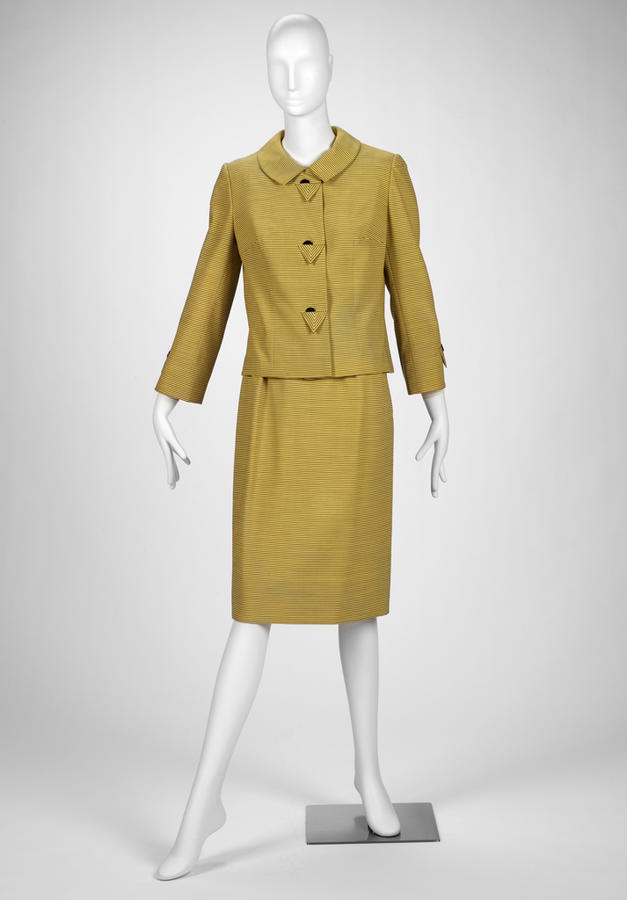
1959 Irene skirt suit, striped wool and silk (RISD Museum)

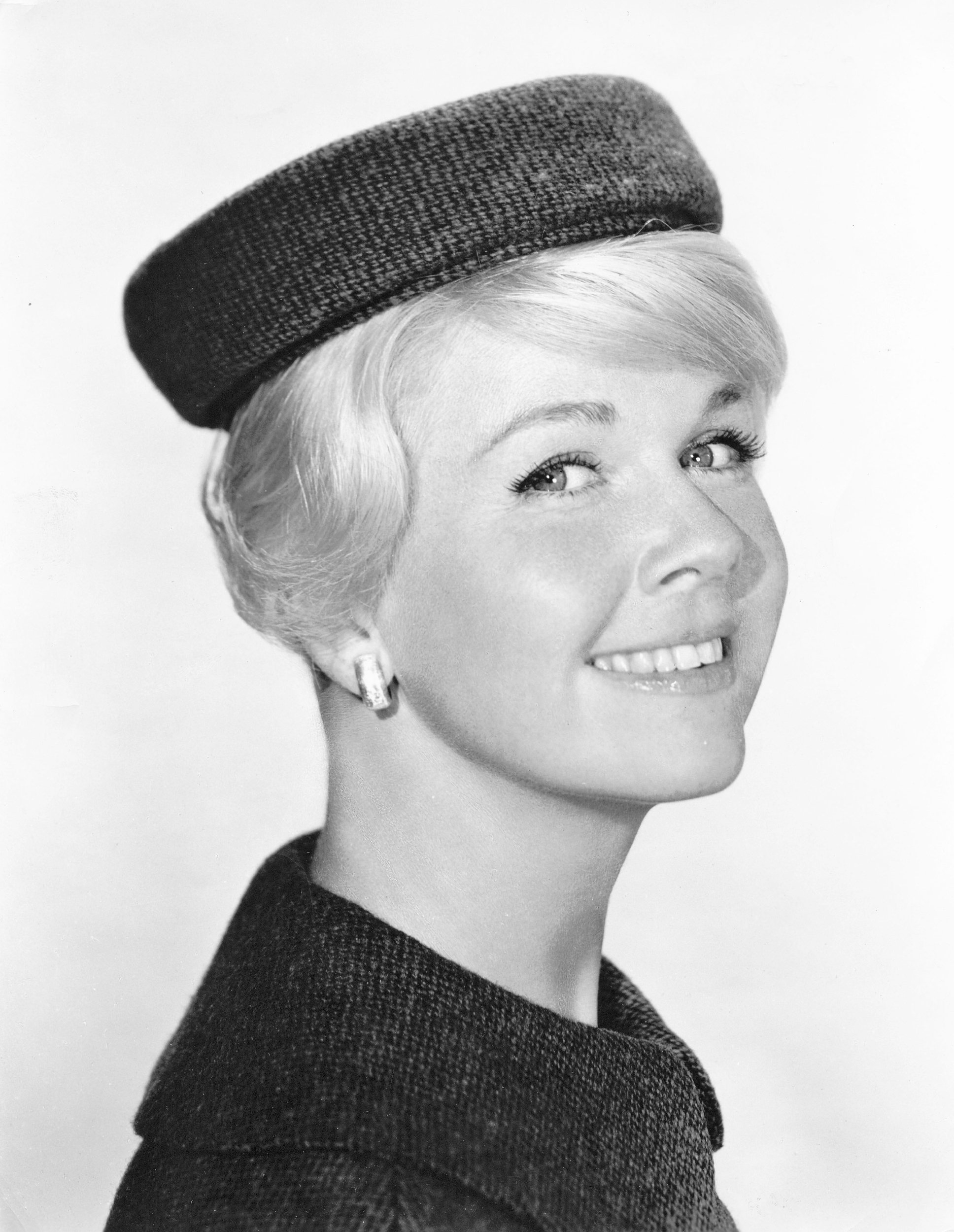
Doris Day in Midnight Lace (1960)

Lentz had been taught sewing as a child and with a flair for style, she decided to open a small dress shop. The success of her designs in her tiny store eventually led to an offer from the Bullocks Wilshire luxury department store to design for their Ladies Custom Salon which catered to a wealthy clientele including a number of Hollywood stars.

Lentz's designs at Bullocks gained her much attention in the film community and she was contracted by independent production companies to design the wardrobe for some of their productions. Billing herself simply as "Irene", her first work came in 1933 on the film Goldie Gets Along, featuring her designs for star Lili Damita. In the 1936 Mae West vehicle Go West, Young Man she was credited as Irene Jones. However, her big break came when she was hired to create the gowns for Ginger Rogers for her 1937 film Shall We Dance with Fred Astaire. This was followed by more designs in another Ginger Rogers film as well as work for other independents such as Walter Wanger Productions, Hal Roach Studios as well as majors such as RKO, Paramount Pictures and Columbia Pictures. During the 1930s, Irene Lentz designed the film wardrobe for leading ladies such as Constance Bennett, Hedy Lamarr, Joan Bennett, Claudette Colbert, Carole Lombard, Ingrid Bergman, and Loretta Young among others. She "is generally regarded as the originator of the dressmaker suit" that was popular in the late 1930s.

Through her work, Lentz met and married short story author and screenwriter Eliot Gibbons, brother of multi-Academy Award winning Cedric Gibbons, head of art direction at MGM Studios. Despite her success, working under the set designer Cedric while being married to his brother Eliot was not easy. Irene confided to her close friend Doris Day that the marriage to Eliot was not a happy one. (Note: In Doris Day's autobiography, she wrote that in 1962, Irene "had an unhappy marriage to a man who lived out of the state and only occasionally came to visit her.") Generally regarded as the most important and influential production designer in the history of American films, Cedric Gibbons hired Lentz when gown designer Adrian left MGM in 1941 to open his own fashion house. By 1943 she was a leading costume supervisor at MGM, earning international recognition for her "soufflé creations" and is remembered for her avant-garde wardrobe for Lana Turner in The Postman Always Rings Twice (1946).

In 1950, Lentz left MGM to open her own fashion house. Although Lentz had been out of the film industry for nearly ten years, Doris Day requested her services for the production Midnight Lace (Universal, 1960). The following year she did the costume design for another Day film, Lover Come Back (1961), and during 1962 worked on her last production, A Gathering of Eagles (released in 1963).

In 1962, after Doris Day noticed that Lentz seemed upset and nervous, Lentz confided in her that she was in love with actor Gary Cooper and that he was the only man that she had ever loved. (Note: Day also wrote that she got the feeling that she was the first person to whom Irene had confided this information about Gary Cooper. "Thinking about it now, I cannot honestly say whether Irene's love was one-sided or whether she and Cooper had actually had or were having an affair.") Cooper had died in 1961.

== Awards and nominations ==
- Nomination for the Academy Award for Best Costume Design, Black-and-White for B.F.'s Daughter (1948)
- Nomination for the Academy Award for Best Costume Design, Color for Midnight Lace (1960)

== Death ==
On November 15, 1962, three weeks before her sixty-first birthday, Lentz took room 1129 at the Knickerbocker Hotel, Los Angeles, checking in under an assumed name. She jumped to her death from her bathroom window.

She had left suicide notes for friends and family, for her ailing husband, and for the hotel residents, apologizing for any inconvenience her death might cause. Per her wishes, she is interred next to her first husband, director F. Richard Jones, at the Forest Lawn Memorial Park Cemetery in Glendale, California.

== Legacy ==
In 2005, Irene Lentz was inducted into the Costume Designers Guild's Anne Cole Hall of Fame.

== Selected filmography ==
Year	Title	Notes
1933	Goldie Gets Along	Costume designer, uncredited
1933	Flying Down to Rio	Costume designer, uncredited
1936	Go West, Young Man	Gowns for Mae West, credited as Irene Jones
1937	Shall We Dance	Gowns for Ginger Rogers
1937	Vogues of 1938	Gowns for Joan Bennett
1938	You Can't Take It With You	Gowns for Jean Arthur
1938	Topper Takes a Trip	Gowns for Constance Bennett
1938	Vivacious Lady	Gowns for Ginger Rogers
1939	In Name Only	Gowns for Carole Lombard
1939	Intermezzo: A Love Story	Costume designer for Ingrid Bergman
1939	Midnight	Gowns for Claudette Colbert
1940	Green Hell	Gowns for Joan Bennett
1940	Rebecca	Costume designer, uncredited
1940	Waterloo Bridge	Gowns for Vivien Leigh, uncredited (with Adrian)
1940	Seven Sinners	Gowns for Marlene Dietrich
1940	This Thing Called Love	Gowns for Rosalind Russell
1941	That Uncertain Feeling	Gowns for Merle Oberon
1941	Mr. & Mrs. Smith	Gowns for Carole Lombard
1941	To Be or Not to Be	Gowns for Carole Lombard
1942	Take a Letter, Darling	Gowns for Rosalind Russell
1942	You Were Never Lovelier	Gowns for Rita Hayworth
1942	The Palm Beach Story	Costume designer
1943	No Time for Love	Gowns for Claudette Colbert
1943	Girl Crazy	Costume supervisor
1943	The Youngest Profession	Costume supervisor
1944	Gaslight	Costume designer
1944	Meet Me in St. Louis	Costume supervisor
1944	Bathing Beauty	Costume supervisor
1945	The Picture of Dorian Gray	Costume supervisor
1945	Week-End at the Waldorf	Costume supervisor
1945	Without Love	Costume supervisor
1946	The Harvey Girls	Costume supervisor
1946	Ziegfeld Follies	Costume designer/supervisor, uncredited
1947	Lady in the Lake	Costume supervisor
1947	Cynthia	Costume designer
1947	Cass Timberlane	Costume designer
1948	Easter Parade	Costume designer (women)
1948	The Pirate	Costume supervisor
1949	The Barkleys of Broadway	Costume designer
1949	Neptune's Daughter	Costume designer
1950	Shadow on the Wall	Costume designer
1960	Midnight Lace	Gowns for Doris Day
1961	Lover Come Back	Gowns for Doris Day
1963	A Gathering of Eagles	Costume designer
