= Air War =

Single by Crystal Castles

from the album Crystal Castles
- B-side: "XxzxcuZx Me"
- Released: 17 December 2007
- Genre: Electronic, chiptune, experimental
- Length: 4:06
- Label: Trouble Records, So Sweet Records
- Songwriter: Ethan Kath
- Producer: Ethan Kath

Crystal Castles singles chronology
"Crimewave" (2007)	"Air War" (2007)	"Courtship Dating" (2008)

"Air War" is a single by Crystal Castles. It was released on 17 December 2007 by Trouble Records as a 7" vinyl. An earlier version of the song was released in July 2006 as the B-Side to "Alice Practice" on Merok Records. The lyrics are from the 1922 James Joyce novel Ulysses in Chapter 11: Sirens. The cover art gathered public interest because of the odd picture of Ethan Kath and Alice Glass with ice cream cones as heads.

The song was used as the advertisement soundtrack of "Toshiba Product Technology: Time Sculpture". The one-minute-long video was directed by Mitch Stratten. The video shows an empty room that features people making repeated movements. The advertisement was released to promote Toshiba's high-definition television upscaling technology in the United Kingdom.

The song was featured on the UEFA Euro 2008 video game.

== Music video ==
The music video was cancelled from being released. Made in 2006, the producer threw out the video due to its cover art leaking onto the Internet. The video shows Kath and Glass walking in the street with ice cream cone heads and giving people melting ice cream. It ends with Ethan and Alice entering an interdimensional portal and turning into ice cream cones. The video features a demo version of the song "Air War".

== Track listing ==
=== 7": Trouble UK ===
No.	Title	Length
1.	"Air War"	4:06
2.	"Air War (David Wolf Remix)"	3:16

=== CD: So Sweet UK ===
No.	Title	Length
1.	"Air War"	4:06
2.	"XxzxcuZx Me"	1:53
