= Astra Zero =

Canadian artist

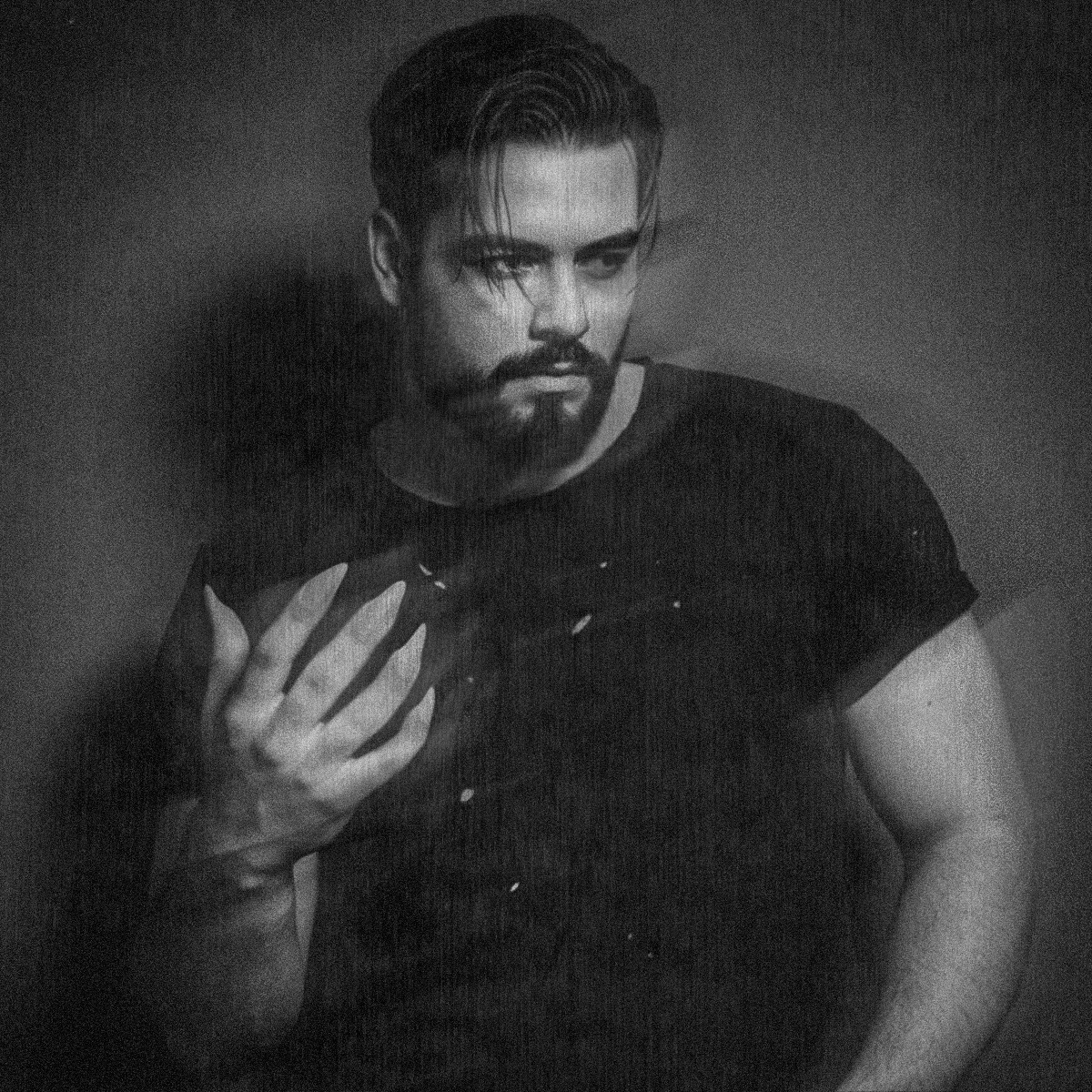
- Born: Dustin Nicholls; Merritt, British Columbia
- Occupations: Artist, singer, songwriter, author
- Website: https://astrazero.com/

Dustin Nicholls, known as Astra Zero, is a Canadian digital artist, illustrator, photographer, creative director, graphic designer and musician.

He began to use the name Astra Zero as a teenager in a punk band "and we all decided we wanted alter egos and for whatever reason".

== Family and early life ==
Nicholls grew up in Faro, Yukon. His biological father is part-First Nation, part-Scottish. He was a keen artist from a young age, painting and drawing. His grandfather, also an artist, taught him as a child. He began experimenting with digital art as a teenager, using a family scanner and printer saying, "I would collect random stuff like leaves and garbage and scan it and then layer it over old photos and then print them out and draw over them." He then moved into using Photoshop and other similar programmes.

== Work ==
Astra Zero's greatest influence is the Canadian artist, Floria Sigismondi. Other inspirations are horror, sci-fi and fantasy films, 90s cartoons plus gay and pop culture.

Collections have included Infernal, Queer Horror Icons, Night Rebels, Dirty Paper, Latex and Bones, Restless Vampire, Pop Culture and Dark Vintage.

=== Historical parodies ===
He created historical parodies of:

- The Descent from the Cross (1435) Rogier van der Weyden
- Age22 (1493) Albrecht Dürer
- Sleeping Venus (1508) Giorgione
- The Martyrdom of St. Sebastian (1577) El Greco
- The Nobleman with his Hand on his Chest (1580) El Greco
- Girl with a Pearl Earring (1665) Johannes Vermeer
- Portrait of Antoine-Laurent Lavoisier and his Wife (1788) Jacques-Louis David
- Nymphs and Satyr (1873) William-Adolphe Bouguereau
- The Wave (1896) William-Adolphe Bouguereau
- Triumph of Darkness (1896) Sascha Schneider
- La Jeune Fille et la Mort (1900) Henri-Léopold Lévy
- Soldat Germain Avec un Casque (1902) Osmar Schindler

His most popular parody is Temptation of Adam & Steve, a revamp of Adam and Eve (1628) by Peter Paul Rubens.

=== Other work ===
Astra Zero has worked regularly with Alice Glass and Alice Longyu Gao as photo and video editor, artist, photographer, animator, visualiser and director.

Astra Zero created the animation for The Pretty Reckless's 2020 music video Death by Rock and Roll with art direction by Lucas David. He created the artwork and text for the cover of REZZ + Alice Glass's single Not Enough and Saint Agnes's album Bloodsuckers. His work featured on the front cover of Bear World Magazine's 10th anniversary issue in October 2023.

=== Other artistic contributions ===
In 2024, Astra Zero created the new cover artwork for The Criterion Collection's re-release of the 1982 film Querelle. The artwork generated some discussion and controversy. Sources noted the bold and modern artistic direction taken for the cover of the film, which is known for its homoerotic themes and sensual imagery, with some finding it to be a significant departure from the film's aesthetic while others appreciated the fresh perspective.

== Publications ==
He has published the following books:

- Zero, Astra (2023). Retro Sinners. Astra Zero. ISBN 978-1738137299.
- Zero, Astra (2023). MENtality and Monsters. Astra Zero. ISBN 978-1738137251.
- Zero, Astra (2023). XXXL Activity and Colouring Book. Astra Zero. ISBN 978-1738137206.
- Zero, Astra (2023). Dark Vintage. Astra Zero. ISBN 978-1738137275.
- Zero, Astra (2023). Spooky Munch Adult Colouring Book. Astra Zero. ISBN 978-1738137282. with Dustin Nicholls
- Zero, Astra (2024). GRAYSCALE. Astra Zero. ISBN 978-1998329007.
- Zero, Astra (2024). Dark Vintage Vol.2. Astra Zero. ISBN 978-1998329052.
- Zero, Astra (2025). Dark Vintage Vol.3. Astra Zero. ISBN 978-1998329106.

== Music ==
Astra Zero has released thirteen singles and four EPs to date:

=== Singles ===
- Chemistry, Back To Life (2015)
- We Make the Rules (2016)
- Chemistry (2017)
- Walking on Fire, Wasted Tears (2018)
- Broke This, Let It Roll (2019)
- Broke This (Extended Version) (2020)
- Electric Hate / Revenge Spell (2024)
- Wasted Tears -variant2 (2025)
- Covered In Flies (2025)
- Nyctophilia (2025)

=== EPs ===
- Drafts & Demo_s. Vol. 001 : Vulgar (Instrumentals) (2025)
- Drafts & Demo_s. Vol. 001 : Vulgar (2025)
- Rotten : Drafts & Demo_s. Vol. 002 (2025)
- Victorian Vampire Machine (2025)

=== Other Releases ===
- broke this. again (Limited Edition Vinyl Record & CD) (2025)
