= Alice Glass (EP) =

2017 extended play (EP) by Alice Glass

EP by Alice Glass
- Released: 18 August 2017
- Genre: Electropop; post-industrial
- Length: 18:12
- Label: Loma Vista
- Producer: Jupiter Keyes; Matt Rad; Lars Stalfors

Alice Glass chronology
| Alice Glass (2017) | Prey//IV (2022) |

Singles from Alice Glass
- 1. "Without Love" Released: 10 August 2017; 2. "Forgiveness" Released: 11 January 2018

Alice Glass is the debut extended play (EP) by Canadian singer and songwriter Alice Glass, released on 18 August 2017 through Loma Vista Recordings. The EP marks Glass' first collection of solo material since her departure from electronic band Crystal Castles in 2014.

== Composition ==
The EP was written entirely by Glass, with additional writing and production by former Health member, Jupiter Keyes. Glass stated in an interview with Thump earlier in 2017 that some tracks "sound more like being eaten by fire ants" and others "are like being slowly consumed by a snake." She also stated that the most surprising thing about her new music is "that you can hear my voice clearly."

Anna Gaca of Spin described the EP as "pained, distorted electro-pop," saying that "some of its more dissonant experimentation is reminiscent of Grimes, while the dark but upbeat "Forgiveness" and "Blood Oath" hark back to Glass's time with Crystal Castles." Ondarock said the EP is a mixture of electropop and post-industrial music. Dazed's Selim Bulut said "the EP ranges from similarly explosive pop songs like the low-slung 4x4 groove of "Forgiveness" to eerie noise bangers like "Natural Selection" and the atmospheric "The Altar"." April Clare Welsh of Fact said the EP has "a dark, industrial-tinged electro-pop sound."

"Forgiveness" is about "being completely disillusioned by the things and people you've known." "White Lies" is about "the lies people have to tell themselves to find comfort when they feel trapped being around someone that hurts them or other people. most people who remain in abusive relationships do so because they're constantly being lied to. So they learn to lie to themselves as a form of false protection." "Blood Oath" is about "a teenage girl being preyed upon and taken advantage of by an older man."

Alice later reflected on the EP's recording being rushed by her label. "I wish I’d had more time. I was kind of going along with what my new label said. They were like, ‘No press, and then you’re going to go on tour with Marilyn Manson, this is a great idea.’ So, yeah." She has expressed interest in re-doing songs from the EP.

== Release and promotion ==
Glass surprise released the EP on 18 August 2017 after the release of the lead single "Without Love" on August 10, which was accompanied by a music video directed by Floria Sigismondi and produced by The Fader. A music video directed by Lindsey Mann for the second single "Forgiveness" was released on 11 January 2018.

She headed on tour alongside Marilyn Manson in promotion of the EP. The tour kicked off in North America in September 2017. Her tour that later included Zola Jesus and Pictureplane, as seen in backdrop visuals, was called "Suffer Lightning," pulling from the lyrics of Glass' debut single, "Stillbirth."

== Critical reception ==
Professional ratings
Review scores
| Source | Rating |
|---|---|
| Now Magazine | 3/5 stars |
| Pitchfork | 6.8/10 |

Sasha Geffen of Pitchfork said "Alice Glass can feel more like an exorcism than an evolution, a digestion of past trauma rather than a new chapter. But processing this stuff takes years, and sometimes a six-song "fuck you" is exactly the catharsis you need to start anew." Kevin Ritchie of Now Magazine wrote, "Whereas Crystal Castles often regards singers as just another instrument in the arsenal, melding shrieks and wails with walls of noise, Glass has turned the levels up on her vocals," finally stating that "none of these songs reach the anthemic highs (or blistering insanity) of Glass's biggest hits with Crystal Castles, but its balanced mood gives pointed new dimensions to her emotional intensity and shows she is just as compelling in gentle mode as she is going wild on stage." Stereogum's James Rettig called the EP "an abrasive but empowering listen that lets Glass brandish the captivating creative voice that drew us to her in the first place."

=== Accolades ===
| Publication | Accolade | Rank | Ref. |
|---|---|---|---|
| Stereogum | 25 Great EPs from 2017 | —N/a | |

== Track listing ==
Credits adapted from Tidal.

| No. | Title | Writer(s) | Producer(s) | Length |
|---|---|---|---|---|
| 1. | "Without Love" | Alice Glass; Jupiter Hoover-Keyes; Lars Stalfors | Keyes; Matt Rad; Stalfors | 3:55 |
| 2. | "Forgiveness" | Glass; Keyes; Atticus Ross | Keyes; Rad | 3:11 |
| 3. | "Natural Selection" | Glass; Keyes | Keyes | 2:22 |
| 4. | "White Lies" | Glass; Keyes | Keyes; Rad | 2:58 |
| 5. | "Blood Oath" | Glass; Keyes | Keyes; Rad^{[a]} | 3:08 |
| 6. | "The Altar" | Glass; Keyes | Keyes | 2:38 |
| Total length: | | | | 18:12 |

Notes

- ^{^[a]} signifies a co-producer

== Personnel ==
Credits adapted from the liner notes of Alice Glass.

- Alice Glass – vocals
- Jupiter Keyes – production
- Matt Rad – production (tracks 1, 2, 4), co-production (track 5)
- Lars Stalfors – production (track 1)
- Ryan Kaul – mixing
- Joe LaPorta – mastering
- Lucas David – photography

== Alice Glass (Remixes) ==
Alice Glass (Remixes)

EP by Alice Glass
- Released: 27 April 2018
- Length: 26:31
- Label: Loma Vista

Alice Glass (Remixes) is a remix EP of songs from Alice Glass, released on 27 April 2018.

=== Track listing ===
| No. | Title | Remixer(s) | Length |
|---|---|---|---|
| 1. | "Without Love" | Mija | 4:02 |
| 2. | "Natural Selection" | Ghostemane | 2:34 |
| 3. | "Blood Oath" | King Yosef | 3:18 |
| 4. | "The Altar" | Yves Tumor | 3:04 |
| 5. | "White Lies" | Pictureplane | 3:27 |
| 6. | "Forgiveness" | Paul White | 3:38 |
| 7. | "Stillbirth" | Zola Jesus | 2:50 |
| 8. | "Without Love" | Chelsea Wolfe | 3:38 |
| Total length: | | | 26:31 |
