= Without Love (Alice Glass song) =

Single

Single by Alice Glass

from the EP Alice Glass
- Released: 10 August 2017
- Genre: Electropop
- Length: 3:55
- Label: Loma Vista
- Songwriter(s): Alice Glass; Lars Stalfors; Jupiter Hoover-Keyes
- Producer(s): Matt Rad; Lars Stalfors; Jupiter Hoover-Keyes

Alice Glass singles chronology
"Stillbirth" (2015)	"Without Love" (2017)	"Forgiveness" (2018)

Music video
- "Without Love" on YouTube

"Without Love" is a song by the Canadian singer-songwriter Alice Glass. It was written by Glass, Lars Stalfors and Jupiter Keyes, and produced by the latter two and Matt Rad. The song was released by Loma Vista Recordings on 10 August 2017, as the lead single from Glass' self-titled debut EP.

== Music video ==
The music video was directed by Floria Sigismondi. It shows Glass being tied down and surrounded by flowers in various settings, including a nature-consumed room, an abandoned vintage car and an empty pool. When asked about the core message of the song, Sigismondi wrote in an email to The Fader, "I like the idea of something beautiful and dark living simultaneously in the same place, 'Without Love' has those themes. There are also themes of losing yourself, being told how to be, what to say ('tell me what to spit'). The garden vines are a metaphor for this." She wrote that she was inspired for this video by the works of the ceramic artist Jessica Cooper.

== Critical reception ==
Under the Radar described the song as "a slice of pop indulgence" and "a cleaner outing then [sic] her previous offering". Jack Tregoning of Junkee wrote that the song "finds Glass in a glossier mood", and includes "spiky edges" and "a new electronic-pop sheen". Lisa Wright of DIY described the song as "a bleak and introspective return" and "a surprisingly self-lacerating offering" from Glass. Michael Cuby of Paper called the song "an instantly recognizable blend of beauty and macabre that will make any former Crystal Castles fan stare in awe". Lauren O'Neill of Vice felt that Glass "delivered a Grimes-esque sad synth number with a big pop-sensibility". Justin Moran of Out regarded the song as "a glittery dark-pop number that carries the same dramatic weight as Glass' work before". Sasha Geffen of Pitchfork wrote the song sees Glass "singing gently and calmly, with breathy accents that belong more to the world of synthpop artists like Purity Ring than her punk and electroclash past."
