= Drinking Electricity =

Scottish Synthpop Trio

- Origin: Edinburgh, Scotland
- Genres: Synthpop; Post-punk
- Years active: 1980–1982
- Labels: Pop: Aural, Survival
- Past members: Anne-Marie Heighway; David Rome; Paul Edgley

Drinking Electricity were a post-punk/synthpop trio from Edinburgh, Scotland active during the early 1980s.

== History ==
The trio comprised Anne-Marie Heighway (vocals), David Rome (guitar, vocals), and Paul Edgley (bass). Rome had previously worked with Martin Lloyd in the band Analysis, which was later to evolve into Oppenheimer Analysis. They were signed by former Fast product boss Bob Last to his new Pop: Aural label. Their first two singles were both cover versions, the first a version of Johnny Kidd's "Shaking All Over", and the second a version of The Flamin' Groovies' "Shake Some Action". Their third single was their own composition, "Cruising Missiles", and was the last for Pop: Aural, with Heighway and Rome setting up their own Survival label for subsequent releases. First release on their new label was "Subliminal" in 1981. It would be early 1982 before their next release, the band's debut album Overload. The album was not well-received critically, with Trouser Press describing it as "simple, rather plain synth-rock with a strong electronic beat and thin ancillary instrumentation". After two further singles in 1982, the band split up. The Survival label went on to become one of the premiere "minimal wave" labels of the 80s, with releases by the likes of Richard Bone, Tik and Tok, Thirteen at Midnight, and Play, and several releases by Capercaillie.

"Good Times (Dance Mix)" was sampled by Crystal Castles on "Good Time" from their eponymous debut album in 2008.

== Discography ==
Chart placings shown are from the UK Indie Chart.

=== Singles ===
- "Shaking All Over" (1980) Pop: Aural (#43)
- "Shake Some Action" (1980) Pop: Aural
- "Cruising Missiles" (1980) Pop: Aural
- "Subliminal" (1981) Survival (#48)
- "Good Times" (1982) Survival (#50)
- "Subliminal (radical mix)" (1982) Survival

Split single

- Pete Shelley - "Witness the Change (Extended Instrumental)"/Drinking Electricity - "Superstition (Mirror Image Edit)" NYNX

=== Albums ===
- Overload (1982) Survival
