= Stillbirth (song) =

Single by Alice Glass
- Released: 17 July 2015
- Genre: Electropunk; industrial
- Length: 2:47
- Songwriters: Alice Glass; Jupiter Keyes
- Producers: Jupiter Keyes; Lars Stalfors

Alice Glass singles chronology
"Stillbirth" (2015)	"Without Love" (2017)

"Stillbirth" is the debut solo single by Canadian singer-songwriter Alice Glass, released on 17 July 2015. It is Glass' first release since her departure from Crystal Castles in 2014.

== Background and release ==
On 8 October 2014, Glass announced her departure from Crystal Castles for professional and personal reasons. In the announcement, she noted that working within the band compromised her efforts towards "sincerity, honesty, and empathy for others". Following her departure, she embarked on a solo career. She made her debut with "Stillbirth" on 15 July 2015 with no label involved. All proceeds from the song's sales benefit organizations (such as RAINN) that help survivors of domestic abuse, sexual violence, and incest. The lyrics were written by Glass with the music being composed by Glass and Jupiter Keyes in their basement.

== Critical reception ==
Noisey called "Stillbirth" "the most powerful track of [Glass'] musical career to date," elaborating: "it's a thunderous and beautiful assault on the senses that brings the best of the two songwriters together. With a clear refrain of "I want to start again" cutting straight through a sonic electrical storm, Glass is very much alive - and her voice has never sounded better." Dazed said the track is "an explosive, punch-to-the-gut sort of song where she screamed, "I've been waiting for you to die" over dystopic, stabbing synths," later noting: "It's not just the relentless, buzz wire synths, icy wall of distortion and screaming vocals that makes "Stillbirth" a stand-out, but the powerful statement that she posted alongside it." Laura Snapes of Pitchfork compared the song to "On Sight" from Kanye West's Yeezus, saying that they both feature "dystopian piledriver synths and unflinching statement of presence in the face of systematic oppression."

NME's Rhian Daly stated, "Musically, it's not worlds apart from Crystal Castles, all discordant electro noise colliding underneath Glass' strained, urgent vocals. There are lulls between the storms of sound – perhaps hints at the track's yet-to-be revealed "sister song that Glass describes as a "lullaby" – that offer pensive breaks in the chaos, only for it to build back up again, like the waves of a tsunami crashing down one by one," continuing: "'Stillbirth' is the sound of the Canadian singer releasing a truckload of pent-up emotions. It's angry, raw and uncompromising – a battering ram aimed right at the heart at those who've wronged her and a spine-tingling rise from the ashes. It's also the start of what looks to be a very exciting and promising solo career from Glass. With 'Stillbirth’, she's finally got the new start that she's been fighting for." Alt Citizen described the song as "a dark, industrial electronic track, with visceral lyrics that read like a diary entry gone wrong," further stating: "It's compelling, raw, and an incredibly brave account about her experience trapped in an abusive relationship. With "Stillbirth" you can't help but feel ignited with anger, but Glass's recognizable, high-pitched wails turn a heart-breaking song into an enjoyable electro-punk track."

== Versions ==
- "Stillbirth" – 2:47
- "Stillbirth (Zola Jesus Remix) – 2:50

== Personnel ==
Credits adapted from the liner notes of "Stillbirth".

- Alice Glass – vocals
- Jupiter Keyes – production
- Lars Stalfors – co-production, mixing
- Joe LaPorta – mastering
- Kraw – art direction, photography
