= Alice Glass =

Canadian singer and songwriter (born 1988)

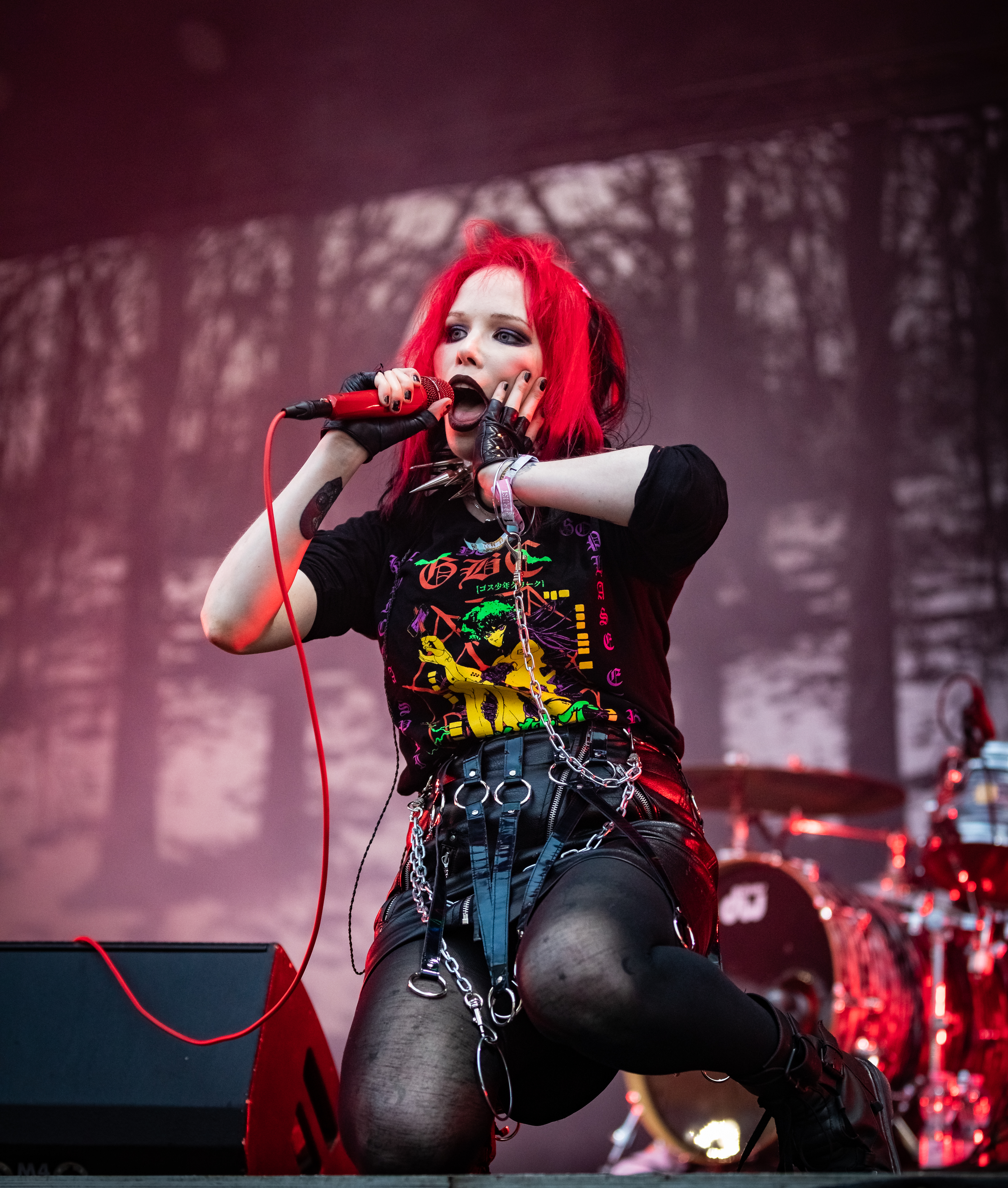
- Glass performing in 2019

Background information
- Also known as: Vicki Vale
- Born: Margaret Osborn; 25 August 1988 (age 38); Toronto, Ontario, Canada
- Genres: Electronic; electropunk
- Occupations: Singer; songwriter
- Years active: 2002–present
- Labels: Loma Vista; Eating Glass
- Formerly of: Crystal Castles
- Website: alice-glass.com

Margaret Osborn (born 25 August 1988), known professionally as Alice Glass, is a Canadian singer and songwriter. She is the co-founder and former frontwoman of the electronic band Crystal Castles. In 2014, she embarked on a solo career. She released her eponymous debut EP in 2017. Her solo debut album, Prey//IV, was released in February 2022.

== Life and career ==
=== 1988–2014: early life and Crystal Castles ===
Alice Glass was born Margaret Osborn on 25 August 1988 in Toronto, Ontario. She was raised Catholic, attending parochial school up until junior high. At age 15, she ran away from home to live in a squat community of punks under the name Vicki Vale after the comic book character of the same name and started an all-girl experimental punk band called Fetus Fatale. In December 2003, she and Ethan Kath began working together on the project that would become Crystal Castles. She picked the stage name Alice Glass based on a pin with the name Alice that she shoplifted and Hopey Glass, a character in Love and Rockets.

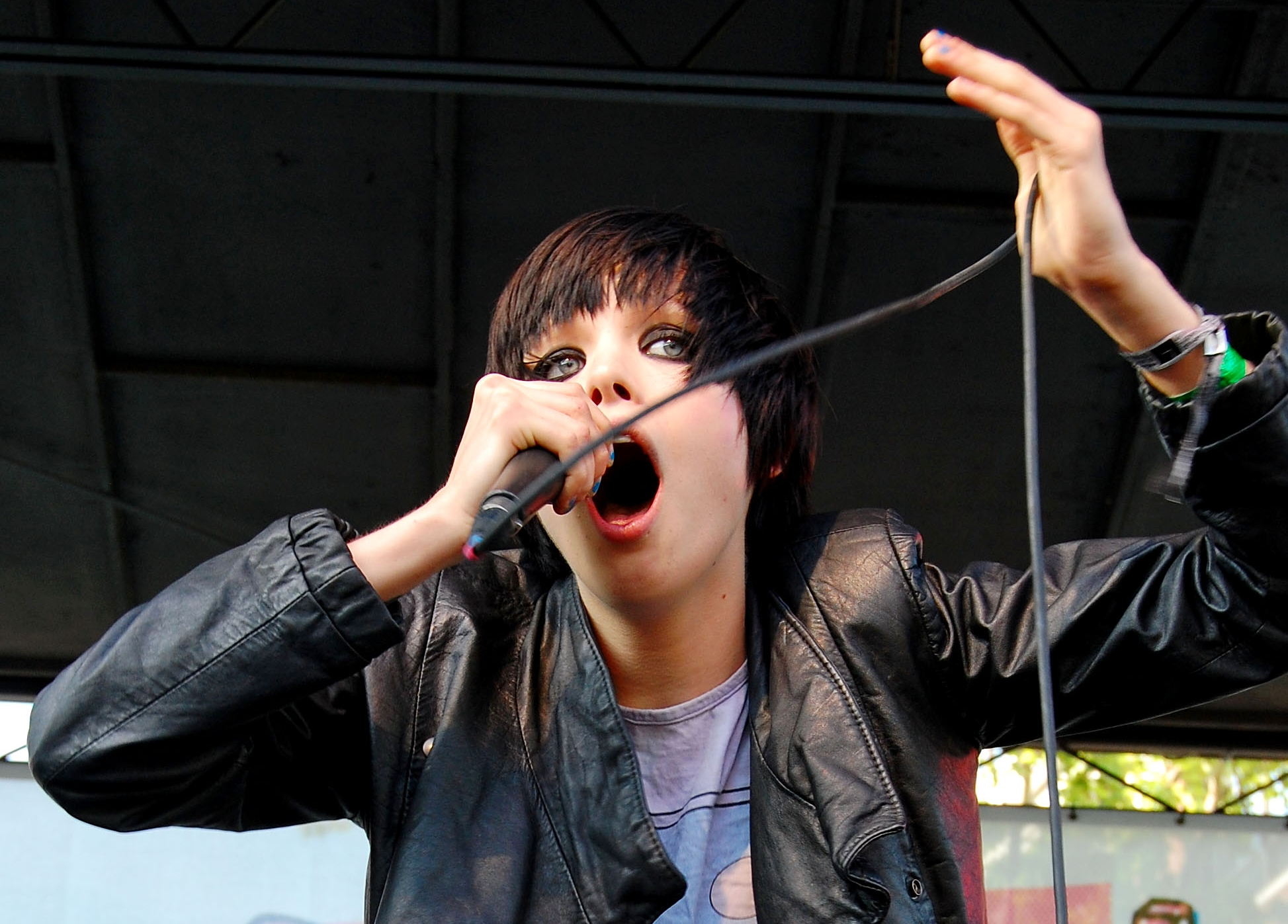
Glass performing in 2008

Crystal Castles' first official release was their 2006 single "Alice Practice". The song got the band their first record deal with Merok Records in London. The same year, Crystal Castles played their first live show at Clinton's Tavern in Toronto. "Alice Practice" was eventually featured on their eponymous debut album released in 2008. Glass topped NME's Cool List that year and responded to it by criticizing the idea of the cool list itself. The duo followed their debut album with two more critically acclaimed albums, II (2010) and III (2012), completing a trilogy. Glass co-wrote every Crystal Castles song she contributed vocals to.

In October 2014, Glass announced her departure from Crystal Castles due to her own professional and personal reasons. In the announcement, she noted that working within the band compromised her efforts towards "sincerity, honesty, and empathy for others". She later had a number of public disagreements with her former bandmate, including accusing him of assault and sexual misconduct.

=== 2015–2017: solo singles and lawsuit ===
In July 2015, Glass released her debut single as a solo artist, "Stillbirth". The release was largely an effort to increase awareness of domestic and sexual abuse. Glass worked with anti-sexual assault organization RAINN to donate all proceeds from the song's revenue to aid abuse victims.

In August 2017, Glass released "Without Love", which served as the lead single to her eponymous debut EP which was released the following week.

That same year, Alice Glass was added as the opening act for Marilyn Manson on the Heaven Upside Down Tour to support the album of the same name. However, the tour was wrought with safety issues. On September 29, during an encore performance of "The Beautiful People" at the Stage AE in Pittsburgh, Manson broke his ankle after jumping from the stage to sing with fans who were standing near the barricade. After the vocalist crawled back on-stage, the band abruptly abandoned the song. However, they resumed when Manson invited Glass on stage to take over vocals.

The following night, at the Hammerstein Ballroom in New York City during a performance of "Sweet Dreams", a large 750 kg – approximately 1650lbs – stage prop consisting of two oversized pistols attached via metal scaffolding fell on Manson, breaking his fibula in two places and knocking the singer unconscious for 15 minutes on stage until Manson was carried out on a stretcher to a nearby hospital.

The following nine dates of the North American leg were immediately cancelled, with the remaining October shows gradually cancelled over the next week. All of these shows – excluding festival appearances – were rescheduled for the beginning of 2018. On October 19th, Alice Glass posted on Facebook that she would not be returning to the rescheduled North American tour dates the following year, teasing her own future tour, and instead playing a show of her own at The Observatory North Park in San Diego on October 24.

In October 2017, Glass posted a statement on her official website explaining her departure from Crystal Castles, and accused co-founder Ethan Kath of sexual, physical, and mental abuse. The accusations detailed that the claimed abuse started when Glass was 15 and began recording with Kath and escalated until her eventual departure from Crystal Castles. Kath responded the same day in a statement issued to Pitchfork through his attorney, where he called the accusations "pure fiction" and said he was consulting with his lawyers as to his legal options. The following month, Kath sued Glass for defamation, but this was dismissed in February 2018. In May, Glass was awarded nearly US$21,000 in attorney fees after Kath's lawyers sought to vacate the dismissal of his defamation lawsuit against Glass.

=== 2018–2020: non-album single releases ===
In January 2018, Glass released "Forgiveness" as the second single from her EP. That month, she also released a single called "Cease and Desist", which she said "is a call to arms for all survivors". Both singles were accompanied by music videos.

In April 2018, Glass embarked on her SnowBlood Tour alongside American singer Zola Jesus, with electronic musician Pictureplane being an opening act on select dates. The tour is named after Lady Snowblood, spurned star of the eponymous 1973 Japanese film. Later that month, Glass released a remix EP, consisting of remixes of songs from her eponymous EP released in 2017. The EP includes remixes from both Zola Jesus and Pictureplane.

In June 2018, Glass released a new single, "Mine", accompanied by a music video directed by Lucas David and starring American drag queen Violet Chachki.

In December 2018, Glass was featured on Adult Swim's singles series with a new song titled "I Trusted You".

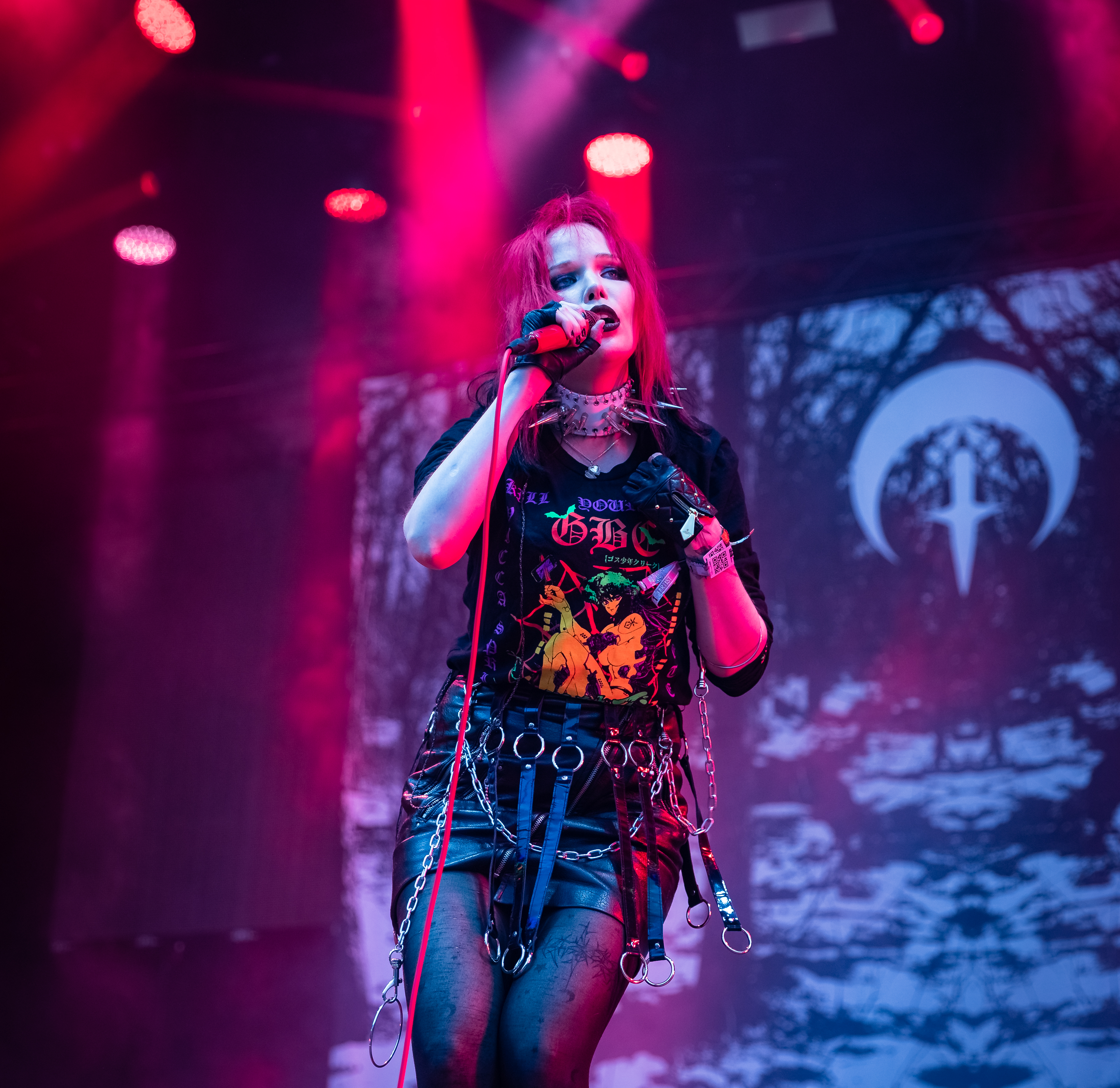
Alice Glass live at Rock am Ring 2019

Throughout 2020, Alice Glass released "Nightmares" and a remix of "Rajadão by Pabllo Vittar with experimental label Sermon 3 Recordings. "Nightmares" was later also re-released on label compilation album, Sermon 4 Anniversary. Later that year, Glass revealed that she does not receive appropriate royalties from her work in Crystal Castles. She disavowed her tenure in the band and asked fans to cease their support of the group.

=== 2021: Prey//IV ===
Glass released the single "Suffer and Swallow" on 6 January 2021, which was the first song she shared from her solo debut album. The song was accompanied by a stop-motion music video by Lucas David.

Glass had a guest appearance on Alice Longyu Gao's single "Legend" which was released on 27 May 2021.

On 19 November 2021, Glass unveiled the title and shared the track listing of her solo debut album Prey//IV and announced a release date of 28 January 2022 on her own Eating Glass Records. The announcement was accompanied the single "Baby Teeth", which had by a music video by Astra Zero and Lucas David.

On 8 December 2021, Glass premiered the single "Fair Game" accompanied by a music video directed by Bryan M. Ferguson.

On 28 January 2022, Glass released "Love Is Violence", after the album's release was delayed to February. The single was accompanied by a music video by Bryan M. Ferguson. The early 2000s-inspired video depicts two teenagers who sensually pull out each other's entrails.

Upon the album's release on the 16 February 2022, Glass premiered a music video for "Everybody Else" directed by Astra Zero.

Dazed described the album: "The extreme pop album is rammed with vivid portrayals of body horror, where eerie soundscapes intertwine with distorted and warped synths, accompanied by a drum loop that punctuates the tracks. These rough dissonances create a claustrophobic panorama, while Glass’ lyrics overlay descriptions of violent fantasies."

=== 2022–present: Recent activities ===
On 21 September 2022, Glass released a new single, "Lips Apart". On 18 April 2024, Glass released a cover of The Smashing Pumpkins song "Drown," produced by Jupiter Keyes. This cover track was later featured on the covers album, Sending Hearts to All My Dearies: A Tribute to the Smashing Pumpkins released on August 14, 2026 by Sumerian Records, featuring artists such as Tame Impala, Barns Courtney, Nita Strauss and Palaye Royale.

On 21 June 2024, Glass released a new single, "Remains", featuring New York-based musician Clip. The same day, a visualizer was also released on Glass's YouTube channel.

In November 2025, Glass released "MERCY KILL" which Margaret Farrell of Stereo Gum described as having "demonic vocals, crackles of skittering percussion, and pearlescent synths". The single previews a "larger project" due in 2026. The single was featured on the Alternative Press "A-sides: 10 new songs you have to hear" list for the week of November 21, 2025.

== Solo discography ==
=== Studio albums ===
Title	Album details
Prey//IV	Released: 16 February 2022; Label: Eating Glass Records; Formats: CD, USB, digital download

=== Extended plays ===
Title	Extended play details
Alice Glass	Released: 18 August 2017; Label: Loma Vista; Formats: LP, CD, digital download

=== Remix EPs ===
Title	Extended play details
Alice Glass (Remixes)	Released: 27 April 2018; Label: Loma Vista; Formats: LP, digital download

=== Singles ===
Title	Year	Album
"Stillbirth"	2015	Non-album single
"Without Love"	2017	Alice Glass
"Forgiveness"	2018	Alice Glass
"Cease and Desist"	2018	Non-album singles
"Mine"	2018	Non-album singles
"Suffer and Swallow"	2021	Prey//IV
"Baby Teeth"	2021	Prey//IV
"Fair Game"	2021	Prey//IV
"Love Is Violence"	2022	Prey//IV
"Lips Apart"	2022	Non-album singles
"Drown"	2024	Non-album singles
"Remains" (with CLIP)	2024	Non-album singles
"Catch and Release"	2025	Non-album singles
"Mercy Kill"	2025	Non-album singles

=== Guest appearances ===
Title	Year	Other artist(s)	Album
"Youth Problem"	2018	Dreamcrusher	Grudge2
"Dark Alley"	2018	Lil Zubin, Wicca Phase Springs Eternal	Heavy Down Pour
"I Trusted You"	2018	—N/a	Adult Swim x Fever Dreams
"Eat Me Alive Interlude"	2019	Nedarb	Amity
"Sleep It Off"	2020	—N/a	The Turning (Original Motion Picture Soundtrack)
"Nightmares"	2020	—N/a	Sermon 4 Anniversary
"Rajadão" (Remix)	2020	Pabllo Vittar	111 (Deluxe)
"Legend"	2021	Alice Longyu Gao	Non-album single
"Iron Fist" (Remix)	2021	Dorian Electra, Faris Badwan	My Agenda (Deluxe)
"Chastity"	2023	Pussy Riot, Boys Noize	Non-album single
"Not Enough"	2023	Rezz	It's Not a Phase
"Rosey Cheeks"	2024	Turkey	Clock Tower
"Drown"	2026	—N/a	Sending Hearts To All My Dearies: A Tribute To The Smashing Pumpkins

=== Music videos ===
Year	Title	Director(s)
2017	"Without Love"	Floria Sigismondi
2018	"Forgiveness"	Lindsey Nico Mann
2018	"Cease and Desist"	Lindsey Nico Mann, Dan Streit
2018	"Mine"	Lucas David
2018	"I Trusted You"	Lindsey Nico Mann
2020	"Sleep It Off"	Lindsey Nico Mann
2020	"Nightmares"	Lucas David
2021	"Suffer and Swallow"	Lucas David
2021	"Legend"	Olivia Aquilina
2021	"Baby Teeth"	Astra Zero and Lucas David
2021	"Fair Game"	Bryan M. Ferguson
2022	"Love Is Violence"	Bryan M. Ferguson
2022	"Everybody Else"	Astra Zero
2025	"Catch and Release"	Yulia Shur
