= It's My Life Tour =

1991–1992 concert tour by Tin Machine

- Tour by Tin Machine
- "It's My Life" Promotional Band Image; From L to R: David Bowie, Hunt Sales, Reeves Gabrels, Tony Sales
- Associated album: Tin Machine II
- Start date: 5 October 1991
- End date: 17 February 1992
- Legs: 3
- No. of shows: 69

Tin Machine concert chronology
- Tin Machine Tour (1989); It’s My Life Tour (1991–1992)
David Bowie tour chronology
| Sound+Vision Tour (1990) | It’s My Life Tour (1991–1992) | Outside Tour (1995–1996) |

The It's My Life Tour was a concert tour by the Anglo-American hard rock band Tin Machine. The tour commenced on 5 October 1991 after two warm-up shows, one press show and three trade-industry shows, visiting twelve countries and concluding after seven months and sixty-nine performances, a larger outing than their first tour in 1989.

== Tour details ==
The band rehearsed and warmed up for the tour in Dublin in August 1991. Joined onstage by guitarist Eric Schermerhorn, Tin Machine presented songs from the Tin Machine album and the Tin Machine II album, augmented with cover versions of songs from the Pixies, Neil Young and The Moody Blues.

To start the show at some venues, an old TV was placed on stage, playing old sitcoms while the prelude to Wagner's Tristan and Isolde played over loudspeakers.

The band purposefully booked intimate venues of a few thousand seats or less so that they could focus on the music without any theatrical trappings, a stark change from lead vocalist David Bowie's previous Glass Spider and Sound+Vision tours; Bowie also wanted to avoid playing larger venues and arenas lest his fans show up "hoping I'd be doing old songs or something. We don't want that feeling at all."

Bowie claimed that the setlist for the tour was made on the fly each night, saying "We have no setlist whatsoever. We have a complete list of all our songs on the floor of the stage and we yell it out as we feel it. If you catch us on a bad night, it can be one of the most disastrous shows you've ever seen. But on a good night – and fortunately with this band most nights have been good nights – it really happens".

== Critical reception ==
The review of the performance at the trade show at Slim's in San Francisco was not kind: "It's hard to imagine people walking out on a David Bowie show at Slim's, but all you had to do was look around the room Thursday at the end of the appearance by Tin Machine. (...) Bowie and his associates gave a more than hour-long display of his latest incarnation, and the music turned out to be nearly unlistenable."

The show in Seattle was met with positive reviews: "Let it first be said that on every level, Tin Machine is an outstanding band. (...) [they] may well represent the next evolutionary step in rock and roll – or just another blind alley. In any event, it is powerful stuff." During the show, Bowie played alto and baritone sax and electric, acoustic and 12-string guitar.

The Los Angeles Times had a positive review of the first New York show, complimenting the band on their desire to tinker with songs' arrangements and appreciating Bowie's "theatrical gift" for performing.

== Live recordings ==
Their performance on 1 September 1991 at the Los Angeles airport was taped for broadcast in America as part of the ABC In Concert series, and was aired on 6 September 1991.

Tin Machine were the musical guest on Saturday Night Live's 17th season on 23 November 1991.

The show in Hamburg on 24 October 1991, at Docks, was filmed and later released on the video, Oy Vey, Baby: Tin Machine Live at the Docks, with the song "Baby Can Dance" from the same performance appearing on the compilation album Best of Grunge Rock.

Songs from the concerts in Boston, New York City, Sapporo and Tokyo were recorded and released on the live album Tin Machine Live: Oy Vey, Baby (1992).

== Setlist ==
The following set list was obtained from the concert held on 30 October 1991, at Le Zénith Paris in Paris. It does not represent all concerts for the duration of the tour.

1. "Bus Stop"
2. "Under the God"
3. "A Big Hurt"
4. "Baby Can Dance"
5. "Shopping for Girls"
6. "Stateside"
7. "Goodbye Mr. Ed"
8. "I Can't Read"
9. "Go Now" (Bessie Banks cover)
10. "Baby Universal"
11. "Sacrifice Yourself"
12. "I've Been Waiting for You" (Neil Young cover)
13. "Betty Wrong"
14. "You Can't Talk"
15. "Debaser" (Pixies cover)
16. "If There Is Something" (Roxy Music cover)
17. "Heaven's in Here"
18. "One Shot"
19. "You Belong in Rock 'n' Roll"

== Tour dates ==
| Date | City | Country | Venue |
Tour rehearsals
| 10 August 1991 | Dublin | Ireland | Factory Studios |
| 11 August 1991 | Dublin | Ireland | Factory Studios |
| 12 August 1991 | Dublin | Ireland | Factory Studios |
| 13 August 1991 | Dublin | Ireland | Factory Studios |
| 14 August 1991 | Dublin | Ireland | Factory Studios |
| 15 August 1991 | Dublin | Ireland | Factory Studios |
Warm up shows
| 16 August 1991 | Dublin | Ireland | The Baggot Inn |
| 19 August 1991 | Dublin | Ireland | The Waterfront |
Press show
| 1 September 1991 | Los Angeles | United States | Rockit Cargo @ LAX Airport |
Trade shows
| 7 September 1991 | Minneapolis | United States | Marriott |
| 10 September 1991 | Los Angeles | United States | Marriott |
| 12 September 1991 | San Francisco | United States | Slim's |
Europe
| 5 October 1991 | Milan | Italy | Teatro Smeraldo |
| 6 October 1991 | Milan | Italy | Teatro Smeraldo |
| 8 October 1991 | Florence | Italy | Palazzetto Dello Sport |
| 9 October 1991 | Rome | Italy | Teatro Brancaccio |
| 10 October 1991 | Rome | Italy | Teatro Brancaccio |
| 12 October 1991 | Munich | Germany | Circus Krone |
| 14 October 1991 | Offenbach | Germany | Stadthalle |
| 15 October 1991 | Ludwigsburg | Germany | Forum |
| 17 October 1991 | Berlin | Germany | Neue Welt |
| 19 October 1991 | Copenhagen | Denmark | Falkoner Teatret |
| 21 October 1991 | Stockholm | Sweden | Circus |
| 22 October 1991 | Oslo | Norway | Oslo Konserthus |
| 24 October 1991 | Hamburg | Germany | Docks |
| 25 October 1991 | Hanover | Germany | Music Hall |
| 26 October 1991 | Cologne | Germany | E-Werk |
| 28 October 1991 | Utrecht | Netherlands | Muziekcentrum Vredenburg |
| 29 October 1991 | Paris | France | Olympia |
| 30 October 1991 | Paris | France | Le Zénith |
| 31 October 1991 | Brussels | Belgium | Ancienne Belgique |
| 2 November 1991 | Wolverhampton | England | Civic Hall |
| 3 November 1991 | Manchester | England | International 2 |
| 5 November 1991 | Newcastle upon Tyne | England | Mayfair |
| 6 November 1991 | Liverpool | England | Royal Court |
| 7 November 1991 | Glasgow | Scotland | Barrowlands |
| 9 November 1991 | Cambridge | England | Corn Exchange |
| 10 November 1991 | Brixton | England | Brixton Academy |
| 11 November 1991 | Brixton | England | Brixton Academy |
North America
| 15 November 1991 | Philadelphia | United States | Tower Theater |
| 16 November 1991 | Washington, D.C. | United States | The Citadel |
| 17 November 1991 | Philadelphia | United States | Tower Theater |
| 19 November 1991 | New Haven | United States | Toad's Place |
| 20 November 1991 | Boston | United States | Orpheum Theater |
| 24 November 1991 | Providence | United States | New Campus Club |
| 25 November 1991 | New Britain | United States | The Sting |
| 27 November 1991 | New York City | United States | Academy of Music |
| 29 November 1991 | New York City | United States | Academy of Music |
| 1 December 1991 | Montreal | Canada | La Brique |
| 2 December 1991 | Montreal | Canada | La Brique |
| 3 December 1991 | Toronto | Canada | The Concert Hall |
| 4 December 1991 | Detroit | United States | Clubland |
| 6 December 1991 | Cleveland | United States | Agora Metropolitan |
| 7 December 1991 | Chicago | United States | Riviera Theatre |
| 9 December 1991 | Dallas | United States | Bronco Bowl |
| 10 December 1991 | Houston | United States | Back Alley |
| 12 December 1991 | Los Angeles | United States | Hollywood Palladium |
| 14 December 1991 | San Diego | United States | Spreckels Theater |
| 15 December 1991 | San Diego | United States | Spreckels Theater |
| 17 December 1991 | San Francisco | United States | The Warfield |
| 18 December 1991 | San Francisco | United States | The Warfield |
| 20 December 1991 | Seattle | United States | Paramount Theatre |
| 21 December 1991 | Vancouver | Canada | Commodore Ballroom |
Asia
| 29 January 1992 | Kyoto | Japan | Kaikan Dai Ichi Hall |
| 30 January 1992 | Osaka | Japan | Festival Hall |
| 31 January 1992 | Osaka | Japan | Festival Hall |
| 2 February 1992 | Kitakyushu | Japan | Kyusyu Kouseinenkin Kaikan |
| 3 February 1992 | Hiroshima | Japan | Kouseinenkin Kaikan |
| 5 February 1992 | Tokyo | Japan | NHK Hall |
| 6 February 1992 | Tokyo | Japan | NHK Hall |
| 7 February 1992 | Yokohama | Japan | Bunka Taiikukan |
| 10 February 1992 | Sapporo | Japan | Kouseinenkin Kaikan |
| 11 February 1992 | Sapporo | Japan | Kouseinenkin Kaikan |
| 13 February 1992 | Sendai | Japan | Sunplaza Hall |
| 14 February 1992 | Omiya | Japan | Sonic City Hall |
| 17 February 1992 | Tokyo | Japan | Budokan Hall |

== Songs ==
Notation:

- ^{CD} Included on the Oy Vey, Baby album
- ^{VHS/LD} Included on the Oy Vey, Baby video album
- ^{CD/VHS/LD} Included on both versions of the Oy Vey, Baby album

From Live Santa Monica '72

- "My Death" (originally from La Valse à mille temps (1959) by Jacques Brel; written by Brel & Mort Shuman)
- "I'm Waiting for the Man" (originally from The Velvet Underground & Nico (1967) by The Velvet Underground and Nico, written by Lou Reed; outtake from various Bowie sessions 1966–72)

From Tin Machine

- "Heaven's in Here" ^{CD/VHS/LD}
- "Tin Machine" (Bowie, Reeves Gabrels, Hunt Sales, Tony Sales)
- "Crack City" ^{VHS/LD}
- "I Can't Read" (Bowie, Gabrels) ^{CD/VHS/LD}
- "Under the God" ^{CD/VHS/LD}
- "Amazing" (Bowie, Gabrels) ^{CD}
- "Bus Stop" (Country version) (Bowie, Gabrels) ^{VHS/LD}
- "Pretty Thing"
- "Sacrifice Yourself" (Bowie, H. Sales, T. Sales) ^{VHS/LD}
- "Baby Can Dance"

From Tin Machine II

- "Baby Universal" (Bowie, Gabrels) ^{VHS/LD}
- "One Shot" (Bowie, Gabrels) ^{VHS/LD}
- "You Belong in Rock 'n' Roll" (Bowie, Gabrels) ^{CD/VHS/LD}
- "If There Is Something" (originally from Roxy Music (1972) by Roxy Music; written by Bryan Ferry) ^{CD/VHS/LD}
- "Amlapura" (Bowie, Gabrels) ^{VHS/LD}
- "Betty Wrong" (Bowie, Gabrels) ^{VHS/LD}
- "You Can't Talk" (Bowie, Gabrels) ^{VHS/LD}
- "Stateside" (Bowie, H. Sales) ^{CD/VHS/LD}
- "Shopping for Girls" (Bowie, Gabrels)
- "A Big Hurt"
- "Sorry" (H. Sales)
- "Goodbye Mr. Ed" (Bowie, H. Sales, T. Sales) ^{CD/VHS/LD}

From Black Tie White Noise

- "I Feel Free" (originally from Fresh Cream (1966) by Cream; written by Pete Brown & Jack Bruce)

Other songs:

- "A Hard Rain's A-Gonna Fall" (from The Freewheelin' Bob Dylan (1963) by Bob Dylan; written by Dylan)
- "April in Paris" (from the Broadway musical Walk A Little Faster (1932); written by Vernon Duke and E. Y. Harburg)
- "Baby, Please Don't Go" (a single (1935) by Big Joe Williams)
- "Debaser" (from Doolittle (1989) by the Pixies; written by Black Francis)
- "Don't Start Me Talkin'" (a single (1955) by Sonny Boy Williamson II)
- "Dream On Little Dreamer" (from The Scene Changes (1965) by Perry Como; written by Jan Crutchfield and Fred Burch)
- "Fever" (a single (1956) by Little Willie John; written by Eddie Cooley and John Davenport (a.k.a. Otis Blackwell))
- "Go Now" (a single in 1964 by Bessie Banks and later made famous by The Moody Blues the following year; written by Larry Banks and Milton Bennett) ^{VHS/LD}
- "I'm a King Bee" (a single (1957) by Slim Harpo; written by Harpo)
- "In Every Dream Home a Heartache" (from For Your Pleasure (1973) by Roxy Music; written by Ferry)
- "I've Been Waiting for You" (originally from Neil Young (1968) by Neil Young; written by Young), later included on Bowie's 2002 album, Heathen (David Bowie album).
- "Shakin' All Over" (originally a single (1960) by Johnny Kidd and the Pirates; written by Johnny Kidd; B-side to "You Belong in Rock n' Roll")
- "Somewhere" (from the musical West Side Story (1957); written by Leonard Bernstein and Stephen Sondheim)
- "Throwaway" (from Primitive Cool (1987) by Mick Jagger of The Rolling Stones, written by Jagger)
- "Wild Thing" (by The Wild Ones (1965) and made famous by The Troggs; written by Chip Taylor)
- "(You Caught Me) Smilin'" (from There's a Riot Goin' On (1971) by Sly & the Family Stone; written by Sylvester Stewart)
- "You Must Have Been a Beautiful Baby" (from the Hard to Get soundtrack (1938) by Dick Powell; written by Harry Warren and Johnny Mercer)

== Personnel ==
Tin Machine

- David Bowie – vocals, guitar, alto & tenor saxophone
- Reeves Gabrels – lead guitar, vocals
- Tony Sales – bass guitar, vocals
- Hunt Sales – drums, vocals

Additional musicians

- Eric Schermerhorn – rhythm guitar, vocals
