= Under the God =

Song by Tin Machine

Single by Tin Machine

from the album Tin Machine
- B-side: "Sacrifice Yourself"
- Released: June 1989
- Recorded: Montreux; Nassau, August 1988 - early 1989
- Genre: Rock
- Length: 4:06
- Label: EMI
- Songwriter: David Bowie
- Producers: Tin Machine; Tim Palmer

Tin Machine singles chronology
"Under the God" (1989)	"Tin Machine" (1989)

"Under the God" is the first official single released by Anglo-American hard rock band Tin Machine, taken from their eponymous debut album in June 1989.

== Song information ==
"Under the God", which came from a demo originally called "Night Train", was a song that excoriated Neo-Nazism.

Although "Heaven's in Here" was actually the album's first single, it was only released promotionally, which made "Under the God" the first official single, released after the album was already available.

== Critical reception ==
Jerry Smith, reviewer of British music newspaper Music Week, reviewed the single positively, saying that it reminds him of Bowie's "Panic in Detroit" and expressed the assurance that it "should ignite the charts".

== Music video ==
The band elected not to create music videos for the album's singles, and instead created a 13-track megamix video for the entire album. The video, directed by Julien Temple, presented edits of each song in vignette form, and included "Under the God" masqueraded as a performance, with the audience storming the stage.

== Live performances ==
"Under the God" was performed live on both the 1989 Tin Machine Tour and 1991-92's It's My Life Tour. A live performance of the song, recorded in Sapporo, Japan in 1992, was included on the live album Tin Machine Live: Oy Vey, Baby (1992).

== Track listing ==
7" version

1. "Under the God" (Bowie) – 4:06
2. "Sacrifice Yourself" (Bowie, Sales, Sales) – 2:08

10"/12"/CD version

1. "Under the God" (Bowie) – 4:06
2. "Sacrifice Yourself" (Bowie, Sales, Sales) – 2:08
3. "The Interview" (An interview with the band) – 12:23

== Credits and personnel ==
Producers

- Tin Machine
- Tim Palmer

Musicians

- David Bowie – lead vocals, rhythm guitar
- Reeves Gabrels – lead guitar
- Hunt Sales – drums, backing vocals
- Tony Sales – bass guitar, backing vocals

== Chart performance ==
Chart (1989)	Position
Australian Singles Chart	97
UK Singles Chart	51
US Billboard Alternative Songs	4
US Mainstream Rock	8

== Notes ==
- Pegg, Nicholas, The Complete David Bowie, Reynolds & Hearn Ltd, 2000, ISBN 1-903111-14-5
