= Heaven's in Here =

Song by David Bowie

Single by Tin Machine

from the album Tin Machine
- Released: 1989
- Recorded: Montreux; Nassau, August 1988 - early 1989
- Genre: Rock
- Length: 6:01
- Label: EMI
- Songwriter: David Bowie
- Producers: Tin Machine; Tim Palmer

Tin Machine singles chronology
"Heaven's in Here" (1989)	"Under the God" (1989)

"Heaven's in Here" is the lead track from the eponymous debut album by the Anglo-American hard rock band Tin Machine. Written by David Bowie, it was released as a promotional lead single from the album in 1989.

It was performed live on Tin Machine's 1989 Tin Machine Tour and 1991–92 It's My Life Tour, and a live version appeared on their live album Tin Machine Live: Oy Vey, Baby (1992).

== Background and release ==
"Heaven's in Here" was the first song the band wrote and recorded together, coming together in approximately a day, although mixing and overdubs continued for months afterwards. It was also both the first and the last track Tin Machine played together live.

A music video for the song was produced by Julien Temple. A 4 minute edit of the song was produced and originally intended to be released as a single, but it was ultimately released only promotionally.

The opening guitar riff to the song was occasionally performed as the intro to live versions of "The Jean Genie" during Bowie's 1997 Earthling Tour, on which Gabrels was the guitarist.

== Track listing ==
1. "Heaven's in Here" (edited version) – 4:17
2. "Heaven's in Here" (album version) – 6:05

== Credits and personnel ==
Tin Machine

- David Bowie – lead vocals, rhythm guitar
- Reeves Gabrels – lead guitar
- Hunt Sales – drums, backing vocals
- Tony Sales – bass, backing vocals

Producers

- Tin Machine
- Tim Palmer

== Charts ==
=== Weekly charts ===
Chart (1989)	Peak position
Italy Airplay (Music & Media)	2
US Billboard Alternative Songs	12
