= You Belong in Rock n' Roll =

Song by Tin Machine

Single by Tin Machine

from the album Tin Machine II
- B-side: "Amlapura" (Indonesian version)
- Released: 12 August 1991
- Recorded: Sydney September – October 1989; April 1990; September – October 1990; Los Angeles, March 1991
- Genre: Rock
- Length: 3:33
- Label: London; LON 305
- Songwriters: Bowie, Gabrels
- Producers: Tin Machine, Tim Palmer

Tin Machine singles chronology
"Prisoner of Love" (1989)	"You Belong in Rock n' Roll" (1991)	"Baby Universal" (1991)

"You Belong in Rock n' Roll" is a song by Anglo-American hard rock band Tin Machine, released ahead of their second album in August 1991. The song was the band’s first release on Victory Records, which was distributed by London Records in the UK.

== Background and recording ==
Recorded in 1989 after Tin Machine's first tour, the song spent a year in mixing and overdubs by guitarist Reeves Gabrels, who was inspired by Nine Inch Nails' album Pretty Hate Machine (1989), saying that "You Belong in Rock n' Roll" started basically "as a bass song. I wanted to lay in some industrial stuff against it." Gabrels tried using an electric razor to influence the sound of his guitar for the song, but ended up instead using a vibrator that he bought from a local sex store.

The single was launched with a barrage of publicity, including appearances on Top of the Pops, where Gabrels chose to play his guitar with a chocolate éclair, and Wogan, where the band again mimed, and this time Gabrels played his guitar with the vibrator, and lead vocalist David Bowie visibly tired of the host’s patter. The single peaked at UK No. 33 – a disappointment, but it would be Tin Machine’s biggest hit single.

== Track listing ==
=== 7" version ===
1. "You Belong in Rock 'n' Roll" (Bowie, Gabrels) – 3:33
2. "Amlapura" (Indonesian version) (Bowie, Gabrels) – 3:49

=== 12"/CD version 1 ===
1. "You Belong in Rock n' Roll" (Extended version) (Bowie, Gabrels) – 6:32
2. "You Belong in Rock n' Roll" (LP version) (Bowie, Gabrels) – 4:07
3. "Amlapura" (Indonesian version) (Bowie, Gabrels) – 3:49
4. "Shakin' All Over" (Live) (Kidd) – 2:49

=== CD version 2 ===
1. "You Belong in Rock n' Roll" (Bowie, Gabrels) – 3:33
2. "Amlapura" (Indonesian version) (Bowie, Gabrels) – 3:49
3. "Stateside" (H. Sales) – 5:38
4. "Hammerhead" (Bowie, H. Sales) – 3:15

== Credits and personnel ==
Producers

- Tin Machine
- Tim Palmer

Musicians

- David Bowie – vocals, guitar, saxophone
- Reeves Gabrels – lead guitar
- Hunt Sales – drums, vocals
- Tony Sales – bass, vocals
- Kevin Armstrong – rhythm guitar

== Live versions ==
- A live version recorded during the 1991 Tin Machine tour was released on the live album Tin Machine Live: Oy Vey, Baby in 1992.

== Charts ==
Chart (1991)	Peak position
France (SNEP)	42
Netherlands (Single Top 100)	51
UK Singles (OCC)	33
UK Airplay (Music Week)	24

== Bibliography ==
- Pegg, Nicholas, The Complete David Bowie, Reynolds & Hearn Ltd, 2000, ISBN 1-903111-14-5
