= Prisoner of Love (Tin Machine song) =

Single by Tin Machine

from the album Tin Machine
- B-side: "Baby Can Dance" (Live) / "Crack City" (Live)
- Released: 30 October 1989
- Recorded: August 1988 – early 1989; studio material recorded at Mountain Studios, Montreux Switzerland, and Compass Point Studios, Nassau live recording 25th of June 1989; at La Cigale, Paris
- Genre: Rock
- Length: 4:09
- Label: EMI; MT 76
- Songwriters: David Bowie; Reeves Gabrels; Hunt Sales; Tony Sales
- Producers: Tin Machine; Tim Palmer

Tin Machine singles chronology
"Tin Machine" / "Maggie's Farm (live)" (1989)	"Prisoner of Love" (1989)	"You Belong in Rock n' Roll" (1991)

"Prisoner of Love" is a song by Tin Machine taken from their eponymous debut album, issued as their third single in October 1989.

== Song development ==
Bowie claimed at the time he wrote the song for his then-partner Melissa Hurley. It reads as worldly advice from the singer to his naive younger girlfriend.

== Live performances and video ==
The band elected not to make music videos for singles from the album, and instead created a 13-minute megamix video, in which "Prisoner of Love" was included. The video, directed by Julien Temple, went unreleased commercially until its 30th anniversary in 2019.

"Prisoner of Love" was performed during the 1989 Tin Machine Tour. The single was backed by live tracks recorded at La Cigale, Paris on 25 June 1989, and had a novel heart-shaped 7" picture disc release. It failed to chart in the UK or the US.

== Track listing ==
7" version

1. "Prisoner of Love" (Edit) (Bowie, Gabrels, Sales, Sales) – 4:09
2. "Baby Can Dance" (Live) (Bowie) – 6:16

12"/CD version

1. "Prisoner of Love" (Edit) (Bowie, Gabrels, Sales, Sales) – 4:09
2. "Baby Can Dance" (Live) (Bowie) – 6:16
3. "Crack City" (Live) (Bowie) – 5:13
4. "Prisoner of Love" (LP version) (Bowie, Gabrels, Sales, Sales) – 4:51

== Credits and personnel ==
Producers

- Tin Machine
- Tim Palmer

Musicians

- David Bowie – vocals, guitar
- Reeves Gabrels – lead guitar
- Hunt Sales – drums, vocals
- Tony Sales – bass, vocals

Additional musicians

- Kevin Armstrong – rhythm guitar
