= One Shot (Tin Machine song) =

Song by Tin Machine

Single by Tin Machine

from the album Tin Machine II
- Released: November 1991
- Recorded: Sydney September – November 1989; April 1990; September – October 1990; Los Angeles March 1991
- Genre: Rock
- Length: 4:02 (single); 5:11 (album)
- Label: London
- Songwriters: David Bowie, Reeves Gabrels
- Producers: Tin Machine, Hugh Padgham

Tin Machine singles chronology
"Baby Universal" (1991)	"One Shot" (1991)

"One Shot" is the second track from the album Tin Machine II by Tin Machine. It was released as the third single from the album, making it their sixth single overall, and the last single released by the band.

== Background and recording ==
Originally recorded in 1989 after the first Tin Machine Tour, several demo recordings of rehearsals of the song exist and were eventually leaked online. As the second Tin Machine album was being released by a new label, label executives requested that the song be re-recorded by "notable" producer Hugh Padgham, who had previously worked with lead vocalist David Bowie on his 1984 solo album Tonight. This newly recorded version was, according to Reeves Gabrels, a note-by-note remake of the original with a slightly better guitar solo.

The b-side, an original song by drummer Hunt Sales and Bowie, was described by Nicholas Pegg as your "standard pseudo-sexist Tin Machine fare". A one-minute excerpt from the end of the song appears as a hidden track at the end of the Tin Machine II album.

== Track listing ==
=== European CD single (London/Victory 869 574-2) ===
1. "One Shot"– 4:02
2. "Hammerhead"– 3:14

=== US promo CD (Victory CDP 522) ===
1. "One Shot" (single version) – 4:02
- The CD was released in a tri-fold CD case, which folded out to show one of the Kouros statues from the album's cover, with the front of the statue on the inside and the back on the outside. The single was cut to allow the statue to appear to be holding the CD in its arms. Unlike the US album release, the statue's penis was not airbrushed out.

== Production credits ==
Producers

- Tin Machine
- Hugh Padgham

Musicians

- David Bowie – lead vocals, guitar
- Reeves Gabrels – lead guitar
- Hunt Sales – drums, vocals
- Tony Sales – bass, vocals
- Kevin Armstrong – rhythm guitar

== Chart performance ==
Chart (1991)	Position
US Billboard Alternative Songs	3
US Mainstream Rock Tracks	17
