= Tin Machine (song) =

Song by Tin Machine

"Tin Machine/Maggie's Farm"

Single by Tin Machine

from the album Tin Machine
- B-side: "Maggie's Farm" (live)
- Released: 28 August 1989
- Recorded: August 1988 – early 1989; studio material recorded at Mountain Studios, Montreux Switzerland, and Compass Point Studios, Nassau live recording 25th of June 1989; at La Cigale, Paris
- Genre: Rock
- Length: 3:34/4:29
- Label: EMI; MT 73
- Songwriters: Bowie, Gabrels, Sales, Sales
- Producers: Tin Machine; Tim Palmer

Tin Machine singles chronology
| "Under the God" (1989) | "Tin Machine" / "Maggie's Farm" (1989) | "Prisoner of Love" (1989) |

"Tin Machine" is a song by Anglo-American hard rock band Tin Machine, and the song from which they took their name, a track from their debut album, also of the same name. It was released as a single in September 1989, as a double A-side with a live cover of Bob Dylan’s “Maggie's Farm”.

== Song development and live performances ==
According to guitarist Reeves Gabrels, naming the band after the song was the idea of the Sales brothers, who reasoned "It’s like having your own theme tune".

"Maggie’s Farm" and the other live tracks were recorded at the band’s gig at La Cigale, Paris on 25 June 1989. Both songs had videos – "Tin Machine" featured in an excerpt from Julien Temple’s promotional film as a mock performance where the fans stormed the stage, leaving lead vocalist David Bowie with a nosebleed; and "Maggie’s Farm" was recorded live. Despite this, the double-A side entered the chart at its UK No. 48 peak.

The live version of "Bus Stop" (also released as the Country version, or Live Country version) would later appear as a bonus track on 1995 Virgin Records reissue of Tin Machine.

== Track listing ==
7" version

1. "Tin Machine" (Bowie, Gabrels, Sales, Sales) – 3:34
2. "Maggie's Farm" (Live) (Dylan) – 4:29

12" version

1. "Tin Machine" (Bowie, Gabrels, Sales, Sales) – 3:34
2. "Maggie’s Farm" (Live) (Dylan) – 4:29
3. "I Can't Read" (Live) (Bowie, Gabrels) – 6:13

CD version

1. "Tin Machine" (Bowie, Gabrels, Sales, Sales) – 3:34
2. "Maggie's Farm" (Live) (Dylan) – 4:29
3. "I Can't Read" (Live) (Bowie, Gabrels) – 6:13
4. "Bus Stop" (Live) (Bowie, Gabrels) – 1:52

== Credits and personnel ==
Producers

- Tin Machine
- Tim Palmer

Musicians

- David Bowie – vocals, guitar
- Reeves Gabrels – lead guitar
- Hunt Sales – drums, vocals
- Tony Sales – bass, vocals

Additional musicians

- Kevin Armstrong – rhythm guitar
