= Tin Machine Tour =

1989 concert tour by Tin Machine

- Tour by Tin Machine
- Ticket to the concert in Bradford, UK
- Location: North America; Europe
- Associated album: Tin Machine
- Start date: 14 June 1989
- End date: 3 July 1989
- Legs: 1
- No. of shows: 12

Tin Machine concert chronology
- Tin Machine Tour (1989); It's My Life Tour (1991–92)
David Bowie tour chronology
| Glass Spider Tour (1987) | Tin Machine Tour (1989) | Sound+Vision Tour (1990) |

The Tin Machine Tour was a concert tour headlined by the Anglo-American hard rock band Tin Machine. Following a performance of "Heaven's in Here" at the International Music Awards in New York City on 31 May 1989, the tour started on 14 June 1989 at The World in New York City, and finished on 3 July 1989 at The Forum in Livingston, Scotland. The tour comprised 12 performances in six countries, in venues with a capacity of 2,000 or less. Joined onstage by Kevin Armstrong, the band performed the entirety of their eponymous debut album with the exception of "Video Crime", augmented with cover version of songs from Bob Dylan and Johnny Kidd & The Pirates.

== Tour performance details ==
The band played in "fashionable black suits" in front of stark lighting in what was described as a departure from lead vocalist David Bowie's previous solo tour. The second concert at The Roxy Theatre in Los Angeles on 17 June 1989, was added at the last minute, when Bowie saw the long lines for tickets to the first show on 16 June; the show was at midnight (technically the night of 16 June), and tickets were sold at half-price. For the concert in Amsterdam on 24 June 1989, video screens were erected outside the venue for those unable to obtain tickets. The video for "Maggie's Farm" was recorded at the same venue.

== Critical reception ==
The Los Angeles Times had a positive review of Tin Machine's first show of the tour in New York City, saying "the band was full of life, raucous and brash, good-natured and smart." Rolling Stone described fans who had gone to see "the Thin White Duke crooning 'Young Americans'" as receiving a rude awakening as Bowie offered "no oldies, no encores and no apologies," and that it was Bowie's presence that "elevated the songs from the level of average grunge to that of theatrical avant-garage rock", which it later said helped Bowie regain some of the credibility he had lost during his previous album and tour.

== Live recordings ==
The 25 June performance at La Cigale, Paris was recorded with excerpts broadcast on Westwood One FM radio. Four songs from the same performance were released as b-sides to the 1989 singles; "Tin Machine" and "Prisoner of Love." 8 songs performed at this show were released digitally on the album Live at La Cigale, Paris, June 25th, 1989 in August 2019, to coincide with the album's 30th anniversary. The digital release was mastered by original album producer Tim Palmer.

== Setlist ==
The following set list was obtained from the concert held on 14 June 1989, at The World in New York City. It does not represent all concerts for the duration of the tour.

1. "Sacrifice Yourself"
2. "Heaven's in Here"
3. "Amazing"
4. "Working Class Hero" (John Lennon song)
5. "Tin Machine"
6. "Sorry"
7. Prisoner of Love
8. "Bus Stop" (country version)
9. "Bus Stop"
10. "I Can't Read"
11. "You've Been Around"
12. "Baby Can Dance"
13. "Run"
14. "Crack City"
15. "Pretty Thing"
16. "Under The God"

== Tour dates ==
List of concerts, showing date, city, country, venue and opening act
| Date | City | Country | Venue | Opening act |
North America
| 14 June 1989 | New York City | United States | The World | —N/a |
| 16 June 1989 | Los Angeles | United States | The Roxy | —N/a |
| 17 June 1989 | Los Angeles | United States | The Roxy | —N/a |
Europe
| 21 June 1989 | Copenhagen | Denmark | Saga Rockteatre | —N/a |
| 22 June 1989 | Hamburg | West Germany | Docks | —N/a |
| 24 June 1989 | Amsterdam | Netherlands | Paradiso | —N/a |
| 25 June 1989 | Paris | France | La Cigale | La Place |
| 27 June 1989 | London | England | Town & Country Club | Jesus Jones |
| 29 June 1989 | London | England | National Ballroom | —N/a |
| 1 July 1989 | Newport | Wales | Newport Leisure Centre | —N/a |
| 2 July 1989 | Bradford | England | St. George's Hall | —N/a |
| 3 July 1989 | Livingston | Scotland | The Forum | —N/a |

== Songs performed ==
From Tin Machine

- "Heaven's in Here"
- "Tin Machine"
- "Prisoner of Love"
- "Crack City"
- "I Can't Read"
- "Under the God"
- "Amazing"
- "Working Class Hero" (John Lennon song)
- "Bus Stop"
- "Pretty Thing"
- "Run"
- "Sacrifice Yourself"
- "Baby Can Dance"

From Tin Machine II

- "Sorry"

From Black Tie White Noise

- "You've Been Around"

Other songs:

- "Maggie's Farm" (Bob Dylan song)
- "Now" (unreleased from Tin Machine)
- "Shakin' All Over" (Johnny Kidd and the Pirates song)

== Personnel ==
Tin Machine

- David Bowie – vocals, guitar
- Reeves Gabrels – guitar
- Tony Sales – bass guitar, vocals
- Hunt Sales – drums, vocals

Additional musicians

- Kevin Armstrong – rhythm guitar, vocals
