= Tin Machine Live: Oy Vey, Baby =

Live album by Tin Machine
- Released: 27 July 1992
- Recorded: 20 November 1991 – 11 February 1992
- Venue: Orpheum Theatre, Boston; The Academy, New York City; Riviera, Chicago; NHK Hall, Tokyo; Kouseinenkin Kaikan, Sapporo
- Genre: Rock
- Length: 49:17
- Label: London
- Producer: Reeves Gabrels, Max Bisgrove, Tom Dubé, Dave Bianco, David Bowie

Tin Machine chronology
Tin Machine II (1991)	Tin Machine Live: Oy Vey, Baby (1992)	Live at La Cigale, Paris, 25th June, 1989 (2019)

David Bowie chronology
Tin Machine II (1991)	Tin Machine Live: Oy Vey, Baby (1992)	Black Tie White Noise (1993)

Tin Machine Live: Oy Vey, Baby is a live album by Anglo-American rock band Tin Machine, originally released through London Records on 27 July 1992. The album includes songs, all from the band's two albums, recorded between 20 November 1991 and 11 February 1992 from five venues on the North American and Asian legs of Tin Machine's It's My Life Tour. The maligned album title was intended as a pun on U2's 1991 album Achtung Baby. Oy Vey, Baby has received negative reviews, with many criticising the performances. It failed to chart in both the UK and the US. It was accompanied by a concert video of the same title, which was filmed at The Docks, Hamburg on 24 October 1991. Following its release, Tin Machine disbanded and Bowie quickly resumed his solo career with Black Tie White Noise (1993).

== Overview ==
Tin Machine, composed of English singer-songwriter David Bowie, American guitarist Reeves Gabrels and American brothers Tony Fox and Hunt Sales on bass and drums, respectively, supported Tin Machine II with a seven-month tour called the It's My Life Tour, which started in October 1991 and ran through February 1992. Reviews for the shows were mixed, with some complaining over the lack of Bowie's older hits. The setlist for the tour included most of Tin Machine and all of Tin Machine II, with covers including the Pixies' "Debaser", Neil Young's "I've Been Waiting for You" and the Moody Blues' "Go Now".

Tin Machine Live: Oy Vey, Baby solely contains tracks from the band's two records, including an eight-minute rendition of the Hunt Sales-sung "Stateside" and a twelve-minute version of "Heaven's in Here". The album was recorded at five venues. According to biographer Nicholas Pegg, "I Can't Read" was taped on 20 November 1991 at the Orpheum Theatre in Boston; "Stateside" and "Heaven's in Here" were recorded at the Academy in New York City in late November; "Amazing" and "You Belong in Rock n' Roll" followed on 7 December at the Riviera in Chicago; "If There Is Something" and "Goodbye Mr. Ed" followed in February 1992 at NHK Hall in Tokyo; "Under the God" was taped the same month at Kouseinenkin Kaikan in Sapporo. The album's mix was overseen by Gabrels and tour engineer Max Bisgrove.

The title, suggested by Hunt Sales, was intended as a pun on U2's 1991 album Achtung Baby. Plans for a second live album (reportedly titled Use Your Wallet, another Sales pun, this time on Guns N' Roses 1991 albums Use Your Illusion I and II) were shelved. Gabrels later stated that the title was "a play on the fact that there are no original ideas". Both the title and cover artwork were panned by reviewers. Tin Machine Live: Oy Vey, Baby was released through London Records on 27 July 1992 on different LP and CD formats, with the catalogue numbers 828 3281 and 828 3282, respectively. It became the first album Bowie released since his 1967 self-titled album to fail to chart in the UK; it also didn't chart in the US. Following its release, Tin Machine disbanded and Bowie resumed his solo career with Black Tie White Noise (1993).

== Critical reception ==
Tin Machine Live: Oy Vey, Baby received negative reviews from music critics. All Music Guide's Mark Allender gave the album two stars out of five, finding that the songs did not translate well to a live setting. Paul Mathur for Melody Maker declared that with the album, Bowie "ceases to exist as an artist of any worth whatsoever". Pegg laments that the album suffered due to "ugly, indistinct packaging", "an unspeakably misconceived title", and an unimaginative playlist that included an 8-minute version of the "dreaded" "Stateside", all of which combined to lackluster sales and poor reviews. Still, he reserved some good judgement for the release ("it's not actually a bad album"). James Perone calls it Tin Machine's least essential album and "among the least essential handful of albums associated with Bowie", while David Buckley similarly calls it the least essential album of Bowie's entire career. Stephen Thomas Erlewine of AllMusic called the album "not enough to rescue the batch of underdeveloped songs that form the backbone of the record". Despite the negative reviews, Gabrels considered Oy Vey Baby Tin Machine's best release, telling Buckley: "That band was really about being a live band. It was a garage band on steroids with a big budget!"

== Track listing ==
All tracks are written by David Bowie and Reeves Gabrels except where noted.

No.	Title	Writer(s)	Recording dates and location	Length
1.	"If There Is Something"	Bryan Ferry	17 February 1992 in Tokyo	3:55
2.	"Amazing"		7 December 1991 in Chicago	4:06
3.	"I Can't Read"		20 November 1991 in Boston	6:25
4.	"Stateside"	Bowie, Hunt Sales	27 or 29 November 1991 in New York	8:11
5.	"Under the God"	Bowie	10 or 11 February 1992 in Sapporo	4:05
6.	"Goodbye, Mr. Ed"	Bowie, Hunt Sales, Tony Sales	17 February 1992 in Tokyo	3:31
7.	"Heaven's in Here"	Bowie	27 or 29 November 1991 in New York	12:05
8.	"You Belong in Rock n' Roll"		7 December 1991 in Chicago	6:59
Total length:				47:17

== Personnel ==
According to biographer Nicholas Pegg:

Musicians

- David Bowie – vocals, guitar, saxophone
- Reeves Gabrels – lead guitar, backing vocals
- Hunt Sales – drums, percussion, vocals
- Tony Sales – bass, backing vocals
- Eric Schermerhorn – guitar, backing vocals

Producers

- Reeves Gabrels
- Max Bisgrove
- Tom Dubé
- Dave Bianco
- David Bowie

== Concert video ==
Bowie hired Austrian directors Rudi Dolezal and Hannes Rossacher to film a concert video during the It's My Life Tour. It was shot at a single show at The Docks, Hamburg on 24 October 1991. It intersperses concert footage with fans and backstage banter and features both monochrome and colour segments. The video runtime is 88 minutes and was distributed by PolyGram in the UK. Pegg notes the video as a substantial improvement over the live album, showcasing more enjoyment for the viewer, although he notes that it offers "the best and worst" of the band's live performances.

All tracks are written by David Bowie and Reeves Gabrels except where noted.

No.	Title	Writer(s)	Length
1.	"Bus Stop"
2.	"Sacrifice Yourself"	Bowie, Hunt Sales, Tony Sales
3.	"Goodbye Mr. Ed""	Bowie, Hunt Sales, Tony Sales
4.	"I Can't Read"
5.	"Baby Universal"
6.	"You Can't Talk"
7.	"Go Now"	Larry Banks, Milton Bennett
8.	"Under The God"	Bowie
9.	"Betty Wrong"
10.	"Stateside"	Bowie, Hunt Sales
11.	"I've Been Waiting For You"	Neil Young
12.	"You Belong in Rock n' Roll"
13.	"One Shot"	Bowie, Gabrels, Hunt Sales, Tony Sales
14.	"If There Is Something"	Bryan Ferry
15.	"Heaven's In Here"	Bowie
16.	"Amlapura"
17.	"Crack City"	Bowie, Gabrels, Hunt Sales, Tony Sales
