= G.I. Orange =

- Origin: St Albans, UK
- Genres: New Wave, pop
- Years active: 1983–1990
- Labels: EMI
- Past members: Karl Whitworth; Simon Whitworth; Mark Whitworth; Gary Holt
- Website: G.I. Orange

G.I. Orange was a British New Wave and pop band, formed in the mid-1980s by the brothers Karl Whitworth (lead vocals and guitar), Simon Whitworth (bass guitar and vocals), and Mark Whitworth (keyboard and vocals), plus Gary Holt (drum and vocals). They had their biggest success in Japan, where they released an album and a number of EPs and singles.

== History ==
The band formed in 1983 in St Albans, and toured the UK supporting Bucks Fizz and David Essex. They came to the attention of Nonaka Norio and were signed to EMI for £5,000, to promote them as "Japanese 'Western Music'". In 1985 the singles "Fight Away the Lover" and "Psychic Magic" were released in Japan, with the latter spending 14 weeks in the Oricon Chart, peaking at number 35. The former single was also released in the UK, but received underwhelming critical reception in Smash Hits magazine. They released their eponymous album (also called Psychic Magic), produced by Tim Palmer, which entered the Japanese charts at number 20 in August 1985. The album was followed-up by a national tour starting in the city of Kumamoto. While G.I. Orange did achieve some success and a following in Japan, including ¥8 million in royalties, it was not sufficient to warrant a second album.

In 1990, the members of G.I. Orange agreed to go their separate ways to follow individual projects. As of 2010 Karl Whitworth was still involved with music, teaching in Hertfordshire. Simon Whitworth is an author and songwriter, living on the Isle of Wight. The band returned to Japan in 2015, performing live dates in Tokyo for their 30th anniversary. In 2016 Karl Whitworth and Gary Holt reformed the band for live gigs and to release new music.
