= TV Eye Live 1977 =

Live album by Iggy Pop
- Released: May 1978
- Recorded: March 21, 22 & 28, 1977 October 26, 1977
- Genre: Hard rock; punk rock
- Length: 36:01
- Label: RCA
- Producer: Iggy Pop, David Bowie

Iggy Pop chronology
Kill City (1977)	TV Eye Live 1977 (1978)	New Values (1979)

Singles from TV Eye Live 1977
- 1. "I Got a Right" Released: 1978

Professional ratings
Review scores
Source	Rating
AllMusic	1.5/5 stars
Christgau's Record Guide	C+
Encyclopedia of Popular Music	2/5 stars
The Rolling Stone Album Guide	2/5 stars
Tom Hull – on the Web	B−

TV Eye Live 1977 (or simply TV Eye) is a live album by the American musician Iggy Pop originally released in 1978. Iggy took a $90,000 advance from RCA Records to finish his contract with a live album. According to AllMusic, the album was assembled from soundboard tapes. Iggy Pop doctored them in a German studio, quickly and cheaply for around $5,000. The album features recordings from concerts on March 21 and 22, 1977, at the Agora in Cleveland, Ohio; on March 28, 1977, at the Aragon in Chicago, Illinois; and on October 26, 1977, at the Uptown Theater in Kansas City, Missouri.

The album is notable for the presence of David Bowie on keyboards and background vocals for selected tracks and the rather crushing bass and drum sound; also, with the Sales brothers, the lineup prefigures in part Bowie's Tin Machine lineup.

== Track listing ==
1. "T.V. Eye" [sic] (Iggy Pop, Ron Asheton) – 4:24
2. "Funtime" (Iggy Pop, David Bowie) – 3:20
3. "Sixteen" (Iggy Pop) – 3:56
4. "I Got a Right" (Iggy Pop) – 4:29
5. "Lust for Life" (Iggy Pop, David Bowie) – 4:01
6. "Dirt" (Iggy Pop) – 5:19
7. "Nightclubbing" (Iggy Pop, David Bowie) – 6:16
8. "I Wanna Be Your Dog" (Iggy Pop, Ron Asheton) – 4:16

== Personnel ==
- Iggy Pop – vocals
- David Bowie – piano and synthesizers (on tracks 1, 2, 6 & 8)
- Ricky Gardiner – guitar (on tracks 1, 2, 6 & 8)
- Stacey Heydon – guitar (on tracks 3, 4, 5 & 7)
- Scott Thurston – guitar, piano, harmonica, synthesizer (on tracks 3, 4, 5 & 7)
- Tony Sales – bass guitar
- Hunt Sales – drums

Technical

- Eduard Meyer – engineer
- Barney Wan – art direction
- Jan Michael Alejandro – tech, road crew
- Vern "Moose" Constan – tech, road crew
- Robert Joyce – tech, road crew

== Charts ==
Chart (1978)	Peak position
Australian Albums (Kent Music Report)	89
