= I Can't Read =

Song by David Bowie

Single by David Bowie

from the album Tin Machine and the soundtrack The Ice Storm
- Released: 1 December 1997
- Recorded: August 1996
- Length: 4:40 (short version); 5:30 (long version)
- Label: Velvel Records/ZYX (ZYX 8757-8)
- Songwriters: David Bowie; Reeves Gabrels
- Producers: David Bowie; Mark Plati; Reeves Gabrels

David Bowie singles chronology
"I'm Afraid of Americans" (1997)	"I Can't Read" (1997)	"Thursday's Child" (1999)

Music video
- "I Can't Read '97" by David Bowie on YouTube

Audio
- "I Can't Read '97" (long version) by David Bowie on YouTube

"I Can't Read" is a song written by David Bowie and Reeves Gabrels for Tin Machine on their debut album in 1989. The song was subsequently re-recorded by Bowie and Gabrels together in 1996, and performed live during Bowie's concerts in the late 1990s.

== Background ==
Bowie described the song as "full of remorse and agony, I expect, it's when jobs go wrong, and home doesn't really feel warm any more, and you don't need anybody – you don't even pretend you do – and you end up in this kind of state."

Bowie recorded two new versions of the song in 1996, one for the film The Ice Storm and a different version for inclusion on his album Earthling (1997), although this latter version was never released until its inclusion on Is It Any Wonder? (2020). The Ice Storm version was released as a single in Germany and Scandinavia by Velvel Records in December 1997. In January 1998 it was also released in Australia by Shock Records under exclusive license from Velvel Records. The single stayed in the UK Top 200 for 3 weeks, peaking at No. 73.

== Track listing ==
The 1996's rerecording was Bowie’s preferred solo version, but it was ultimately cut from Earthling by him to be replaced at the last minute with "The Last Thing You Should Do".

An alternative version of that discarded rerecording, differentiated by featuring minor chords and a darker sound for the chorus, was worked for The Ice Storm film. The full length version of that reworking appeared on a single in 1997, while an edit featured on the film’s soundtrack album.

Finally in 2020, the early Earthling version was released in the Is It Any Wonder? EP.

=== 1997 I Can't Read (Single) CD: Velvel/ZYX 8757-8 (Germany) ===
1. "I Can't Read" (Short Version) (Bowie, Gabrels) – 4:40
2. "I Can't Read" (Long Version) (Bowie, Gabrels) – 5:30
3. "This Is Not America" (Bowie, Metheny) – 3:48

=== 2020 Is It Any Wonder? (EP) CD: Parlophone/ISO Records DBCD 80120 0190295301378 (Worldwide) ===
1. "Baby Universal '97" (Bowie, Gabrels) - 3:14
2. "Fun (Clownboy mix)" (Bowie, Gabrels) - 3:12
3. "Stay '97" (Bowie) - 7:32
4. "I Can't Read '97" (Bowie, Gabrels) - 5:27
5. "Nuts" (Bowie, Gabrels, Plati) - 5:22
6. "The Man Who Sold The World (Live Eno Mix)" (Bowie) - 3:35

== Live versions ==
A performance from 25 June 1989 was released on the 12" and CD version of the single "Tin Machine" (1989). Another live version recorded during Tin Machine's 1991 It's My Life Tour was released on the live album Tin Machine Live: Oy Vey, Baby (1992), and a final version recorded in 1999 by Bowie and Gabrels, but without the other members of Tin Machine, was released on VH1 Storytellers (2009).

== Charts ==
Chart (1998)	Peak position
Scotland Singles (OCC)	77
UK Singles (OCC)	73
UK Indie (OCC)	12

== Cover versions ==
- Tim Bowness and Samuel Smiles - Diamond Gods: Interpretations of Bowie (2001)
