= Malice in Wonderland (band) =

Norwegian band

Malice In Wonderland
- Origin: Bergen, Norway
- Genres: Hard rock; Glam metal; Glam rock; Gothic rock
- Years active: 1997–present
- Labels: Crank Music Group; Karisma Records; Dark Essence Records
- Members: Chri$ Wicked; Tracy Loveless; Sid Silva; Ed Kelly

Malice in Wonderland is a Norwegian rock band.

== Biography ==
Malice in Wonderland was founded in the late 1990s.

Their self-titled debut album was released in Norway on Karisma Records/Dark Essence Records in 2005 and abroad the following year. The lead single "Lucifer's Town" became an internet hit and had more than 1 million plays on Myspace. Malice In Wonderland released several singles, amongst them City Angel, mixed by Tim Palmer (U2, Ozzy Osbourne) which was listed on Finnish radio.

They have toured in Europe and Asia, played with renowned artists like Def Leppard and appeared on several TV-shows and productions.

December 20, 2013 Malice In Wonderland released their last album "The Royal Brigade". The album is mixed by John Fryer (Depeche Mode, Nine Inch Nails).

August 15 2015 the band announced that they are breaking up and in the following months they did several farewell shows in Norway and abroad.

Chris Wicked later announced that he will work under his own name, singing in Norwegian. March 2018 he released a single called "Bare Deg og Meg og Natten".

== Discography ==
=== Albums ===
Name	Release date	Track list	Comments
Malice In Wonderland	July 28, 2005	1. Lucifer's Town 4:33 (Wicked); 2. Devil Dance 4:04 (Wicked/Foxx); 3. My Heart (Belongs To You) 6:03 (Wicked); 4. Perfect Drug 4:43 (Wicked); 5. In The End 3:09 (Wicked/Valentine); 6. Heartache Boulevard 4:42 (Wicked); 7. Red Rose Suicide 5:39 (Foxx/Wicked); 8. Dancing With You 3:59 (Wicked); 9. Nightclub, sin & decadence 4:57 (Wicked); 10. I Love To 8:04 (Wicked)	Produced: Malice In Wonderland; Label: ℗ Karisma Records; Mixing: Valentine, Wicked & Geir Satre; Engineered: Jorn H. Eriksson and Andy Valentine; Recorded and mixed: Futurerevisited Studios; Additional Musicians: Female Vocals: Idun Moe, Hanne Tangstad, Karina Bjornes; Backing Vocals: Marc Farrano, Bennech Lyngboe; Cello: Mattias J. Monsen; Violin: Cecilie Kaiser; Saxophone: Siri Andersen
The Royal Brigade	December 10, 2013	1. Diamonds; 2. Black Wings; 3. Live For Today; 4. Moonchild; 5. The Royal Brigade; 6. New Year’s Eve; 7. Like The Desert Miss The Rain; 8. Tenebrous Lane; 9. Darkened Soul; 10. Have No Fear; 11. A Tear And A Whisper	Produced: Malice In Wonderland; Label: @ Crank Music Group; Mixing: John Fryer; Engineered: Recorded and mixed: Additional Musicians: Backing Vocals: Marc Farrano

=== Singles ===
Name	Release date	Track list	Comments
A Tear & A Whisper	September 22, 2008	1. A Tear and A Whisper (4:18)	Digital Single
City Angel	November 25, 2009	1. City Angel (2:32); 2. City Angel (acoustic version) (2:45)	Label: ℗ Scandal Music Finland Oy; Mixing: Tim Palmer
Live for Today/New Year's Eve	July 1, 2013	1. Live for Today (3:38); 2. New Year's Eve (3:31); 3. The devil May Care (3:50)	Digital single: Label: ℗ 2013 Malice in Wonderland; Mixing: John Fryer
Black Wings	November 28, 2013	1. Black Wings	Digital single: Label: ℗ 2013 Crank Music Group; Mixing: John Fryer

=== Unofficial works ===
Name	Release date	Track list	Comments
Reduced To A Low Condition (EP)	1998	1. Because; 2. Angel Carved In Water; 3. Agenda; 4. Something I Can't Touch; 5. Never Again	
Vicious Girl (EP)	1999	1. No Words...; 2. Vicious Girl; 3. ...no Meaning; 4. Cruel (live); 5. Unreal (live); 6. 24 Hours* (live); 7. Angel 2 (live)	
Sin & Decadence (EP)	2002	1. Nightclub, sin & decadence (5:05); 2. Dancing With You (4:27); 3. I love to (6:34); 4. My Heart Belongs to You (5:23)	Produced by: MIW

==== Live covers ====
- The Rolling Stones – "Gimme Shelter"
- Midnight Oil – "Beds Are Burning"
- Guns N' Roses – "My Michelle"
- Lenny Kravitz – "Are You Gonna Go My Way"
- Jace Everett – "Bad Things"
- VNV Nation – "Illusion"
- Depeche Mode – "Enjoy the Silence"

==== Studio covers ====
- London After Midnight – Sacrifice (Demo Home-studio)
- The Cult – Rain (Demo Rough Mix)
- Stage Dolls – Love Cries (Wings of Steel – a Norwegian Tribute to Stage Dolls)
- Rauli Badding Somerjoki – Tähdet Tähdet [Stars]

==== Chris Wicked's collaborations ====
- The Pleasures – Boy Next Door (Greatest Hits 2006) Backing Vocals
- Pyro All Stars – Talk Dirty to Me (Poison) (Live at Club Hulen, Bergen, 22/09/2006) [Radio Show Pyro (NRK P3)] Lead Singer
- Mama Trash All Stars Band – Lil' Devil (The Cult) (2012/Oct/06, Gloria, Helsinki, Trash Fest) Lead Singer & Tracy on lead guitars
- Faith Circus – Strutter (Kiss) (2012/Nov/10) Lead Vocals
- Mama Trash All Stars Band – Personal Jesus (Depeche Mode) (2013/Oct/05, Gloria, Helsinki, Trash Fest) Lead Singer
- Mama Trash All Stars Band – White Wedding (Billy Idol) (2013/Oct/05, Gloria, Helsinki, Trash Fest)
- Latexxx Teens – Warriors – (2013/Oct/05, Gloria, Helsinki, Trash Fest) Guest vocals feat. Chris Harms

== Members ==
=== Current members ===
Name	Instrument	Period	Other Bands
Chris Wicked (Chris Wollertsen)	Vocals	1997 –	Cult Of Catharsis
Tracy Loveless (Tore Grindheim)	Guitars	2004 –	The Entity
Sid Silva (Egil Salvesen)	Bass	2010 –	Mollygogo
Ed Kelly (Eskil Sæter)	Drums	2011 –	Lucky Lew

=== Former members ===
Name	Instrument	Period	Other Bands
Tommi Gun (Tor Helge Gjengedal)	Drums	1999–2010	Vulture Industries
Andy Valentine (Anders Vaage)	Guitar, Bass & Synthesizer	2003–2008	The Entity, John Martyr & The Messengers
Eric Black (Eirik Bratland)	Bass	1997–2006	–
Rob Cruel (Ruben Gentekos)	Synthesizer	2003–2005	Apostasy, Opus Forgotten, Chaos Predicted
Rikki Foxx (Rune Pedersen)	Guitar	1997–2004	–
Paul Prozac (Pål Ferstad)	Vocals & Guitar	1997–2001	Repomen, Team Blitzkrieg

=== Session members ===
Name	Instrument	Period	Other bands
Stian Johannesen	Drums	1998 (RLC demo)	2nd Awakening, Deathcon, Chaos Predicted
Håkon Bergstad	Drums	1998 (RLC demo)	66 Crusher
Einar Selvik (Kvitrafn)	Drums	1999 (VG demo)	Wardruna, Gorgoroth, Det Hedenske Folk, Bak De Syv Fjell
Radomir Michael Nemec (Lava Radek)	Guitar	2002 (live member)	Aeternus, Taake, Amok, Dead To This World
Øyvind Madsen	Synthesizer	2002 (1 gig only), 2005 (live member)	Sulphur, 2nd Awakening, DRG, Enslaved, Black Hole Generator, Vulture Industries
Janto Garmannslund	Bass	2008–2009 (live member)	Bourbon Flame, Hades Almighty
