= Tin Machine =

British–American rock band

- Tin Machine in 1991; Left to right: Reeves Gabrels, Tony Fox Sales, Hunt Sales and David Bowie

Background information
- Genres: Rock; hard rock
- Years active: 1988–1992
- Labels: EMI; Victory Music
- Past members: David Bowie; Reeves Gabrels; Tony Fox Sales; Hunt Sales

Tin Machine were a British–American rock band formed in 1988. The band consisted of English singer-songwriter David Bowie on lead vocals, saxophone and guitar; Reeves Gabrels on guitar and vocals; Tony Fox Sales on bass and vocals; and Hunt Sales on drums and vocals. The Sales brothers had previously performed with Bowie and Iggy Pop during the 1977 tour for The Idiot. Kevin Armstrong played additional guitar and keyboards on the band's first and second studio albums and first tour, and American guitarist Eric Schermerhorn played on the second tour and live album Tin Machine Live: Oy Vey, Baby (1992).

Hunt Sales said that the band's name "reflects the sound of the band", and Bowie stated that he and his band members joined up "to make the kind of music that we enjoyed listening to", and to rejuvenate himself artistically.

The band recorded two studio albums and one live album before dissolving in 1992, after which Bowie returned to his solo career. By the end of 2012, they had sold two million albums. Bowie said Tin Machine helped revitalise his career.

== History ==
=== 1987–1988: Band genesis ===
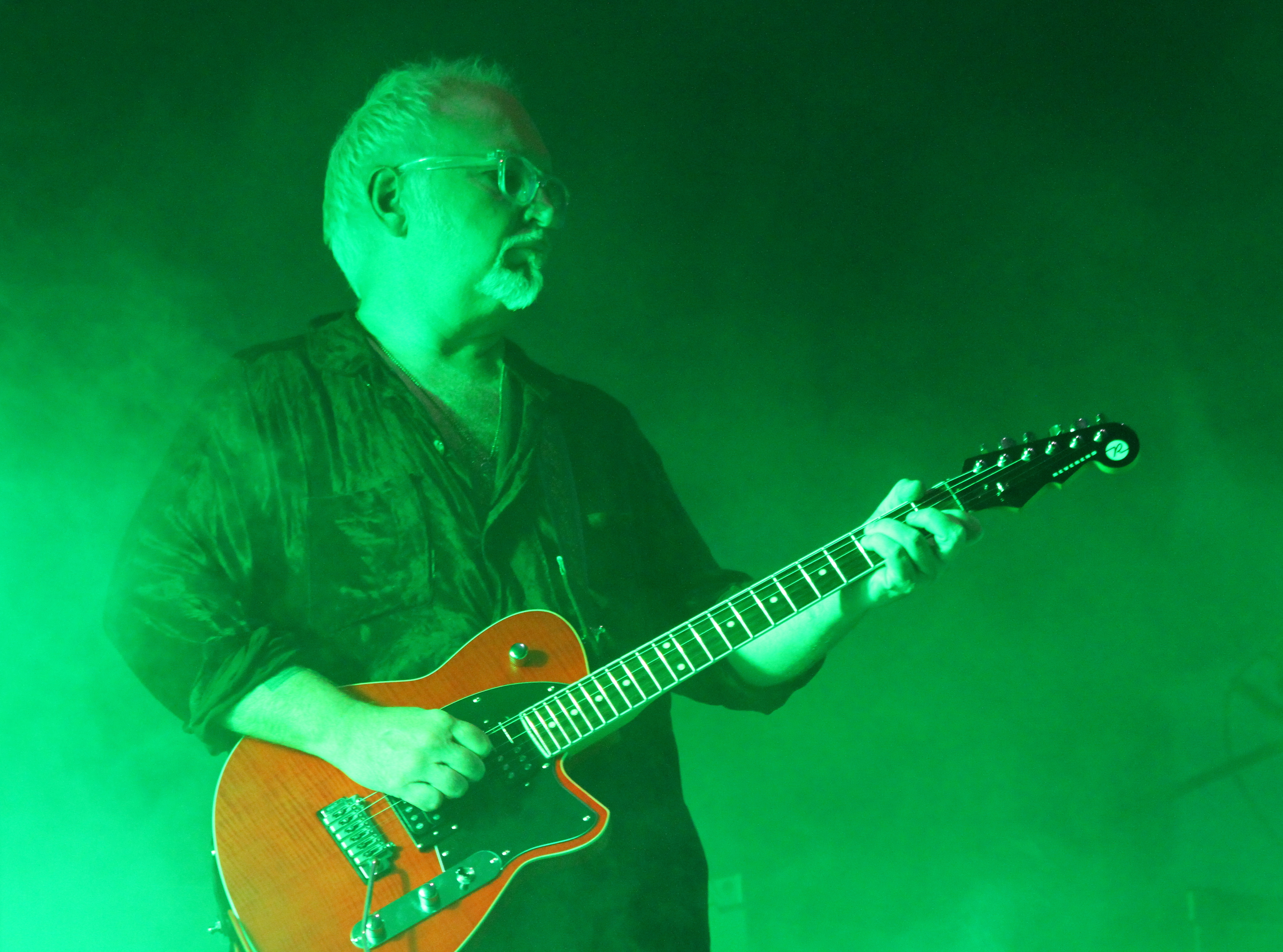
Reeves Gabrels in 2012

The 1987 Bowie album Never Let Me Down and subsequent Glass Spider Tour had left critics unimpressed, and Bowie was aware of his low standing. Eager to return to making music for himself rather than the mainstream audience he had acquired following the Let's Dance album, Bowie looked around for collaborators. He briefly worked with Bon Jovi producer Bruce Fairbairn in Los Angeles, recording a few tracks, including a demo of "Lucy Can't Dance" (which was eventually re-recorded and released on Bowie's 1993 solo album Black Tie White Noise) and a version of Bob Dylan's song "Like A Rolling Stone", but this did not bear much fruit, and the Dylan cover was passed to his friend Mick Ronson, where it was released on his posthumous album Heaven and Hull (1994). Soon after, Bowie began collaborating with Reeves Gabrels, who pushed the singer to rediscover his experimental side.

Bowie and Gabrels initially met through Gabrels' then-wife Sara Terry, who was part of the press staff for the North American leg of Bowie's 1987 Glass Spider world tour. The two men struck up a friendship when Gabrels visited at several tour venues. Their relationship began as a social one, as Gabrels did not mention that he himself was a musician. Common interests in popular culture and the visual arts provided more than enough to talk about, Gabrels explained in later interviews, and also because he was in his wife's workplace, he felt it was not appropriate to bring up his own music. At the tour's end, Bowie kindly asked Terry if he could do anything for her. In response, Terry gave Bowie a tape of Gabrels' guitar playing. Months later, after listening to the tape, Bowie phoned Gabrels to invite him to get together to play and write. Bowie told him that he felt he had "lost his vision" and was looking for ways to get it back. After a month working together, Gabrels asked Bowie what he wanted of him, and, according to Gabrels, Bowie said "Basically, I need somebody that can do a combination of Beck, Hendrix, Belew and Fripp, with a little Stevie Ray Vaughan and Albert King thrown in. Then, when I’m not singing, you take the ball and do something with it, and when you hand the ball back to me, it might not even be the same ball."

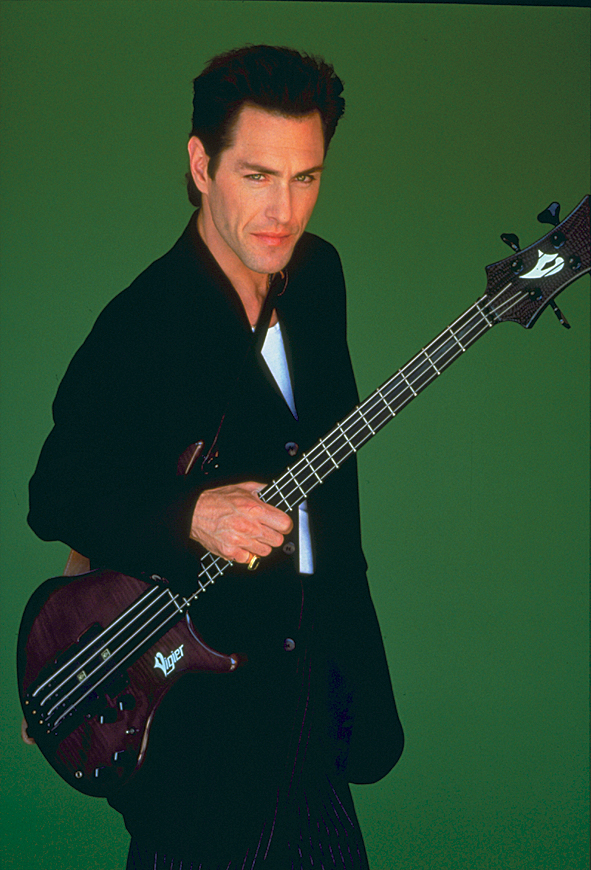
Tony Sales in an undated picture

The first public fruits of Bowie and Gabrels working together came with a new arrangement by Gabrels of the song "Look Back in Anger" which Bowie had written with Brian Eno in 1979 for the album Lodger. The occasion was a benefit show at London's Institute of Contemporary Arts (ICA) on 1 July 1988 at which Bowie had been invited to perform with the avant-garde dance troupe La La La Human Steps. Bowie sang, played and danced with troupe members while in lighted grottoes upstage three musicians (Gabrels on guitar, Kevin Armstrong on guitar, and Erdal Kızılçay on bass) played the new 7 1/2 minute score that Gabrels created from the three-minute song; the new material included drums programmed by Kızılçay. "We went into the studio to rearrange it", said Bowie in a filmed interview; "I like the hard-edged wall of guitar sound that we put into it."

Gabrels recalled that early on, they were not sure whom they would work with. They discussed working with Terry Bozzio on drums and Percy Jones on bass. But Bowie, who had run into Tony Sales in Los Angeles at a wrap party for his Glass Spider Tour, convinced Tony to call his brother Hunt so they could work together again, as Tony and Hunt had performed with David Bowie in support of Iggy Pop in the late 1970s. Tony recalled that Bowie was "thinking about getting a band together — something together. He didn't know exactly what he wanted to do, but he wanted Hunt and I to meet Reeves and maybe we could all write together, come up with something."

Bowie himself was surprised with how things came together with the band:

I'd never wanted to be in a band until we got together. And as we were getting together, it wasn't really occurring to me that this is what I wanted to do. It took a week or so of actually being in the studio and working, and then I think we fully realized the potential, musically, for what we were doing and wanted to stick with it. I was quite happy to go off and make a solo album. I was quite excited about a couple of things I was doing, which I brought into the band and which were irrevocably changed. But that's the nature of the band.

"Their attitude was kind of, 'He's David Bowie, we're the Sales brothers, who the fuck are you?'"

— Reeves Gabrels, on how the group bonded when they first came together

Bowie was pleased that the band members clicked, calling the ease at which the personalities came together "inspired guesswork". Hunt and Tony, the two sons of comic Soupy Sales, kept the mood jovial during recording sessions and interviews. Bowie later rejected the idea that Reeves, Hunt and Tony were backing members of his band. "The Sales brothers would never accept having another boss. They are far too stubborn and aware of their own needs. They're not in the market to be anybody's backing band, either of them. You do not fuck with the Sales brothers, or Reeves Gabrels." Gabrels said that Bowie came in one day while the group was first forming and said, "I think this has got to be a band. Everybody's got input. Everybody's writing. You guys don't listen to me anyway." The band split profits four ways, no one was on a salary and each member paid for his own expenses. Bowie also clarified that "the band will cease to exist the moment it ceases to be a musical experience for any of us. None of us wanted to get into the kind of situation where you find yourself making albums because you're contracted to." The group setup allowed Bowie a certain level of anonymity, and to that end, Bowie stipulated that all four members divide interviews equally between them and that in the cases where he was interviewed, that another member of the band be present as well. He made a point to clarify that he did not invite the others to join "his" band, rather, "the band literally came together."

The Sales brothers moved the tone of the sessions away from art-rock and more towards hard rock, and Bowie looked to one of his favorite bands at the time, Pixies, for inspiration. The Sales brothers heckled Bowie into greater spontaneity, with most songs recorded in one take, and lyrics left unpolished, thus giving the band a ragged, punk rock edge. On tour, Bowie said of the band and its music, "This is not music to get up and have breakfast to by any means. And we're not the most comfortable band in the world to watch. If you're looking for a dance band, we ain't it."

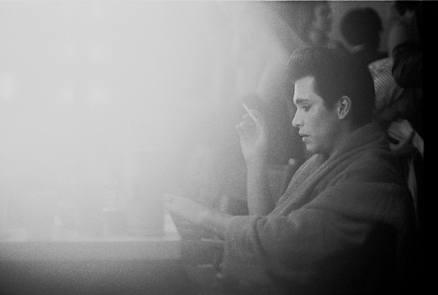
Hunt Sales in 1981

In contemporary interviews, the band said their musical influences were Gene Krupa, Charlie Mingus, Jimi Hendrix, Glenn Branca, Mountain, Cream, and the Jeff Beck Group.

According to Bowie, the group decided when they formed that they would play from album to album, and that "if we were still getting on with each other – which was the priority – that we'd continue."

==== Band name ====
The group chose the name Tin Machine after one of the songs they had written. Tony Sales joked that, as all four members were divorced when the band formed, originally the band was going to be called "The Four Divorcés" or "Alimony Inc." Gabrels suggested calling the band "White Noise", but Bowie dismissed it as too "racist". Other names that were considered and discarded included "Leather Weasel" and "The Emperor's New Clothes". Gabrels later elaborated on the real name choice, saying the band's name "worked on a number of levels for us. The archaic – the idea of tin, which is still everywhere: tin cans, when you go to the supermarket; when you walk down the street you find rusting tin. It's such a supposedly archaic material, but it's everywhere. Sort of like the idea of us playing this music and not using drum machines and sequencers and things like that. There's a point at which it connects. At least for us. And the final thing, for lack of a better name."

=== 1988–1989: First album and tour ===
The band's self-titled first album was recorded in late 1988 and early 1989. It produced mixed but generally positive reviews upon release in May 1989, picking up favourable comparisons with Bowie's two more recent solo albums. Commercially, the album initially sold well, reaching No. 3 in the UK Albums Chart, but sales quickly tailed off. Gabrels claimed in 1991 that album sales from the first album were "ten times better" than he had anticipated. At the time of the release of the album, Bowie was enthusiastic about the band and the work they'd done, and felt that band had in them "another two albums at least."

Contrary to common reports, the band's first live performance together wasn't at the International Rock Awards Show on 31 May 1989. Prior to that show, the band played an unannounced show in Nassau. Bowie recalled "We showed up at a club in Nassau where we were recording and did four or five songs. We went down to the club and just did 'em." Added Gabrels, "We just walked up on stage and you could hear all these voices whispering, 'That's David Bowie! No, it can't be David Bowie, he's got a beard!'"

The band recognized that some fans and critics didn't like Bowie's new role in the band. Said Tony Sales, "Mainly, people are pissed off because David's not doing 'David Bowie.'" Bowie confirmed that Tin Machine live shows would be "non-theatrical" in contrast to his Glass Spider Tour (his most recent tour).

The band undertook a low-key tour in small venues between 14 June and 3 July 1989, before further recording sessions in Sydney, Australia. During these sessions Tin Machine contributed to a surfing compilation album, Beyond the Beach, with "Needles on the Beach", a new instrumental song. A partial recording of their show from this tour recorded at La Cigale in Paris on 25 June 1989 was released digitally in August 2019.

=== 1990–1991: Second album and tour ===
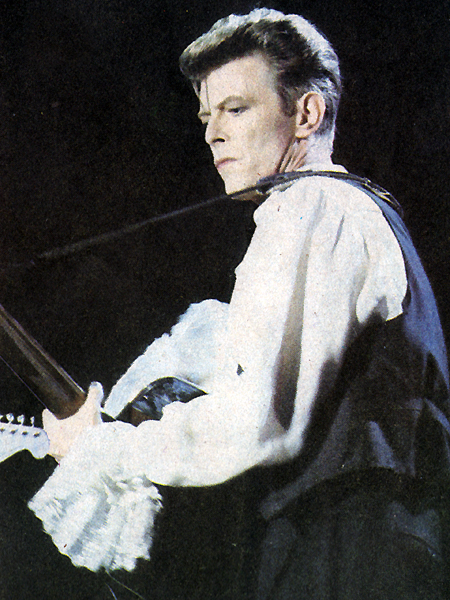
David Bowie during his Sound+Vision Tour in 1990

The group went on hiatus for most of 1990 while Bowie conducted his solo Sound+Vision Tour, which lasted through September, and then went straight into filming his role for the film The Linguini Incident (1991). Gabrels worked on some tracks during the year, occasionally catching up with Bowie on tour during Bowie's days off and recording guitar solos on his own in the studio. In December 1990, Bowie split from EMI; Hunt Sales said that EMI "kind of freaked out a little bit at the strident, single-less Tin Machine debut", which partially explained why Bowie switched music labels. In March 1991, the band signed to Victory Music, a new label launched by JVC and distributed worldwide by London Records and PolyGram, and recorded more new material. This was combined with tracks from the Sydney sessions to form the Tin Machine II album. The album was described as "just as impure and twisted [as their first album], but more R&B and less abrasive." Gabrels explained the change between the first and second album was because by the second album, "we knew one another as musicians. ... It wasn't as dense. And we actually left more room, I think for David to come up with some interesting melodies. There was more room for vocals on this record."

In late 1991 Bowie reiterated that he was still happy being in the band during that time, stating "I'm content. … I'm deriving a great deal of fulfillment from working with Tin Machine", and band-mate Gabrels agreed, saying "we're doing exactly what we wanted to do." During press performances for songs on the album, Gabrels played his guitar with a vibrator and for a performance on BBC's Top of the Pops, who banned the use of the vibrator, he mimed playing his guitar with a chocolate éclair.

In early August 1991, the band began promotional performances for the album, starting with TV appearances in the UK. From 5 October 1991 to 17 February 1992, the group went on their It's My Life Tour, which was a longer tour than their first. The band was joined on this tour by guitarist Eric Schermerhorn. On 23 November 1991, the band was the musical guest during Saturday Night Live's 17th season.

=== 1992: Live album and dissolution ===
Tracks from the "It's My Life" tour were released on the July 1992 album Tin Machine Live: Oy Vey, Baby. The album did not sell well and there was speculation that the failure of this album to achieve commercial success was among the reasons that the band ultimately broke up. As early as 1990, Bowie knew he'd be going back to solo work, although not because he disliked working with the band, saying "I have very definite ideas of what I want to do as a solo artist, which I'll be starting on probably late next year [1991], again completely different, hopefully, from what I've done before." In the middle of 1992, around the time of the release of Oy Vey, Baby, the band submitted their cover version "Go Now" to the NME compilation album Ruby Trax (released in November 1992) and Bowie returned to solo recording with his single "Real Cool World" while maintaining intentions to return to the studio with Tin Machine in 1993 for a third album. These plans would fail to come to fruition, however, and the band shortly thereafter dissolved; there were allegations that Hunt Sales' growing drug addiction was responsible for the band's end, but of Tin Machine's dissolution, Bowie merely said "personal problems within the band became the reason for its demise. It’s not for me to talk about them, but it became physically impossible for us to carry on. And that was pretty sad really."

== Band legacy ==
The band earned mixed reviews during their short career. Starting in the late 1990s, critics reappraised the band more warmly and Tin Machine were found to have been "unjustly" harshly reviewed. One critic suggested that part of the reason for its poor reception was that Tin Machine's music was somewhat ahead of its time, and that the band "explored alternative and grunge before the styles were even widely known to exist." Another critic agreed, with yet another suggesting that Tin Machine and Bowie were "merely ahead of the curve. A prophet, a voice in the desert predicting the coming of Nirvana. At the time, Nirvana was toiling in Seattle obscurity, pushing its debut Bleach on Sub Pop at every dive it played." Tim Palmer, after producing Tin Machine's two studio albums, would go on to mix Pearl Jam's grunge album Ten in 1991, and later recalled to Gabrels that he had come into the studio one day to find Pearl Jam listening to Tin Machine's "Heaven's in Here".

In 1996, Bowie reflected on his time with Tin Machine: "For better or worse it helped me to pin down what I did and didn’t enjoy about being an artist. It helped me, I feel, to recover as an artist. And I do feel that for the past few years I’ve been absolutely in charge of my artistic path again. I’m working to my own criteria. I’m not doing anything I would feel ashamed of in the future, or that I would look back on and say my heart wasn’t in that."

In 1997, when asked if he thought the band was still underrated, Bowie said, "It's going to be interesting, isn't it? As the songs creep out in different forms over the years, I assume that eventually it'll be evaluated in a different way. I'm not sure people will ever be sympathetic to it entirely. But as the years go by, I think they'll be less hostile. I think it was quite a brave band and I think there were some extremely good pieces of work done. And I think they'll kind of show themselves over time." Bowie and Gabrels re-recorded a few Tin Machine tracks during this time, including "I Can't Read" and "Baby Universal", with the former being released on the soundtrack to the movie The Ice Storm (1997) and both as a part of Bowie's posthumous Is It Any Wonder? (2020).

By the end of the 20th century, Bowie looked back at his time with the band as invaluable, saying "I had to kick-start my engine again in music. There'd been a wobbly moment where I could quite easily have gone reclusive and just worked on visual stuff, paint and sculpt and all that. I had made a lot of money: I thought, well, I could just bugger off and do my Gauguin in Tahiti bit now. But then what do you do – re-emerge at 60 somewhere? So I look back on the Tin Machine years with great fondness. They charged me up. I can’t tell you how much."

Despite some reports to the contrary, Bowie stated several times over his years with Tin Machine that he was happy working in the band. Bowie used his time with the band as a way to revitalise himself and his career, which he would later in March 1997 call a "lifeline", citing Reeves Gabrels as a source of his new-found energy and direction:

Reeves took me aside and spent many hours explaining it in very simple terms. 'Stop doing it' was, I think, the key phrase he used. 'Stop doing it.' 'But you know, I've got all these shows I've got to do, and I hate having to do these hits, and ...' 'Stop doing it.' That was essentially the reasoning, which I found extremely complicated to understand at first. And then it dawned on me – he meant stop... doing... it. And I did.

== Personnel ==
- David Bowie – lead vocals, guitars, acoustic guitar, piano, saxophone
- Reeves Gabrels – guitars, backing vocals, acoustic guitar, organ
- Tony Fox Sales – bass, backing vocals
- Hunt Sales – drums, percussion, backing and lead vocals

== Discography ==
=== Studio albums ===
Title	Album details	Peak chart positions									Certifications
Title	Album details	UK	AUS	AUT	GER	NLD	NOR	NZ	SWE	US	Certifications
Tin Machine	Released: 22 May 1989; Label: EMI USA; Formats: LP, CD	3	42	19	13	24	9	14	9	28	BPI: Gold
Tin Machine II	Released: 2 September 1991; Label: London; Formats: LP, CD	23	139	25	56	33	14	—	19	126	
"—" denotes releases that did not chart.

=== Live albums ===
Title	Album details
Tin Machine Live: Oy Vey, Baby	Released: 27 July 1992; Label: London; Formats: LP, CD; Film: Tin Machine Live: Oy Vey, Baby
Tin Machine: Live at La Cigale, Paris, 25 June 1989	Released: 30 August 2019; Label: Parlophone; Formats: DD, streaming

=== Singles ===
Title	Year	Peak chart positions			Album
Title	Year	UK	IRE	US Main. Rock	Album
"Heaven's in Here" (promo only)	1989	—	—	—	Tin Machine
"Under the God"	1989	51	23	8	Tin Machine
"Tin Machine"/"Maggie's Farm (live)"	1989	48	×	×	Tin Machine
"Prisoner of Love"	1989	77	—	—	Tin Machine
"You Belong in Rock 'n' Roll"	1991	33	—	—	Tin Machine II
"Baby Universal"	1991	48	—	21	Tin Machine II
"One Shot"	1991	—	—	17	Tin Machine II
"—" denotes releases that did not chart. "×" denotes single not released in that territory.

=== Other appearances ===
Year	Song(s)	Album	Notes	Ref.
1992	"Go Now"	Ruby Trax		
1993	"Baby Can Dance"	Best of Grunge Rock	Live version recorded in Hamburg on 24 October 1991	
1994	"Needles on the Beach"	Beyond the Beach		

=== Music videos ===
Year	Song title	Director(s)	Notes
1989	"Heaven's in Here"	Julien Temple	unreleased single and video
1989	"Under the God"	Julien Temple	
1989	"Maggie's Farm" (live version)	Julien Temple	
1989	"Prisoner of Love"	Julien Temple	
1991	"You Belong in Rock 'n' Roll"	Julien Temple	
1991	"Baby Universal"	Julien Temple	
1991	"One Shot"	Julien Temple	

=== Music video films ===
Title	Album details
Tin Machine	Director: Julien Temple; Screened: 1989; Unreleased to home video market

=== Live concert films ===
Title	Album details
Oy Vey, Baby – Tin Machine Live at The Docks	Released: 1992; Distributor: PolyGram Video; Format: VHS

== Concert tours ==
- Tin Machine Tour (1989)
- It's My Life Tour (1991–1992)
