= Tin Machine (album) =

- CD edition

Studio album by Tin Machine
- Released: 22 May 1989
- Recorded: August 1988 – mid-1989
- Studios: Mountain (Montreux, Switzerland); Compass Point (Nassau, Bahamas)
- Genres: Rock; hard rock; art rock; noise rock
- Length: 56:49
- Label: EMI America
- Producers: Tin Machine; Tim Palmer

Tin Machine chronology
Tin Machine (1989)	Tin Machine II (1991)

David Bowie chronology
Never Let Me Down (1987)	Tin Machine (1989)	Sound + Vision (1989)

Singles from Tin Machine
- 1. "Under the God" Released: June 1989; 2. "Tin Machine/Maggie's Farm (Live)" Released: September 1989; 3. "Prisoner of Love" Released: October 1989

Alternative cover
- LP edition

Tin Machine is the debut studio album by the Anglo-American hard rock band Tin Machine, released on 22 May 1989 through EMI America Records. The band consisted of the English singer-songwriter David Bowie, the American guitarist Reeves Gabrels and brothers Tony Fox and Hunt Sales on bass and drums, respectively, while Englishman Kevin Armstrong acted as an additional guitarist. The project was spearheaded by Bowie, who felt disconnected in his career by 1987 and looked to reinvent himself. After meeting Gabrels through his Glass Spider Tour, the two agreed to work together and collaborated frequently for the next decade. Bowie hired the Sales brothers, neither of whom he had worked with since the 1970s, after a meeting in Los Angeles, while English producer Tim Palmer was hired to co-produce.

The album was recorded in August 1988 at Mountain Studios in Montreux, Switzerland, and later at Compass Point Studios in Nassau, Bahamas, in the spring of 1989. The sessions were productive despite personality clashes among the members. The tracks were mostly recorded live in few takes, with Bowie improvising lyrics while standing at the microphone, resulting in a predominantly hard rock sound and lyrics discussing world issues and love. Tin Machine named themselves and the album after one of the tracks. Unlike Bowie's previous backing bands, Tin Machine acted as a democratic unit, which was reflected in promotional interviews.

Upon release, the album peaked at number three on the UK Albums Chart, although sales declined quickly. It was accompanied by three singles and a 13-minute long music video containing performances of the tracks. Like its supporting concert tour, Tin Machine received mixed reviews and continues to receive similar assessments from Bowie's biographers, who mainly criticise the lyrics and lack of melodies. Nevertheless, some reviewers noted that the band were exploring grunge and alternative rock styles before those styles became popular. Tin Machine began recording a follow-up album in late 1989 before Bowie embarked on the solo Sound+Vision Tour. Bowie later rerecorded "I Can't Read" during the sessions for his 1997 album Earthling.

== Background ==
More than anything else, I thought I should make as much money as I could, and then quit. I didn't think there was any alternative. I thought I was obviously just an empty vessel and would end up like everyone else, doing these stupid fucking shows, singing 'Rebel Rebel' until I fall over and bleed.

— David Bowie on his career at this time, 1996

By the end of 1987, David Bowie was at an artistic low point. Although he had garnered massive commercial success throughout the 1980s starting with Let's Dance (1983), he later said that the success of the album caused him to hit a creative low point in his career which lasted the next few years. After his follow-up albums Tonight (1984) and Never Let Me Down (1987) were critically dismissed, Bowie began to re-evaluate where he was at in his career; he later dismissed this period as his "Phil Collins years". The Glass Spider Tour had torn away at him, as he found it hard to maintain the stadium rockstar lifestyle. While he considered retiring from music, Bowie decided to completely rejuvenate himself.

One of the first things he did was part ways with his longtime collaborator Carlos Alomar, who had acted as Bowie's bandleader. The biographer David Buckley calls his departure the end of Bowie's tenure as a "pop star". Towards the end of 1987, Bowie conducted some sessions in Los Angeles, California, with members of Bryan Adams' backing band and producer Bruce Fairbairn. The only tracks that came out of the sessions were a demo of "Pretty Pink Rose", an early version of "Lucy Can't Dance" and a cover of Bob Dylan's 1965 hit "Like a Rolling Stone", the last of which was given to Bowie's former Spiders from Mars guitarist Mick Ronson, whose version appeared on his posthumous album Heaven and Hull (1994). According to the biographer Nicholas Pegg, Bowie's style during the sessions was close to what he explored for his next big project.

== Development ==
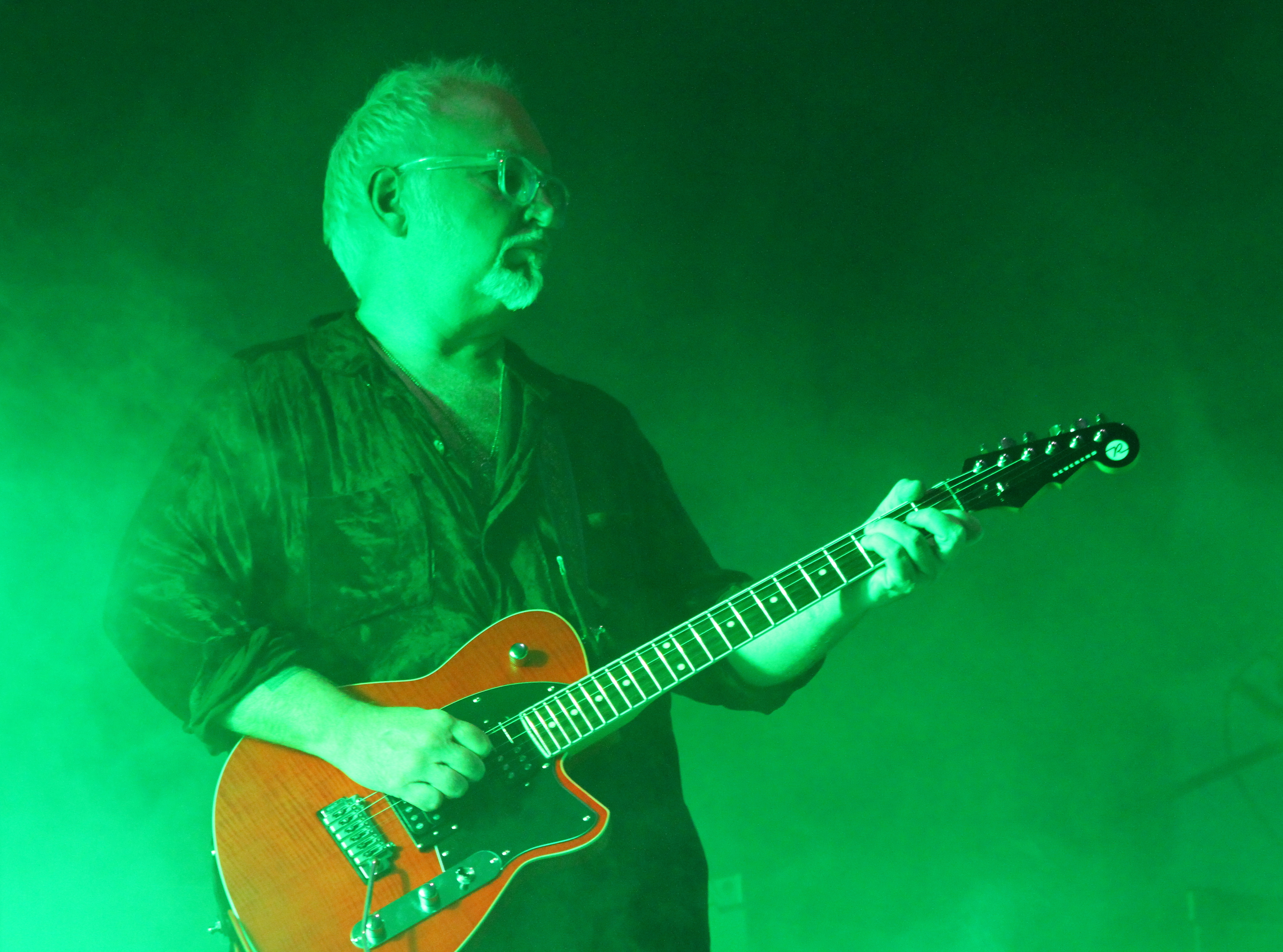
Tin Machine marked the first collaboration between Bowie and guitarist Reeves Gabrels (pictured in 2012), who worked with Bowie for the next decade.

Towards the end of the Glass Spider Tour in November 1987, the tour's American press officer Sarah Gabrels gave Bowie a demo tape containing recordings of her husband Reeves, whom Bowie had unknowingly met and befriended backstage during the American leg; he believed Gabrels was a painter. The demos showcased Gabrels' unique guitar sound, described by the biographer Marc Spitz as "improvisational and multi-note but simultaneously hard and bluesy". He recalled, "It happened really fast. David called me, I went over to Switzerland, and we had this music to do—in a weekend." The beginning of Bowie and Gabrels' collaboration sparked a new journey in Bowie's career. Although there would still be tours and media interviews, he aimed to scale down the expectations of the listening public in terms of his music. Gabrels stated, "He was at a crossroads. Either he became Rod Stewart and played Las Vegas, or he followed his heart." He told Bowie, "The only barrier between you doing what you want and you doing what you think you should do, is you."

One of the first projects Bowie and Gabrels collaborated on was a new version of Bowie's 1979 Lodger track "Look Back in Anger", which was created for a London theatre performance in July 1988. Afterwards, the two returned to Switzerland, where Bowie presented Gabrels with music that he was listening to at the time. These included hard rock acts such as Led Zeppelin, Jimi Hendrix and Buddy Guy, avant-garde acts such as Sonic Youth, and one of Bowie's new favourites, the Pixies. From there, Bowie and Gabrels composed demos for a new project, which included "Bus Stop", "Baby Universal", "Pretty Pink Rose" and an early version of "Under the God".

During a launch party for a Glass Spider Tour video in Los Angeles, Bowie ran into the bassist Tony Fox Sales, whom he hadn't worked with since the recording of Iggy Pop's Lust for Life in 1977. The two reconnected, leading Tony to invite his brother, the drummer Hunt Sales, to a jam session with himself and Bowie. According to Gabrels, the Sales brothers were chosen as the rhythm section so they didn't have "checkbook musicians", specifically wanting former members of a band. Bowie insisted the four form a band, with each member providing equal input. Meanwhile, the positive reaction of the "Look Back in Anger" remix led Bowie to hire the producer Tim Palmer—at the recommendation of the Cult's Billy Duffy—for his next project. Palmer recalled that he was a big fan of Bowie, particularly "the classic albums, but not so much of the later material". He also enjoyed Bowie's working methods, including the encouragement of ideas from all parties involved. Nevertheless, Palmer told Buckley that when he signed on for the project, he assumed it was "a David Bowie record, not a Tin Machine record". Spitz similarly states that Gabrels and the Sales brothers assumed they were assisting Bowie in creating a follow-up for Never Let Me Down rather than forming a band.

== Recording and production ==
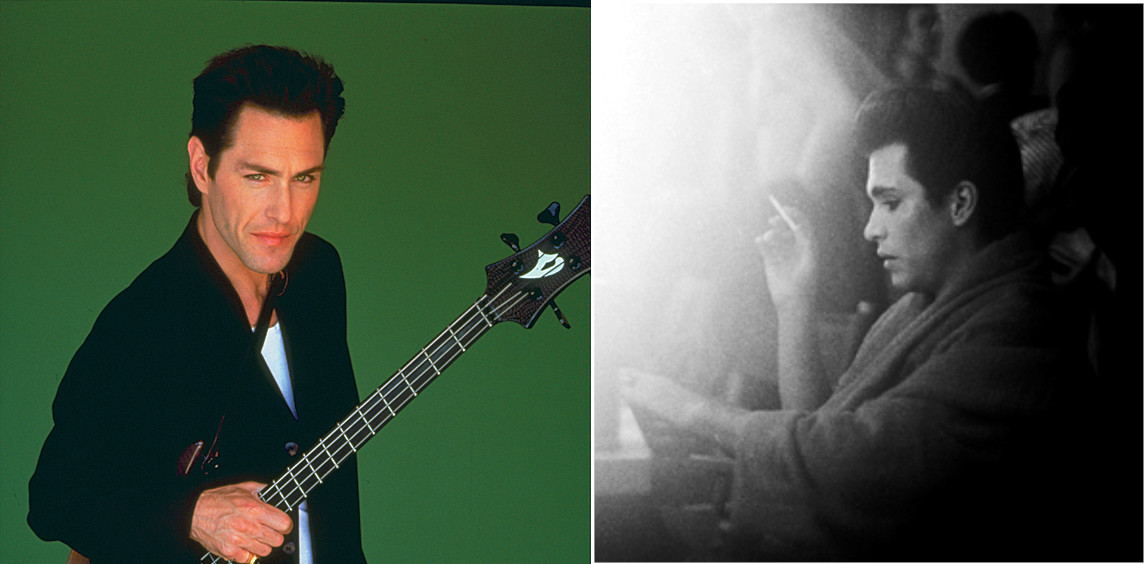
The rhythm section of Tin Machine composed of brothers Tony Fox (left) and Hunt Sales (right) on bass and drums, respectively.

Recording for the new project began at Mountain Studios in Montreux, Switzerland, in August 1988. Bowie and Gabrels spent a week there, writing songs such as "Baby Can Dance", "Pretty Thing" and "Shopping for Girls", before the Sales brothers arrived. Palmer recalled that once they arrived, "all hell broke loose". The brothers had abrasive personalities and, according to the biographer Chris O'Leary, "made it clear they wouldn't be sidemen". Gabrels recalled that the first week of their arrival was the equivalent of "freshman hazing": "all they wanted to do was push me because David was placing a certain amount of trust in me, and I had never done a record that had been released internationally. [Their] attitude was like, 'Well, we all know who we are. Who's this guy?'" Gabrels and Palmer expressed doubts about the project initially. Palmer at first intended to make "the greatest-sounding Bowie album ever" and was disappointed at the different direction taken. Gabrels despised being in a band, calling them "nightmares", further believing bands didn't work as democratic units. Gabrels got fed up with the Sales' attitudes after the first week, choosing to do things his way without their input. Bowie similarly recalled a "strange period of feeling each other out" during the first week.

An addition in the sessions was the guitarist Kevin Armstrong, who had played with Bowie at Live Aid in 1985. In the studio, Hunt Sales arranged his drum set on a riser, which overpowered the room, leaving the guitarists unable to hear themselves play. Armstrong recalled, "He is the loudest drummer I have ever worked with ... I almost went deaf within the first couple of days." Meanwhile, Palmer set up various microphones around the studio in order to capture a live sound. The tracks on the album were recorded raw and live with few overdubs to capture the energy of the band. The other Tin Machine members urged Bowie to avoid re-writing his lyrics: "They were there all the time saying, 'Don't wimp out,' sing like you wrote it ... I have done and frequently do censor myself in terms of lyrics. I say one thing and then I think, 'Ah maybe I'll just take the edge off that a bit." He elaborated, "We wanted to come out of the box with energy, the energy we felt when we were writing and playing. There's very, very little overdubbing on [the album]. For us [it] is our live sound." Bowie was also keen on improvising lyrics while standing at the microphone, which he previously did recording "Heroes" (1977). He primarily sang about the first topics that came to him. Gabrels told Buckley that Tin Machine was recorded digitally, which most people at the time figured could not have been done for the sound they were playing.

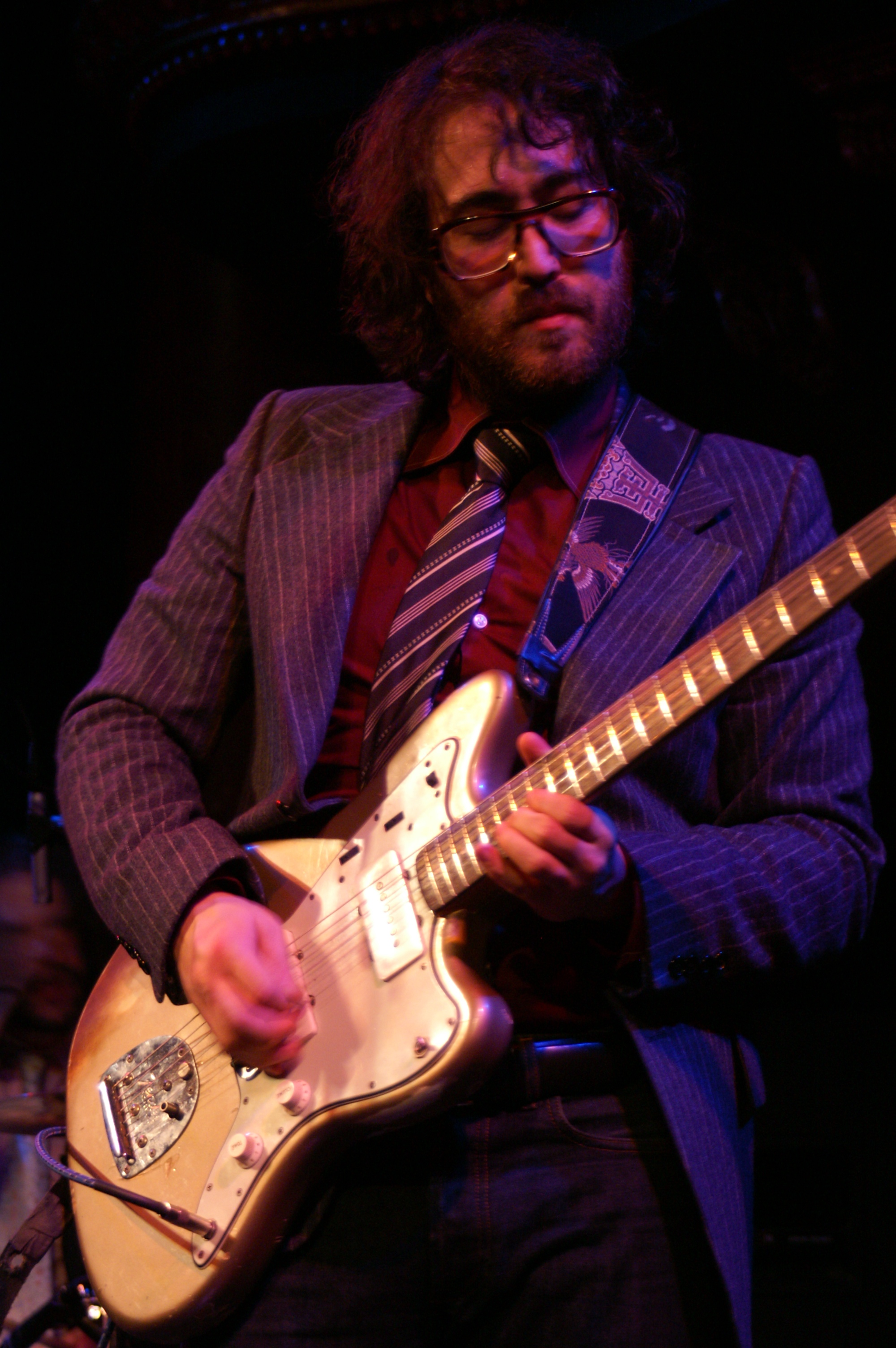
A visit by John Lennon's son Sean in the Bahamas inspired the band to cover his father's 1970 track "Working Class Hero" for Tin Machine.

The first song Tin Machine recorded was "Heaven's in Here", which they wrote from scratch and recorded in their first 30 hours together. This was followed by a cover of Roxy Music's 1972 song "If There Is Something". Bowie stated: "We were so exhausted that we didn't have it in us to write another song, so we used an old song to show how we as a band [approached] someone else's material." The song was left off the album and placed on the band's follow-up. Recording progressed quickly, with Tin Machine sometimes recording one song a day. Gabrels elaborated, "We recorded the songs, overdubbed, and sometimes even mixed them in the same day." After a break in recording, the sessions moved in the spring of 1989 to Compass Point Studios in Nassau, Bahamas, which Palmer recalled as being a completely different environment than Switzerland. There, Bowie resided at Robert Palmer's house on the beach. John Lennon's son Sean visited the band during this time; this encounter inspired them to cover his father's 1970 song "Working Class Hero". Also present in the Bahamas was Bowie's new girlfriend Melissa Hurley, who was one of his backup dancers during the Glass Spider Tour. The band were shocked at the pervasive drug use throughout Nassau, which partly inspired "Crack City". Bowie also claimed his own cocaine-addled past in the mid-1970s served as an inspiration for the track. Tin Machine recorded the track and "I Can't Read" on the same night.

In total, the band recorded 35 songs in just six weeks and all songs were a group effort. In 2017, Gabrels said that the album "could have been a double album" given the amount of material recorded yet not released by them during this period. Armstrong told the author Paul Trynka, "I thought some of the best work didn't make it to the first record. I think David was deliberately trying to go for a fucked-up sound: if it was too safe or polite, he'd dump it." According to Gabrels, there were a few options for potential band names. The band ultimately settled on Tin Machine for both the album and band name, after one of the tracks. Bowie recollected a feeling of indifference: "We really weren't interested in what kind of band name we had, so it was almost arbitrary – ah, let's just pick a song title." The Sales brothers liked Tin Machine as they felt it was reminiscent of the Monkees, "having your own theme song!" Gabrels's suggestion for the title was The Emperor's New Clothes, although he later admitted that "it was a little too much like setting yourself up; giving your critics ammunition".

Bowie enjoyed making Tin Machine, saying, "I'm so up on this I want to go and start recording the next album tomorrow." As the band finished the album, Bowie was sure they would continue. He said, "There'll be another two albums at least. Oh, yes, this will go for a while. While we're all enjoying playing with each other so much, why not?"

== Music and lyrics ==
There's going to be a whole bunch of people who'll say it's just not accessible. It's not as obviously melodic as one would think it probably would be.

— David Bowie on the music

Reviewers have categorised Tin Machine as rock, hard rock, art rock and noise rock. Biographers have also identified elements of blues rock on "Heaven's in Here", post-punk and new wave on "Bus Stop" and alternative rock on "Run"; Bowie himself described "Heaven's in Here" as "deconstructionist R&B". Stylistically, Bowie felt that Tin Machine was a continuation of Scary Monsters (1980): "It's almost dismissive of the last three albums I've done. Getting back on course, you could say." AllMusic's Mark Allender described the music as "hard-edged guitar rock" that contains "intelligence" which other albums in the genre lacked at the time. Ted Asregadoo of Ultimate Classic Rock similarly considered it "grittier" than other rock bands of the time. The author James E. Perone calls the music "loud guitar rock, with a sonic edge" that contains malicious lyrics. Tony Fox Sales described the band's approach to the music they created by saying:

We were so sick of turning on the radio and hearing disco and dance music and drum machines; all that stuff, which I think in the business they call "crap." We were just thinking about doing a project that would put an end to rock 'n' roll.

Jon Pareles of The New York Times stated that lyrically, Tin Machine "juxtaposes love songs with rants about current crises". He noted that, with the exceptions of "Pretty Thing" and "Sacrifice Yourself", the majority of the love songs "approach romantic cliches". Perone states that the "apocalyptic imagery" of the title track sets up the overarching theme of "the end of the world" that "pervades" the album. Pegg finds that the band's refusal to allow Bowie to rewrite lyrics results in words that are mostly "half-baked". Some songs cover sensitive subjects including neo-Nazism and drugs on "Under the God" and "Crack City", respectively. Others, including "I Can't Read" and "Video Crime", discuss the effects of television on literacy and tabloids, respectively. According to O'Leary, Bowie recalls his then-unreleased track "Shadow Man" on "Baby Can Dance". Gabrels later described the songs as Tin Machine "screaming at the world".

== Release and promotion ==
The cover artwork for Tin Machine depicts the four band members in dark suits, which Spitz describes as giving them a look of "a gang of clean-cut bankers". Bowie grew a goatee during this time—a first in his career—which Spitz states polarised audiences. When promoting the album, Bowie made it clear to interviewers that the band were a democratic unit, with Pegg calling it the mindset of "anyone wanting to interview David would get the rest of the band as well". This move was written off by critics as a publicity stunt by an artist who is unsure of what he wanted to do next. Bowie commented in 1999: "I think the context annoyed and angered, and really gave the critics the excuse they needed to humiliate somebody, which is what they really look for more than anything else."

Upon hearing of Tin Machine and the album, Bowie's label EMI America Records were perplexed. Tim Palmer told Buckley that the label were eager for another Let's Dance best-seller and confused regarding Bowie's new direction. The label were unsure of how to market the album, so they attached stickers to the cover informing potential buyers that it was Bowie's new project. Nevertheless, EMI America released Tin Machine on 22 May 1989, issuing different LP and CD formats, with the catalogue numbers MTLS 1044 and CDP 7919902, respectively. At the time of release, the album sold well initially, peaking at number three on the UK Albums Chart, three places higher than Never Let Me Down, and number 28 on the US Billboard Top Pop Albums chart. It also reached the top-ten in Norway and Sweden, although sales decreased quickly. According to Dave Thompson, it spent a total of nine weeks on the UK chart. Short-term sales of Tin Machine were estimated to have been between 200,000 and 1,000,000 copies within a few years.

Tin Machine was accompanied by the release of three singles. The first, "Under the God" backed by "Sacrifice Yourself", was released in June 1989 and peaked at number 51 in the UK. It also enjoyed heavy airplay on MTV and American radio stations. The second, the title track backed by a live cover of Dylan's "Maggie's Farm", was released in September 1989 and peaked at number 48 in the UK. The third and final single, an edit of "Prisoner of Love" backed by a live version of "Baby Can Dance", was released the following month and failed to chart.

=== Music video ===
Tin Machine accompanied the album's release with a 13-minute long music video comprising performance-style clips of songs, with each one segueing into the next, starting with "Pretty Thing" and ending with "Under the God". The video was filmed at The Ritz in New York City and directed by Julien Temple, who had previously worked with Bowie on videos and releases such as Jazzin' for Blue Jean (1984), "Absolute Beginners" (1986) and "Day-In Day-Out" (1987). The film was rarely screened on television at the time, although according to Pegg it was distributed as a supporting feature in some UK cinemas. In 1999, Bowie named the video his all-time favourite of all his music videos. EMI planned an official commercial release for the video in 2007, although this was scrapped due to iTunes' policy of limiting videos to 10 minutes in length. The label instead released partial clips of the title track and "Under the God" and the full-length clips of "Heaven's in Here" and "Prisoner of Love". The full 13-minute video was later released in 2019 to celebrate its 30th anniversary.

=== Live performances ===
The band played an unannounced live show in Nassau while recording Tin Machine, before making a live appearance at the International Rock Awards Show on 31 May 1989. Two weeks later, they embarked on their 12-show Tin Machine Tour, wrapping up in early July. The set-list consisted only of songs from Tin Machine, new tracks and 1960s covers. The shows were received with mixed reviews; the critic Alastair McKay wrote in the Herald Scotland: "For all their experience, the band are poor timekeepers, and Bowie's voice is at sea with the very notion of high-volume aggression. ... [T]he grinning Bowie promised his group would return to repeat the experience in the new year. This raised just one question: Why?" Gabrels later insisted that because of the Sales brothers, the band improvised "one third of every show". A performance on 25 June in Paris was released for digital download and streaming in August 2019, to coincide with the 30th anniversary of Tin Machine. The release, called Live at La Cigale, Paris, 25th June, 1989, was mastered by Palmer. At the conclusion of the tour, Tin Machine took a break before reconvening in Australia during late 1989 to begin recording their next album. While there, they performed a one-off gig in Sydney on 4 November. The sessions for Tin Machine II (1991) continued until January 1990 before suspending, as Bowie announced his new solo Sound+Vision Tour.

== Reception ==
Professional ratings
Review scores
Source	Rating
AllMusic	4/5 stars
Robert Christgau	B−
Record Mirror	3/5 stars
Rolling Stone	3.5/5 stars
Spin Alternative Record Guide	1/10

Tin Machine was met with generally mixed reviews from music critics on release. Trynka states that while many welcomed it as Bowie's most challenging record since Station to Station (1976) and Low (1977), the album was criticised as "pompous, dogmatic and dull". Some noted it as Bowie's most aggressive work since 1980's Scary Monsters, with a reviewer for Q magazine calling it "the loudest, hardest, heaviest effort of his entire career" and "an experience that's not unlike allowing your head to be used as a punchbag". Rolling Stone's David Fricke praised the album's "cynical, indignant and acidic" approach to music as an "all-too-welcome feast of aggro-guitar flamboyance and bass-drum body checking", noting that at times it sounds like Sonic Youth meets Station to Station. A review by the McClatchy Company called Tin Machine "a lean, mean rock 'n' roll machine", that showed how "Bowie's back". Don Waller of the Los Angeles Times gave the album a positive review, calling all 12 tracks on the LP edition "solid" and welcoming "a couple" as "classic additions" to Bowie's catalogue. On the other hand, Pareles felt that most of the songs "seem unlikely to stand up over time" against Bowie's best work.

Joe Levy of Spin magazine called the album "noise rock without the noise. Aggressive, direct, brutal and stylishly plain, it combines the energy of the rock avant-garde with traditional R&B rhythmic punch", summarising the album by calling it "incendiary fun" and noting that "the buoyant Sales brothers and Gabrels certainly equal and frequently surpass Bowie". Jon Savage didn't understand what the band were going for, describing the music as having "an ugly macho side to it". In Record Mirror, Steve Masters said the music "trudges along mechanically in a kind of soft metal mould" and the album itself ends up "a dusty trip down self-indulgence street". When asked in an interview what the main criticism of Tin Machine was, Bowie conceded that the album might be "not accessible" to fans: "I guess it's not as obviously melodic as one would think it would probably be [for a Bowie album]." Spitz states that Bowie believed his audience was ill-prepared for the sound he wanted to go towards if he had released it under his own name. Tin Machine appeared on Q magazine's 1989 end of the year list; the same magazine placed the album on a list of "Fifty Albums That Should Have Never Been Made" only seven years later. In a 1998 poll conducted by Melody Maker compiling the 20 worst albums of all time, as chosen by numerous DJs and journalists, Tin Machine was voted number 17.

== Legacy ==
I think [Tin Machine] was important as it was sort of a proto-grunge album. [...] Tin Machine I think opened the door to some of the more chaotic-sounding guitar bands. This, to me, was the least vital Bowie album for some time. People seemed to either love it or hate it. At least we got a strong reaction.

— Tim Palmer on Tin Machine

Some reviewers noted that the band explored elements of grunge and alternative rock before those styles became popular; Tim Palmer and Asregadoo considered the record's sound "proto-grunge". Allender and Asregadoo argued that the album was ahead of its time and had the release been five to six years later, it may have garnered more appreciation.

Bowie's biographers have given the album mixed assessments overall. Although Perone feels it was a good debut album that found "some of the 1970s edge returning to Bowie's music and lyrics", he criticises the lyrics throughout and believes the special charm of Bowie's earlier solo efforts was lost. Pegg states: "As an album in its own right, Tin Machine [remains] one of the least satisfactory listening experiences in Bowie's recorded legacy," a sentiment echoed by Trynka, who calls it an album that is "hard to love", which he notes may have been Bowie's initial intention. Buckley primarily criticises the lack of melodies or catchy choruses, a sentiment echoed by Bowie's previous collaborator Adrian Belew. Nevertheless, some reviewers have praised certain tracks, including "I Can't Read", which Bowie himself considered the best song on the record. Bowie rerecorded the song during the sessions for his 1997 album Earthling, which appeared in the 1998 film The Ice Storm and later on the 2020 EP Is It Any Wonder?

== Track listing ==
The CD and cassette releases of the album contain the tracks "Run" and "Sacrifice Yourself", which were excluded from the LP release. All releases since follow the former sequencing.

Tin Machine track listing
No.	Title	Writer(s)	Length
1.	"Heaven's in Here"	David Bowie	6:01
2.	"Tin Machine"	Bowie, Reeves Gabrels, Hunt Sales, Tony Fox Sales	3:34
3.	"Prisoner of Love"	Bowie, Gabrels, H. Sales, T. Sales	4:50
4.	"Crack City"	Bowie	4:36
5.	"I Can't Read"	Bowie, Gabrels	4:54
6.	"Under the God"	Bowie	4:06
7.	"Amazing"	Bowie, Gabrels	3:06
8.	"Working Class Hero"	John Lennon	4:38
9.	"Bus Stop"	Bowie, Gabrels	1:41
10.	"Pretty Thing"	Bowie	4:39
11.	"Video Crime"	Bowie, H. Sales, T. Sales	3:52
12.	"Run"	Kevin Armstrong, Bowie	3:20
13.	"Sacrifice Yourself"	Bowie, H. Sales, T. Sales	2:08
14.	"Baby Can Dance"	Bowie	4:57

== Personnel ==
According to the liner notes and biographer Nicholas Pegg.

Tin Machine

- David Bowie – lead vocals, rhythm guitar
- Reeves Gabrels – lead guitar
- Tony Fox Sales – bass guitar, backing vocals
- Hunt Sales – drums, backing vocals

Additional musician

- Kevin Armstrong – rhythm guitar, Hammond organ (B-3) ("Pretty Thing")

Production

- Tin Machine – producer
- Tim Palmer – producer, mixing
- Justin Shirley-Smith – engineer
- David Richards – additional engineering
- Roger Gorman (Reiner Design) – art direction & design
- Masayoshi Sukita – photography

== Charts ==
=== Weekly charts ===
Weekly chart performance for Tin Machine
Chart (1989)	Peak position
Australian Albums (ARIA)	42
Austrian Albums (Ö3 Austria)	19
Canada Top Albums/CDs (RPM)	19
Dutch Albums (Album Top 100)	24
German Albums (Offizielle Top 100)	13
New Zealand Albums (RMNZ)	14
Norwegian Albums (VG-lista)	9
Swedish Albums (Sverigetopplistan)	9
UK Albums (Official Charts)	3
US Billboard 200	28

=== Year-end charts ===
Year-end chart performance for Tin Machine
Chart (1989)	Position
German Albums (Offizielle Top 100)	96

== Certifications and sales ==
Certifications and sales for Tin Machine
Region	Certification	Certified units/sales
Canada (Music Canada)	Gold	50,000^{^}
Italy	—	85,000
United Kingdom (BPI)	Gold	100,000^{^}
^{^} Shipments figures based on certification alone.
