= International Rock Awards =

Former American music ceremony

- Description: Television music awards ceremony honoring achievements in rock music
- Sponsored by: The Coca-Cola Company (1989)
- Country: United States
- Presented by: ABC

Television/radio coverage
- Network: ABC

The International Rock Awards was a United States music award ceremony meant to honor the top musicians in the rock music genre. The awards were broadcast on ABC for three years from 1989 to 1991. The award show is interpreted to have been an attempt to provide a buildup to the Grammy Awards, but failed to attract sufficient viewers to remain successful. BFI lists the first award ceremony in 1989 as The Coca-Cola International Rock Awards, indicating that the event was sponsored by The Coca-Cola Company. The awards were attended by a number of celebrities from rock music and the film industry, including Eric Clapton, Keith Richards, Grace Jones, Robert Palmer, Ozzy Osbourne, Alice Cooper and Lou Reed. The program also featured entertainer performances and celebrities made a number of presentations.
