= Docks (nightclub) =

Music venue in Hamburg, Germany

Coordinates: 53°32′57″N 9°57′52″E

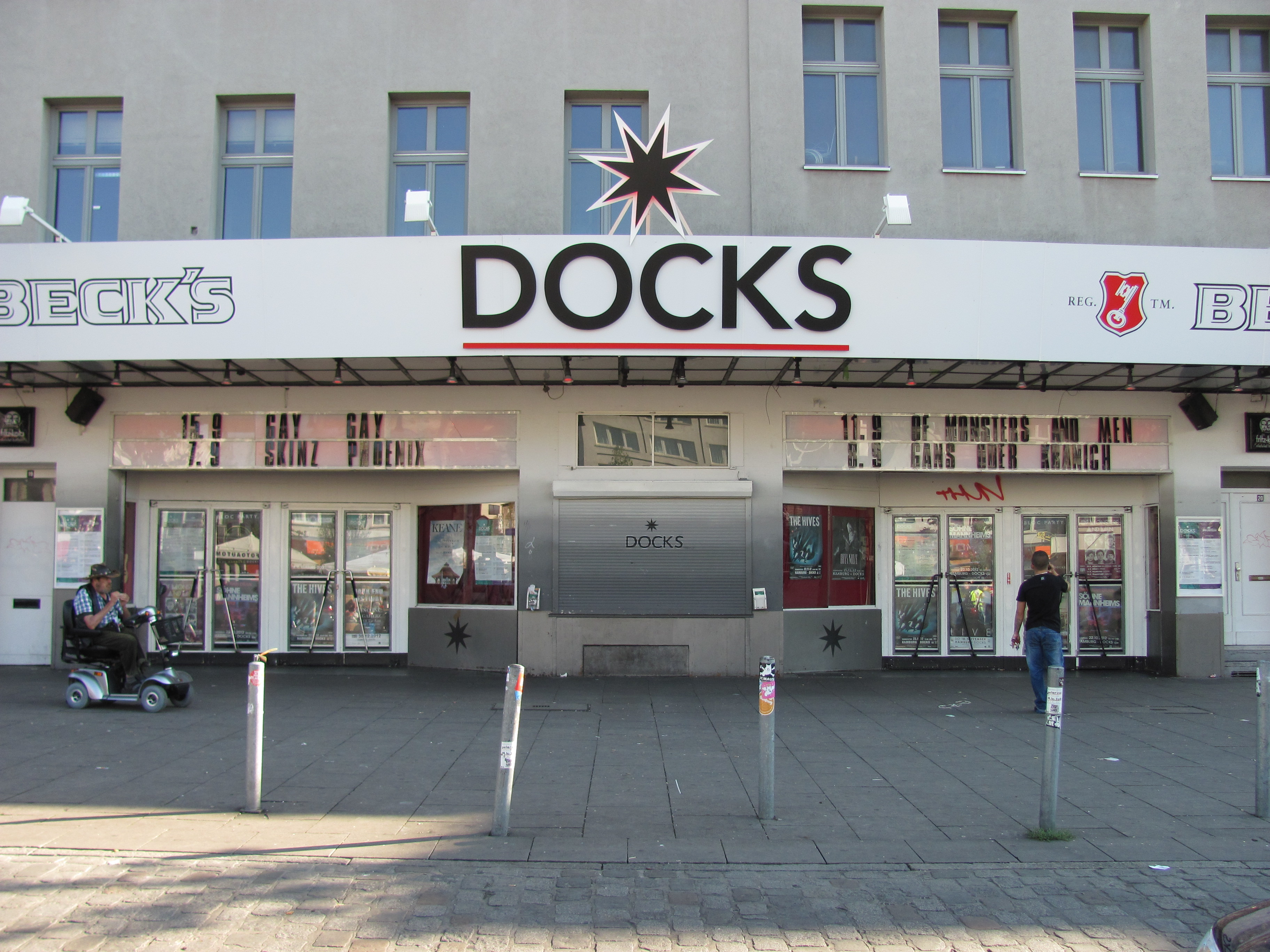
Docks

Docks (formerly Knopf's Music Hall) is a nightclub located at Spielbudenplatz in the St. Pauli district of Hamburg, Germany. It has a capacity between 1,250 and 1,500 people. The building opened in 1900 as a cinema. Notable past performers include Bob Dylan, Black Sabbath, David Bowie, Metallica, Motörhead, Ramones, Red Hot Chili Peppers, Def Leppard, Ozzy Osbourne, Dio, Iron Maiden, Nine Inch Nails, Liam Gallagher, and Melissa Etheridge (who played here on November 9, 1989, and then drove to West-Berlin encountering East-Germans who crossed to West-Germany at the border control in Gudow).

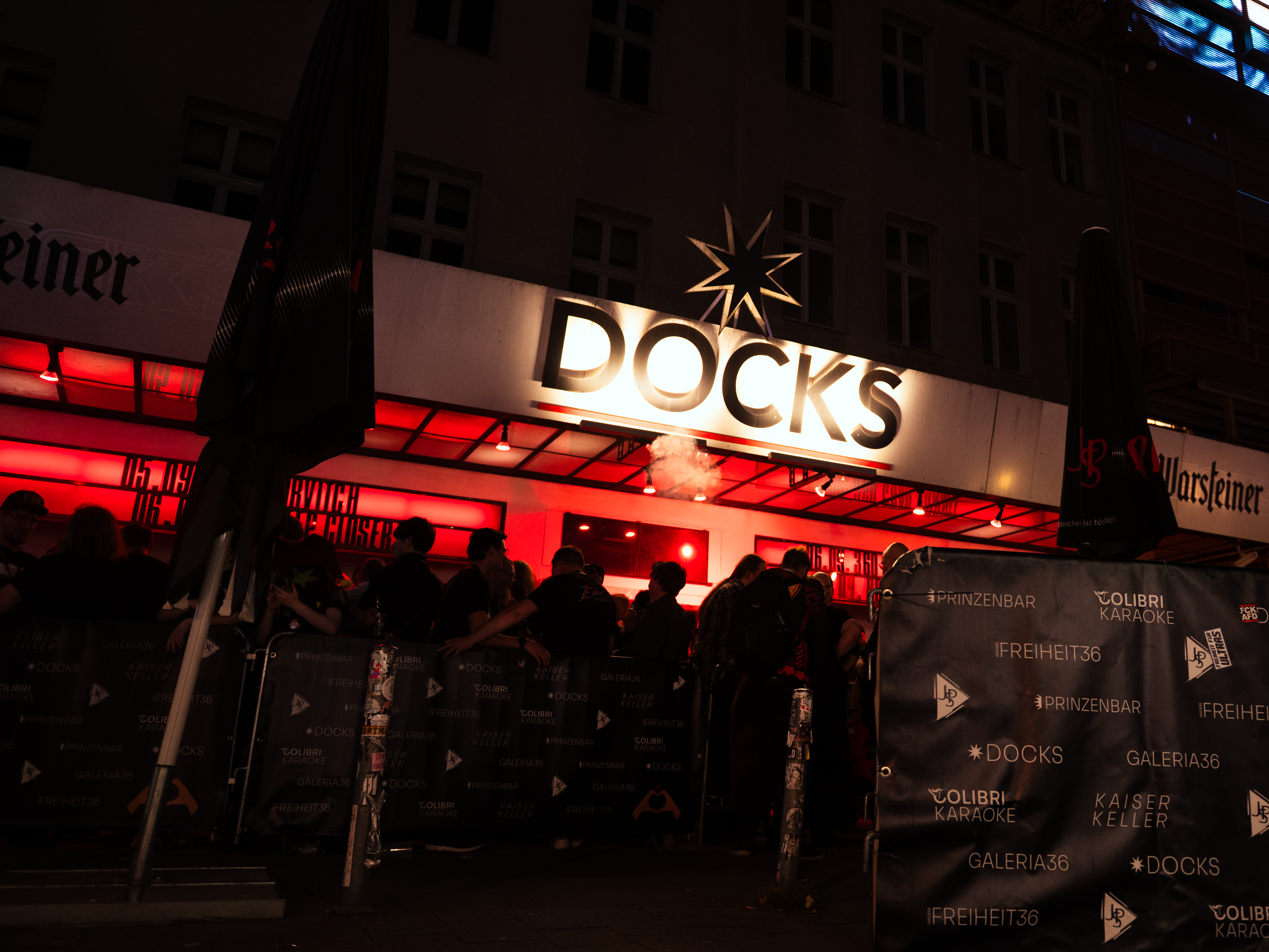
Docks – At Night

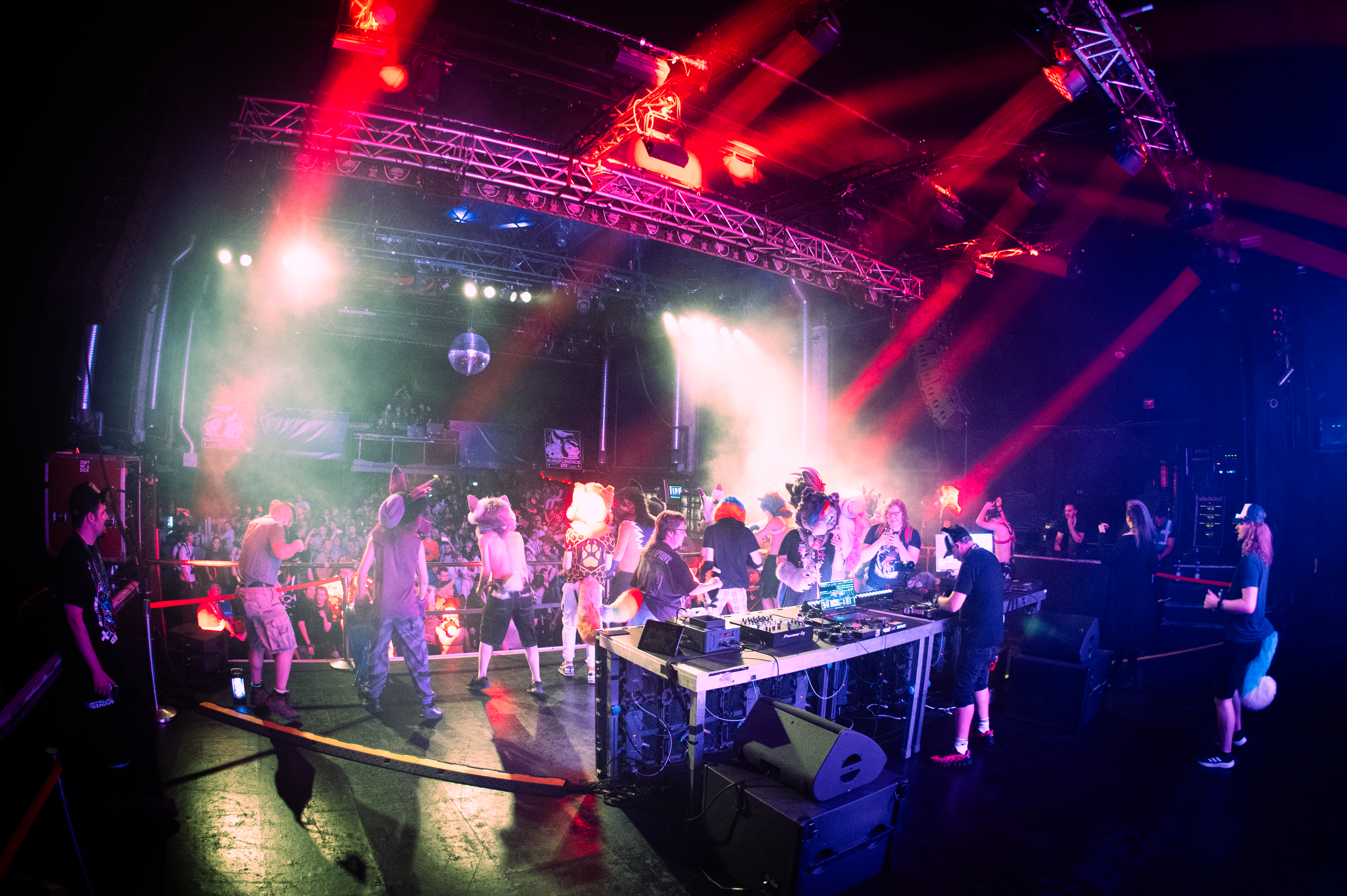
Docks – Inside
