= Tim Palmer (music producer) =

British record producer

Timothy J. Palmer (born 4 October 1962, in North Shields) is an English record producer, audio engineer, guitarist and songwriter of rock and alternative music. He mixed Pearl Jam's debut album Ten (1991) and tracks on U2's album All That You Can't Leave Behind (2000). Palmer has produced for over four decades and has worked with artists such as U2, Robert Plant, Ozzy Osbourne, Tears for Fears, the Mission, the Mighty Lemon Drops, Gene Loves Jezebel, Pearl Jam, David Bowie's Tin Machine, HIM, Blue October, Jason Mraz, the Polyphonic Spree, the House of Love, Texas, Tarja Turunen, the Cure, Cutting Crew, Porcupine Tree, Faith Hill, Goo Goo Dolls, LIVE, Kandace Springs, Sweet Water, Lang Lang, Switchfoot, Lizz Wright, Billy Childs, Goldfinger, JD Souther, Steve Grand, Pitty and the Psychedelic Furs.

== Biography ==
Palmer started his career in London. In the early 1980s, Palmer was an assistant engineer at Phil Wainman's Utopia Studios in London where he worked with musicians such as Mark Knopfler and Dead or Alive. By age 21, he had his first No. 1 single, mixing "(I Just) Died in Your Arms" (1986) for Cutting Crew. In the latter half of the 1980s, Palmer became a producer, and his ears and technical knowledge contributed to groups such as the the Mighty Lemon Drops, the Mission, with whom he worked for several years, and Gene Loves Jezebel. In 1988, Palmer produced Now and Zen for rock singer Robert Plant (top 10 U.S. album) as well as Tin Machine, David Bowie's debut LP with Tin Machine in 1989.

In the 1990s, Palmer started to focus more on mixing for diverse groups like Mother Love Bone, the Cure, Sponge, Wire Train, James, Catherine Wheel, Ned's Atomic Dustbin, and Concrete Blonde. He produced The House of Love (1990) for the House of Love, and mixed Ten (1991) for Pearl Jam. He also produced Tears for Fears albums Elemental (1993), Raoul and the Kings of Spain (1995) and Everybody Loves a Happy Ending (2004).

Palmer relocated to Los Angeles, California, United States, to build his own mixing facility and was nominated for a Grammy Award for his mixing work on U2's All That You Can't Leave Behind album. He produced and co-wrote songs with Ozzy Osbourne on the platinum-selling album Down to Earth (2001), and mixed Porcupine Tree's In Absentia (2002). Palmer then produced and mixed for Switchfoot, Goo Goo Dolls and Dark Light and Venus Doom by HIM. Since moving his studio to Austin, Texas in 2009, he has produced and mixed for Jason Mraz, Blue October and Bob Schneider. Palmer has been a moderator for three years at SXSW, and is a Governor of the Texas chapter of the Recording Academy. He mixed songs for several Austin bands, including Bob Schneider and Quiet Company.

Palmer mixed Julien-K's debut album, Death to Analog (2009). He worked with the Goo Goo Dolls on their ninth studio album, Something for the Rest of Us, that same year, and mixed Norwegian rock band Malice in Wonderland's single, "City Angel". In 2010, Palmer worked on tracks for Tarja Turunen's album What Lies Beneath. He mixed Blue October's 2003 album History for Sale, and has continued a close working relationship with Blue October, producing their 2011 album Any Man in America, and mixing their albums Sway, Home, and I Hope You're Happy.

In November 2012, Palmer mixed HIM's album Tears on Tape in London, and as of January 2013, had been mixing and co-producing a new album from Polyphonic Spree. He also worked once again with Tarja Turunen on her album Colours in the Dark.

More recently, Palmer has mixed many jazz albums for record producer Larry Klein. Together they have worked with Billy Childs, Lizz Wright, JD Souther, Kandace Springs, Lang Lang, Hailey Tuck and recently a tribute to Charlie Parker, The Passion of Charlie Parker featuring sax player Donny McCaslin.

In 2017, Palmer mixed the Tears for Fears single "I Love You but I'm Lost". It was their first new music in 13 years, and it was immediately named 'Record of the Week' on BBC Radio 2.

In recent years, Palmer has played an active role in The Recording Academy. He has been a board member in Texas for three terms and is now serving as a National Trustee. Palmer also serves on the advisory board for Austin non-profit Black Fret.
