= Reeves Gabrels =

American guitarist (born 1956)

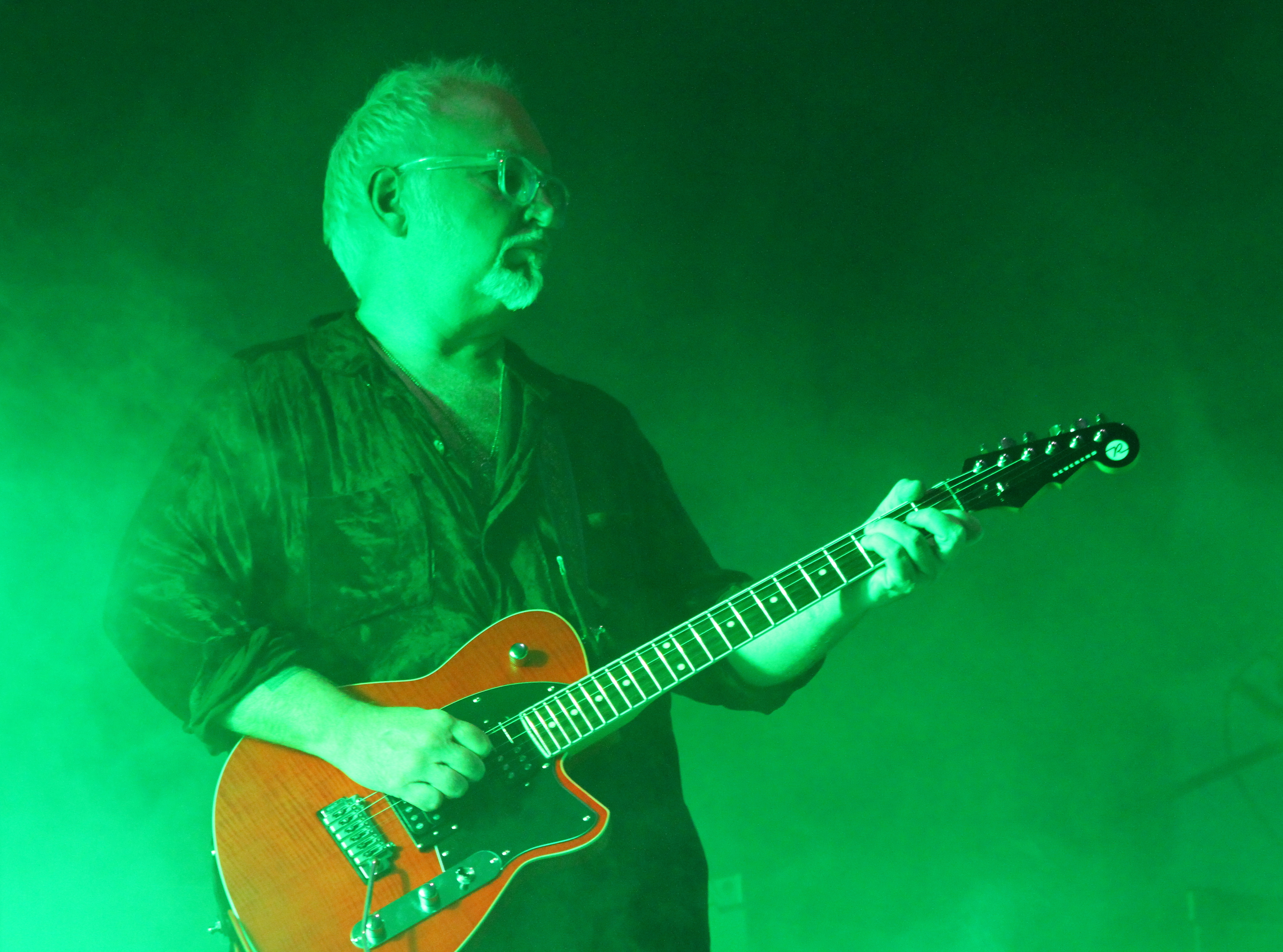
- Reeves Gabrels at Frequency Festival 2012

Background information
- Born: June 4, 1956 (age 70); Staten Island, New York, United States
- Genres: Rock, hard rock
- Occupations: Musician; songwriter
- Instruments: Guitar; vocals; bass
- Years active: 1980–present
- Member of: The Cure; Reeves Gabrels & His Imaginary Friends
- Formerly of: Tin Machine; David Bowie

Reeves Gabrels (born June 4, 1956) is an American guitarist, songwriter and producer. A member of The Cure since 2012, Gabrels is also known for his work with David Bowie and Tin Machine from 1988 to 1999. He also fronts the band Reeves Gabrels & His Imaginary Friends, which is based in Nashville.

As a guitarist, Gabrels is recognized for his virtuosity and versatility, and been praised for his ability to "explore sonic extremes with a great, adaptive intuition for what each song needs most." He has been characterized as "one of the most daring rock-guitar improvisers since Jimi Hendrix".

== Early life and education ==
Reeves Gabrels was born in Staten Island, New York on June 4, 1956. His mother Claire was a typist, and his father Carl was a part-time jazz musician and worked as a deckhand on tugboats in New York Harbor. Gabrels started playing guitar at age 13, and the following year his father arranged for lessons with his friend Turk Van Lake. Van Lake was a professional musician who had played with Benny Goodman and others.

After high school, Gabrels attended the Parsons School of Design and the School of Visual Arts in New York. He took lessons from jazz guitarist John Scofield. Gabrels then moved to Boston to attend the Berklee School of Music, though he did not graduate.

== Career ==
During the 1980s and early 1990s, Gabrels was a member of bands including The Dark, Life on Earth, The Atom Said, Rubber Rodeo, The Bentmen, Deaf School, Too Happy, and Modern Farmer. His first professional recording was in 1983 with the Christopher Jones Band. Modern Farmer, which also included David Hull, released an album in 1994.

=== David Bowie and Tin Machine ===
Gabrels first met David Bowie in 1987 during a Bowie tour for which Gabrels' then-wife worked as a publicist. Gabrels's first project with Bowie was a re-imagining and rearrangement of the song "Look Back in Anger" for live performances combining dance, music, and video as part of a benefit for London's Institute of Contemporary Arts in 1988. Bowie expressed appreciation for Gabrels's guitar work for the project.

Later in 1988, Gabrels and Bowie formed the hard rock band Tin Machine with Hunt Sales and Tony Sales, and the band released two albums before disbanding in 1992. Gabrels continued to work with Bowie until 1999, co-writing and co-producing material on the albums Outside (1995), Earthling (1997), and Hours (1999). "Dead Man Walking," a Bowie/Gabrels song from Earthling, was nominated for a Grammy award. Gabrels and Bowie also created the soundtrack for the computer game Omikron: The Nomad Soul. He parted ways with Bowie in late 1999, and his last performance with Bowie was for VH1 Storytellers.

From 1989 through his departure ten years later, Gabrels was the guitarist on four concert tours with Bowie: the Tin Machine Tour of 1989, the It's My Life Tour (1991-92), the Outside Tour (1995–96) and the Earthling Tour (1997).

=== The Cure ===
Gabrels first met Robert Smith of The Cure during rehearsals for Bowie's 50th Birthday Concert on January 9, 1997 at Madison Square Garden. Bowie had invited Smith to sing at this event, for which Gabrels served as musical director. Gabrels then made a guest appearance on the 1997 Cure single "Wrong Number" and appeared with the band several times during their 1997 tour. Gabrels, Smith, and Cure drummer Jason Cooper then formed the side project COGASM in 1998 to record the song "Sign From God" for Orgazmo, a film directed by Trey Parker. Gabrels and Smith co-wrote the song "Yesterday's Gone", with Smith on vocals, for Gabrels's 1999 album Ulysses (Della Notte).

Smith and Gabrels stayed in touch; in 2012, Gabrels was invited to play as a guest during several Cure concerts. Gabrels then became an official member of the Cure and has performed with them ever since, though his first official recording with the band wouldn't happen until years later when they started recording Songs of a Lost World. Gabrels was inducted into the Rock and Roll Hall of Fame in March 2019 as a member of the Cure, having initially been left off the list of nine current and former members.

=== Solo career ===
Gabrels has released six solo albums on which he served as singer, guitarist, and principal songwriter, starting with The Sacred Squall of Now in 1995. During this period he also contributed to several movie and video game soundtracks, including Deus Ex.

His 1999 album Ulysses (Della Notte) was nominated for a Yahoo! Internet Award in 1999 as a then-pathbreaking Internet-only release, before becoming available the following year on CD. His 2005 album Rockonica was widely praised for its experimentation. For example, Guitar Player's Andy Ellis wrote: "Gabrels walks the line between song structure and wiggy sonics like no one else. [...] But bubbling and roiling under and around this foundation are layers of eerie, broken sounds and oddball textures. And Gabrels isn't shy about juxtaposing genres."

His fifth and sixth albums were released under the name Reeves Gabrels & His Imaginary Friends, featuring collaborators from the music scene in Nashville, Tennessee whom Reeves first assembled in 2007. Their self-titled 2015 album received a favorable review from Vintage Guitar, and their 2017 live album was named as one of the best releases of the year by the guitar aficionado publications Guitar Moderne and Premier Guitar. Gabrels continues to tour with this ensemble during breaks in his work with the Cure.

=== Collaborations ===
Gabrels is an in-demand session and touring musician, starting in 1993 with Paul Rodgers, and later with artists such as Jeffrey Gaines and Los Duran. He was briefly a member of the European heavy metal supergroup X-World/5.

After moving to Nashville, Tennessee in 2006, Gabrels often collaborates informally with local musicians for live performances in small venues. These impromptu collaborations led to some studio albums, such as The Magnificent Others and Sonic Mining Company. During this period Gabrels began collaborating periodically with the Boston-based improvisational and instrumental group Club d'Elf, appearing on their album Now I Understand in 2006. Gabrels still collaborates with this group periodically, and has credited their experimental and improvisational techniques for improving his live performances with the Cure.

Gabrels also frequently serves as a guest musician for artists in a variety of genres, such as gODHEAD, The Mission, Deaf School, Sandie Shaw, The Rolling Stones, and Ozzy Osbourne. He released the experimental guitar duo album Fantastic Guitars with Bill Nelson in 2014. In 2022 he played guitar on the album The Long Morrow by Big Scenic Nowhere.

== Instruments ==
Gabrels has used many different guitars throughout his career, selecting instruments to suit the music. He has favored Steinberger guitars, the Parker Fly, and Fernandes Guitars; but also plays Gibson and Fender guitars. He has often chosen lesser-known makers, explaining in interviews that he prefers a guitar without a set history and with which he is free to create sounds from his own imagination.

In 2008, Gabrels began playing guitars designed by Reverend Musical Instruments. Gabrels and Reverend have since developed a series of Reverend Reeves Gabrels signature model guitars. The first featured at the 2010 NAMM Show in Anaheim, California, and several updated designs have been developed in the years since.

== Personal life ==
Gabrels's first wife Sara Terry was a press agent for the Glass Spider Tour in 1987, and Gabrels first collaborated with David Bowie via this connection. Gabrels married Susan Van Wie Kastan in 2018, and they reside in Troy, New York.

== Partial discography ==
Tin Machine

- Tin Machine (1989)
- Tin Machine II (1991)
- Tin Machine Live: Oy Vey, Baby (1992)

David Bowie

- Black Tie White Noise (1993)
- Outside (1995)
- Earthling (1997)
- Earthling in the City (1997)
- Hours (1999)
- The Nomad Soul (1999)
- LiveAndWell.com (2000)
- VH1 Storytellers (recorded and broadcast 1999; released on CD and DVD in 2009)

Solo

- The Sacred Squall of Now (1995)
- Ulysses (Della Notte) (1999)
- live...late...loud (2003)
- Rockonica (2005)
- Reeves Gabrels and His Imaginary Friends (2015)
- Imaginary Friends Live (2017)

Collaborations

- Too Happy (1988) by Too Happy
- Hard Row to Hoe (1994) by Modern Farmer
- Night In Amnesia (1995) with David Tronzo
- Sonicnauts (2006) by Protecto
- Personal Nuclear Assault (2007) by Doom Dogs
- The Magnificent Others (2011) by The Magnificent Others
- Sonic Mining Company (2012) by Sonic Mining Company
- Fantastic Guitars (2014) with Bill Nelson

The Cure

- "Wrong Number" on Galore (1997)
- Songs of a Lost World (2024)

Other Guest Performances/Song Collaborations

- Carved in Sand (1990) by The Mission, features additional guitar by Reeves Gabrels on "Into the Blue" and "Hungry as the Hunter"
- Grains of Sand (1990) by The Mission, features additional guitar by Reeves Gabrels on "Dived We Fall" (B-side Into The Blue, single).
- Emotional Rain (1994) by Lee Aaron, features guitars by Reeves Gabrels & Knox Chandler on all but two tracks
- Cortlandt (1996) by Sean Malone, features guitars by Reeves Gabrels on "At Taliesin"
- Left of the Middle (1997) by Natalie Imbruglia, features guitars by Reeves Gabrels on "Don't You Think"
- Metropolis (1997) by Sister Machine Gun, features guitar performances by Reeves Gabrels
- He Got Game (soundtrack) (1998), features guitar by Reeves Gabrels on "Go Cat Go" by Public Enemy
- Live 3/28/02 Athens GA (2003) by Club d'Elf
- Now I Understand (2006) by Club d'Elf
- Emperors of Medieval Japan (2015) by Lisa Ronson, features guitar by Reeves Gabrels as a guest on "Shopping and F*cking" and "Get To You"
- Fist Full of Devils (2021) by Earl Slick, features guitar by Reeves Gabrels on "Emerald"
- The Long Morrow (2022) by Big Scenic Nowhere, features guitars by Reeves Gabrels on the title track
