= Tony Fox Sales =

American musician (born 1951)

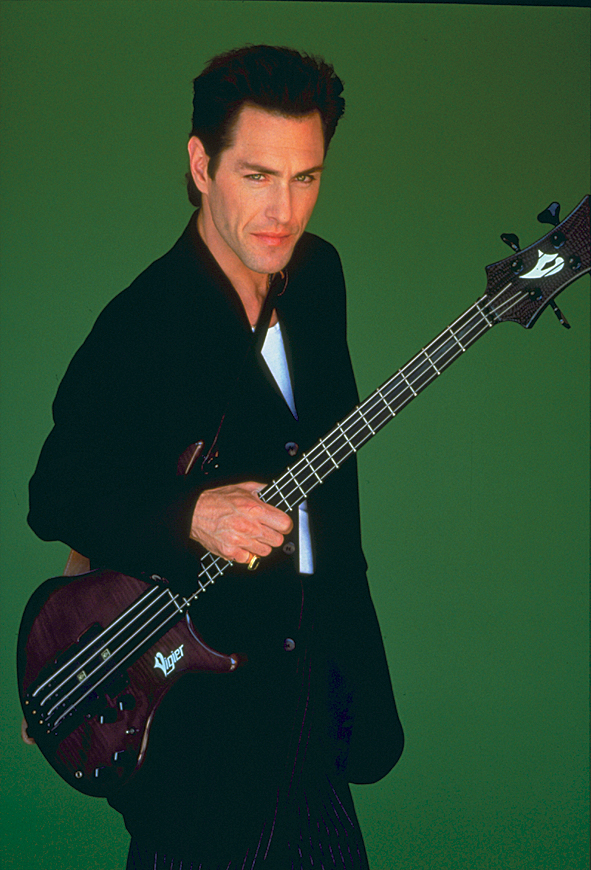
- Tony Sales

Background information
- Born: September 26, 1951 (age 74); Cleveland, Ohio, U.S.
- Origin: Detroit, Michigan, U.S.
- Genres: Rock; hard rock
- Occupations: Musician; composer
- Instruments: Bass guitar; vocals
- Years active: 1965–present
- Labels: EMI; Perseverance Records

Tony Fox Sales (born September 26, 1951) is an American rock musician and composer. Primarily a bass player, Sales has worked with Todd Rundgren, Iggy Pop, and in Tin Machine with David Bowie, often alongside his brother Hunt Sales, a drummer.

== Early life, family and education ==
Sales was born in Cleveland, Ohio. His father was 1950s/60s TV comedian Soupy Sales (January 8, 1926 – October 22, 2009), and his mother was Barbara Fox (June 23, 1931 – May 28, 2017). They raised Tony and his younger brother Hunt (born 1954) in Detroit, Michigan.

== Career ==
Tony and Hunt have frequently worked together. Among the prominent musicians they have performed and/or recorded with are: Chequered Past, David Bowie, Iggy Pop, Todd Rundgren, Bob Welch, Andy Fraser of Free, Harry Dean Stanton and The Cheap Dates, The Hunt Sales Memorial, Tin Machine (with Bowie), and others from 1989 to 1994.

=== Early career ===
Tony's first musical group was Tony and the Tigers; Hunt was its drummer. The band also included Jon Pousette-Dart, son of artist Richard Pousette-Dart and later the leader of the Pousette-Dart Band. In 1966, the band appeared on the TV show I've Got a Secret hosted by Steve Allen, and performed two songs, "I'll Be on My Way" and "When the Party's Over". Tony and The Tigers released the song "Turn It on Girl" which was a minor local hit in Detroit. The band appeared twice on the show Hullabaloo: December 20, 1965, hosted by Jerry Lewis; and April 4, 1966, hosted by their father, Soupy Sales. The band also opened for The Animals at Steel Pier in Atlantic City in 1967.

In 1970, the Sales brothers joined Todd Rundgren in the newly formed group, Runt, and recorded two albums. They recorded two tracks for the Iggy Pop/James Williamson album Kill City in 1975 and provided the rhythm section for Pop's album Lust for Life (1977), which was produced by David Bowie, who also played keyboards. The brothers joined Pop on his subsequent tour, recorded as TV Eye Live 1977 and released in 1978.

Some of Tony and Hunt's recordings were placed in storage after Tony was injured in a car accident in 1979 so severely that he was near death for several minutes before being revived. He was consequently in a coma for over eight months but eventually recovered from his injuries and returned to working as a musician.

=== 1980s to present ===
In 1982, Sales joined a band, Chequered Past, which included singer/actor Michael Des Barres (later of Power Station), ex-Sex Pistols guitarist Steve Jones, and Blondie’s bass player Nigel Harrison and drummer Clem Burke. According to Des Barres, the choice of name was not an idle one. "All the members have been through a lot," he told the Los Angeles Times at his house in Hollywood, including the fact that Sales had fully recovered from a debilitating auto accident. After an album released by Chequered Past in 1984 flopped, the band broke up shortly afterward.

The Sales brothers joined David Bowie and Reeves Gabrels to form the band Tin Machine in 1988. The New York Times said of the band's first album, "Tin Machine sounds as if it was made by people working together, not by a producer with a computer." On November 23, 1991, the band performed on Saturday Night Live, which was hosted that episode by then child actor Macaulay Culkin. Tin Machine recorded three albums and toured twice before dissolving in 1992. Bowie later stated that his memories of Tony and Hunt Sales' contribution to Lust for Life led him to invite them to join Tin Machine.

Throughout the 1990s, Sales recorded and produced and was a member of the short-lived all-star band The Cheap Dates, which included actor Harry Dean Stanton, Jeff "Skunk" Baxter and Slim Jim Phantom.

Sales and Hunt's recordings from the late 1970s were released in 2008 by Perseverance Records as a solo album, Hired Guns. An e-book about them, Quintessentially Soul Brothers: The Sales Brothers In Their Own Words by Stephanie Lynne Thorburn, was published in 2009.

== Instruments ==
Since the middle of the eighties Sales has used a Vigier Passion Bass.

== Personal life ==
Tony Sales married English actress/model Anulka Dziubinska on August 20, 1978, in Los Angeles, California. They were divorced in March 1984.

Sales began living with actress Taryn Power, daughter of the movie star Tyrone Power and actress Linda Christian, before his divorce was finalized. They had two children together: Anthony Tyrone "Tony" Sales (born September 4, 1982) and Valentina Fox Sales (born September 10, 1983).

== Discography ==
=== With Todd Rundgren ===
- Runt (1970)
- Runt: The Ballad of Todd Rundgren (1971)
- Something/Anything? (1972)

=== With Iggy Pop ===
- Kill City (recorded 1975, released 1977)
- Sister Midnight (recorded 1977, released 1999)
- Lust for Life (1977)
- TV Eye Live 1977 (1978)

=== With Tin Machine ===
- Tin Machine (1989)
- Tin Machine II (1991)
- Tin Machine Live: Oy Vey, Baby (1992)

=== Solo ===
- Hired Guns (2008)
