= Record Plant =

American recording studios (1968–2024)

- The Plant
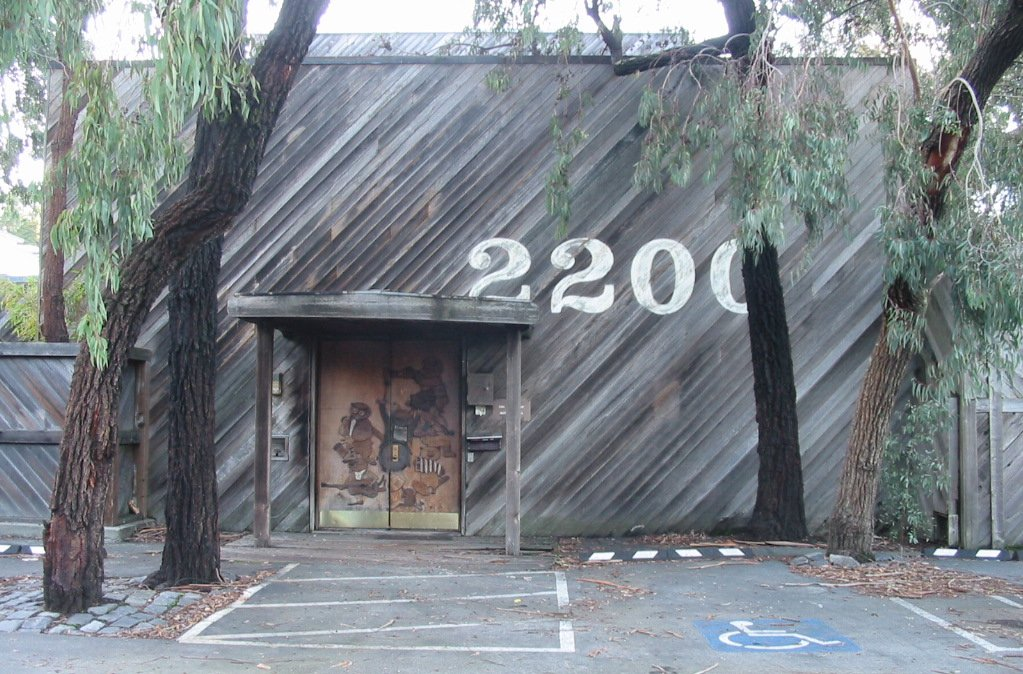
- The former Record Plant studio in Sausalito, California
- Address: 1032 N. Sycamore Ave, Los Angeles, California 90038; 321 W 44th St, New York City, New York 10036; 2200 Bridgeway, Sausalito, California 94965
- Location: New York City, US (1968–1987); Los Angeles, California, US (1969–2024); Sausalito, California, US (1972–2008)
- Type: Recording studio

The Record Plant was a recording studio established in New York City in 1968 and last operating in Los Angeles, California. Known for innovations in the recording artists' workspace, it produced highly influential albums, including the New York Dolls' New York Dolls, Bruce Springsteen's Born to Run, Blondie's Parallel Lines, Metallica's Load and Reload, the Eagles' Hotel California, Fleetwood Mac's Rumours, Cyndi Lauper's She's So Unusual, Hanoi Rocks' Two Steps from the Move, Eminem's The Marshall Mathers LP, Guns N' Roses' Appetite for Destruction, and Kanye West's The College Dropout. More recent albums with songs recorded at Record Plant include Lady Gaga's ARTPOP, D'Angelo's Black Messiah, Justin Bieber's Purpose, Beyoncé's Lemonade, and Ariana Grande's Thank U, Next.

The studio was founded in 1968 in New York City by Gary Kellgren and Chris Stone, who opened a Los Angeles branch the following year and a Sausalito, California, location in 1972. During the 1980s, Stone sold the New York and Sausalito studios; the former closed in 1987, the latter in 2008. The Los Angeles studio closed its doors in 2024. As of 2024, the Sausalito recording site operates as "2200 Studios".

The Record Plant in New York was the first studio to give recording artists a comfortable, casual environment rather than the clinical setting that was normal practice through the 1960s. Kellgren and Stone brought this same vision to their Los Angeles and Sausalito properties, adding a Jacuzzi and billiard table. Stone later said of Kellgren, "He single-handedly was responsible for changing studios from what they were—fluorescent lights, white walls and hardwood floors—to the living rooms that they are today." The Los Angeles location later added VIP lounges.

== New York ==
In 1967, Gary Kellgren was a recording engineer working at several New York City studios, including Mayfair Studios on 701 Seventh Avenue at the edge of Times Square, a drab upstairs office, a single room which held the only professional 8-track recording system in New York. There, Kellgren worked with artists such as the Velvet Underground, who recorded "Sunday Morning" in November 1966; Frank Zappa; and Jimi Hendrix, engineering their recordings and also sweeping the floors. In late 1967, Chris Stone was introduced to Kellgren because Kellgren's wife, Marta, was seven months pregnant and scared of the upcoming birth and Stone's wife, Gloria, had just given birth. Mutual friends thought that the two couples could talk about being parents and ease Marta's worry.

Though they were "diametrically opposed" in nature (with Stone all business and Kellgren very creative), the two quickly became friends. Seeing him at work, Stone determined that Kellgren was not making full use of his genius for making recordings. Stone noticed that the small studio was charging its clients $5,000 per week, but Kellgren was making $200 per week. Stone suggested Kellgren ask for a raise and soon he was making $1,000 per week.

Stone held an MBA from the UCLA Anderson School of Management and was employed as the national sales representative of Revlon cosmetics. Stone convinced Kellgren that the two of them, with $100,000 borrowed from Johanna C.C. "Ancky" Revson Johnson, could start a new recording studio with a better atmosphere for creativity. Johnson was a former model and the second wife of Revlon founder Charles Revson.

In early 1968, Kellgren and Stone began building a new studio at 321 West 44th Street, creating a living room type of environment for the musicians. It initially used an unusual and innovative 12-track machine built by Scully Recording Instruments and opened on March 13, 1968. As the studio was nearing completion, record producer Tom Wilson persuaded Hendrix producer Chas Chandler to book the Record Plant from April 18 to early July 1968 for the recording of the album Electric Ladyland. In early April, just prior to the start of the Hendrix session, the band Soft Machine spent four days recording The Soft Machine, their debut album produced by Wilson and Chandler with Kellgren engineering. When the Jimi Hendrix Experience arrived at the studio, Kellgren engineered the first few dates until Eddie Kramer, the band's familiar engineer, flew in from London. During the production of Electric Ladyland the studio added a new 16-track machine.

In 1969, Kellgren and Stone sold the New York operation to TeleVision Communications (TVC), a cable television company that was broadening its portfolio. The purpose of the sale was to gain cash for expansion into Los Angeles with a second studio.

The next big mixing assignment that the studio accepted was to mix the tracks recorded at the Woodstock Festival. These took more than a month to sort out in the studio, as recording conditions had been primitive and some tracks contained both voice and instruments, preventing separate processing for each.

In 1970, Studio A became the first recording studio designed for mixing quadraphonic sound.

On August 1, 1971, the studio made its first remote recordings at The Concert for Bangladesh at Madison Square Garden.

During the 1970s, house engineers Shelly Yakus and Roy Cicala also gave many local bands their start by donating session time and materials, engineering and producing their demo tapes.

In January 1972, Warner Communications bought the facility from TVC. Head engineer Cicala bought it from Warner.

In April 1973, the New York Dolls recorded their debut album there, produced by Todd Rundgren.

In late 1973, Aerosmith began recording Get Your Wings, their second album. Bob Ezrin, known for producing hits for Alice Cooper, was put in charge, but engineer Jack Douglas put so much into the project that he was called the sixth member of the band. (Douglas's career had started very humbly as janitor at the studio.) The song "Lord of the Thighs" was written and recorded inside the Record Plant's Studio C during an all-night session after the band realized they needed one more song for the album. When Aerosmith returned to the Record Plant in early 1975 to record Toys in the Attic, they named Douglas as sole producer.

The song "Walk This Way" was written after Douglas and the band, without Steven Tyler, went out to see the film Young Frankenstein and were struck by a humorous line spoken by Marty Feldman playing a hunchback. They returned to the studio to tell Tyler what the song's title must be, and Tyler wrote the words on the walls of the stairwell at the Record Plant. For the recording of Draw the Line in 1977, Douglas brought a truckload of Record Plant remote recording equipment to the Cenacle, a 300-room former convent in Armonk, New York.

In 1978, David Hewitt (Dir. of Remote Recording) and crew of John Venable, Phil Gitomer, Robert "Kooster" McAllister and Dave "DB" Brown built the Black Truck, a state of the art mobile studio. They recorded everyone from Aretha Franklin to Frank Zappa, also expanding the Record Plant's client list in live radio, television and films. Among these recorded performances were the first live MTV concert, the Tony Awards, the Grammy Awards, Live from the Met Opera and the films Hail! Hail! Rock 'n' Roll, the Rolling Stones' Let's Spend the Night Together, Neil Young's Rust Never Sleeps, No Nukes and Queen Rock Montreal.

John Lennon was recording "Walking on Thin Ice" at the Record Plant on December 8, 1980, the day he was shot and killed. Willie Nile was also recording Golden Down at the Record Plant the night Lennon was killed.

American pop singer Cyndi Lauper recorded her debut studio album She's So Unusual, one of the most iconic pop albums of the 1980s, at the Record Plant between December 1, 1982, and June 30, 1983.

In 1987, the New York studio was sold to George Martin and closed soon afterward.

== Los Angeles ==
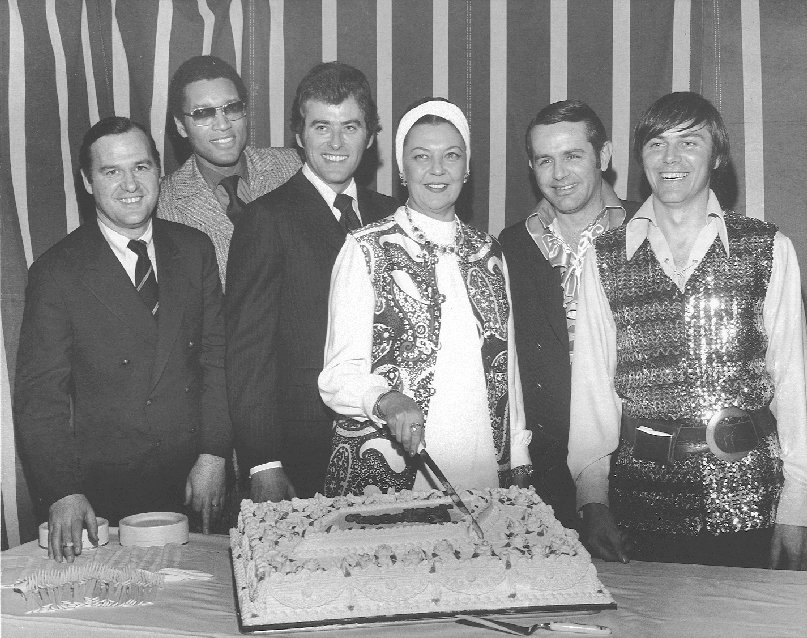
The opening celebration in Los Angeles, December 4, 1969. Pictured L to R: Attorney Tom Butler, producer Tom Wilson, investors Ben Johnson and Ancky Johnson (cutting cake), founders Chris Stone and Gary Kellgren.

Seeing the early success of the New York studio, Kellgren and Stone decided to move to the West Coast and open another studio in Los Angeles. To design the studio, they contracted with Tom Hidley, who had built TTG Studios in 1965 and was becoming known in L.A. for answering the high-decibel needs of rock music. Hidley was brought on board as the "third musketeer", according to Stone. One of the first employees of this studio was Chris Stone's nephew, Mike D. Stone, who would also work as a recording engineer.

On December 4, 1969, the new studio opened its doors on 8456 West Third Street near La Cienega Boulevard. Sometimes known as "Record Plant West", the new studio held a 16-track recorder, larger than the 12-track system in New York (occasionally called "Record Plant East"), and studio time was 20 to 25 percent less expensive than typical studios in New York. In 1970, to stay innovative and retain the prestige of an industry leader, the Record Plant installed a 24-track tape recorder. It was a very large machine assembled by Hidley at the cost of $42,000, but in the next three years it was used on only a few sessions.

Stone and Kellgren had profited enough to buy back their studio from Warner Communications and expand into Sausalito. They expanded with remote recording dates in 1973, including performances by Alice Cooper, Vikki Carr, Sly Stone, Todd Rundgren, Joe Walsh and Rod Stewart. At the same time, the studio worked on projects by the Gap Band for Shelter Records; Mary McCreary, a singer being produced by her husband Leon Russell; and the Partridge Family, in production for Bell Records under producer Wes Farrell.

=== Jim Keltner Fan Club ===
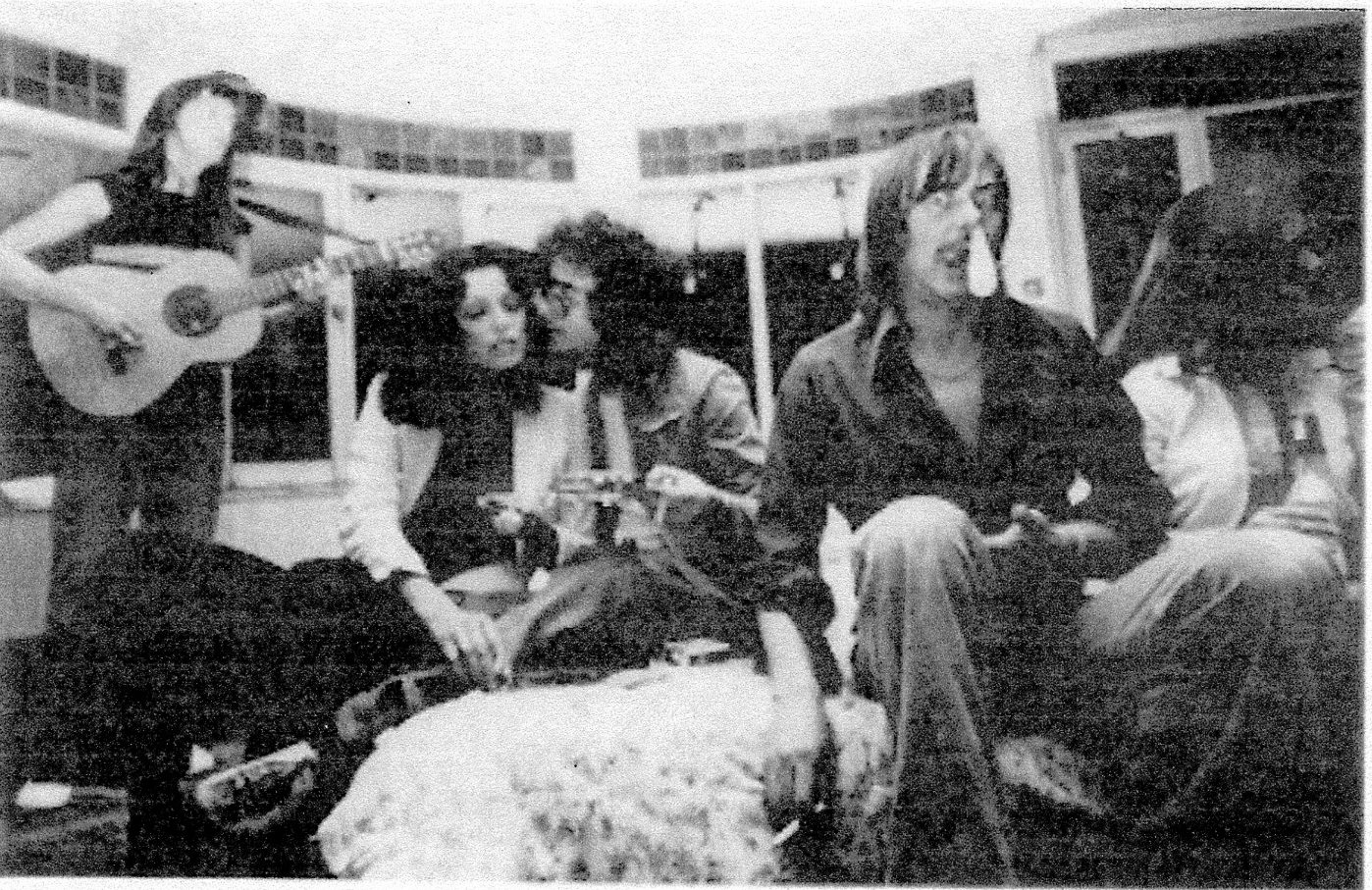
Letting off steam in 1974. Gary Kellgren, second from right, mugs for the camera.

In March 1973, when a third studio—Studio C—was installed at Third Street, Kellgren initiated a series of Sunday night jam sessions hosted by the Record Plant, featuring well-known studio drummer Jim Keltner, a good friend of Kellgren. The jams were known as the Jim Keltner Fan Club Hour. Famous musicians would show up to play along with Keltner included Pete Townshend, Ronnie Wood, Billy Preston, Mick Jagger and George Harrison. Harrison jokingly referred to the sessions on the back cover of his album Living in the Material World. As a jab at Paul McCartney's self-promotion on the back of the album Red Rose Speedway, where it said "for more information on the Wings' Fun Club send a stamped self-addressed envelope...", Harrison wrote on his own album regarding the "Jim Keltner Fun Club", "send a stamped undressed elephant..."

Keyboardist William "Smitty" Smith said that there were regular jam sessions of musicians at Clover Studios on Santa Monica Boulevard near Vine Street in Hollywood, but that the increasing number of musicians outgrew the place and the group moved to the Record Plant for more space. Smith was a regular at the Studio C jams, but one Sunday he could not make it and he sent his friend, David Foster, to play keyboards. Foster was so well received by other musicians that he and three others—Paul Stallworth on bass, Danny Kortchmar on guitar and Keltner on drums—formed the band Attitudes.

One of the Keltner jam sessions in late December 1973 became known later as "Too Many Cooks". Under the leadership of John Lennon, an all-star lineup performed an extended version of the blues song "Too Many Cooks (Spoil the Soup)", with Mick Jagger on lead vocals, Keltner on drums, Kortchmar and Jesse Ed Davis on guitars, Al Kooper on keyboards, Bobby Keys playing tenor saxophone, Trevor Lawrence on baritone saxophone, Jack Bruce on bass and Harry Nilsson singing background vocals.

Jagger was uncomfortable stretching to reach the top of his vocal range and he grew unhappy with the progress being made on the song. Journalist Lucian Truscott IV wrote in 1977 that Kellgren told Jagger to "sit on it", ending the complaints. After Lennon's personal assistant and lover, May Pang, brought the master tapes to light, the track "Too Many Cooks" was released in 2007 on Mick Jagger's album Very Best Of.... Musician and journalist Steven Van Zandt described Jagger's vocals as "ragged but still in control" and the song as "amazing", with "a painful soulfulness [that] hits you and stays with you".

In March 1974, to celebrate the first anniversary of the Jim Keltner Fan Club Hour jam series, Ringo Starr and Moose Johnson joined Keltner on drums; Lennon, Marc Benno and Davis played guitar, Ric Grech played bass, Keys played sax, Gene Clark vocalized, Joe Vitale played flute and Mal Evans supported the large group on percussion. Keltner was working on a solo project by Jack Bruce, formerly of Cream, laying down tracks for Out of the Storm under the direction of engineer and producer Andy Johns; Steve Hunter played guitar.

Also in the building was Stevie Wonder, shaping the mixes for Fulfillingness' First Finale, using Studio B, which was built specifically for him. Jack Bruce first met drummer Bruce Gary (later of the Knack fame) when he showed up at one of the jams hoping to play. Bruce described Gary as a "wannabe drummer", but befriended him and hired him when they were both back in England.

At Burbank Studios on March 28, 1974, a few weeks after the anniversary jam, some of those celebrating at the Record Plant came together again for another jam, also called "the Jim Keltner Fan Club Hour", though it was not hosted or organized by Kellgren, nor was Keltner in attendance. Lennon played with Keys, Davis and Wonder, among others, and McCartney joined in part way through. The raw recordings with their uneven performances were issued as a bootleg album called A Toot and a Snore in '74, the final time that Lennon played with McCartney.

=== 1977 and beyond ===
In July 1977, Kellgren drowned in the swimming pool at his Hollywood home. A business associate of Kellgren was in the house at the time; he called police and reported that Kellgren had recently been in surgery and that he had been swimming in the deep end of the pool. Kellgren's girlfriend and secretary, Kristianne Gaines, also drowned. Gaines, 34, a resident of Los Angeles, was last seen alive sitting on a raft in the pool because she could not swim. Guitarist Ronnie Wood wrote that Kellgren probably died of electric shock while trying to fix some underwater speakers in his pool and that Gaines drowned trying to help him.

The loss of his friend and business partner hit Stone hard. Stone was suddenly responsible for keeping all three studios operating, but he concentrated his attention on Los Angeles and slowly began to lose interest in the Sausalito location.

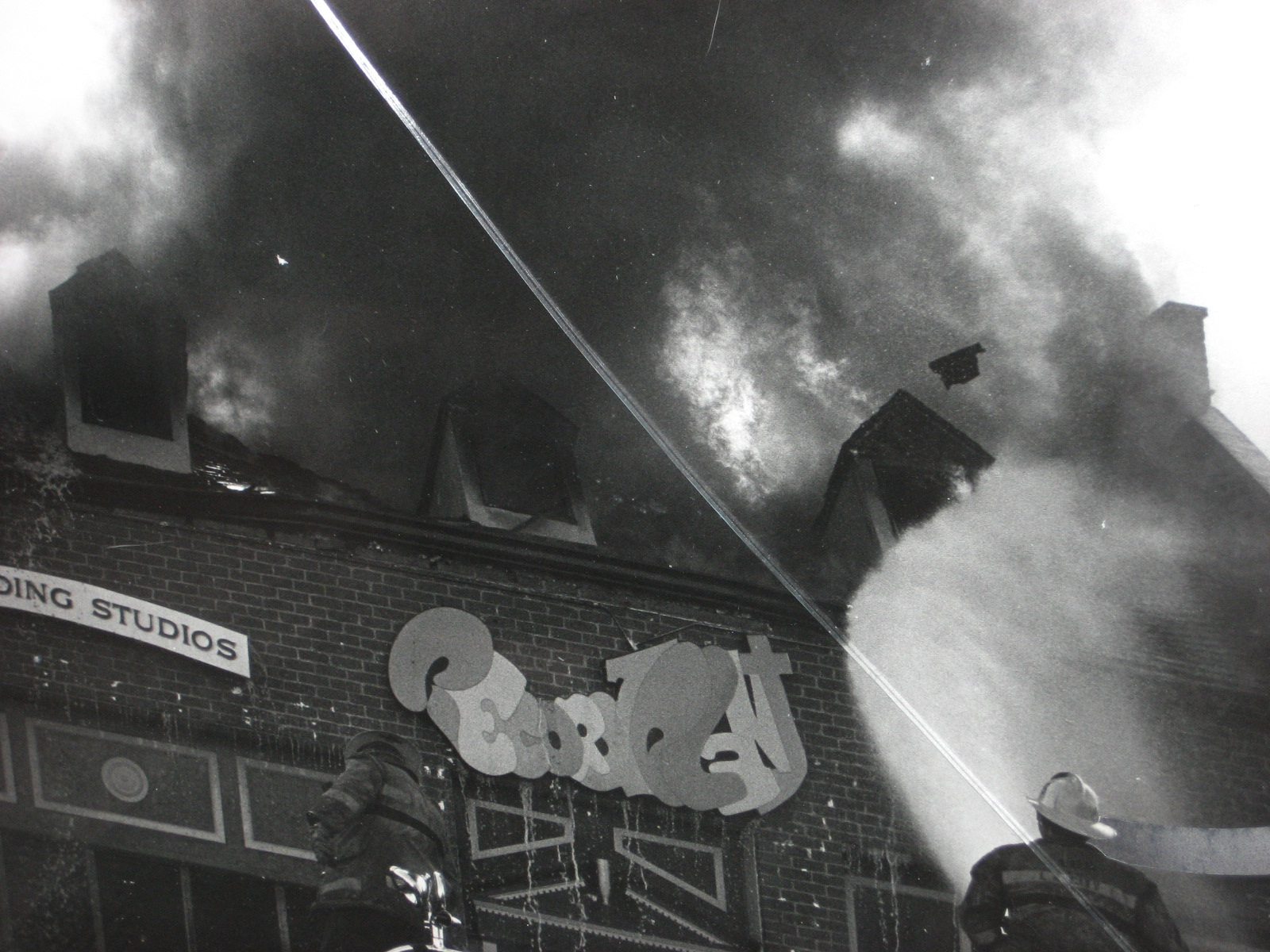
Studio C was destroyed by fire in January 1978.

Studio C was destroyed in an electrical fire on January 10, 1978. At the time, rocker Marshall Chapman was working with producer Al Kooper and bassist Tom Comet in Studio B on her album Jaded Virgin and helped other musicians and engineers carry priceless master recordings to safety outside the building. She said, "We might as well have been rescuing Rembrandts from the Louvre...I remember seeing 'Hotel California' [marked] on one, and 'John Lennon' on another. I nearly fainted when I saw I was holding a box containing the master tape from Stevie Wonder's Songs in the Key of Life."

During the next 13 months, Studio C was rebuilt and fitted with radical new gear. In February 1979, Stephen Stills became the first major-label American artist to record on digital recording and mastering equipment, a 3M system installed to replace the previous analog system. With engineer Michael Braunstein at the controls, Stills recorded a new version of the song "Cherokee", previously released on his first solo album Stephen Stills.

The L.A. operation expanded further in the early 1980s by equipping more remote recording trucks. In 1982, Stone leased sound stages M and L at the Paramount Pictures studio lot for film sound recordings. Soundtracks that the Record Plant tracked and mixed there included Star Trek II: The Wrath of Khan, Annie, 48 Hrs., and An Officer and a Gentleman. The studio was outgrowing its Third Street location.

In 1985, the Record Plant's Third Street facility closed with hundreds of its customers and staff taking part in "The Last Jam". In January 1986, the Record Plant reopened at 1032 Sycamore Avenue in Hollywood in the former Radio Recorders "Annex", a historic studio where Elvis Presley and Louis Armstrong recorded.

On December 8, 1987, Stone sold 50% plus one share of the Los Angeles studio to Chrysalis Records under George Martin, with Stone continuing to manage the facility. In 1989, Stone sold the remainder and left it under Chrysalis management. In 1991, Rick Stevens, ex-president of Summa Music Group publishing, bought the Record Plant; he refurbished it in 1993. Stevens added private lounges and an atrium with a jacuzzi and a billiard table lit by skylight.

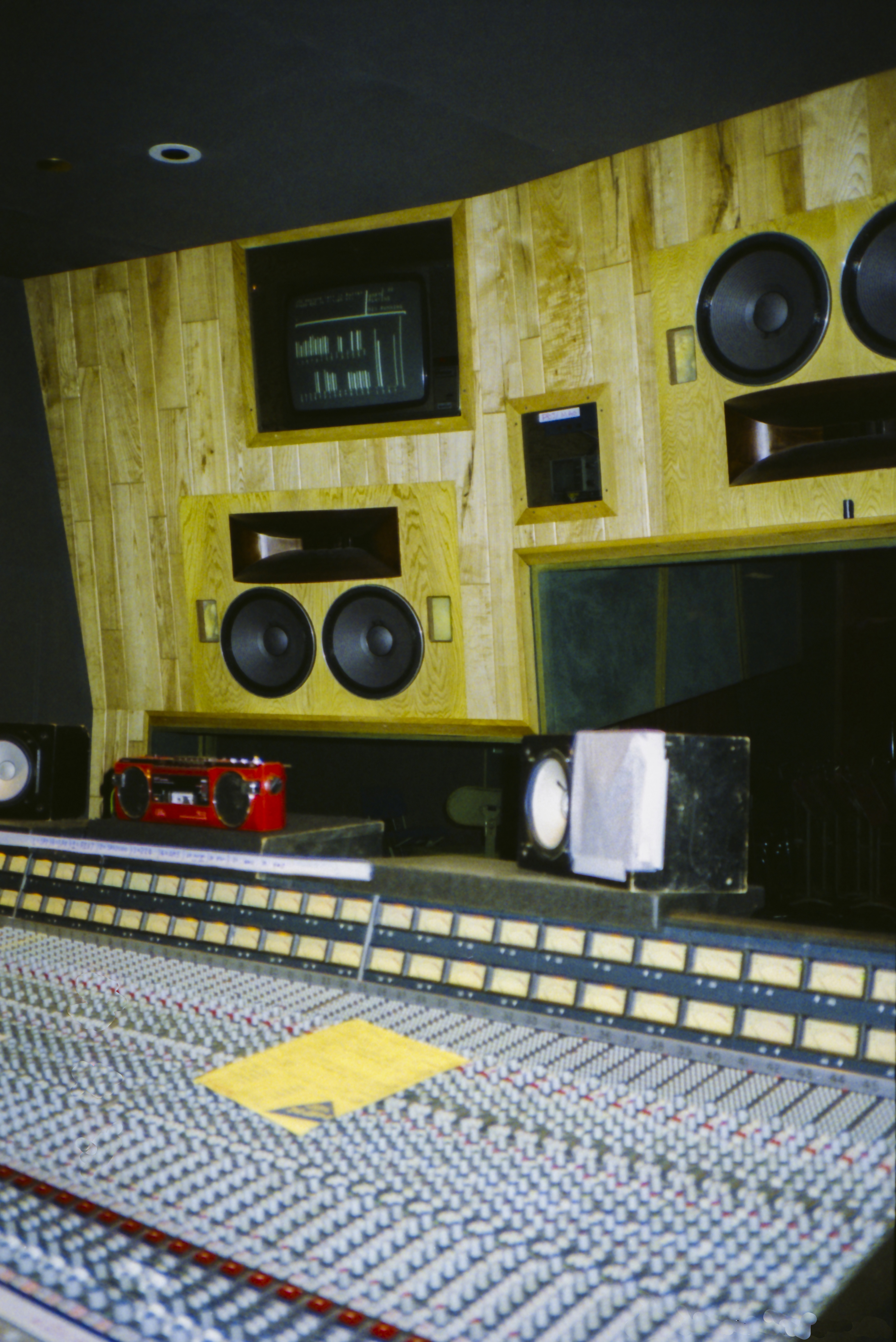
The studio's control room in 1988

In 2002, hip-hop artist Kanye West recorded his song "Through the Wire" at Record Plant, two weeks after a widely publicized car accident in which he was also driving home from the studio. The title and content of the song is a reference to the personal journey he faced after the accident, as well as the fact that he performed his lyrics with his jaw wired shut. The album the song was featured on, The College Dropout, as well as his next two albums, Late Registration and Graduation were also recorded at Record Plant.

In 2006, American artist Beyoncé recorded the songs "Green Light" and "Kitty Kat", in addition to parts of the song "Déjà Vu", from her second album B'Day at the Plant. In 2010, Beyoncé recorded parts of her 4 album at Record Plant. In 2013, although no songs recorded at Record Plant made it onto her self-titled album, she recorded the song "7/11" at the Plant, which she later released on Beyoncé: Platinum Edition. In 2015, Beyoncé recorded parts of her Lemonade album at Record Plant, including the songs "Hold Up" (which she later released as the album's third single) and "6 Inch" featuring the Weeknd.

The Los Angeles studio ceased operations in July 2024, making it the last facility still operating under the Record Plant name.

== Sausalito ==
On October 28, 1972, Kellgren and Stone opened the Northern California location in Sausalito, throwing a Halloween party to celebrate Studio A going online. Ginger Mews, ex-manager of Wally Heider Studios, was named studio manager of Record Plant, and construction continued on the similarly equipped Studio B with completion expected in February 1973. The 10,700-square-foot (990 m^{2}) building was a former office suite covered with diagonal redwood siding in an industrial park near Sausalito's harbor facilities. The legal corporation was named Sausalito Music Factory, doing business in Los Angeles and Sausalito as the Record Plant.

Kellgren worked with Hidley to design Studio A and Studio B to have the same size and the same "dead" acoustics and both were fitted with Hidley-designed Westlake monitors. Studio A was decorated with a sunburst pattern on the wall and white fabric draped from the ceiling. Studio B was more vibrant to the eye, having many multi-colored fabric layers on the ceiling and swirls of color on the walls. Kellgren and Stone sent party invitations out on slabs of redwood; among the guests were John Lennon and Yoko Ono, who both showed up dressed as trees.

The first recording was under producer Al Schmitt, who brought in Mike Finnigan and Jerry Wood as Finnigan & Wood, recording the album Crazed Hipsters. When Studio B went online, engineer Tom Flye went to California from New York and ran the room; his first customer was New Riders of the Purple Sage, who recorded The Adventures of Panama Red. Flye also helped Sly and the Family Stone make their album Fresh.

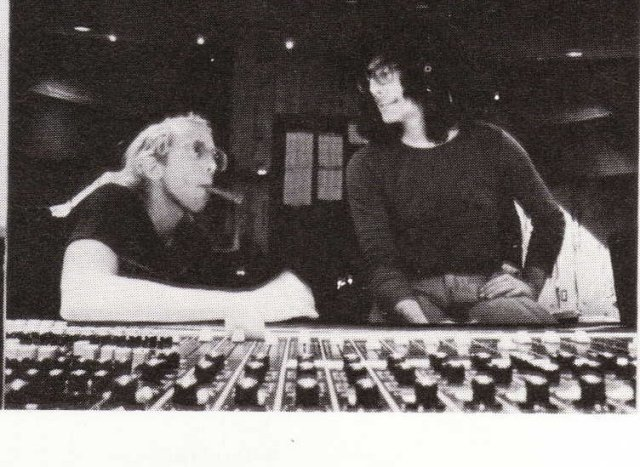
Guitarist Bob Welch and producer Jimmy Robinson at the Record Plant in 1979

The expansion into Sausalito was the result of drummer Buddy Miles and radio pioneer Tom "Big Daddy" Donahue asking Kellgren and Stone to put a studio in the San Francisco Bay Area. The intention was to have a getaway studio far from the pressures of the big city music industry. Miles and Donahue promised that their recording business would go to the new studio and that it would be promoted with a live radio show. "Live From the Plant", the resulting radio show, was broadcast on Donahue's album-oriented rock station KSAN from time to time over the next two years, primarily on Sunday nights, and featured various artists such as the Grateful Dead, Jerry Garcia, the Tubes, Peter Frampton, Bob Marley and the Wailers, Pablo Cruise, Rory Gallagher, the Marshall Tucker Band, Jimmy Buffett, Bonnie Raitt, Link Wray, Linda Ronstadt and Fleetwood Mac.

KSAN, known as "Jive 95", was the most popular radio station for Bay Area listeners from 18 to 34 years old and the Record Plant broadcasts were widely heard. Donahue died in April 1975 after which fewer concerts were broadcast. A notable later radio show was by Nils Lofgren and his band with a guest appearance by Al Kooper; they performed at the Record Plant's Halloween party in 1975.

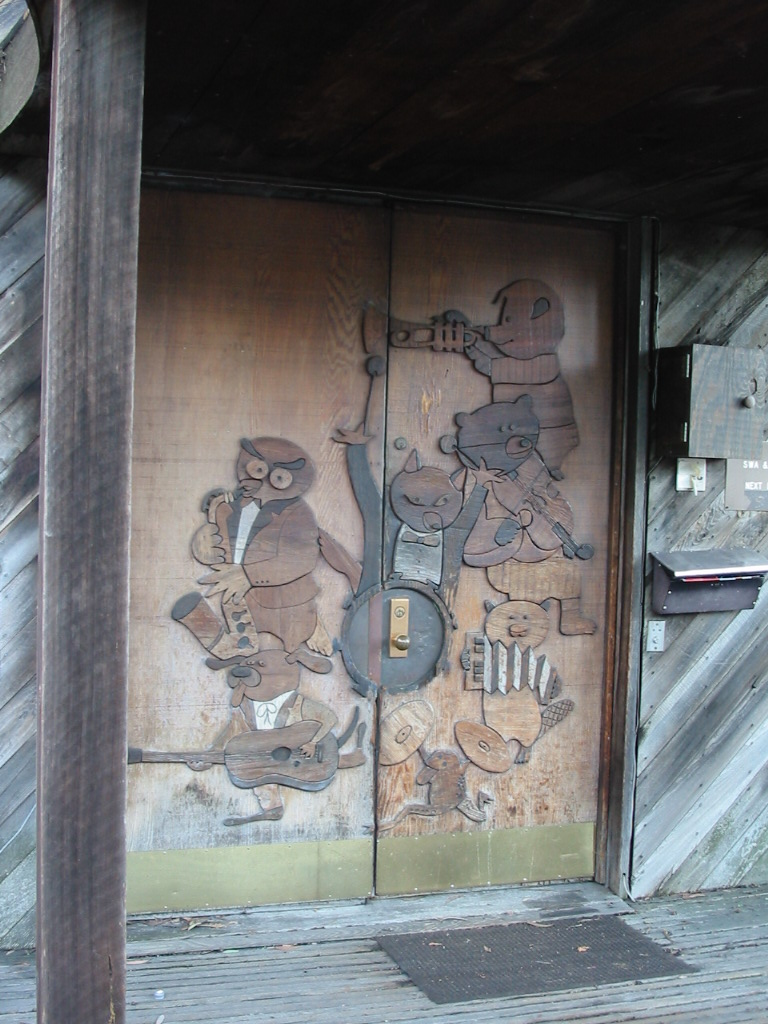
Detail of the front door, showing whimsical animal musicians

The Record Plant in Sausalito soon became known as one of the top four recording studios in the San Francisco Bay Area, the other three being the CBS/Automatt (now defunct), Wally Heider Studios (now Hyde Street Studios) and Fantasy Studios in Berkeley. In the first year, the studio worked on projects by Buddy Miles, the Grateful Dead (who booked the whole building in August 1973 to record Wake of the Flood), and on Gregg Allman's first solo album, Laid Back.

The quirkiness of the studio extended in many directions. For transporting musicians, Stone owned a limousine with the custom license plate DEDUCT, while Kellgren kept a purple Rolls-Royce displaying GREED on the license plate. As in Los Angeles, the studio contained a jacuzzi, but Sausalito's conference room had a waterbed floor. For the musicians' meals, there were chefs ready to cook organic food; for their sleeping quarters, there were two guesthouses next to each other five minutes away in Mill Valley. In back, there was a basketball hoop and in the nearby harbor, a speedboat was kept ready.

The studio obtained industrial-grade nitrous oxide—pure, not mixed with oxygen as it is for dental anesthesia—from a local chemical supply company under the pretext that the gas was critical to the recording process, and fresh tanks were delivered weekly. The Grateful Dead and their engineer, Dan Healy, reportedly made use of this feature.

Al Kooper wrote that during the few days that he was helping Lofgren lay down tracks for Cry Tough, Kooper was so taken with the novel drug experience that he wheeled one of the tanks around and kept it next to him for refreshment between takes. He breathed in so much of it that acid collected in his stomach, aggravating his ulcers, and for a few days he was too sick to work. Kooper said that the studio's fun with nitrous oxide was stopped forever when a friend of Kellgren was found dead from asphyxia under one of the tanks, the tube still in his mouth.

=== The Pit ===
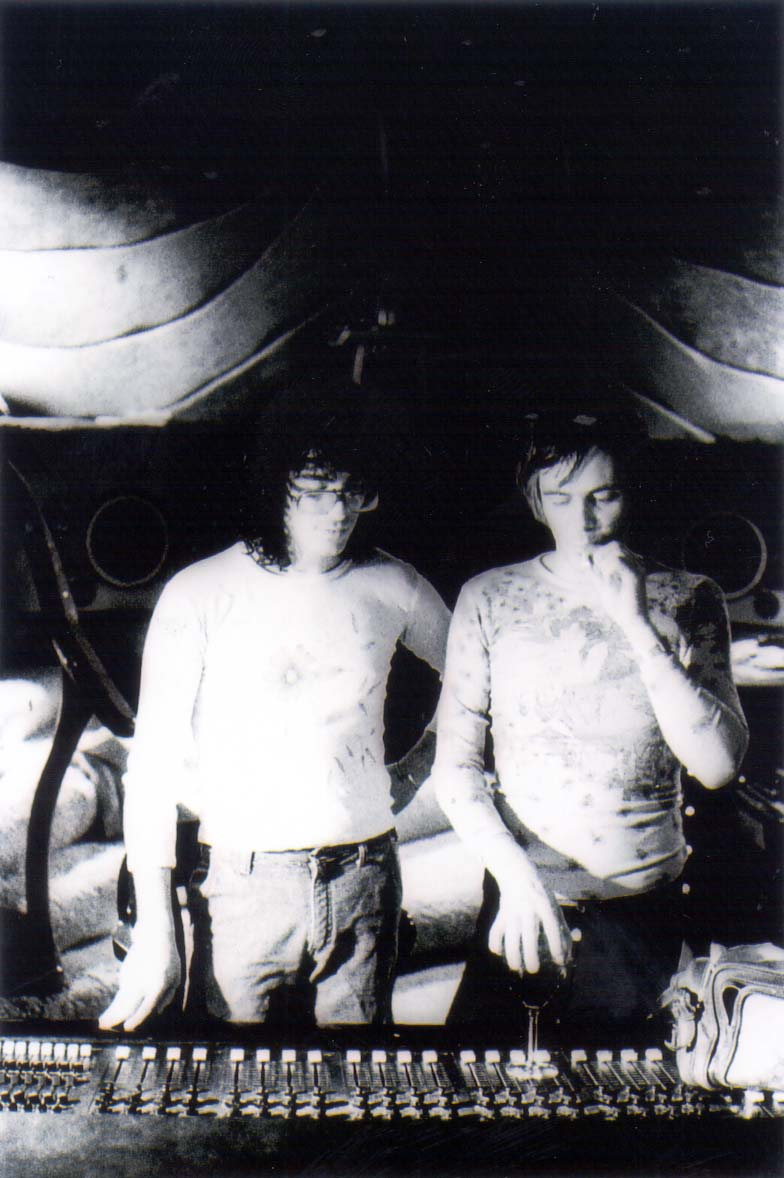
Jimmy Robinson and Gary Kellgren in the "Pit" in 1975

To satisfy the wishes of Sly Stone, one of the office spaces at the studio was turned into an unusual recording studio dubbed "the Pit". The Pit was a 140-square-foot (13 m^{2}) acoustically dead room that had the engineer's controls sunk 10 feet (3.0 m) into the foundation of the building, surrounded on all sides by a ground level area intended for the musicians. Its appearance was futuristic, with bright maroon plush carpet on the floors, walls, ceiling and stairs. Psychedelic murals and embroidery added to the visual atmosphere.

There were no windows between the control room and the main studio area, previously considered a fundamental method of sound separation; instead, there was a partial cowling circling the control pit, also carpeted. A bunk bed was accessible from the perimeter of the Pit, reached only by climbing through a giant pair of red lips. At the head of the bed, audio jacks allowed for microphones to be connected to the console in the Pit so that an artist could vocalize from under the covers. Guitarist Bob Welch wrote that "it really was the height of '70s 'over-the-top-ness'."

Al Kooper said "it looked like something out of Thunderdome." Jack Bruce thought it was decorated to look like a human heart, "with all kinds of red, synthetic fur on the walls." Stone recorded in it from time to time, but mostly it remained an unused curiosity, a "white elephant" according to producer Jimmy Robinson, a room that new arrivals were shown to elicit an "oh wow, what a trip" response. The separation between engineer and musician frustrated Stone and he recorded as much as possible down in the actual pit next to the engineers, lowering a Hammond B3 organ into the pit for his own use or positioning the members of a horn section there.

Kellgren said it was like a Ferrari in that you had to know what you were doing in order to drive it. In late August 1975, Kellgren flew up from L.A. with bassist Bill Wyman, who had just finished a major tour with the Rolling Stones. In the Pit, Wyman jammed with Van Morrison, who played saxophone; guitarist Joe Walsh; former CSNY drummer Dallas Taylor; pianist Leon Russell; and the Tower of Power horn section. Some of the tracks contributed to Wyman's solo album Stone Alone. Wyman laid down his vocal tracks from a lying-down position, a bottle of brandy in his hand.

=== Mid- to late-1970s ===
In 1975, the Record Plant's hourly rate was $120. Stevie Wonder worked on Songs in the Key of Life in Record Plant Sausalito; Sammy Hagar used the Pit to record tracks his debut solo album Nine on a Ten Scale, and the Tower of Power cut In the Slot. Pure Prairie League recorded; Bob Welch's band, Paris, made Paris; and America produced Hearts. Remote recordings were made by Record Plant crews and gear for Dan Fogelberg, Sly Stone, Joe Walsh and the New Riders of the Purple Sage.

In February 1976, for the album that became Rumours, Fleetwood Mac blocked time at the studio to lay down tracks, bringing in engineers Ken Caillat and Richard Dashut. Caillat was responsible for most of the tracking and took a leave of absence from Wally Heider Studios in L.A. on the premise that Fleetwood Mac would use their facilities for mixing. Most band members complained about the windowless studio and wanted to record at their homes, but Mick Fleetwood blocked this. The band used Studio B with its 3M 24-track tape machine, various studio microphones and an API mixing console with 550A equalizers. Although Caillat was impressed with the setup, he felt that the room lacked ambiance because of its "very dead speakers" and large amounts of soundproofing. Fleetwood remarked of his time at the studio that his band did not go into the Pit, as it was usually occupied by strangers who were chopping powdered drugs into lines with razors.

In late 1977, 19-year-old Prince recorded his debut album, For You, in Record Plant Sausalito while renting a home nearby. He performed every instrument, every track and produced the album. He spent three times his allotted budget to make this first record, and responded defensively when more experienced producers made suggestions in the studio. At the Record Plant, he met Stone, Chaka Khan and Carlos Santana, three musicians he greatly admired. For You was criticized as over-produced and did not sell well.

Fleetwood Mac's Rumours went platinum in 1977. The band Pablo Cruise recorded two platinum-certified albums at the Record Plant, A Place in the Sun (1977) and Worlds Away (1978). Cory Lerios, keyboardist and vocalist for Pablo Cruise, said that in recording "the better part of four albums" at the Record Plant, drug use enabled jam sessions that could last up to 36 hours. "It was a great time, no question," Lerios said. Another platinum album that came out of Record Plant Sausalito in 1978 was Dan Fogelberg's Twin Sons of Different Mothers, a collaboration with Tim Weisberg on flute. Other albums did less well: Jimmy Cliff laid down the tracks for Give Thankx in Jamaica, but he came to Record Plant Sausalito to polish it up, with producers Bob Johnston and John Stronach giving guidance. Cliff loved the studio's laid-back atmosphere and said Give Thankx was his best work yet. The album did not chart.

=== 1980s ===
Singer, composer and producer Rick James became a fixture at the Record Plant beginning in mid-1981. He recorded all of Street Songs in Studios A and B and it went multiple platinum, driven by its hit songs "Super Freak" and "Give It to Me Baby". James was known both for his quick work to create songs in the studio and his high level of cocaine consumption. For a time, James lived in the conference room with the waterbed floor.

Jim Gaines said that with James in residence, "bands that weren't even recording would come by just to see who was there and say 'hi'." James was known for walking through other artists' recording sessions wearing only a towel and sometimes dropping the towel for effect "in front of all the women," according to Gaines. Studio manager Shiloh Hobel said that Sly Stone made an appearance, meeting James for the first time. She said, "It was such an incredible moment, these two fabulous forces in music...Each of them was really taken with the other."

In 1981, Chris Stone sold the Record Plant Sausalito studio to Laurie Necochea. Necochea was a music fan who, as a teenager in 1978, received a $5.6 million malpractice settlement for being radiated too much during treatment for thyroid cancer, causing paralysis and quadriplegia. Stone said of the sale, "she bought Record Plant Sausalito because if she owned the studio she could go backstage at concerts."

The Record Plant Sausalito studio was managed by Steve Malcolm and Bob Hodas until 1982. The studio business became known as "The Plant Studios" or simply "The Plant". In 1982, Necochea funded two new Trident TSM mixing consoles for Studios A and B. In order to accommodate the hard rock band 707, studio manager and chief technician Terry Delsing redesigned and ordered extensive acoustic modifications to Studio A. This included adding louvered ceiling panels to control the reverberation characteristics. Studio B's control room was enlarged from 1,500 to 1,850 square feet (139 to 172 m^{2}) and a new studio monitoring system was installed, the Meyer Sound Laboratories ACD, John Meyer's first loudspeaker product. Rick James was the first artist to use the refurbished Studio B. Huey Lewis and the News made their hugely successful album Sports primarily at the Plant.

=== Changes in management and ownership; lawsuit ===
In early 1984, the Necochea Trust determined that the money going to the Plant was being mishandled and they sold the property to Stanley Jacox. Necochea died a year later at age 23. Jacox selected Jim Gaines as general manager; Gaines was a Stax/Volt veteran and a past manager of the Automatt. The small rehearsal room that had been the Pit was turned into Studio C, first used by John Fogerty to record Centerfield. Some of the tracks for Aretha Franklin's Who's Zoomin' Who? were laid down at the Plant under the direction of Narada Michael Walden. Engineer Maureen Droney said that "there was an aura of magic and fun that came from the people who recorded there before."

Accompanying famous artists, a series of experienced engineers and producers came through the Plant: Tom Dowd, Bill Schnee, Alan Parsons, Ron Nevison, Mike Clink and Ted Templeman. In 1985, with projects in progress by Heart, Journey, Starship and Huey Lewis, the studio was seized by government agents based on an affidavit accusing Jacox of manufacturing methamphetamines at his home in Auburn and investing drug money in the studio.

After Jacox's arrest, the Record Plant Sausalito studio was owned by the federal government, who ran it with a skeleton crew for 14 months. Some observers jokingly called it "Club Fed" during this time, and among the recordings are unreleased tapes made by Buddy Miles known as the Club Fed Sessions. The government sold the studio (not the building or property) at auction to recording engineer Bob Skye in 1986, effective on the first day of 1987. In 1988, Skye recruited recording engineer Arne Frager as a partner and Frager bought him out in late 1993. Frager remodeled Studio A for Metallica and producer Bob Rock in 1993–1995, raising the roof from 14 to 32 feet (4.3 to 9.8 m) high for a bigger drum sound. The remodeling included the installation of an SSL 4000 G series console. He gave Studio B a vintage desk, a Neve 8068 with 64 inputs and GML Automation, purchased from the L.A. Record Plant.

The former Pit/Studio C, renamed Mix 1, was given an SSL 8000 G series board for stereo and surround sound mixes. The sunken control area that had been created for the Pit was fitted with custom subwoofers. Mix 1 was eventually renamed "the Garden", an oval-shaped mix room designed by Frager and Manny LaCarruba. The Garden was a reverse-design studio where the larger tracking room was the new control room and the old control room was used for overdubs. Metallica's S&M was mixed in the Garden. Recording artists who worked at the Plant during this period include Sammy Hagar, Kenny G, Mariah Carey, Michael Bolton, Luther Vandross, Jerry Harrison, Chris Isaak, the Dave Matthews Band, Papa Wheelie, Deftones and Booker T. Jones. Santana's huge comeback album, Supernatural, was made at the Plant and released in 1999. In 2007, Journey returned to the Plant with a new singer, Arnel Pineda, to create Revelation, their biggest album in over two decades.

In 2005, vintage guitar collector Michael Indelicato bought the building, with Frager continuing to run the studios, but large recording studios were no longer profiting from 1970s- and 1980s-era recording budgets. Bob Welch once observed, "You had to have a major-label budget to afford places like the Record Plant, with all of the perks – the Jacuzzi, the decor, the psychedelic atmosphere".

By the 2000s, bands were using their smaller budgets to buy their own recording equipment. Metallica, formerly an important client, built their own recording studio and did not book any time at the Plant. Frager asked Indelicato to invest in what he saw as a much-needed rejuvenation of the building, but Indelicato was overextended in his finances and could not help. Indelicato shut the doors in March 2008 after the Fray finished recording in studio B. Shortly thereafter, Indelicato's $5.5 million home in Tiburon was reclaimed by his mortgage company and he used the Plant as his residence.

== Sausalito facility reopening, and legal action regarding historic name ==
In March 2020, the Record Plant, Sausalito was purchased by a group of investors, spearheaded by Ken Caillat, the co-producer of Fleetwood Mac's Rumours at the Record Plant. On June 19, 2021, the Record Plant Sausalito's soft launch, its name was officially changed to the Record Factory.

Following court claims by a legal entity purporting to represent the mark holders for Record Plant Sausalito, in 2024 the site opened for business rebranded under the name "2200 Studios".

== Selected list of albums recorded at Record Plant New York (by year) ==
- Soft Machine: The Soft Machine – 1968
- The Jimi Hendrix Experience: Electric Ladyland – 1968
- NRBQ: NRBQ – 1968
- James Gang: James Gang Rides Again – 1970
- Mountain: Climbing! – 1970
- Sly and the Family Stone: There's a Riot Goin' On – 1971
- Don McLean: American Pie – 1971
- Alice Cooper: School's Out – 1972
- Flo & Eddie: Flo & Eddie – 1972
- Return to Forever: Hymn of the Seventh Galaxy – 1973
- New York Dolls: New York Dolls – 1973
- Elliott Murphy: Aquashow – 1973
- The Allman Brothers Band: Brothers and Sisters – 1973
- The Isley Brothers: 3 + 3 – 1973
- Jonathan Edwards: Have a Good Time for Me – 1973
- Stevie Wonder: Innervisions – 1973
- Kansas: Kansas – 1973
- Aerosmith: Get Your Wings – 1974
- Three Dog Night: Hard Labor – 1974
- Lou Reed: Rock 'n' Roll Animal – 1974 (live remote recording)
- Return to Forever: No Mystery – 1975
- Bruce Springsteen: Born to Run – 1975
- Artful Dodger: Honor Among Thieves – 1975
- Aerosmith: Toys in the Attic – 1975
- Outlaws: Outlaws – 1975
- Eric Clapton: EC Was Here – 1975 (live remote recording)
- Kiss: Destroyer – 1976
- Patti Smith Group: Radio Ethiopia – 1976
- Johnny Hartman: Johnny Hartman, Johnny Hartman – 1976
- Moxy: Ridin' High – 1977
- Cheap Trick: Cheap Trick – 1977
- Kiss: Love Gun – 1977
- Blue Öyster Cult: Spectres – 1977
- Jackson Browne: Running on Empty – 1977 (live remote recording)
- Patti Smith Group: Easter – 1977
- Bruce Springsteen: Darkness on the Edge of Town – 1978
- Blondie: Parallel Lines – 1978
- Golden Earring: Grab It for a Second – 1978
- Prince: For You – 1978 (debut album)
- After the Fire: Laser Love – 1979
- Jefferson Starship: Freedom at Point Zero – 1979
- Neil Young: Rust Never Sleeps – 1979
- Garland Jeffreys: American Boy & Girl – 1979
- David Bowie: Lodger – 1979
- Kiss: Dynasty – 1979
- Talking Heads: Fear of Music – 1979
- Joan Armatrading: Me Myself I – 1980
- Holly and the Italians: The Right to Be Italian – 1980
- Kiss: Unmasked – 1980
- John Lennon and Yoko Ono: Double Fantasy – 1980
- Iggy Pop: Soldier – 1980 (mixing)
- Jim Steinman: Bad for Good – 1981
- Simon & Garfunkel: The Concert in Central Park – 1981 (live remote recording)
- The Rolling Stones: Still Life – 1981 (live remote recording)
- Jefferson Starship: Modern Times – 1981
- After the Fire: Batteries Not Included – 1982
- After the Fire: "Der Kommissar" – 1982 (single)
- Cyndi Lauper: She's So Unusual – 1983
- Jefferson Starship: Nuclear Furniture – 1984
- Prince: Purple Rain – 1984 (live remote recording)
- Cock Robin: Cock Robin – 1985
- Journey: Raised on Radio – 1986
- U2: Rattle and Hum – 1988 (live remote recording)
- Raging Slab: Raging Slab – 1989
- Beastie Boys: Paul's Boutique – 1989
- Neil Young: Freedom – 1989
- Guns N' Roses: Use Your Illusion I and Use Your Illusion II – 1991
- Guns N' Roses: "The Spaghetti Incident?" – 1993

== Producers and engineers associated with Record Plant New York ==
- Tony Bongiovi (house engineer)
- Roy Cicala (house engineer)
- Ray Colcord (producer)
- Jack Douglas (producer)
- Lillian Davis Douma (a.k.a. Llyllianne Douma; house engineer, New York/Los Angeles)
- Sam Ginsberg (house engineer)
- Phil Gitomer (remote truck engineer)
- David Hewitt (remote engineer, director of remote recording, 1972–1985)
- Jimmy Iovine (engineer, producer)
- Gary Kellgren (co-founder, producer, engineer)
- Harry Maslin (record producer, house engineer)
- Norman Mershon (remote truck engineer)
- Jay Messina (engineer)
- Ron Nevison (senior staff engineer, 1974–1977; producer – Los Angeles/Sausalito)
- Tommy Ramone (engineer)
- Jimmy Robinson (producer, engineer)
- Carmine Rubino (lead engineer)
- Mike D. Stone (engineer, New York/Los Angeles; Chris Stone's nephew)
- Sandy Stone (house engineer, maintenance)
- John L. Venable (remote truck engineer)
- Shelly Yakus (house engineer)
- Stan Vincent (producer / engineer)

== Selected list of albums recorded at Record Plant Los Angeles (by year) ==
- James Gang: James Gang Rides Again – 1970
- B.B. King: Indianola Mississippi Seeds – 1970
- Mountain: Flowers of Evil – 1971
- Black Sabbath: Black Sabbath Vol. 4 – 1972
- America: Homecoming – 1972
- The Isley Brothers: 3 + 3 – 1973
- Bee Gees: Life in a Tin Can – 1973
- America: Hat Trick – 1973
- Billy Joel: Piano Man – 1973
- Deep Purple: Stormbringer – 1974
- Eagles: On the Border – 1974
- Lynyrd Skynyrd: Second Helping – 1974
- Joe Walsh: So What – 1974
- Frank Zappa: One Size Fits All – 1974
- Frank Zappa: Bongo Fury – 1974
- Frank Zappa: Studio Tan – 1974
- Tom Waits: Nighthawks at the Diner – 1975
- The Tubes: The Tubes – 1975
- The Allman Brothers Band: Win, Lose or Draw – 1975
- Paris: Paris – 1976 (Recorded in Studio "C" in Los Angeles and the "Pit" in Sausalito)
- Boston: Boston – 1976
- Fleetwood Mac: Rumours – 1976
- Eagles: Hotel California – 1976
- Dave Mason: Let It Flow – 1977
- Supertramp: Even in the Quietest Moments... – 1977
- Peter Criss: Peter Criss – 1978
- Paul Stanley: Paul Stanley – 1978
- Cheap Trick: Heaven Tonight – 1978
- Moody Blues: Octave – 1978
- REO Speedwagon: You Can Tune a Piano, but You Can't Tuna Fish – 1978
- Cheap Trick: Dream Police – 1979
- Blue Öyster Cult: Mirrors – 1979
- Jefferson Starship: Freedom at Point Zero – 1979
- Devo: Freedom of Choice – 1980
- Survivor: Survivor – 1980
- Ozark Mountain Daredevils: Ozark Mountain Daredevils – 1980
- Chicago: Chicago XIV – 1980
- Rod Stewart: Foolish Behaviour – 1980
- Rod Stewart: Tonight I'm Yours – 1981
- Black Sabbath: Mob Rules – 1981
- Jefferson Starship: Modern Times – 1981
- Quarterflash: Quarterflash – 1981
- Village People: Renaissance - 1981
- Devo: New Traditionalists – 1981
- Kiss: Killers – 1982
- Fleetwood Mac: Mirage – 1982
- Tom Petty and the Heartbreakers: Long After Dark – 1982
- Kiss: Creatures of the Night – 1982
- Rod Stewart: Body Wishes – 1983
- Brian May + Friends: Star Fleet Project – 1983
- Queen: The Works – 1984
- Devo: Shout – 1984
- Survivor: Vital Signs – 1984
- Yngwie J. Malmsteen: Rising Force – 1984
- Rough Cutt: Rough Cutt – 1984
- Heart: Heart – 1985 (also in Sausalito)
- Twisted Sister: Come Out and Play – 1985
- Iron Maiden: Live After Death – 1985 (live remote recording, LA shows only, Long Beach Arena)
- Autograph: That's the Stuff – 1985
- Judas Priest: Turbo – 1986
- Andy Taylor: Thunder – 1987
- Suicidal Tendencies: Join the Army – 1987
- Guns N' Roses: Appetite for Destruction – 1987
- Rod Stewart: Out of Order – 1988
- Jefferson Airplane: Jefferson Airplane – 1989
- Beastie Boys: Paul's Boutique – 1989
- Whitesnake: Slip of the Tongue – 1989
- Crosby, Stills & Nash: Live It Up – 1990
- Stephen Stills: Stills Alone – 1991
- Danzig: Danzig III: How the Gods Kill – 1992
- Damn Yankees: Don't Tread – 1992
- Nine Inch Nails: The Downward Spiral – 1994
- Luis Miguel: Segundo Romance – 1994
- Tears for Fears: Raoul and the Kings of Spain – 1994
- Marilyn Manson: Portrait of an American Family – 1994
- Luis Miguel: Nada Es Igual – 1996
- Hole: Celebrity Skin – 1998
- Elton John & Tim Rice: The Road to El Dorado (soundtrack) – 2000
- Mushroomhead: XX – 2001
- Robbie Williams: Escapology – 2002
- Brandy: Afrodisiac – 2004
- Vanessa Carlton: Harmonium – 2004
- Kanye West: The College Dropout – 2004
- Kanye West: Late Registration – 2005
- Evanescence: The Open Door – 2006
- Ayumi Hamasaki: Secret – 2006
- Christina Aguilera: Back to Basics – 2006
- Beyoncé: B'Day – 2006
- Kanye West: Graduation – 2007
- will.i.am: Songs About Girls – 2007
- Ayumi Hamasaki: Guilty – 2008
- Lady Gaga: The Fame – 2008
- Ayumi Hamasaki: Next Level – 2009
- Amerie: In Love & War – 2009
- Lady Gaga: The Fame Monster – 2009
- Mos Def: The Ecstatic – 2009
- Britney Spears: Femme Fatale – 2011
- Beyoncé: 4 – 2011
- The Offspring: Days Go By – 2012
- Lady Gaga: ARTPOP – 2013
- Justin Bieber: Purpose – 2015
- Travis Scott: Birds in the Trap Sing McKnight – 2016
- Beyoncé: Lemonade – 2016
- Ariana Grande: Thank U, Next – 2019

== Selected list of albums recorded at Record Plant Sausalito (by year) ==
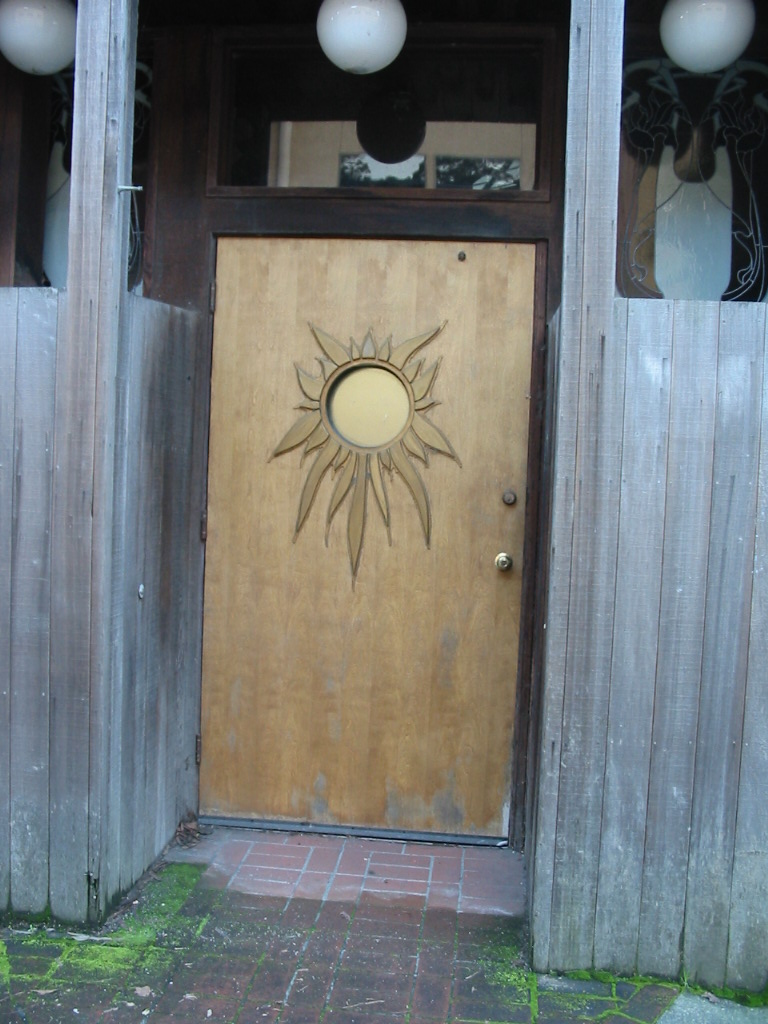
Side door, opens onto Marinship Way, across from the U.S. Army Corps of Engineers Bay Model

Some notable albums recorded and/or mixed at the Plant Studios include:

- Pharoah Sanders: Thembi – 1971
- New Riders of the Purple Sage: The Adventures of Panama Red – 1972
- Sly and the Family Stone: Fresh – 1973
- The Wailers: Talkin' Blues – 1973
- Grateful Dead: Wake of the Flood – 1973
- America: Hearts – 1975
- Paris: Paris – 1976
- Fleetwood Mac: Rumours – 1976 (finished at Wally Heider Studios, Sound City Studios, Los Angeles, California)
- Skyhooks: Straight in a Gay Gay World – 1976
- Stevie Wonder: Songs in the Key of Life – 1976
- Dan Fogelberg and Tim Weisberg: Twin Sons of Different Mothers – 1978
- Prince: For You – 1978
- Rick James: Fire It Up – 1979
- Rick James: Garden of Love – 1980
- Rick James: Street Songs – 1981 (also Motown/Hitsville U.S.A., Hollywood, California)
- Maze: Joy and Pain – 1980
- Marty Balin: Balin – 1981
- Huey Lewis and the News: Sports – 1983 (also Fantasy Studios, Berkeley, California and the Automatt, San Francisco, California)
- The Mary Jane Girls: Mary Jane Girls – 1983
- Grace Slick: Software – 1984
- Jefferson Starship: Nuclear Furniture – 1984
- Heart: Heart – 1985 (also Los Angeles)
- John Fogerty: Centerfield – 1985
- Huey Lewis and the News: Fore! – 1986
- Todd Rundgren: Nearly Human – 1989
- Queen Ida: Cookin' with Queen Ida – 1989
- Mother Love Bone: Apple – 1990
- Mariah Carey: Emotions – 1991
- Mariah Carey: Music Box – 1993
- The Verve Pipe: Villains – 1996
- Metallica: Load – 1996
- Metallica: ReLoad – 1997
- Joe Satriani: Crystal Planet – 1998
- Dave Matthews Band: Before These Crowded Streets – 1998
- Guster: Lost and Gone Forever – 1999
- Carlos Santana: Supernatural – 1999 (also Fantasy Studios, Berkeley, California)
- Third Eye Blind: Blue – 1999
- Deftones: White Pony – 2000
- Dave Matthews Band: Busted Stuff – 2002
- Papa Wheelie: Live Lycanthropy – 2002
- The Fray: The Fray – 2009
