= Baby Universal =

Song by Tin Machine

Single by Tin Machine

from the album Tin Machine II
- Released: 21 October 1991
- Recorded: Sydney September–November 1989; April 1990; September–October 1990; Los Angeles, March 1991; August 1996 (Earthling re-recorded version)
- Genre: Rock
- Length: 3:07
- Label: London; LON 310
- Songwriters: David Bowie, Reeves Gabrels
- Producers: Tin Machine, Tim Palmer

Tin Machine singles chronology
"You Belong in Rock n' Roll" (1991)	"Baby Universal" (1991)	"One Shot" (1991)

"Baby Universal" is a song by Anglo-American hard rock band Tin Machine, released as the second single from their Tin Machine II album in October 1991.

== Background and recording ==
Lead vocalist David Bowie and guitarist Reeves Gabrels originally recorded a demo of "Baby Universal" in 1988, prior to the actual formation of the band Tin Machine, but it was shelved for the first album after producer Tim Palmer suggested it might be "too catchy" for inclusion.

The single release was backed with tracks recorded at the band's BBC session recorded for Mark Goodier's radio show on 13 August 1991, and a live appearance on the BBC's Top of the Pops.

Bowie re-recorded "Baby Universal" in 1996 for his 1997 album Earthling, but it was not released on the album, instead eventually being released in 2020 as part of the EP Is it Any Wonder?.

Bowie biographer Nicholas Pegg noted that some of the lyrics from "Baby Universal", such as "chaos", "dust" and "hallo", and visions of a science fiction apocalypse were recycled for Bowie's and Gabrel's "Hallo Spaceboy" (1996).

== Live performances ==
"Baby Universal" was performed live by Tin Machine during their 1991-92 It's My Life Tour, and by Bowie during his Outside Tour in 1996. A recording from the former appears on the live video release of Tin Machine Live: Oy Vey, Baby (1992).

== Track listing ==
7" version

1. "Baby Universal" (David Bowie, Reeves Gabrels) – 3:07
2. "You Belong in Rock 'n' Roll" (Extended version) (Bowie, Gabrels) – 6:32

12" version

1. "Baby Universal" (Extended version) (Bowie, Gabrels) – 5:49
2. "A Big Hurt (BBC version)" (Bowie) – 3:33
3. "Baby Universal" (BBC version) (Bowie, Gabrels) – 3:12

CD version

1. "Baby Universal" (7" version) (Bowie, Gabrels) – 3:07
2. "Stateside" (BBC version) (Hunt Sales) – 6:35
3. "If There Is Something" (BBC version) (Bryan Ferry) – 3:25
4. "Heaven's in Here" (BBC version) (Bowie) – 6:41
- A "special edition" version of the CD single was released in a tin can container

Japan CD version

1. "Baby Universal" (7" version) (Bowie, Gabrels) – 3:07
2. "Amlapura" (Indonesian version) (Bowie, Gabrels) – 3:53
3. "Shakin' All Over" (live) (Kidd) – 2:49
4. "Baby Universal" (Extended version) (Bowie, Gabrels) – 5:49

US promo CD version

1. "Baby Universal" (7" version) (Bowie, Gabrels) – 3:07
2. "Baby Universal" (Extended version) (Bowie, Gabrels) – 5:49
3. "Baby Universal" (BBC version) (Bowie, Gabrels) – 3:12
4. "Stateside" (BBC version) (Sales) – 6:35

== Credits and personnel ==
Producers

- Tin Machine
- Tim Palmer

Musicians

- David Bowie – vocals, guitar
- Reeves Gabrels – lead guitar
- Hunt Sales – drums, vocals
- Tony Sales – bass, vocals
- Kevin Armstrong (guitarist) – rhythm guitar

== Charts ==
Chart (1991)	Peak Position
UK Airplay (Music Week)	35
US Alternative Songs (Billboard)	30
US Mainstream Rock Tracks (Billboard)	21
