= Tin Machine II =

- The unedited British cover

Studio album by Tin Machine
- Released: 2 September 1991
- Recorded: 1989–1990; March 1991
- Studios: Studios 301 (Sydney); A&M (Hollywood)
- Genres: Hard rock; art rock; blues
- Length: 49:07
- Label: Victory
- Producers: Tin Machine; Tim Palmer; Hugh Padgham

Tin Machine chronology
Tin Machine (1989)	Tin Machine II (1991)	Tin Machine Live: Oy Vey, Baby (1992)

Singles from Tin Machine II
- 1. "You Belong in Rock n' Roll" Released: 12 August 1991; 2. "Baby Universal" Released: 21 October 1991; 3. "One Shot" Released: November 1991 (EU)

US album cover
- The American cover, with the Kouroi's penises airbrushed out

Tin Machine II is the second and final studio album by the Anglo-American rock band Tin Machine, released on 2 September 1991 through Victory Music. The band, composed of David Bowie, Reeves Gabrels on guitar and brothers Tony Fox and Hunt Sales on bass and drums, respectively, recorded it in Sydney, Australia, in late 1989 at the conclusion of the Tin Machine Tour. After Bowie completed his solo Sound+Vision Tour in late 1990, recording resumed in Los Angeles, California, until March 1991. The production was handled by Tin Machine and Tim Palmer, who produced their debut studio album (1989), with additional production by Hugh Padgham on "One Shot". While the album musically retains a hard rock sound, the songs are more melodic compared to its predecessor, with lyrics focusing on love.

The cover artwork features four Greek Kouroi and was controversial in the US due to the statues' genitalia. Tin Machine II received mostly mixed reviews from music critics, with many highlighting individual tracks but considering the project as a whole mediocre. Some recognised it as an improvement over Tin Machine. Supported by three singles, the album peaked at number 23 in the UK and number 126 in the US. The band's accompanying It's My Life Tour received mixed reviews; a live album from the tour, Tin Machine Live: Oy Vey, Baby, was released in 1992. At the tour's completion, Tin Machine disbanded and Bowie resumed his solo career, releasing his eighteenth studio album, Black Tie White Noise (1993). Gabrels remained Bowie's collaborator for the rest of the 1990s. Bowie's biographers have given Tin Machine II mixed reactions, with most recognising it as inconsistent in quality and panning two tracks sung by Hunt Sales. The album was reissued for the first time in 2020 on both vinyl and CD.

== Background ==
Tin Machine was formed in 1988 by David Bowie, who was at an artistic low point and looking to revitalise his career. The completed lineup included American guitarist Reeves Gabrels and brothers Tony Fox and Hunt Sales on bass and drums, respectively; Kevin Armstrong acted as an additional guitarist. The band recorded their eponymous debut album in late 1988 with the producer Tim Palmer. Despite a clash in personalities between the Sales brothers and Gabrels, the sessions were extremely productive, with over 35 songs recorded in six weeks. The album's tracks were recorded raw and live with few overdubs to capture the energy of Tin Machine, resulting in a hard rock sound with lyrics discussing world issues and love.

The band were responded to with mixed reviews from critics. When promoting Tin Machine, Bowie made it clear to interviewers that the band were a democratic unit, with the biographer Nicholas Pegg calling it the mindset of "anyone wanting to interview David would get the rest of the band as well". This move would be written off by critics as a publicity stunt by an artist who is unsure of what he wants to do next. Released in May 1989, Tin Machine was met with mixed reviews and sold well at first but declined quickly. Some reviewers later noted that Tin Machine were exploring styles of grunge and alternative rock before those styles became popular. Like the album, the band's supporting Tin Machine Tour received mixed reviews. At the conclusion of the tour, Tin Machine took a break before reconvening in Australia in late 1989 to begin recording their next album.

== Recording and production ==
Recording for Tin Machine II began in September 1989 in Sydney, Australia, where the band spent three weeks recording new material. They maintained the lineup of Tin Machine, with Armstrong as an additional guitarist. Tin Machine played an impromptu show at a small Sydney venue on 4 November 1989 before taking a rest in January 1990 as Bowie conducted his solo Sound+Vision Tour, filmed a role in The Linguini Incident (1991) and made a brief appearance in the HBO series Dream On. The tour concluded in September 1990, after which Bowie announced his split with EMI. According to Pegg, EMI were continuously expecting another success equivalent of Let's Dance (1983) and became fed up with Bowie's uncommercial work as part of Tin Machine to the point where they refused to market another Tin Machine record, leading Bowie to depart. At the time, EMI were undertaking a reissue campaign with the American label Rykodisc of Bowie's back catalogue, which remained unaffected by the split.

In March 1991, Tin Machine signed with Victory Music, a newly formed record label created by the JVC corporation, with worldwide distribution by London Records and PolyGram. The same month, the band reconvened at A&M Studios in Los Angeles, California, to record three new tracks. The label requested a radio-friendly hit so Hugh Padgham, Bowie's co-producer for Tonight (1984), was hired to oversee work on the song "One Shot". Padgham told the biographer David Buckley that he was not a fan of Tin Machine's prior work, stating it "sounded like a mad bunch of people". Upon working with them, he praised Gabrels' guitar contributions but called the Sales brothers "basically mad". Tim Palmer, who produced their debut album, was brought back to produce and mix Tin Machine II.

Some tracks originated from the sessions for Tin Machine. Bowie and Gabrels had begun working on "Shopping for Girls" in August 1988 before the sessions began, while "If There Is Something", a Roxy Music cover, was the second song the band recorded after "Heaven's in Here". Bowie stated: "We were so exhausted that we didn't have it in us to write another song, so we used an old song to show how we as a band would approach someone else's material." The song was then shelved and placed on Tin Machine II, with Bowie saying "we pulled it out to see how it sounded. We really got off on it."

== Music and lyrics ==
Gabrels considered the music of Tin Machine II to be "as aggressive as [its predecessor]", but found the songs more melodic. He told Rolling Stone in 1991: "Last time, we were screaming at the world. This time, I think, they're all love songs in a strange kind of way." The author James E. Perone agreed, calling the tracks more accessible than the debut, featuring more conventional hard rock sounds and less "incessant gloom". Nevertheless, Dave Thompson felt the band continued their "loud and rambunctious" sound, while the lyrics were "forthright and confrontational". Bill Wyman of Entertainment Weekly noted the presence of blues, hard rock, art rock and schmaltz, a sentiment echoed by The Economist. Perone finds certain tracks reminiscent of Bowie's prior work. He compares "You Belong in Rock n' Roll" to his work with the Spiders from Mars and the music of "Amlapura" to the folk rock on Bowie's 1969 album Space Oddity, although notes that the lyrics, which describe "images of dead children", are a lot darker than the material of that era.

Gabrels used greater experimentation on guitar for Tin Machine II, including the use of a vibrator on some tracks. He later stated that at the time, he was deeply into Nine Inch Nails' album Pretty Hate Machine (1989) and was looking for an industrial edge to his own guitar work for the album. Ultimately (after recording track after track of guitar noise), he found a "shard of guitar noise" that he liked and used it on "Shopping for Girls", a song about child prostitution in Thailand. Buckley notes that as a way to show the band to be a "democratic unit", Hunt Sales took lead vocals on two tracks, "Stateside" and "Sorry", the latter of which he wrote by himself. "Goodbye Mr. Ed" is lyrically a farewell to the title character of the television series Mister Ed, who was a talking horse. Perone compares the song's musical style to the 1970s work of the Jam and the 1960s work of the Who. Jon Pareles of The New York Times found the lyrics mostly focus on love, singling out "Baby Universal" and "Betty Wrong" as clear examples.

== Release and promotion ==
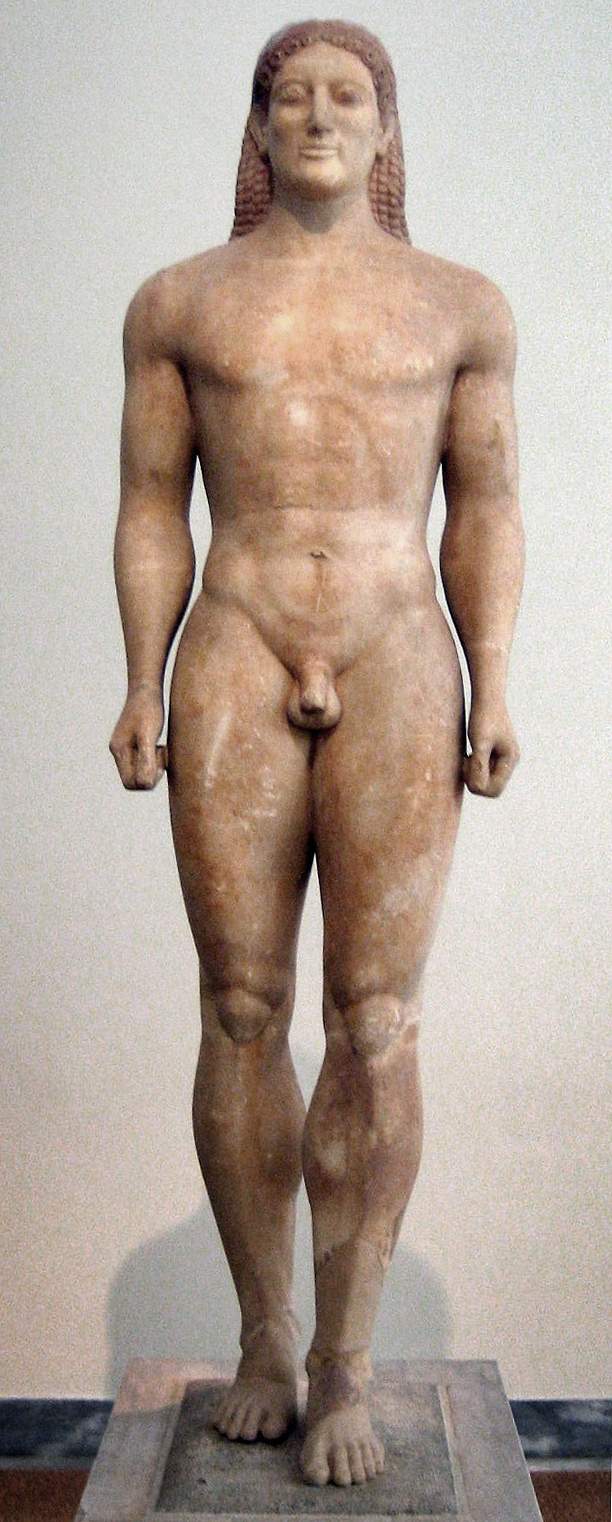
Bowie vocally opposed the US release's censorship of the album cover's Kouroi.

The cover artwork was created by Edward Bell, who previously created the artwork for Bowie's 1980 album Scary Monsters (and Super Creeps). It depicts four Kouroi—Greek statues dating to the sixth century BC—that represent individuals who lack identity, which Pegg believes encapsulates the "ethos" of Tin Machine. The British cover showed the statues' genitalia, but for the American release of Tin Machine II, the genitalia were airbrushed out. Bowie commented, "Only in America ... [...] Even Canada has the original cover!" He teased the idea of allowing American album-buyers to send away to Victory Music for the genitalia that were struck from their version of the cover, but the label balked. He said: "then [the fans] could paste them back on. But the label freaked out at the idea. Sending genitals through the mail is a serious offense." The back cover was a rear-view of the front cover with a torn photo of Sales' shoulders overlaid, which Pegg describes as similar to Scary Monsters.

Tin Machine II was released through Victory Music and London Records on 2 September 1991 on different LP and CD formats, (Note: Buckley gives the release date as 3 September 1991.) with the catalogue numbers 828 2721 and 828 2722, respectively. Its release coincided with Rykodisc's reissue of Bowie's Berlin Trilogy. The album peaked at number 23 on the UK Albums Chart, becoming Bowie's first album in nearly 20 years to not hit the UK top 20. It fared far worse in the US, peaking at number 126 on the Billboard Top Pop Albums chart. Like its predecessor, Tin Machine II was supported by three singles. The first, "You Belong in Rock n' Roll" backed by "Amlapura (Indonesian version)", was released on 12 August and peaked at number 33 on the UK Singles Chart. The second, "Baby Universal" backed by an extended version of "You Belong in Rock n' Roll", followed in October, which peaked at number 48 in the UK. The third and final single, "One Shot" backed by "Hammerhead", was issued the next month in other territories besides Britain.

Tin Machine supported the album with the seven-month It's My Life Tour, which started in October 1991 and concluded in February 1992. They recorded one show for fans on 1 September 1991 at the Los Angeles airport which was taped for broadcast in the US as part of the ABC In Concert series, aired on 6 September. The setlist for the tour included most of Tin Machine and all of Tin Machine II, with covers including the Pixies' "Debaser" (1989), Neil Young's "I've Been Waiting for You" (1968) and the Moody Blues' "Go Now" (1964). Reviews for the shows were mixed, with some complaining over the lack of Bowie's older hits. Following the release of the live album Tin Machine Live: Oy Vey, Baby in 1992, Tin Machine disbanded. Bowie married supermodel Iman in 1992 and resumed his solo career with Black Tie White Noise (1993); Gabrels remained his collaborator for the rest of the decade.

== Critical reception ==
Professional ratings
Review scores
Source	Rating
AllMusic	3/5 stars
Entertainment Weekly	C
Encyclopedia of Popular Music	2/5 stars
The Great Rock Discography	3/10
MusicHound Rock: The Essential Album Guide	"woof!"
Q	3/5 stars
Select	1/5
Spin Alternative Record Guide	1/10

Tin Machine II was met with mixed reviews from music critics on release. Adrian Deevoy of Q, in a review that asked "Are Tin Machine Crap?" on the cover, felt that the album does not "quite match up to their wonderfully overwrought but sadly under bought debut", while praising individual tracks such as "If There Was Something", "You Belong in Rock 'n' Roll" and "Shopping for Girls". In a more favourable review, Max Bell of Vox called the majority of the tracks "passable bordering on dull", concluding that it is "better than could have been expected". Wyman similarly called the album mediocre overall but praised certain tracks including "Goodbye Mr. Ed" and "You Belong in Rock n' Roll". He also recognised Tin Machine II as the "truer" collaboration for the band due to the more varied songwriting. Dave Cavanagh complained in Select that Tin Machine II was as "horrible a farrago of dreadful rock riffs, low-faultin' lyrics and bad guitar as its predecessor", while Jon Wilde of Melody Maker dismissed the album as "glorified pub rock" with "blunt-nosed" riffs, heavy metal elements and "incurable" guitar solos, and believed Bowie had become a "disgrace". (Note: In the Channel 4 documentary Bowie: The Final Act (2025), Wilde recalled being reprimanded for his review by senior staff at Melody Maker after they learnt Wilde's review had made Bowie cry.)

The album did receive some positive reviews. In Creem, Steve Appleford found Tin Machine II "a return to raw form" and called it "the best music Bowie's released since 1980's Scary Monsters". A reviewer for NME gave the album a thumbs up, while a Billboard writer approved of Padgham's work on "One Shot". Pareles praised the album, particularly Gabrels' guitar work, which he described as "two parts Robert Fripp, one part Eddie Van Halen and one part speeding ambulance". In the late 1990s, some critics have suggested that the album was "unjustly" harshly reviewed at the time of its release. This was echoed by Tony Horkins of International Musician magazine, who initially hypothesised that "maybe, like the rest of Bowie's career, it'll all make a lot more sense in a few years time".

In 2010 and again in 2015, Uncut placed the album on their list of 50 Great Lost Albums (their list of great albums not currently available for purchase), calling it "extraordinary". In a retrospective review for AllMusic, Mark Allender considered Tin Machine II a "well-conceived and well-executed" album, lamenting that it had perhaps been released before radio listeners were ready to listen. He noted the improved production from their debut and highlighted "Amlapura", "Goodbye Mr. Ed", "Baby Universal" and "You Belong in Rock 'n' Roll" as standouts. Nevertheless, Ted Asregadoo of Ultimate Classic Rock found the album has "none of the anger, the immediacy, or the power of the debut album". In 2006, Q ranked Tin Machine II tenth in their list of the 50 worst albums ever.

== Legacy ==
Bowie's biographers have given Tin Machine II mixed reactions. Pegg calls the record overall "mediocre", stating that it contains both improvements on Tin Machine and moments that are "simply unspeakable". He states that the album features "more balanced and polished" production than their debut and greater instrumentation, calling Bowie's saxophone playing on the record some of his best in years. Pegg highlights the likes of "Baby Universal", "Shopping for Girls" and "Goodbye Mr. Ed" as great tracks but pans the Hunt-sung tracks as some of the "most frighteningly bad songs ever to find their way into the Bowie canon". Buckley agrees, finding the record to be a mixed bag of both good and bad tracks, praising "Shopping for Girls" and "Goodbye Mr. Ed" while panning "Stateside" and "Sorry". Paul Trynka also denounces the Hunt-sung tracks and similarly says that the album displays "the same virtues and drawbacks" as the debut, but "each of them magnified".

In 2020, the Bowie estate announced that the album would be reissued for the first time since its original release on 17 July via label Music on Vinyl, on both vinyl and CD. However, Gabrels immediately stated after the initial announcement that neither he nor Palmer knew anything about the re-release.

== Track listing ==
Tin Machine II track listing
No.	Title	Writer(s)	Length
1.	"Baby Universal"	David Bowie, Reeves Gabrels	3:18
2.	"One Shot"	Bowie, Gabrels, Hunt Sales, Tony Fox Sales	5:11
3.	"You Belong in Rock n' Roll"	Bowie, Gabrels	4:07
4.	"If There Is Something"	Bryan Ferry	4:45
5.	"Amlapura"	Bowie, Gabrels	3:46
6.	"Betty Wrong"	Bowie, Gabrels	3:48
7.	"You Can't Talk"	Bowie, Gabrels, H. Sales, T. Sales	3:09
8.	"Stateside"	Bowie, H. Sales	5:38
9.	"Shopping for Girls"	Bowie, Gabrels	3:44
10.	"A Big Hurt"	Bowie	3:40
11.	"Sorry"	H. Sales	3:29
12.	"Goodbye Mr. Ed"	Bowie, H. Sales, T. Sales	3:24
13.	"Hammerhead" (instrumental; hidden track)	Bowie, H. Sales	0:57

== Personnel ==
According to the liner notes and the biographer Nicholas Pegg.

Tin Machine

- David Bowie – lead (1–7, 9, 10, 12) and backing (8, 11) vocals, rhythm guitar, piano, saxophone
- Reeves Gabrels – guitar, backing vocals, organ, vibrator (3)
- Tony Fox Sales – bass, backing vocals
- Hunt Sales – drums, percussion, backing and lead (8, 11) vocals

Additional musicians

- Kevin Armstrong – rhythm guitar (4), piano (9)
- Tim Palmer – additional piano and percussion

Production

- Tin Machine – producers, mixing
- Tim Palmer – producer, mixing
- Hugh Padgham – production, engineering and mixing on "One Shot"
- Guy Gray, Simon Vinestock, Justin Shirley-Smith, Eric Schilling, Ruggie Simkins, Chuck Ferry – engineering
- Reiner Design Consultants, Inc. – design
- Edward Bell – illustration
- Sally Hershberger – photography

== Charts ==
Chart performance for Tin Machine II
Chart (1991)	Peak Position
Australian Albums (ARIA)	139
Austrian Albums (Ö3 Austria)	25
Canada Top Albums/CDs (RPM)	49
Dutch Albums (Album Top 100)	33
German Albums (Offizielle Top 100)	56
Norwegian Albums (VG-lista)	14
Swedish Albums (Sverigetopplistan)	19
UK Albums (OCC)	23
US Top Pop Albums (Billboard)	126
