= Big Towne, 2061 =

Studio album by Paris
- Released: August 1976
- Recorded: 1976 at the Total Experience Studios, Hollywood, California
- Genre: Rock
- Length: 40:05
- Label: Capitol
- Producer: Bob Hughes

Paris chronology
Paris (1976)	Big Towne, 2061 (1976)

Professional ratings
Review scores
Source	Rating
Allmusic	2/5 stars
Christgau's Record Guide	B

Big Towne, 2061 is the second and final studio album by the power trio group Paris, who disbanded not long after its release. The album reached number 152 on the Billboard pop album chart.

Drummer Thom Mooney left the band shortly after recording the eponymous first album, so drums on this album were played by Hunt Sales, who had previously been with Todd Rundgren's band Utopia.

Guitarist/vocalist Bob Welch had written most of the songs for a projected third Paris album, when Sales fell ill, and the group disbanded before recording started. Welch used these songs on his solo album French Kiss.

== Re-release ==
The album was re-released on CD, on the Zoom Club label, in 2001 and again in 2004. The CD re-release did not include any additional, re-mixed or other bonus tracks.

In 2013, Capitol Records/USM Japan/Universal Music remastered and reissued a paper-sleeve album replica (Mini LP) SHM-CD version of Big Towne, 2061 (TYCP-80037).

== Track listing ==
All tracks are written by Bob Welch except where noted

Side one
No.	Title	Length
1.	"Blue Robin"	2:26
2.	"Big Towne, 2061"	4:30
3.	"Pale Horse, Pale Rider"	3:22
4.	"New Orleans"	4:14
5.	"Outlaw Game" (Welch, Hunt Sales)	5:16

Side two
No.	Title	Length
6.	"Money Love" (Welch, Sales)	3:52
7.	"Heart of Stone"	2:40
8.	"Slave Trader"	3:07
9.	"1 in 10"	2:59
10.	"Janie" (Welch, Glenn Cornick)	7:27

== Personnel ==
Paris

- Bob Welch – vocals, guitar
- Glenn Cornick – bass guitar, keyboards
- Hunt Sales – vocals, drums, percussion

Additional personnel

- Bob Hughes – production, engineering
- Steve Pouliot and Meyrick Smith – assistant engineering
