= Is It Any Wonder? (EP) =

2020 EP by David Bowie

EP by David Bowie
- Released: 14 February 2020 (streaming); 20 March 2020 (physical)
- Recorded: 1995–98
- Studio: Looking Glass, Sony Music (New York City)
- Genre: Art rock; industrial rock; drum and bass; electronica
- Length: 28:15
- Label: Parlophone
- Producer: David Bowie, Reeves Gabrels & Mark Plati

David Bowie chronology
Conversation Piece (2019)	Is It Any Wonder? (2020)	ChangesNowBowie (2020)

Is it Any Wonder? is a six-track extended play by David Bowie that was released in early 2020. It is composed of older Bowie and Tin Machine songs that the artist mostly re-recorded during his Earthling (1997) sessions and Earthling Tour rehearsals in early 1997, plus a few new tracks originated in the same era of this recording.

== Background ==
Many of the tracks on the EP had not been released before. "Baby Universal '97", originally by Tin Machine, was re-recorded for Earthling in 1996 (to be slotted between "I'm Afraid of Americans" and "Law (Earthlings On Fire)", but was dropped from the album before its release.

"Fun" came from the song "Fame", re-worked on Bowie's 1997 Earthling Tour as "Is it Any Wonder?". The song started with basic backing and sequencer tracks recorded during pre-tour rehearsals in early 1997, supplemented with a version of "Is It Any Wonder?" recorded in June 1997, and then mixed by Mark Plati and Reeves Gabrels at Looking Glass Studios in New York and at Sony Music Studios in New York in February 1998. The track was mixed by Danny Saber in May of that same year, and by then, it was a completely new piece of work (written by Bowie and Gabrels), featuring no elements of "Fame". This Clownboy mix variant has previously only appeared on Virgin Records in-house CDR’s, and it was released on this EP in a 2020 remaster.

"Stay '97", an updated version of "Stay" released originally in 1976 on his album Station to Station, was recorded in 1997 at The Factory studios in Dublin and mixed in mid-1997, potentially for use as a B-side.

The Tin Machine track, "I Can't Read", was re-recorded as a solo David Bowie recording in 1996 (being called "I Can't Read '97" in this EP). This one was Bowie’s preferred solo version, but it was ultimately cut from Earthling by him to be replaced at the last minute with "The Last Thing You Should Do". An alternative version of that discarded rerecording, differentiated by featuring minor chords and a darker sound for the chorus, was worked for The Ice Storm film, thus, a full-length version that included this further (alternative) reworking appeared on a single in 1997, while an edit featured on the film’s soundtrack album.

"Baby Universal '97", "Stay '97" and "I Can't Read '97" (in that particular early Earthling version) had not been released before.

"Nuts" is a semi instrumental track (written by Bowie, Gabrels and Plati), that was recorded in November 1996 and was intended as a bonus track, but it was never released until this EP.

This mix of "The Man Who Sold the World" was originally released in 1995 as the b-side to Bowie's "Strangers When We Meet" single, but had not been released since, and in this EP featured in a 2020 remaster. The mix was made on 30 October 1995 by Brian Eno, from a live recording version played during the Outside World Tour that was a trip hop reworking of the song, to which according Eno's diaries, "added some backing vocals and a sonar blip, and sculpted the piece a little so that there was more contour to it."

== Release ==
In the build-up to the EP's release, tracks were available to stream, one per week, starting in January 2020. The entire EP was available via streaming services starting on 14 February 2020, while the physical formats were made available in a limited edition (of 4000 copies on CD and 6000 copies on 12-inch vinyl) to purchase in 20 March 2020, exclusively at davidbowie.com and rhino.com.

The physical EP featured “Fun (Clownboy Mix)” in place of “The Man Who Sold The World (ChangesNowBowie Version)" from the streaming EP, leaving that version exclusive (on physical formats) to the ChangesNowBowie album that would be released on Record Store Day 29 August 2020.

== Track listing ==
1. "Baby Universal '97" – 3:14
2. "Fun (Clownboy mix)" – 3:12
3. "Stay '97" – 7:32
4. "I Can't Read '97" – 5:27
5. "Nuts" – 5:22
6. "The Man Who Sold the World (Live Eno Mix)" – 3:35

== Personnel ==
Adapted from the Is It Any Wonder? liner notes.

"Baby Universal '97" (Lyrics: Bowie. Music: Bowie, Gabrels)

- David Bowie – vocals; producer
- Zachary Alford – drums
- Gail Ann Dorsey – bass guitar; vocals
- Mike Garson – keyboards; piano
- Reeves Gabrels – synthesizers; guitars; co-producer
- Mark Plati – programming; keyboards; co-producer

"Fun (Clownboy Mix)" (Bowie, Gabrels)

- David Bowie – vocals; producer
- Zachary Alford – drums
- Gail Ann Dorsey – bass guitar; vocals
- Mike Garson – piano
- Reeves Gabrels – guitars; producer
- Mark Plati – keyboards and programming; recording; producer
- Steve Guest – recording
- Danny Saber – mixing
- John X – mix engineering

"Stay '97" (Bowie)

- David Bowie – vocals; producer
- Zachary Alford – drums
- Gail Ann Dorsey – bass guitar; vocals
- Mike Garson – piano and keyboards
- Reeves Gabrels – guitars; synthesizers; co-producer
- Mark Plati – programming and keyboards; mixing; co-producer

"I Can't Read '97" (Bowie, Gabrels)

- David Bowie – vocals; producer
- Gail Ann Dorsey – bass guitar; vocals
- Mike Garson – piano
- Reeves Gabrels – guitars; co-producer
- Mark Plati – mixing; co-producer

"Nuts" (Bowie, Gabrels, Plati)

- David Bowie – vocals; producer
- Reeves Gabrels – guitars; co-producer
- Mark Plati – keyboards and programming; recording and mixing; co-producer

"The Man Who Sold the World (Live Eno Mix)" (Bowie)

- David Bowie – vocals; producer
- Reeves Gabrels – guitars
- Peter Schwartz – synthesizers
- Carlos Alomar – guitars
- Gail Ann Dorsey – bass guitar
- Zachary Alford – drums
- Brian Eno – backing vocals; mixing

Production For Release

- Ray Staff – mastering
- Scott Minshall – designer
- Floria Sigismondi (The David Bowie Archive) – photographer
- Aisha Cohen – producer for RZO Music
- Nigel Reeve – producer for Warner Music

== Charts ==
Chart (2020)	Peak position
Scottish Albums (OCC)	3
UK Albums (OCC)	10
