= Paris (Paris album) =

Studio album by Paris
- Released: January 1976
- Recorded: 1975
- Genre: Rock
- Length: 40:06
- Label: Capitol
- Producer: Jimmy Robinson

Paris chronology
Paris (1976)	Big Towne, 2061 (1976)

Professional ratings
Review scores
Source	Rating
AllMusic	2/5 stars

Paris is the debut album by American rock band Paris. It was the only album recorded by the original Paris lineup, as drummer Thom Mooney left shortly afterwards.

The songs on Paris were all written by guitarist/vocalist Bob Welch and are in a vein similar to Led Zeppelin. The album reached number 103 on the Billboard pop album chart.

In 2013, Capitol Records/USM Japan/Universal Music remastered and reissued a paper-sleeve album replica (Mini LP) SHM-CD version of Paris.

== Re-release ==
The album was re-released on CD, on the Zoom Club label, in 2000 and again in 2004. The CD re-release did not include any additional, re-mixed or other bonus tracks. The album was reissued on CD by Rock Candy Records in 2012

== Cover art ==
The logo of the band was Cornick's creation.

== Track listing ==
All tracks are written by Bob Welch

Side one
No.	Title	Length
1.	"Black Book"	3:10
2.	"Religion"	5:18
3.	"Starcage"	3:55
4.	"Beautiful Youth"	3:55
5.	"Nazarene"	3:56

Side two
No.	Title	Length
6.	"Narrow Gate (La Porte Etroite)"	6:42
7.	"Solitaire"	4:04
8.	"Breathless"	3:20
9.	"Rock of Ages"	3:11
10.	"Red Rain"	3:21

== Personnel ==
Paris

- Bob Welch – vocals, guitar
- Glenn Cornick – bass, keyboards
- Thom Mooney – drums

Additional personnel

- Jimmy Robinson – production, engineering
- Roy Kohara – art direction
