= Paris (band) =

American rock band (1975–1977)

- Origin: United States
- Genres: Blues rock, hard rock, funk, heavy metal, psychedelic rock, jazz fusion
- Years active: 1975–1977
- Label: Capitol
- Past members: Bob Welch; Glenn Cornick; Thom Mooney; Hunt Sales; Tony Fox Sales

Paris was an American rock music power trio supergroup formed in 1975 by guitarist and vocalist Bob Welch, who had just left Fleetwood Mac, bass player Glenn Cornick, formerly of Jethro Tull, and drummer Thom Mooney who had been a member of Nazz with Todd Rundgren.

== History ==
The group released two albums for Capitol Records, Paris and Big Towne, 2061, both in 1976. Paris toured in support of these albums, playing at arenas and auditoriums with Blue Öyster Cult, Rush, Cheap Trick, Trapeze, Leslie West, Rainbow, Bachman–Turner Overdrive, Thin Lizzy, Head East, Be-Bop Deluxe, Heart, The Outlaws, Nektar and Wishbone Ash. After the first album, Mooney was replaced by Hunt Sales, who had also played with Rundgren.

Initially the band's sound was rock-oriented, but later developed towards funk, and represented a departure from Welch's work with Fleetwood Mac. Cornick then departed the band and was replaced by Sales' brother Tony Fox Sales. A third album was planned, but Hunt Sales fell ill and after they did not achieve commercial success, the group split in 1977.

Songs from the aborted third Paris album were used for Welch's first solo album, French Kiss, and the deal with Capitol was converted into a solo album deal for Welch.

After Paris split up, Welch launched a successful solo career, and Sales worked with Iggy Pop and later Tin Machine with David Bowie. British-born Cornick moved to the US where, after a decade out of the music business, he reformed his band Wild Turkey in the 1990s.

In 2013, Capitol Records/USM Japan/Universal Music remastered and reissued paper-sleeve album replica (Mini LP) SHM-CD versions of Paris (TYCP-80036) and Big Towne, 2061 (TYCP-80037).

== Discography ==
- Paris (1976)
- Big Towne, 2061 (1976)
