= Hunt Sales =

American rock drummer (born 1954)

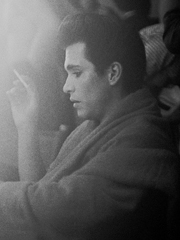
- Hunt Sales in 1981

Background information
- Born: March 2, 1954 (age 72)
- Instrument: Drums
- Formerly of: Paris; Utopia; Tin Machine; Iggy Pop

Hunt Sales (born March 2, 1954) is an American rock drummer, who has played with Todd Rundgren, Iggy Pop and Tin Machine with David Bowie. He has often worked with his brother Tony Sales, a bass guitarist.

== Personal life ==
Hunt Sales is a son of the television comedian Soupy Sales. He has two daughters: Cali Sales, born in 1990, and Sugar Sales, born in 2007.

== Career ==
Hunt Sales' first group was with brother Tony in Tony and the Tigers. They appeared on Hullabaloo in 1966, and also on the local Detroit/Windsor dance show Swingin' Time with Robin Seymour.

in 1970 he joined his brother Tony along with Todd Rundgren on recordings for his Runt and Runt: The Ballad of Todd Rundgren albums. In 1973 Hunt and Tony joined Rundgren again to form "Utopia" Mark I. The tour lasted two weeks and was cancelled due to technological issues.

In 1976, he played drums with the hard rock power trio Paris, formed by Bob Welch, a guitarist songwriter formerly of Fleetwood Mac. This trio (which included ex-Jethro Tull bassist Glenn Cornick) was short-lived, releasing two albums for Capitol Records. Hunt played and sang backing vocals on the second Paris album, Big Towne, 2061.

In 1977, along with his brother Tony, Hunt played on the Iggy Pop album Lust for Life. David Bowie's memories of the Sales brothers' contribution to the recording led him to invite the pair to join Tin Machine in the late 1980s.

He performed on several movie soundtracks:

- 1992 Dr. Giggles (writer: "Stateside")
- 1989 Slaves of New York ("Fall in Love with Me")
- 1988 Tapeheads (writer: "Now That You're Gone")
- 1987 American Ninja 2: The Confrontation (producer: "Tell About Mary")

He also performed in the following movie and TV series:

- 1991 The Linguini Incident (with David Bowie and Iman), drummer
- 1990 Tales from the Crypt (TV series) – For Cryin' Out Loud, drummer
- 1966 I've Got a Secret (TV series) as himself

In the 2000s, Sales relocated to Austin, Texas, where he produces and does session work. He was a member of a band led by Charlie Sexton, which participated as part of the Los Super Seven musical collective on Heard It on the X (2005).

Hunt Sales released a solo album in 2019.

== Discography ==
=== With Todd Rundgren ===
- Runt (1970)
- Runt: The Ballad of Todd Rundgren (1971)
- Something/Anything? (1972)

=== With Paris ===
- Big Towne, 2061 (1976)

=== With Iggy Pop ===
- Kill City (recorded 1975, released 1977)[played on 2 tracks]
- Lust For Life (1977)
- TV Eye Live 1977 (1978)

=== With Tender Fury ===
- Garden of Evil (1990)

=== With Tin Machine ===
- Tin Machine (1989)
- Tin Machine II (1991)
- Tin Machine Live: Oy Vey, Baby (1992)

=== Other ===
- Heard It on the X, as part of Los Super Seven (Telarc, 2005)

=== Solo ===
- Get Your Shit Together, as Hunt Sales Memorial (2019)
